= Agency for French Education Abroad =

French government agency

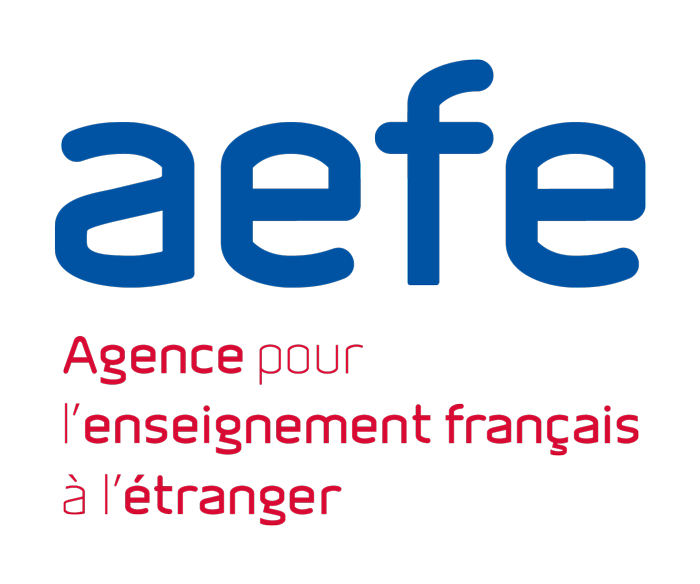

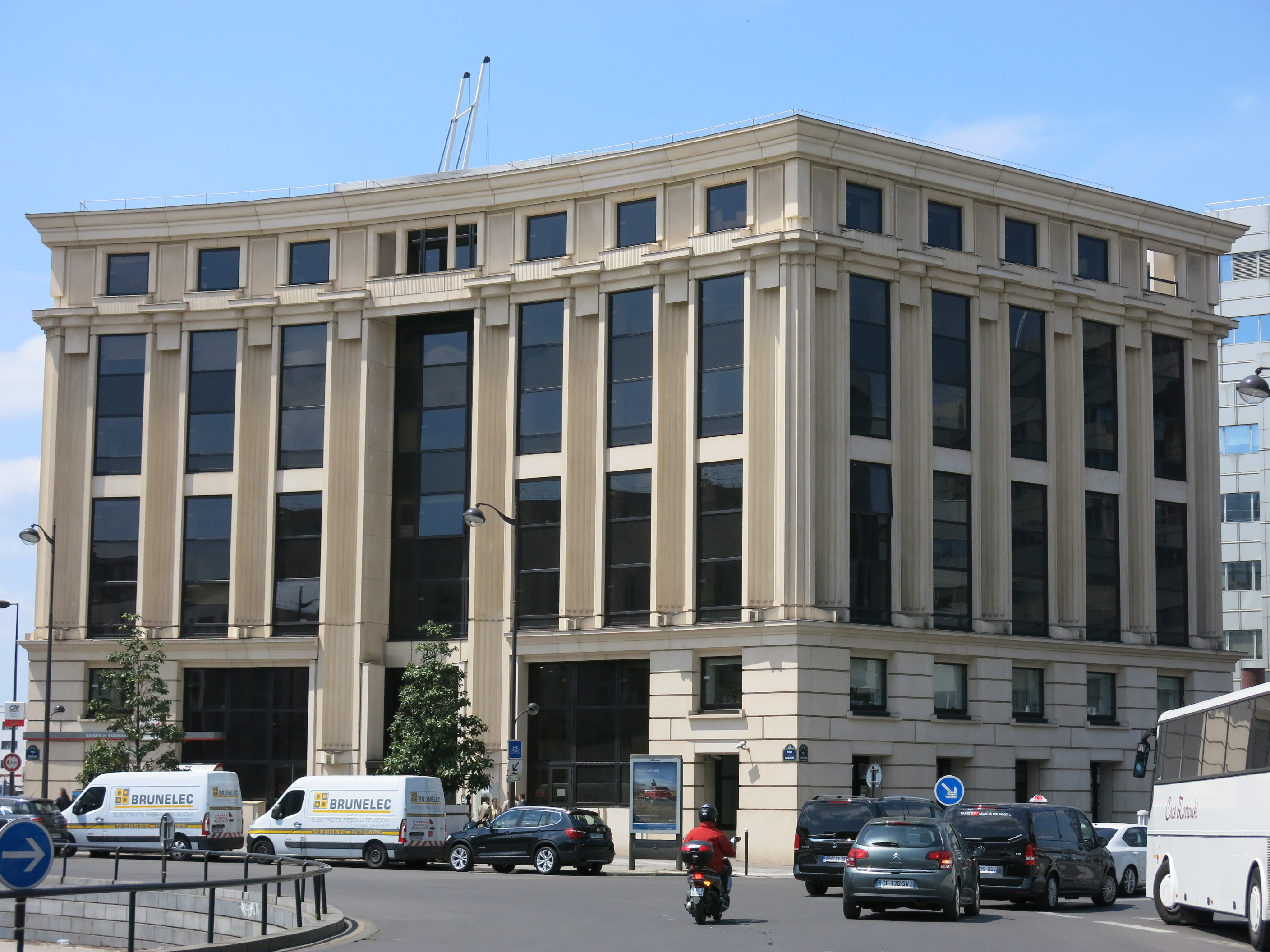
Former AEFE head office in Paris

The Agency for French Education Abroad, also known as the Agency for French Teaching Abroad (French: Agence pour l'enseignement français à l'étranger; AEFE), is a national public agency under the administration of the Ministry of Foreign Affairs of France that ensures the quality of schools teaching the French national curriculum outside France. The AEFE has 495 schools in its worldwide network, with French as the primary language of instruction in most schools.

The AEFE head office is in Saint-Ouen-sur-Seine. It was previously headquartered in the 14th arrondissement of Paris.

== Curriculum ==
Schools are either directly managed (gestion directe), contracted (conventionné) or accredited (homologué). The schools provide an education based on the French national curriculum for pupils of various cultures from preschool through secondary school, and some receive substantial financial support from the French government. The schools provide an education leading to a baccalauréat, and students have access to all other French schools at their own educational level.

In addition, the schools have a curriculum linked to the individual countries in which they are established. The Lycée Français de San Francisco and the Silicon Valley International School in San Francisco, for example, include American History and English Literature in its program, and the Lycée Français de Caracas includes History of Venezuela (ICV) from 6th to 9th grade.

Schools are located throughout Europe, the Americas, Asia and Africa. Most of their pupils are children of French expatriates but they also include many regular pupils attracted by the quality of schooling provided. In any given academic year, around 160,000 students study in these schools.

== School names ==
While there are no public guidelines for naming schools in the AEFE network, they tend to have some similarities. A school that follows the French curriculum through secondary school (high school in the United States and sixth form college in Great Britain) is often named a Lycée Français and prepares students for the French baccalauréat. Schools that combine the local and French curricula are often called French-American or French-Mexican schools for example. Schools that offer the International Baccalaureate are often called International School or Lycée International.

== Schools operated by or receiving funding from AEFE ==
Colombo, Sri Lanka, Ecole Française Internationale de Colombo

- Abu Dhabi, Lycée Louis-Massignon
- Abu Dhabi, Lycée Français Théodore-Monod
- Accra, Lycée Français International Jacques Prévert d’Accra
- Alicante, Lycée Français d'Alicante Pierre Deschamps
- Alexandria, Lycée Français d'Alexandrie
- Amman, Lycée Français International d'Amman
- Amsterdam, Lycée Vincent van Gogh La Haye-Amsterdam
- Andorra la Vella, Lycée Comte de Foix
- Ankara, Lycée Français Charles de Gaulle, Ankara
- Antananarivo, Lycée Français de Tananarive
- Antananarivo, Lycée La Clairefontaine
- Asunción, Lycée Français International Marcel Pagnol
- Athens, Lycée Franco-Hellénique Eugène Delacroix
- Austin, Austin International School
- Bali, Lycée Français de Bali
- Bamako, Lycée Français Liberté de Bamako
- Bamako, Groupe Scolaire Les Angelots
- Bangkok, Lycée Français International de Bangkok
- Barcelona, Lycée Français de Barcelone
- Beijing, Lycée Français International Charles de Gaulle de Pekin
- Beirut, Grand Lycée Franco-Libanais
- Beirut, Lycée Franco-Libanais Verdun
- Beirut, Lycée Abdel Kader
- Berlin, Lycée français de Berlin
- Berlin, Collège Voltaire
- Berkeley, California École Bilingue de Berkeley
- Bethesda, Rochambeau French International School
- Bilbao, Lycée Français de Bilbao
- Bobo Dioulasso, École Française André Malraux
- Bogotá, Lycée Français Louis Pasteur
- Bonn, École Charles de Gaulle-Adenauer
- Boston, International School of Boston
- Brussels, Lycée Français Jean Monnet de Bruxelles
- Bucharest, Lycée Français Anna de Noailles Bucarest
- Budapest, Gustave Eiffel French School of Budapest
- Buenos Aires, Lycée Franco-Argentin Jean Mermoz
- Cairo, Lycée Français du Caire
- Calgary, Lycée Louis Pasteur
- Cali, Lycée Français Paul Valéry de Cali
- California, Silicon Valley International School
- Cape Town, Cape Town French School
- Caracas, Lycée Français de Caracas
- Casablanca, Lycée Lyautey
- Chicago, Lycée Français de Chicago
- Concepción, Lycée Français Charles de Gaulle
- Conakry, Lycée français Albert Camus
- Copenhagen, Lycée Français Prins Henrik
- Curicó, Lycée français Jean Mermoz
- Dakar, Lycée Jean Mermoz
- Dallas, Dallas International School
- Damascus, Lycée Français Charles de Gaulle
- Dhaka, École Française Internationale de Dacca
- Delhi, Lycée Français de Delhi
- Doha, Lycée Bonaparte Français de Doha
- Doha, Lycée Franco-Qatarien Voltaire
- Douala, Lycée Français Dominique Savio
- Dubai, Lycée Français International Georges-Pompidou
- Dubai, Lycée Français International de Dubaï
- Dublin, Lycée Français International Samuel Beckett
- Düsseldorf, Lycée français de Düsseldorf
- Frankfurt, Lycée français Victor Hugo
- Greenville, The International School of Greenville SC
- Guadalajara, Lycée Français de Guadalajara
- Guatemala City, Lycée Français Jules Verne
- Habboûch, Lycée Franco-Libanais Habbouche-Nabatieh
- Hamburg, Lycée Franco-Allemand Hambourg
- Hanoi, Lycée français Alexandre Yersin
- Heidelberg, Ecole Pierre et Marie Curie Heidelberg
- Hong Kong, French International School of Hong Kong
- Houston, Awty International School
- Houston, Lycée International de Houston
- Islamabad, École Française d'Islamabad
- Istanbul, Lycée français Pierre Loti d'Instanbul
- Jakarta, French School Jakarta
- Jerusalem, Lycée Français de Jérusalem
- Johannesburg, Lycée français Jules Verne
- Kiev, Lycée français Anne de Kiev
- Košice, Lycée bilingue M.R. Štefánik
- Kuala Lumpur, French School of Kuala Lumpur
- Kuwait City, Lycée Français de Koweït
- Kabul, Lycée Malalai
- Kabul, Lycée Esteqlal
- Lagos, Lycée Français Louis Pasteur de Lagos
- La Paz, Lycée Franco-Bolivien Alcides D'Orbigny
- Lima, Lycée Franco-Péruvien
- Lisbon, Lycée français Charles Lepierre
- London, Lycée Français Charles de Gaulle
- London, Lycée International de Londres Winston Churchill
- Los Angeles, International School of Los Angeles (LILA)
- Los Angeles, Lycée Français de Los Angeles
- Luxembourg City, Lycée français Vauban
- Madrid, Lycée Français de Madrid
- Málaga, Lycée Français de Málaga
- Managua, Lycée Franco-Nicaraguayen Victor Hugo
- Manama, École Française de Bahreïn
- Manila, French School of Manila
- Mauritius, Lycée La Bourdonnais
- Mauritius, Lycée des Mascareignes
- Meknes, Lycée Paul Valéry
- Mexico City, Lycée Franco-Mexicain
- Milan, Lycée Stendhal de Milan
- Montevideo, Liceo Francés Jules Supervielle de Montevideo
- Montreal, Collège international Marie de France
- Montreal, Collège Stanislas Montréal
- Mumbai, Lycée Français International de Mumbai
- Munich, Lycée Jean Renoir de Munich
- Murcia, Lycée Français André Malraux de Murcie
- Muscat, École Française de Mascate
- Nairobi, Lycée Denis Diderot
- Naples, École Alexandre-Dumas de Naples
- New Orleans, Lycée Français de la Nouvelle-Orléans
- New Jersey, The French American Academy
- New York, French-American School of New York (located in suburban Westchester County)
- New York City, The École
- Nicosia, École Franco-Chypriote de Nicosie
- Oslo, Lycée français René Cassin d'Oslo
- Osorno, Lycée français Claude Gay
- Ottawa, Lycée Paul Claudel d'Ottawa
- Ouagadougou, Lycée français Saint-Exupéry
- Philadelphia, French International School of Philadelphia
- Phnom Penh, Lycée français René Descartes de Phnom Penh
- Pondicherry, Lycée français de Pondichéry
- Port-au-Prince, Lycée Alexandre Dumas
- Porto, École Française Marius Latour
- Port Vila, Lycée Français Jean-Marie Gustave Le Clézio
- Pretoria, École Miriam Makeba Annexe du lycée français Jules Verne de Johannesburg
- Princeton, French American School of Princeton
- Providence, French-American School of Rhode Island
- Quebec City, Collège Stanislas Annexe de Québec
- Rabat, Lycée Descartes
- Rio de Janeiro, Lycée Molière de Rio De Janeiro
- Rome, Institut Saint Dominique
- Rome, Lycée français Chateaubriand
- San Diego, San Diego French-American School
- San Francisco, The International School of San Francisco
- San Francisco, Lycée Français La Pérouse de San Francisco
- San José, Lycée Franco-Costaricien
- Santa Cruz de la Sierra, Collège Français de Santa Cruz de la Sierra
- Santo Domingo, Lycée Français de Saint Domingue
- Seoul, French School of Seoul
- Shanghai, Lycée Français de Shanghai
- Sharjah, Lycée Francais International Georges Pompidou
- Singapore, International French School of Singapore
- Sofia, Lycée Français Victor Hugo
- Stockholm, Lycée Français de Stockholm
- Sydney, Lycée Condorcet
- Taipei, Taipei European School
- Tangier, Lycée Regnault
- Tegucigalpa, Lycée Franco-Hondurien
- The Hague, Lycée Vincent van Gogh La Haye-Amsterdam
- Thessaloniki, French School of Thessaloniki
- Toamasina, Lycée Français de Tamatave
- Tokyo, Lycée Français International de Tokyo
- Toronto, Lycée Français Toronto
- Toronto, Toronto French School
- Tunis, Lycée Pierre Mendès France
- Tunis (La Marsa), Lycée Gustave Flaubert
- Turin, Lycée Français Jean Giono
- Valencia, Lycée Français de Valence
- Vancouver, Cousteau École Française Internationale de Vancouver
- Vienna, Lycée Français de Vienne
- Vilnius, Vilnius International French Lyceum
- Viña del Mar, Lycée français Jean d'Alembert
- Vitacura, Lycée Antoine de Saint-Exupéry de Santiago
- Warsaw, René Goscinny French High School
- Yaoundé, Lycée Français Fustel de Coulanges
- Zurich, Lycée francais Marie Curie de Zurich

== See also ==
- Education in France
- Central Agency for German Schools Abroad (ZfA) - The German equivalent of the AEFE
