= Lycée Charles de Gaulle =

Lycée Charles de Gaulle may refer to:

In France:

- Lycée international Charles-de-Gaulle, Dijon
- Lycée Charles de Gaulle (Paris)
- Lycée Charles de Gaulle (Poissy) (Paris area)
- Lycée Charles de Gaulle (Rosny-sous-Bois) (Paris area)

Schools outside France:

- Lycée Français Charles de Gaulle in London
- Lycée Français Charles de Gaulle, Ankara, Turkey
- Lycée Français Charles de Gaulle (Central African Republic), Bangui, Central African Republic
- Lycée Français Charles de Gaulle (Chile), Concepción, Chile
- Lycée Charles de Gaulle (Syria), Damascus, Syria
- Lycée Français International Charles de Gaulle de Pékin, Beijing, China
