= Groupe Scolaire Jean Charcot =

French international school in El Jadida, Morocco

Groupe Scolaire Jean Charcot is a French international school in El Jadida, Morocco. Affiliated with the OSUI of the Mission laïque française (MLF), it serves petite section through terminale, the final year of lycée (sixth form college/senior high school).

It opened in 1962. The school was to be closed in June 1997, when the AEFE stopped operating the school due to its small size; at the time it had 70 students in maternelle and ecole primaire. The French Embassy recruited MLF to take over operations, and the school remained open. It had about 250 students in September 1998, when its secondary division opened. The student enrollment increased to 340 and then 617 in September 2000 and September 2015, respectively.
