= LFH =

LFH may refer to:

- LFH Division 1 Féminine, the premier women's handball league in France
- Luftverkehr Friesland-Harle, an airline based in Harle, Germany
- Low-force helix, a 60-pin electrical connector
- Linux Filesystem Hierarchy, the directory structure of Linux operating systems
- Lycée Franco-Hellénique Eugène Delacroix, a French international school in the Athens, Greece metropolitan area
- Lycée Franco-Hondurien, a French international school in Tegucigalpa, Honduras
