= École de Gaulle-Adenauer =

Coordinates: 50.6587°N 7.1890°E

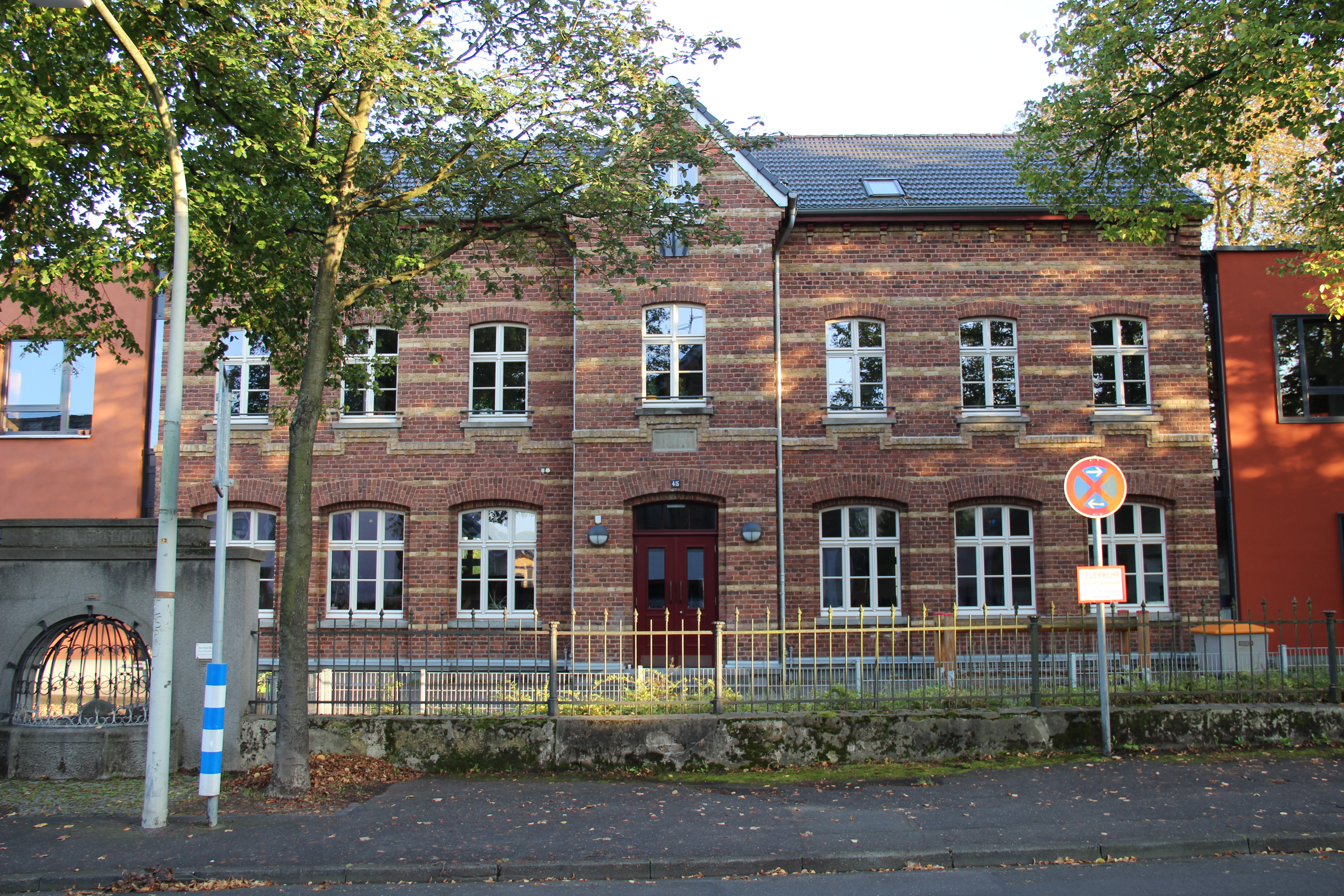
- School building
- Mehlem, Bonn; Germany

Information
- Type: French international school
- Established: 1950
- Principal: Hildegard Heinzle
- Enrollment: 176
- Website: ecole-bonn.de

École de Gaulle-Adenauer (German: Schule de Gaulle-Adenauer) or École française de Gaulle-Adenauer (EFDGA), formerly the Lycée Français de Gaulle-Adenauer, is a French international school in Mehlem, Bonn, Germany. As of 2015 it has 176 students, including 75 école maternelle (preschool) students and 101 primary students.

== History ==
It was established in 1950, with collège lower secondary classes beginning in 1961 and Baccalauréat classes established as of 1984. The AEFE began contracting with the school in 1990. That year the school received the name "Lycée de Gaulle-Adenauer," after Charles de Gaulle and Konrad Adenauer.

Secondary classes were terminated after the French embassy moved from its Bonn facility to Berlin in 1999.

In 2008 the school moved to a temporary site at Domhofstraße during a renovation and expansion of its buildings. It moved back to its current location on Meckenheimer Straße in 2010.

== See also ==
- La Gazette de Berlin

German international schools in France:

- Internationale Deutsche Schule Paris
- DFG / LFA Buc
- Deutsche Schule Toulouse

== Alumni ==
- Édouard Philippe, former Prime Minister of France
- Fynn Shenten, German footballer
