= LVH (disambiguation) =

Left ventricular hypertrophy is a thickening of the heart muscle of the left ventricle of the heart.

LVH may also refer to:

- LVH – Las Vegas Hotel & Casino, now known as Westgate Las Vegas
- Lycée Victor Hugo (disambiguation), the French schools
- Les Vraies Housewives, a French reality television show

== See also ==
- Lillian V. Haldeman, an American microbiologist
