= Groupe Scolaire Le Détroit =

International school in Tangier, Morocco

Groupe Scolaire Le Détroit is a French international school in Tangier, Morocco. A part of the Mission laïque française (MLF), it serves petite section through terminale (final year of lycée or senior high school/sixth form college).
