= EFIC =

EFIC may refer to:

- European Federation of IASP Chapters
- Export Finance and Insurance Corporation
- École Française Internationale de Canton (Guangzhou, China)
- École Française Internationale de Colombo
