= Lycée Victor Hugo =

Lycée Victor Hugo may refer to:

- Lycée Victor Hugo, Paris in Paris, France
- Lycée international Victor-Hugo (Colomiers) in Colomiers, France
- Lycée français Victor-Hugo de Port-Gentil in Port-Gentil, Gabon
- Lycée Français Victor Hugo in Frankfurt, Germany
- Lycée Victor Hugo (Italy) in Florence, Italy
- Lycée Victor-Hugo de Marrakech in Marrakech, Morocco
- Lycée Franco-Nicaraguayen Victor Hugo in Managua, Nicaragua
