= Austin International School =

Coordinates: 30.422°N 97.718°W

Location
- 4001 Adelphi Lane; Austin, Texas; United States

Information
- Type: Independent, Private, International School
- Motto: Expanding Minds. Broadening Perspectives.
- Established: 2001
- Head of School: Ms. Ariane Baer-Harper
- Faculty: 60
- Enrollment: 350
- Campus: Urban
- Colors: Green and Blue
- Mascot: Owls
- Yearbook: Les Amis
- Affiliation: Agency for French Education Abroad, Mission Laïque Française, Independent Schools Association of the Southwest, National Association of Independent Schools, International Baccalaureate Organization
- Nationalities: 60+
- Home languages: 20+
- Languages taught: French, English, Spanish
- Website: www.austininternationalschool.org

Austin International School (AIS) is a 501(c)(3) non-profit private school located in northern Austin, Texas, United States, for students in pre-kindergarten (petite section) through 8th grade (4e). AIS's primary school program follows a curriculum model of trilingual education, with students studying all subjects in French, English, and Spanish. Its secondary school program follows two tracks, preparing students to pursue the IB Diploma, the French Baccalaureate diploma, and/or an accredited American high school diploma once they reach high school.

== History ==
In the late 1990s there were plans to open this school, with an initial proposed starting date of September 1999.

Austin International School, originally called the "Lycée Français d'Austin" (French School of Austin), was founded in April 2001, by the Consul General of France to Houston, the Honorary Consul of France in Austin, some Austin-based business leaders, and a group of French, American, and Francophone parents to meet the demands of a growing international and globally-minded population in Austin. It opened with a summer camp before its first school term in 2001. It opened as a school teaching in French, English, and Spanish. Jeanne Jeannin was the first head of the school.

AIS became the third French-American school established in Texas and the 33rd in the United States. In its first year, AIS enrolled 65 pre-kindergarten, kindergarten and elementary students, with a student body that included French, American, and other nationalities. In 2006, it received its first American accreditation and in 2007, it became the first and only school in central Texas to be accredited by the French Ministry of Education. In 2019, received additional regional accreditation, becoming one of three schools in the State of Texas to hold full accreditation from both a regional accrediting body and the French Ministry of Education.

In summer 2011, AIS moved to its North Austin location, and with increased enrollment, opened its Middle School in 2017.

In 2019, AIS achieved accreditation through the Independent Schools Association of the Southwest, and was awarded a Platinum Seal of Transparency by GuideStar.

In 2025, AIS became in IB World School (MYP), and underwent phase 1 of campus planning, including increasing classes and a newly renovated library and auditorium. In 2026, AIS launched its new preschool campus adjacent to the original building.

== Curriculum ==
The school offers a trilingual education, and teaches the academic core content through the three languages. In 2003, the school divided the instruction by language as follows: about 60% of the lessons being conducted in French, following the French curriculum standards, 25% of them being conducted in English (Common Core Standards), and the rest being conducted in Spanish (CEFR - Common European Framework). The school offers additional support classes for those entering without any former exposure to French, Spanish, or English.

== Affiliations and accreditation ==
Austin International School's is the only school in central Texas to be fully accredited by the Agency for French Education Abroad (the overseas arm of the Ministry of National Education of France) and it is a partner organization of the Mission Laïque Française (MLF). Regionally, the school is fully accredited by the Independent Schools Association of the Southwest (ISAS). and most recently obtained its International Baccalauraeate MYP authorization.

Through its accreditation, Austin International School is a member of the National Association of Independent Schools (NAIS), the Texas Private Schools Association (TPSA), and is fully recognized by the Texas Private School Accreditation Commission (TEPSAC).
