= French School of Thessaloniki =

- École Française de Thessalonique; Γαλλικό Σχολείο Θεσσαλονίκης

Location
- Leoforos Stratou 2A; 54640 Thessaloniki; Greece
- Coordinates: 40.621161°N 22.957009°E

Information
- Type: French International school
- Motto: Two cultures, three languages
- Established: 1906
- Principal: Alain Hardy
- Grades: From Preschool to 12th Grade; Teaching includes some distance learning (from 6th to 12th Grades)
- Enrollment: 125 (2017-2018)
- Language: French, Modern Greek, English
- Affiliation: Mission laïque française (since 1906)
- Information: Mlf School
- Exam Preparation: French national diploma, Baccalauréat
- Languages taught: French, Modern Greek, English, German, Italian, Spanish, Latin, Ancient Greek
- Language Certifications: French (DELF, DALF)
- Website: efth.gr

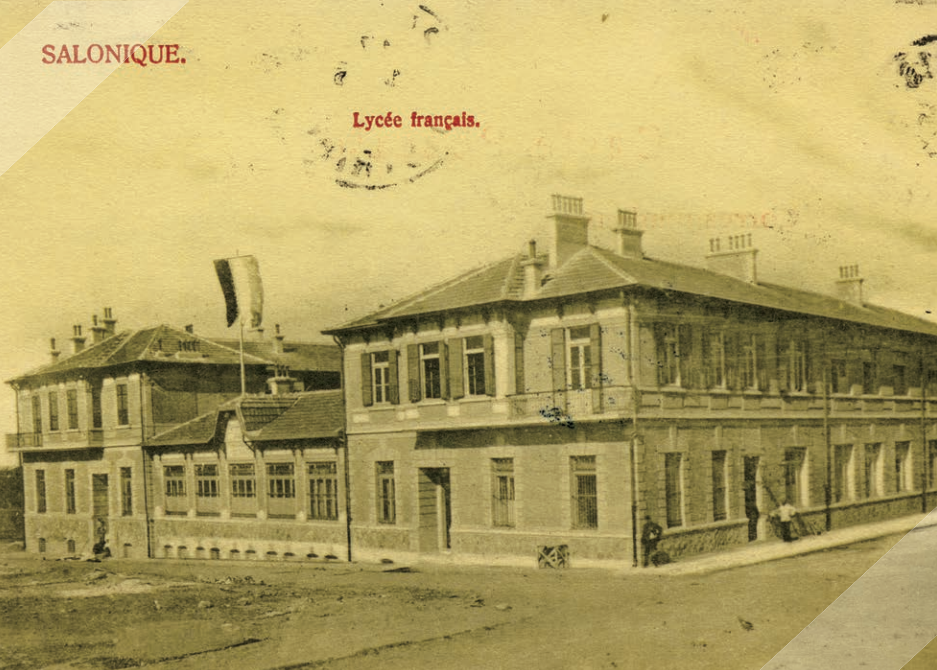
The French school in 1912, known here as the "Lycée français de Salonique"

The French School of Thessaloniki (FST, French: École Française de Thessalonique EFTH, Greek: Γαλλικό Σχολείο Θεσσαλονίκης) is a French international school in Thessaloniki, Greece. It was established in 1906 and has integrated the Mission laïque française (Mlf) in 1906. It serves levels maternelle (preschool) through terminale, the final year of lycée (senior high school). It serves levels maternelle (preschool) through troisième, the final year of collège (junior high school). and it allows French, English and Modern Greek languages learning from preschool for all children. As of 2017 the school has about 125 students range from 2 to 18 years.

== History ==
It was established after the secretary general of the Mission laïque française (MLF), Maurice Kuhn, investigated how to establish a French educational programme in Thessaloniki. The school opened in 1906. At the time it was in Salonika Vilayet, Ottoman Empire.

Student enrollment was affected by the Balkan Wars, World War I, and a 1930 Greek law that prohibited Greek children under 12 from being enrolled in international schools. A fire had affected the school grounds in 1917. Enrollment was rising by the late 1930s but the school was dissolved after 1939, as World War II occurred. German soldiers occupying Athens destroyed the FST building as they withdrew. It was partially rebuilt in 1946 since the French Ministry of Foreign Affairs gave a subsidy, and the school had 500 students by the 1950s. Greek authorities recognized the primary school section in the 1960s, and the school building received an expansion in 1961, with annexes opening in Serres and Sidirokastro. A fire destroyed the main building in 1969; its cause was accidental. From 1970 to 1971 rebuilding activity took place. The Greek government recognized the secondary levels of FST in August 2013.

== See also ==
- Agency for French Education Abroad
- Education in France
- International school
- List of international schools
- Mission laïque française
- Multilingualism
- Education in the Ottoman Empire
