= Lycée Eugène Delacroix =

Lycée Eugène Delacroix may refer to:

- Lycée Eugène Delacroix in Drancy, Seine-Saint-Denis (Paris metropolitan area)
- Lycée Eugène Delacroix in Maisons-Alfort, Val-de-Marne (Paris metropolitan area)
- Lycée Franco-Hellénique Eugène Delacroix in Athens, Greece
