= Lycée français Victor Hugo =

French International school of Frankfurt
- Lycée français international Victor-Hugo de Francfort

Location
- Gontardstrasse 11; Frankfurt, Hesse, 60488; Germany; 50.134563°N 8.607964°E

Information
- Principal: Carine Courant
- Age range: from 3 to 18
- Enrollment: 950 (2026)
- Website: www.lfvh.net

Lycée français international Victor-Hugo (LFIVH), also known as Französische Schule Lycee Victor Hugo in German, is a French international school in Frankfurt am Main, Germany

It is directly operated by the Agency for French Education Abroad (AEFE), an agency of the French government. The school serves students from "maternelle" (kindergarten) up to the "lycée" (sixth form college/senior high school) level. The French school is located in the district of Praunheim, to the northwest of Frankfurt. Students are taught the French national curriculum and they can choose to prepare the Baccalauréat or the Abibac. The current head of the school is Mrs Carine Courant.

== History ==
In 1949 the first classes were taught to French students living in Frankfurt. In the 1960s the initiative developed into a school with different classes, an official status and more than 150 students. With 550 students in 2000 the school opened at its current location in Praunheim. The primary school obtained Ersatzschule status in 2007 and the middle school in 2012. By 2014 enrollment had reached 1,000 students, divided into 48 classes.

== About the school ==
- The LFIVH is a French school with an international recruitment: over 35 different nationalities are typically represented.
- The school moved to its current premises in 2000. The building was designed by architect Michel Regembal (also known for his contribution to the Stade de France).
- After being run by parents' associations for decades the school came under AEFE control in 2000.
- In 2007 the primary school obtained Ersatzschule status and so did the middle school in 2012.
- The German Staatliches Schulamt Frankfurt supervises the school's German component of the curriculum and the delivery of the Abitur.
- In September 2014 there were 1004 students registered in the school.
- LFIVH is a whole-day school, including in the primary section.

== Studying at the LFIVH ==
The French national curriculum is demanding and exhaustive. Like all French schools in France and abroad, LFIVH adheres to it.

- If parents and students choose the bilingual (French-German) track, this curriculum is supplemented by essential teachings which fit the German educational requirements. These students usually go on to sit the Abibac, a combination of the French and the German end-of-secondary-education diplomas, allowing them direct access to both French and German universities and colleges.
- The foreign languages students can learn at the LFIVH: German, English, Spanish (as a first, second or third foreign language), and Latin.
- Extra-curricular activities include: chess club, sports club, arts club, drama club, music club, the Students' Council, and many others. Students participate in competitions in mathematics, language arts, sciences and sports in Germany, France and across Europe. Trips are organised on a regular basis to sites around Germany, Austria, France and the UK.
- A study time (Aide aux devoirs) is organised for middle school students who need support for their homework.
- Students with special needs also receive specific support.
- Students from the age of 3 can also attend Le P'tit Victor, the CEFA or l'Académie, all structures independent from the LFIVH but which take care of LFIVH students after class and offer all sorts of activities, including, for some, during the holiday.

== See also ==
- La Gazette de Berlin

German international schools in France:

- Internationale Deutsche Schule Paris
- DFG / LFA Buc
- Deutsche Schule Toulouse
