= The École =

French-American school in New York City

Coordinates: 40.739417°N 73.986088°W

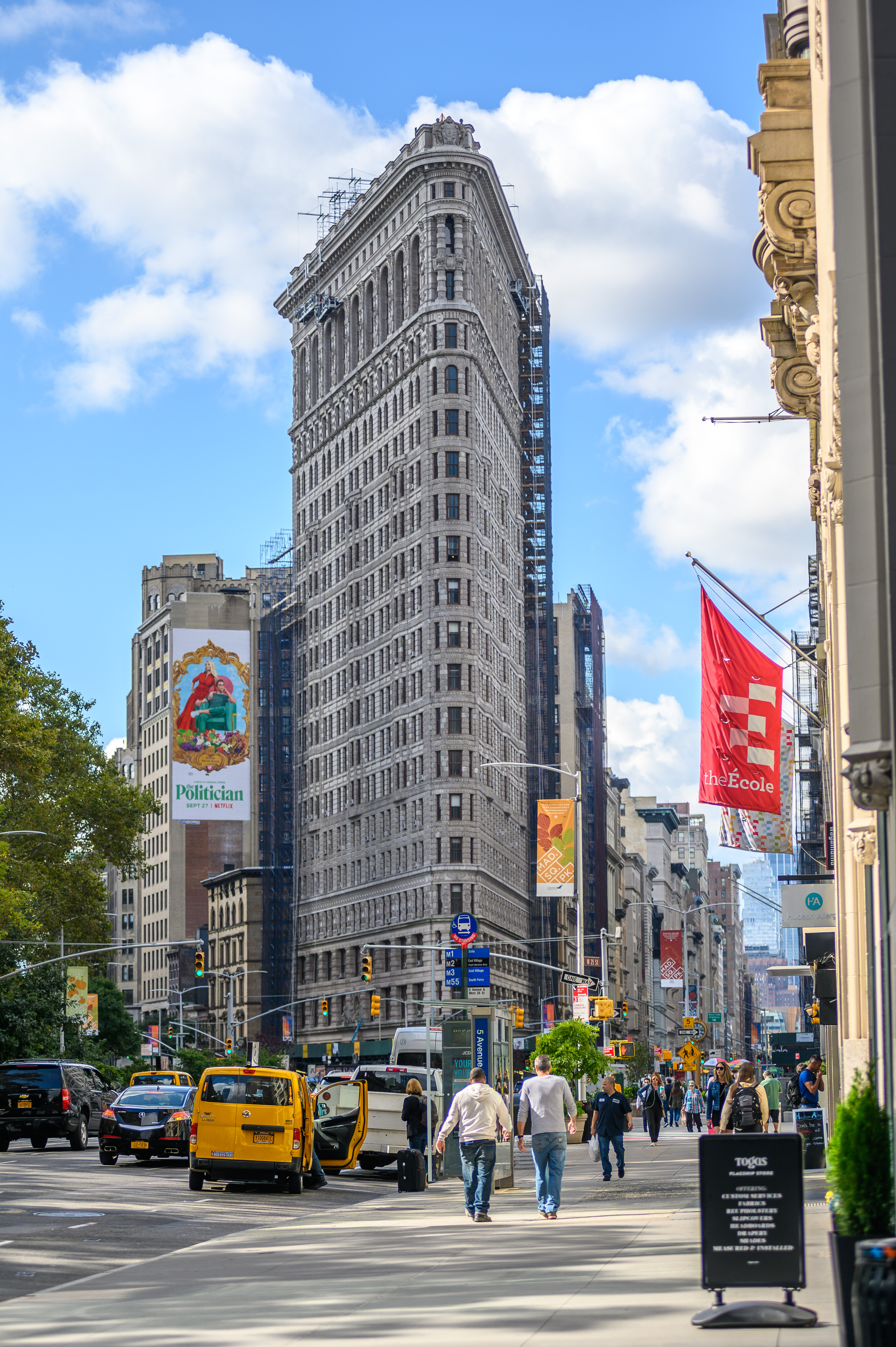
The École Flatiron District

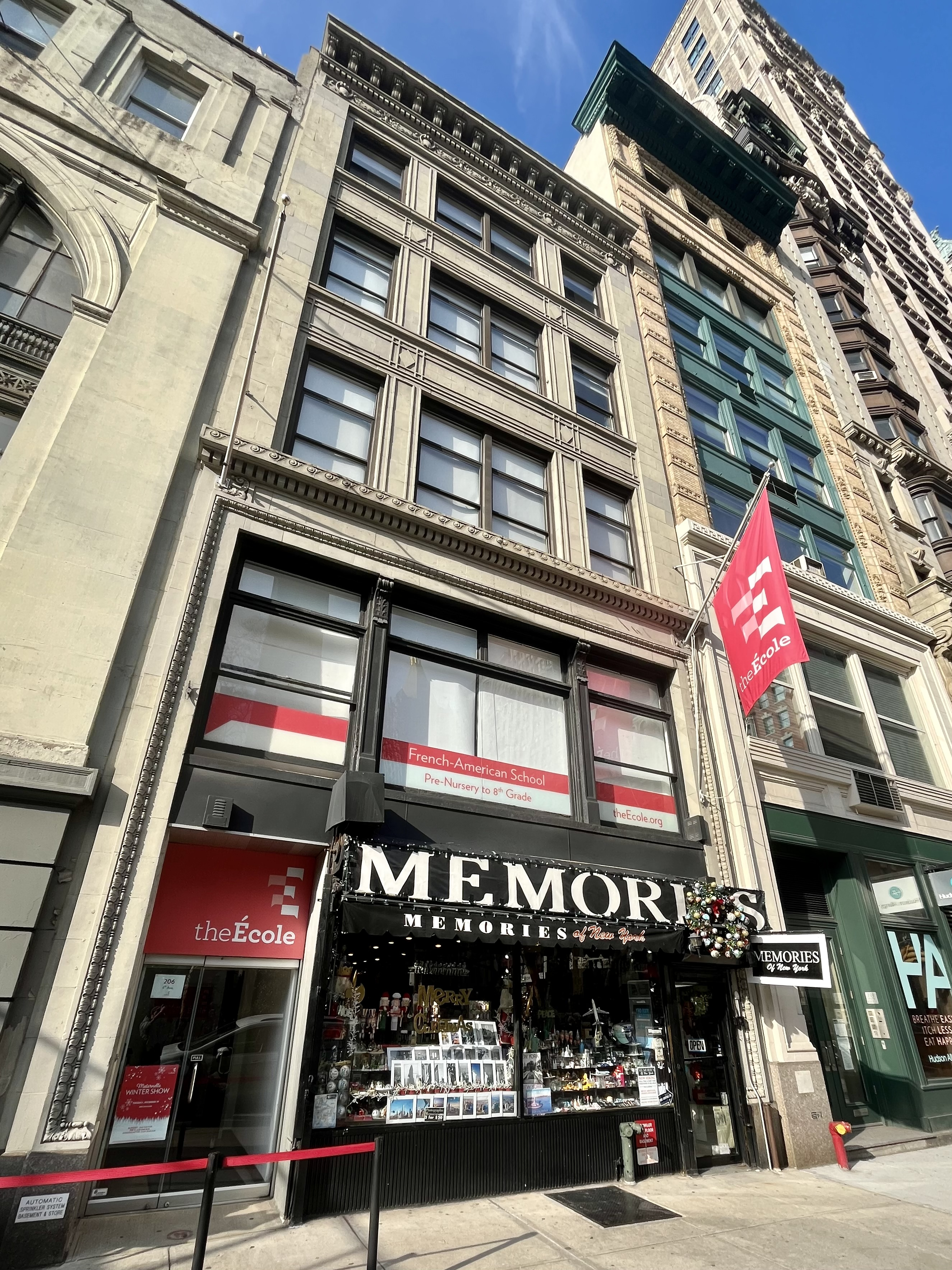
Preschool at 206 Fifth Avenue

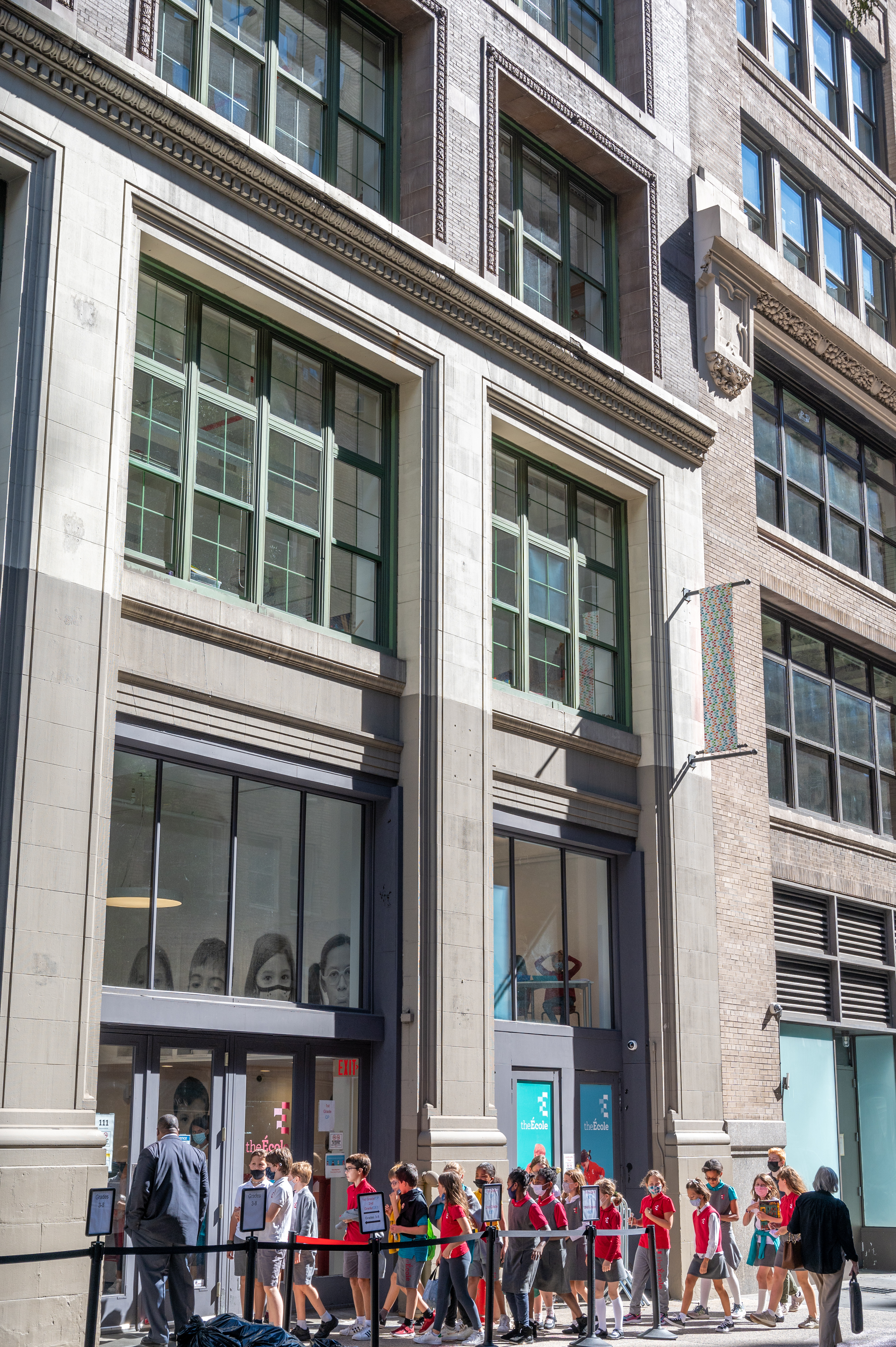
Elementary and Middle School Building, East 22nd Street

The École (formerly École Internationale de New York) is an independent French-American bilingual school in the Flatiron District of Manhattan, New York City. Founded in 2009, the school enrolls students from age two through 8th Grade.

The École follows a French-American curriculum, with students receiving instruction in both French and English throughout their education. The program combines the French national curriculum with elements of the American educational system and is designed to develop proficiency and literacy in both languages.

The school is accredited by the French Ministry of National Education from Maternelle through Middle School and is part of the Agency for French Education Abroad (AEFE) network. It is also affiliated with the Mission Laïque Française (MLF) and is a member of the National Association of Independent Schools (NAIS).

The École has two buildings in Manhattan. Its Maternelle program is located at 206 Fifth Avenue, while students in 1st through 8th Grade attend the school's Elementary and Middle School at 115 East 22nd Street.

The École has over 100 different after-school educational, sporting or artistic activities. It also organizes camps during the October, February, spring, and summer breaks to promote bilingualism. The École students go on field trips to New York's cultural and historic institutions, and on overnight trips in the US and abroad. The École Falcons participate in the Confederation of New York Schools and Team Sports volleyball, basketball, and soccer leagues.

The École Campuses in Manhattan

As of 2026, The École has a student body of 385. Each class has between 12 and 20 students, and each grade level has no more than two classes.

== History ==
The school opened in September 2009, as "Ecole Internationale de New York", making it the third French international school in Manhattan. It was founded by Yves Rivaud, who thought Manhattan needed a real French American bilingual school, and believed he would easily fill the school's enrollment upon opening.

Yves Rivaud retired in August 2020 and was replaced as head of school by Jean-Yves Vesseau. In September 2021, The École opened its first Pre-Nursery class (a bilingual program for 2-year-olds).

=== Léman High School with The École ===
In 2022, The École signed a partnership with Léman Manhattan to create a bilingual high school program. The program is an extension of The École’s French-American dual curriculum in 9th and 10th Grade and transitions to a bilingual IB diploma program during the final two years of high school.

In the summer of 2025, The École’s Elementary & Middle School Building moved next door, from 111 to 115 East 22nd Street, doubling its square footage from 23,000 to 46,000 square feet over two and a half floors, creating larger classrooms, adding more specialty classrooms, and fulfilling its objective of two classes per grade from 1st through 8th Grade.

== Name and symbol ==
In September 2018, the school officially changed its name from the original "Ecole Internationale de New York" to the shorter "The École."

== Tuition ==
The 2026-2027 tuition is $46,500 for the Pre-Nursery and Nursery programs and $50,500 for Pre-K to 8th grade.
