= Lycée Abdel Kader =

- لیسیه عبد القادر

Location
- Beirut; Lebanon
- Coordinates: 33.8915°N 35.4952°E

Information
- Type: Private
- Established: 1909; 117 years ago
- Proviseur: Salim Beldjerba
- Gender: Co-educational
- Enrollment: 1418+
- Colors: Blue and white
- Website: www.lak.edu.lb

Lycée Abdel-Kader (or LAK, Arabic: لیسیه عبد القادر) is a co-educational private school in the Batrakieh district of Beirut, Lebanon. It is part of the Mission laïque française efforts in Lebanon and provides a full cycle education from kindergarten to twelfth grade. All subjects are taught in French with language classes in Arabic and English.

== History ==
The lycée Abdel-Kader whose creation dates back to 1909, had been known till 1985, when it was bought to the Mission laïque française by the Hariri foundation, as the school of young girls, even though it had been a coed school for some time. The school went through multiple stages of expansion which led in 1995 to the construction of an elementary school which allowed it to offer a full cycle of studies that includes kindergarten, which accepts students from the age of three, through twelfth grade. The establishment is a tripartite convention between the Hariri Foundation, the Agence pour l'enseignement français à l'étranger and the Mission laïque française.

The degrees are recognized by both the French ministry of education and the Lebanese ministry of education.

== Grades ==
Lycée Abdel Kader consists of kindergarten/maternelle (first 3 years of school, where the children are aged 3–5 years), elementary school/élémentaire (1st grade until 5th grade), middle school/collège (6th grade until 9th grade) and high school/lycée (10th grade until 12th grade).

== Activities ==
For an additional fee, the establishment offers the option for students to sign up for extracurricular activities.

== See also ==
- Abd al-Qadir al-Jaza'iri
- Education in Lebanon
- List of universities in Lebanon
- Education in the Ottoman Empire
