= Lycée français de Düsseldorf =

French school in Düsseldorf, Germany

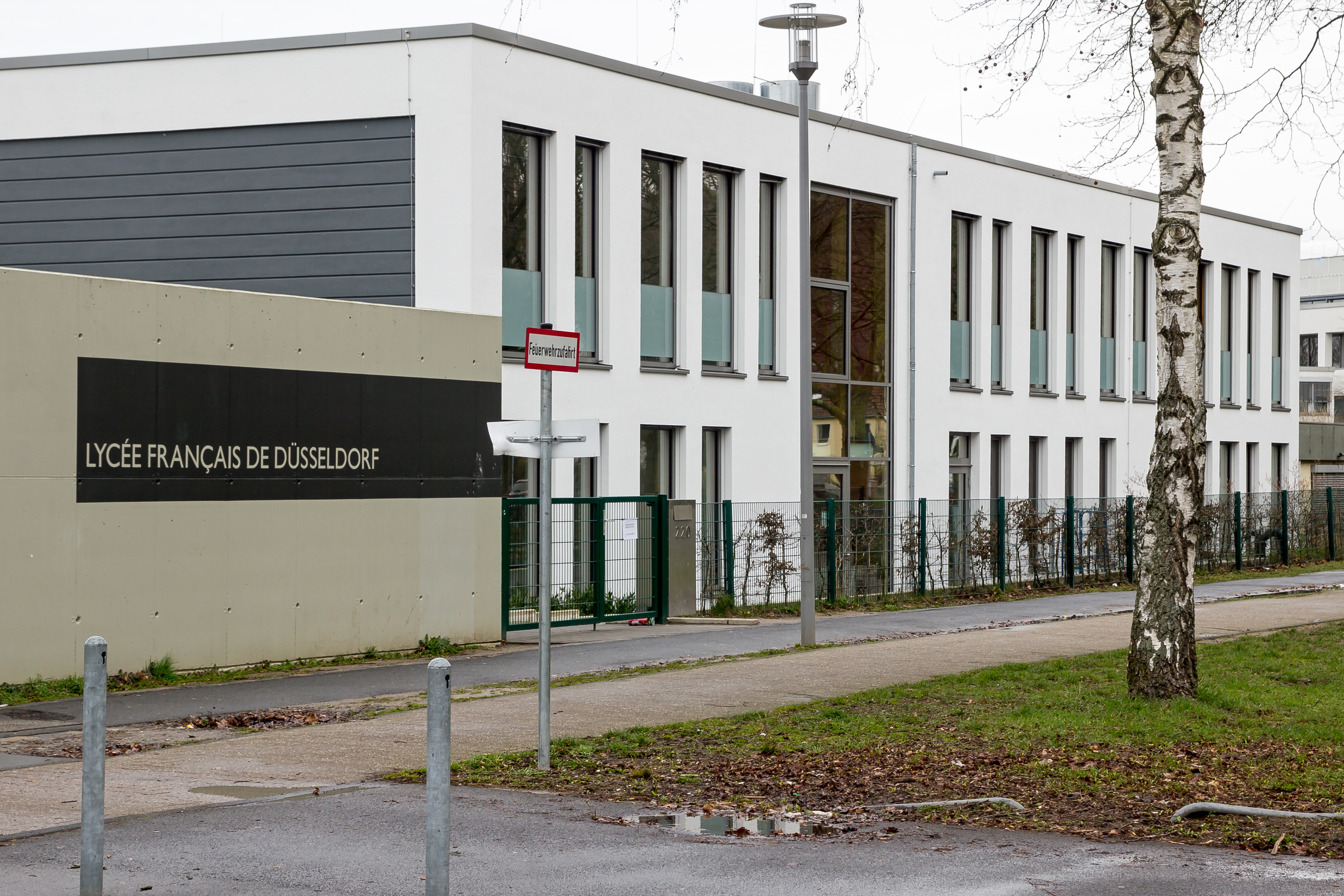
Lycée Français de Düsseldorf

Lycée français international Simone Veil (previously "Lycée français de Düsseldorf" until 2022) is a French international school in Düsseldorf. It serves maternelle (preschool) through lycée (senior high school) levels. The school was created in 1962 and it has 625 pupils as of the school year 2024-2025.

The school is in cooperation with the AEFE network and is led by the principal Philippe Kinder.

== History ==
In 1962, at the initiative of a small group of parents, fifteen children started their first school year in a room located in the garden of the Consulate of France. This was the birth of the French school. In 1985, the school was the victim of an arson attack. The completely devastated buildings were demolished and the reconstruction began very quickly. The city authorities supported the school by alleviating. In 1994, the school opened for high school students, and with that decision the school built a new building with eight classrooms and a laboratory. In 2022 the school celebrated its 60th anniversary, as part of the anniversary the school changed its name to Lycée français international de Simone Veil as a tribute to the french politician Simone Veil. It's also the first school operated by the aefe to receive the label Schule ohne Rassismus - Schule mit Courage.

== Statistics ==
As of the school year 2024-2025, the school had around 625 pupils. Out of these pupils, 42% of them had the french nationality, 22% of them were french binationals, 17% of them had the german nationality, the rest of them (or 19%) had another nationality than the german or french one.

== See also ==
- La Gazette de Berlin

German international schools in France:

- Internationale Deutsche Schule Paris
- DFG / LFA Buc
- Deutsche Schule Toulouse
