= Lycée Jean Mermoz (Senegal) =

French international school in Dakar, Senegal

Lycée Jean Mermoz is a French international school in Dakar, Senegal. It serves maternelle (preschool) until terminale (final year of lycée or senior high school).

It is directly operated by the Agency for French Education Abroad (AEFE), an agency of the French government.

The current campus opened on 19 November 2010.

== See also ==
- Leopold Sedar Senghor French Institute
