= Lycée Français de Chicago =

Location
- 1929 W. Wilson Ave. Chicago, Illinois 60640; United States; 41.9649°N 87.67771°W

Information
- School type: Private
- Established: 1995
- President: Eric M. Veteau
- Grades: PK-12
- Enrollment: 820
- Average class size: 16-21
- Student to teacher ratio: 5.5:1
- Language: French, English, Spanish, German, Mandarin, and Latin
- Colors: Red, White, and Blue
- Athletics conference: LAS and CAC
- Team name: Lycée Flames
- Newspaper: Le Grand Coq
- Tuition: $29,000
- Website: www.lyceechicago.org

The Lycée Français de Chicago is a private, French international school located in Ravenswood / Lincoln Square, Chicago, Illinois. It offers a dual French and English curriculum. The Lycée is founded on the French National Curriculum as defined by the French Ministry of Education and complemented by an English language program in addition to foreign language courses.

== History ==
The private school was founded in 1995 by a group of French and American parents, with backing from French businesses and the support of the Consul General of France in Chicago. The Lycée is accredited by the French Ministry of Education and is listed on the official directory of the French Schools in Foreign Countries as part of the AEFE French worldwide network which includes over 450 schools outside France. The school is also registered with the Illinois State Board of Education and accredited by the Independent School Association of Central States (ISACS). The Lycée Français de Chicago opened with 134 students. Today the school has over 850 American and foreign national students representing more than 30 nationalities, including French, American, Italian, Dutch, Austrian, German, Norwegian, Swedish, Greek, Czech, Polish, Ukrainian, Hungarian, Russian, Turkish, Pakistani, Canadian, English, Scottish, Irish, Croatian, Serbian, South African, Haitian, Japanese, Chinese and many more.

== Funding and direction ==
The Lycée is funded in part by the AEFE, l'Agence pour l'Enseignement Français à l'Étranger, but remains an entirely private school with no connection to the French Government. The school is run by the Board of Trustees, composed of parents and alumni, but day-to-day operations are overseen by Éric Veteau, the head of the school, Sarah Whalen, the head of Secondary, and Pascal Léon, the head of Primary.

== Campus ==
In 2015, the Lycée moved to a new campus designed by STL Architects on the corner of Damen Avenue and Wilson Avenues in Ravenswood, west of the previous campus in Uptown.

== Curriculum ==
The school has a structural curriculum mandated by the French Ministry of Education and an English curriculum developed using guidelines from the National Council of Teachers of English and the State of Illinois.

The program conforms to the French system. It is broken down into subdivisions that roughly correspond to those in the American school system: pre-kindergarten, junior kindergarten and kindergarten, elementary school (1st through 5th grades), middle school (6 through 9th grades), and high school (10th through 12th grades).

The program from pre-K through 5th grade is divided into cycles: cycle 1 (pre-kindergarten, junior kindergarten and kindergarten), cycle 2 (1st and 2nd grade) and cycle 3 (3rd through 5th grade).

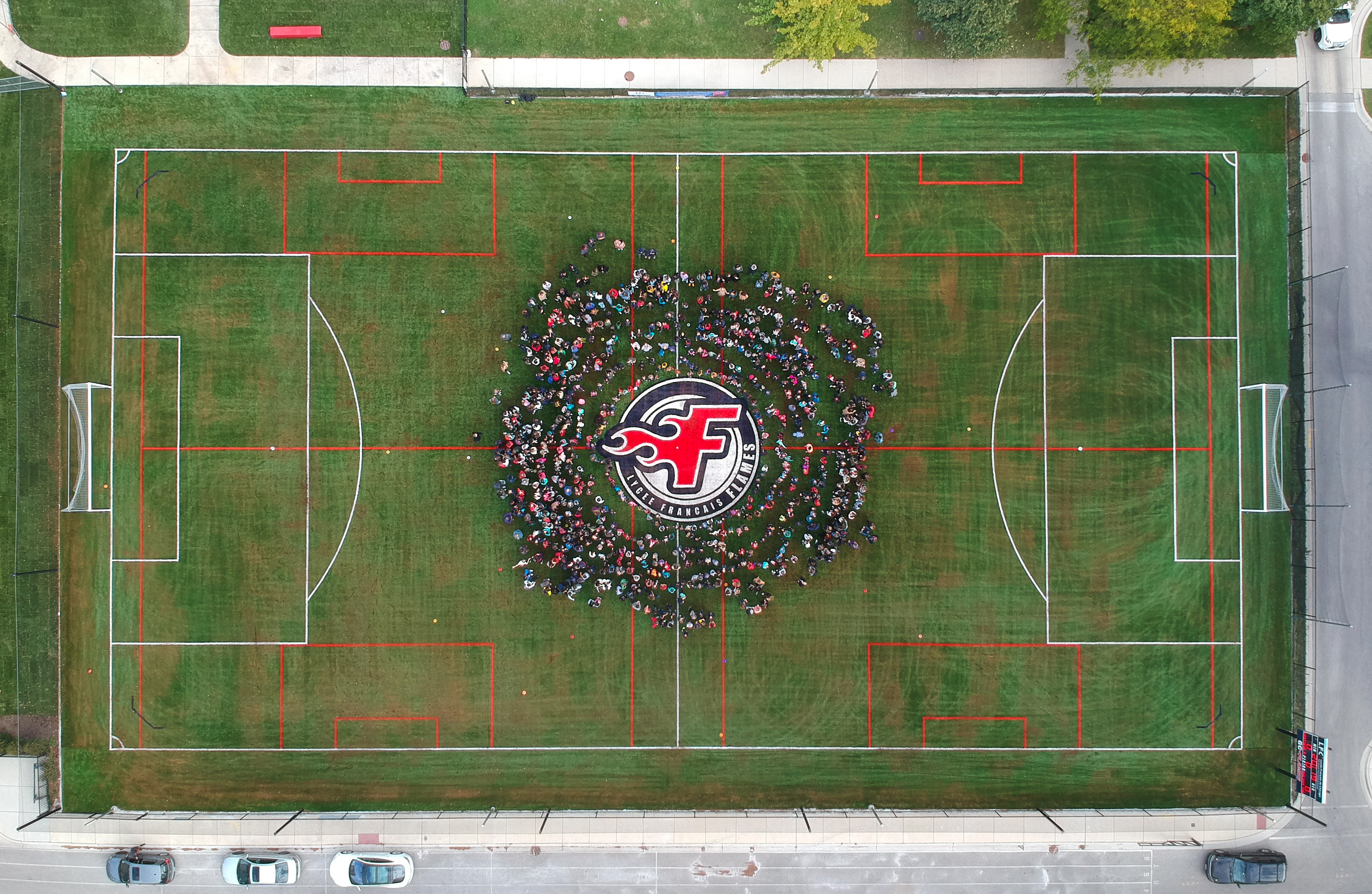
Drone photograph of students on the soccer field.

Middle school (collège) comprises grade 6 through 9. Instruction is structured according to subjects: French, English, mathematics, history, geography, civics, biology, technology, art, music and physical education. Beginning in grade 7 students also study physics and Latin.

Starting in fourth grade, students learn a third language, either Mandarin, Spanish, or German. As part of the language curriculum, each language class does a cultural exchange for two weeks with another French school in the country they are studying. In high school, they are also given the opportunity to do a three-month study abroad trip.

Middle school also offers the OIB curriculum which is the International Baccalaureate Option, which focuses in addition to French history and literature on American and world history and literature.

Grades 10, 11 and 12 define high school in the French system and those 3 years are known as lycée. During the lycée years students choose a track with emphasis on different courses: track L (literature), ES (economics and social sciences) or S (sciences), which, as the French Department of Education reforms its curriculum, is set to change in 2021.

The lycée years, as well as the curriculum as a whole, prepare the students for the French general Baccalaureate examination and the international option of the French Baccalaureate. With the Baccalaureate degree, students of the Lycée Français de Chicago can enter selective American or European schools, colleges, or universities.

The Lycée also offers the International Baccalaureate Middle Years Programme and Diploma Programme for English-speaking high school students.

== See also ==
- Agence pour l'enseignement français à l'étranger
- Education in France
- International Baccalaureate
- European Baccalaureate

American schools in France:

- American School of Paris - An American international school in France
- American School of Grenoble
