= Lycée Paul Valéry (Morocco) =

Coordinates: 33.8894°N 5.5397°W

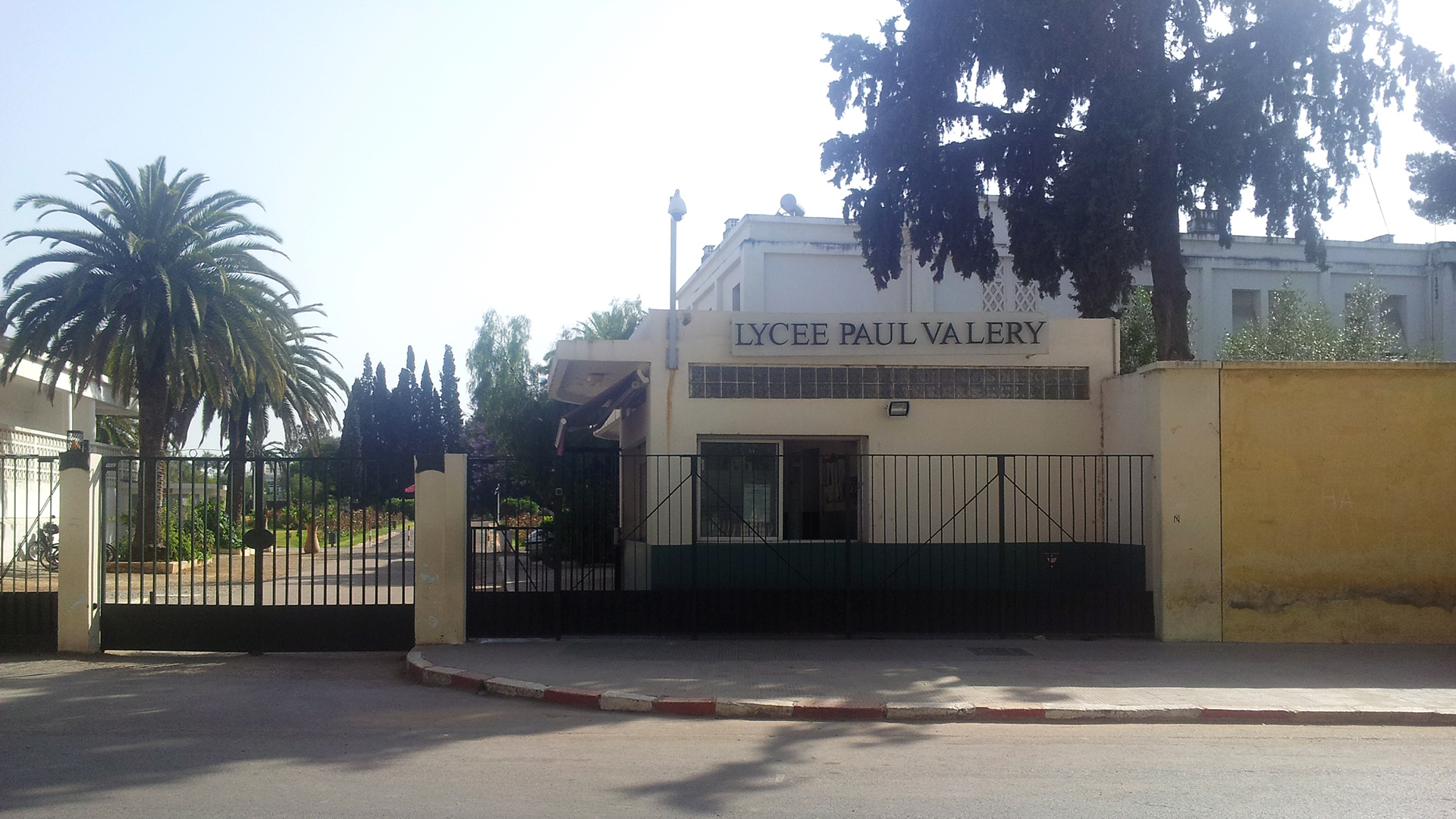

Location
- Meknes; Morocco

Information
- Former name: École française de Meknès
- School type: International School
- Established: 1914; 111 years ago
- Language: French

Lycée Paul Valéry (LPV) is a French international school in Meknès, Morocco. It serves levels maternelle (preschool) through lycée (senior high school). It is named after the French poet Paul Valéry.

It is directly operated by the Agency for French Education Abroad (AEFE), an agency of the French government.

It was originally established as the École française de Meknès in 1914. Its current building opened in a former barracks in 1962, and the school received its current name that year.

The campus has over 16 hectares (40 acres) of space.
