= Lycée français Jean Monnet =

School in Brussels, Belgium

Coordinates: 50.78889°N 4.34542°E

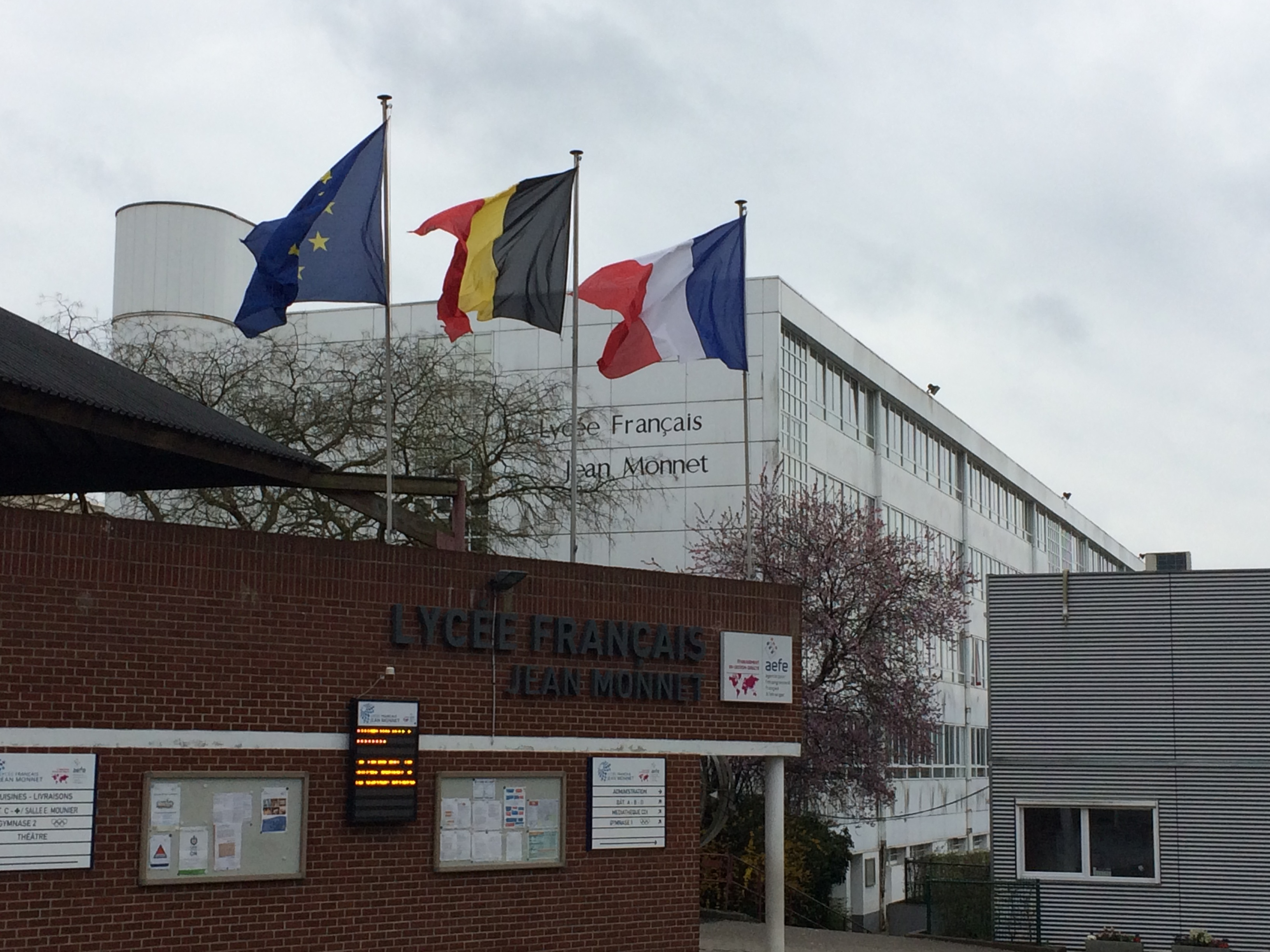
- Lycée français Jean Monnet

Location
- 9, Avenue du Lycée Français; Brussels, 1180; Belgium

Information
- Funding type: Public and private
- Established: c. 1907
- Gender: M/F
- Age: 4 to 18
- Language: French
- Website: http://www.lyceefrancais-jmonnet.be/index.php

The Lycée français Jean Monnet (lit. 'Jean Monnet French High School', abbreviated LFB or LFJM) is a school in the municipality of Uccle in Brussels, Belgium.

It is directly operated by the Agency for French Education Abroad (AEFE), an agency of the French government. The LFB follows the French study curriculum and has students from nursery school up to the French baccalauréat. As of 2020, the school hosted about 2719 students.

== See also ==
- Education in France
