= Lycée Français International de Mumbai =

Coordinates: 19.0039°N 72.8150°E

The French International School of Mumbai
- Lycée Français International de Mumbai
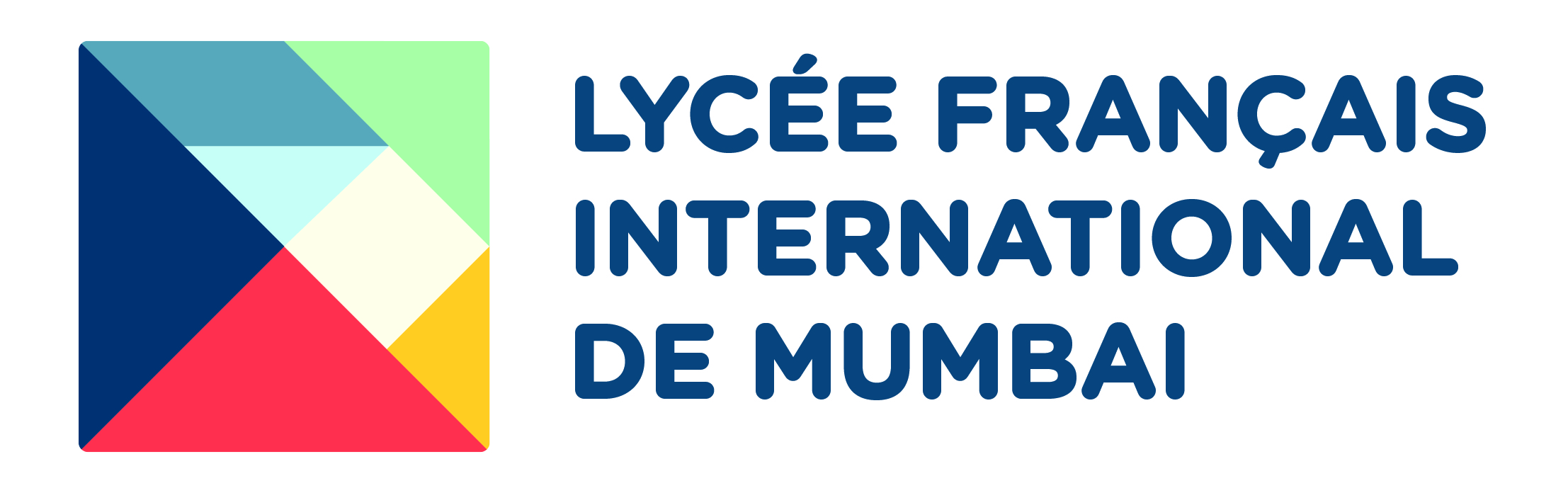
- Urmi Estate Compound, 95, Ganpatrao Kadam Marg, Lower Parel, Mumbai 400013, Maharashtra, India

Information
- Other names: LFIM
- Former name: Ecole Française Internationale de Bombay
- School type: Private
- Founded: 1983
- Authorizer: AEFE
- Head of school: Eric PETROS
- Grades: Pre-Kindergarten - Grade 12
- Gender: Co-educational
- Average class size: 25
- Language: French & English
- Color: Blue
- Newspaper: La Lettre du LFIM
- Tuition: Disclosed by the school, through appointment only
- Website: www.lfim.in

Lycée Français International de Mumbai (The French International School of Mumbai), commonly referred to as LFIM, is a private French international school in Lower Parel, Mumbai, India. Established in 1983, its levels range from Pre-Kindergarten all the way to senior high school (ages 2 through 18). The school is the only bilingual school in Mumbai and was formerly known as Ecole Française Internationale de Mumbai (EFIB).

The school follows the French Baccalaureate programme, not to be confused with IB, and its curriculum abides by the official programs of the national French education system, as directed by AEFE. The school is multilingual, which exposes the students to a large variety of different culture and 60% of the faculty hails from France.

The school is welcoming to students and teachers of different nationalities and stresses the importance of learning in both English and French simultaneously. The school is one of the few schools in South Mumbai to welcome students from the age of 2 years and has a mix of expatriate and local students. LFIM also provides a unique kindergarten system, wherein students stay until 3 pm and enjoy the benefits associated with a full school day.

Both The American School of Bombay and LFIM are considered the two most exclusive international schools in Mumbai.

== History ==
LFIM was founded in 1983 in the Breach Candy neighbourhood of South Mumbai as a school to promote the French way of learning, which focuses on attaining skills. The school later relocated to Worli and is now situated at its Lower Parel campus.

The Lycée is accredited by the French Ministry of Education and is listed on the official directory of the French Schools in Foreign Countries as part of the AEFE French worldwide network which includes over 552 schools outside France.

== Accreditation ==
The school is recognized and overseen by the Agency for French Education Abroad (AEFE), and is under Indian governing laws. AEFE's network of schools consists of 552 other institutions in well over 138 countries.

The school is run by the Managing Committee, composed of parents, but day-to-day operations are overseen by the head of the school, Mr. Bruno LE BRIZE.

The school is also supported by the French Consulate in Mumbai.

== Academic curriculum ==
LFIM's academic curriculum provides a rigorous and unique bilingual and bicultural education with the principal language of instruction being French. The school has a structural curriculum mandated by the French Ministry of Education, and an English curriculum developed using guidelines from the Cambridge English Curriculum.

From Pre-Kindergarten to Grade 5, the curriculum is taught 50% in French and 50% in English.

In Middle and High school, the curriculum is 70% in French and 40% in English. Additionally, Spanish and German are offered as secondary languages as well. The Programme follows the French national curriculum as directed by AEFE. At the end of Grade 9, students take the DNB examination (Diplôme National du Brevet).

The Baccalaureate or BAC (not to be confused with the International Baccalaureate or IB) is an exam-driven two-year programme which the students complete in the 11th and 12th grades.

All admissions from Grade 7 and above require a minimum B1 in French, for students not part of the French curriculum.

== Baccalauréat ==
In Grade 12, students sit for the Baccalauréat exams, which are directly graded by the French Ministry of Education, Government of France. With this certificate in hand, students can enrol in all government recognised colleges and universities in India, after an agreement between France and India for the Mutual Recognition of Academic Qualifications was signed during President Emmanuel Macron's maiden State visit to India in 2018. Besides France, the certificate is also recognised by USA, UK, Canada, Australia and many other nations.

== Extra-curricular activities ==
The school offers a wide and diverse variety of extracurricular activities, this includes, kickboxing, soccer, Bollywood dancing, taekwando, yoga, chess, robotics and arts and crafts.

== New Campus ==
Since September 2019, the school has shifted to a new building at Lower Parel. The campus hosts a variety of facilities like a swimming pool, an advanced air filtration system and two multipurpose sports grounds; an indoor basement version as well as an outdoor terrace option. The new campus was officially inaugurated in 2020.

== See also ==
- List of schools in Mumbai
