= Lycée Descartes (Rabat) =

Coordinates: 33.9906°N 6.8456°W

- Lycée Descartes
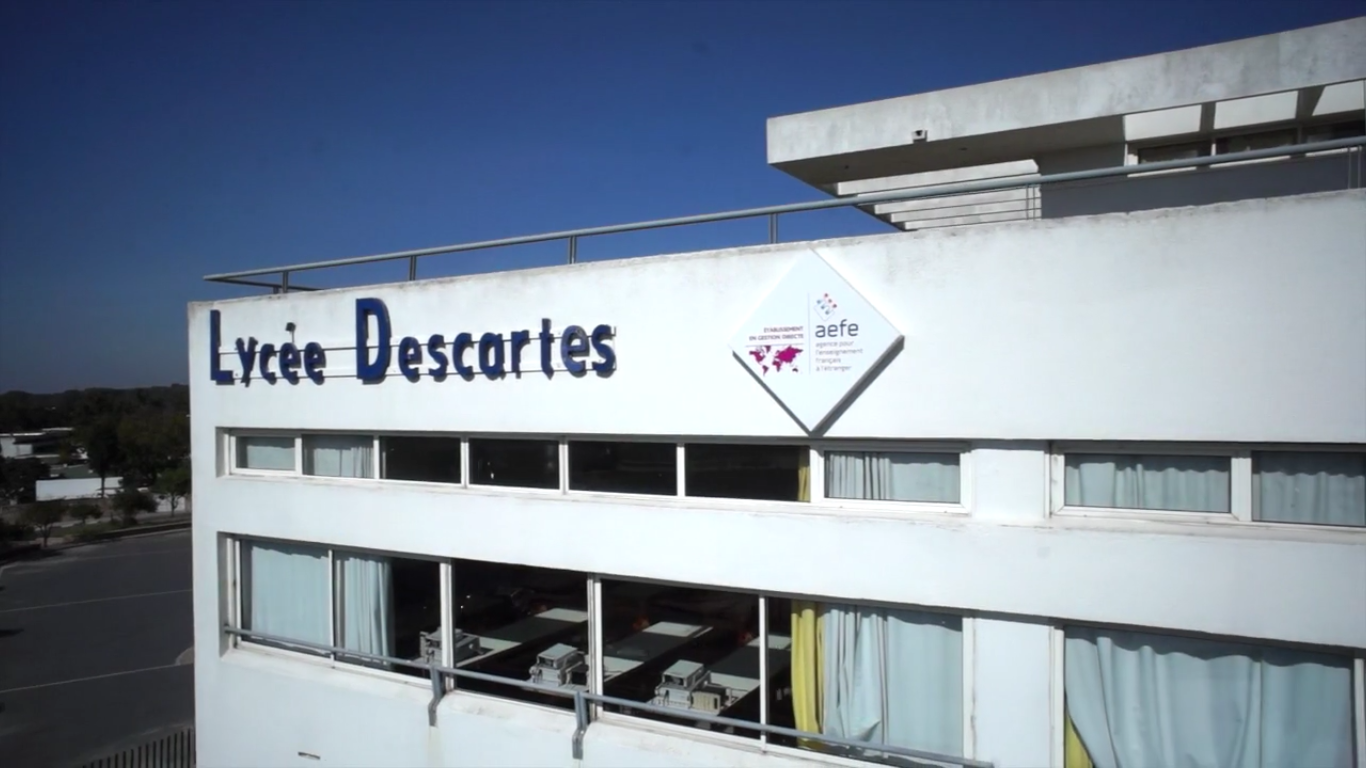
- Rabat; Morocco

Lycée Descartes (formerly known as Lycée Gouraud) is a French international school in Rabat, Morocco.

The establishment is directly managed by the AEFE, an agency under the administration of the French Ministry of Foreign Affairs, that assures the quality of schools teaching the French national curriculum outside France. The lycee is affiliated with the Academy of Bordeaux in France. It replaced the first French junior high establishment in Morocco, "Le Lycée Gouraud" which was built in 1919 during the French Protectorate, and later became a public high school named after the late king Hassan II.

This school, which opened in October 1963 in the Agdal neighborhood of Rabat, is one of the largest French education institutions in Morocco. It has 2,500 students, of various national origins: 48% French, 48% Moroccan, and 4% other internationals, and spans middle school classes through classes préparatoires aux grandes écoles.

The Lycée Descartes produced many notable Moroccan and French politicians, scientists, executives, athletes and cultural icons.
