= Lycée Anne de Kyiv =

Lycée Français Anne de Kyiv
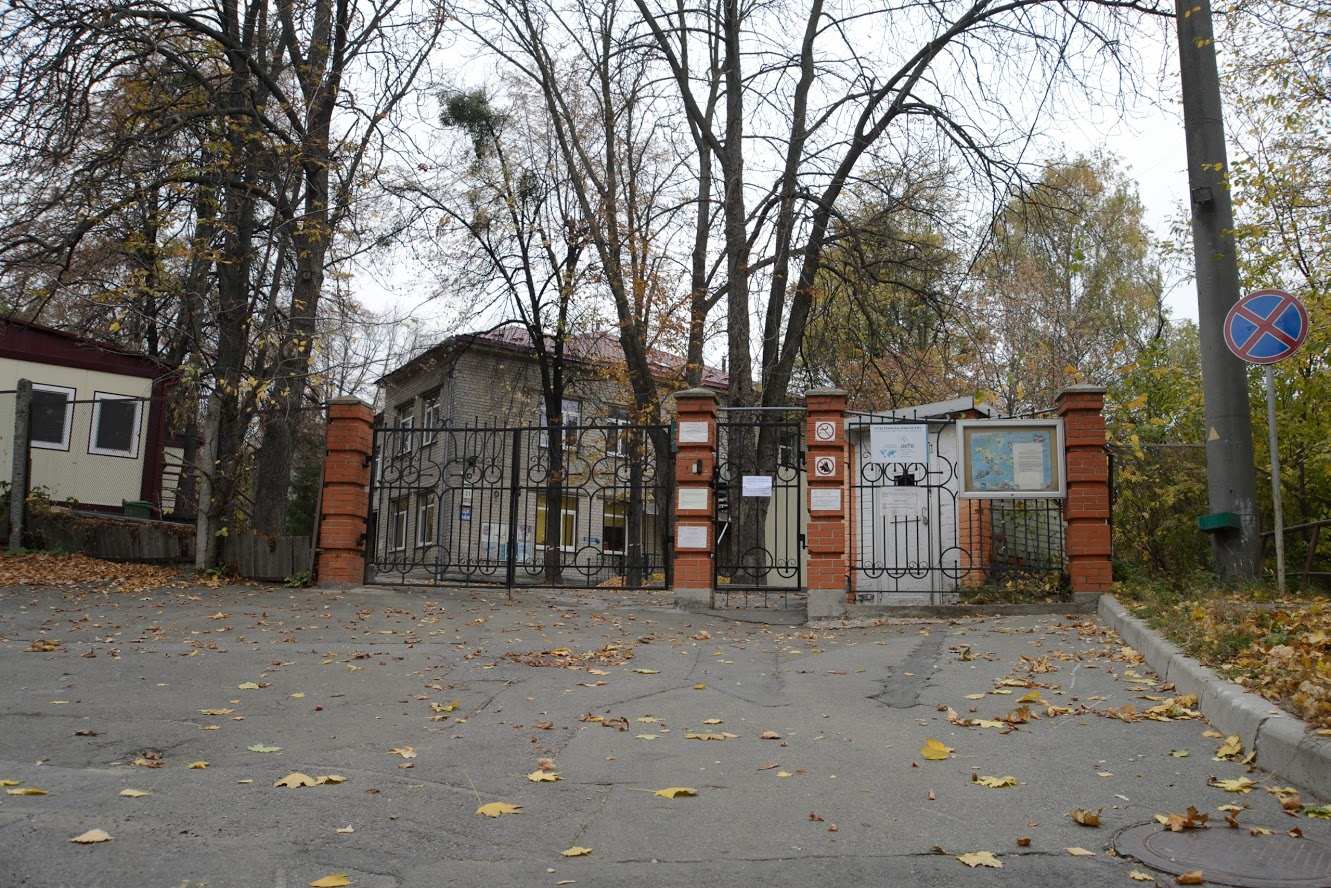
- Street view of schoolground entrance

Location
- Vy'acheslava Lypyns'koho street 21; Kyiv; Ukraine
- 50°26′56″N 30°30′08″E

Information
- Type: French international school
- Established: 1994; 32 years ago
- Website: lyceeadk.com

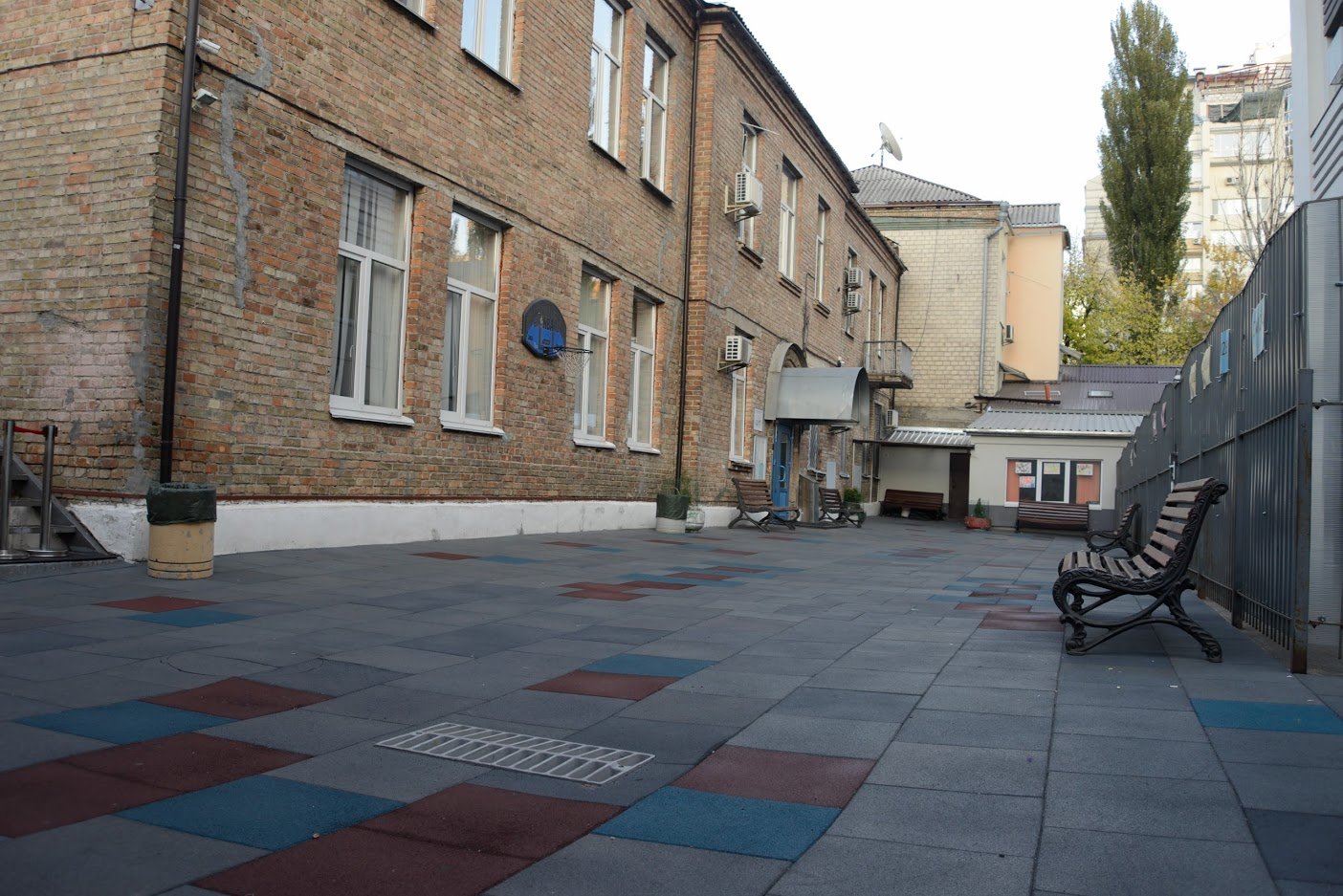
Building

Lycée Français Anne de Kyiv (LFADK) is a French public co-educational international day school from Maternelle – 12 located in Kyiv, Ukraine and named after Anne of Kyiv. It is linked to the French Ministry of Foreign Affairs, is approved by the AEFE (Agency for French Teaching Abroad), and regulated by French authorities.

== History ==
It was established in 1994 as the Petite École Anne de Kiev. In 2005, it was renamed to the Collège Français Anne de Kiev, since it gained junior high school classes. In 2010, the name changed to Lycée Français Anne de Kiev as it gained lycée (sixth form/senior high school) classes. The spelling of "Kiev" in the school's French name was later changed to "Kyiv".
