= Lycée Jules Verne (South Africa) =

Coordinates: 26.0791°S 28.0471°E

Location
- Main: Corner Bauhinia and Cestrum, Morningside Ext 40; Pretoria Campus: 816 - 818 George Avenue Corner George & Eastwood, Eastwood – Arcadia, Pretoria

Information
- Established: 1992
- Website: lyceejulesverne.com

Lycée Jules Verne (LJV) is a French international school in South Africa. The main campus is in Sandton, Johannesburg, while the Pretoria Campus is in Arcadia, Pretoria. It is a part of the Agency for French Education Abroad (AEFE). It covers levels pre-primary until high school.

== Maps ==
Campuses
Johannesburg campus
Pretoria campus
