= Lycée Vincent van Gogh La Haye-Amsterdam =

Coordinates: 52.1022°N 4.2796°E

Lycée français Vincent-Van-Gogh
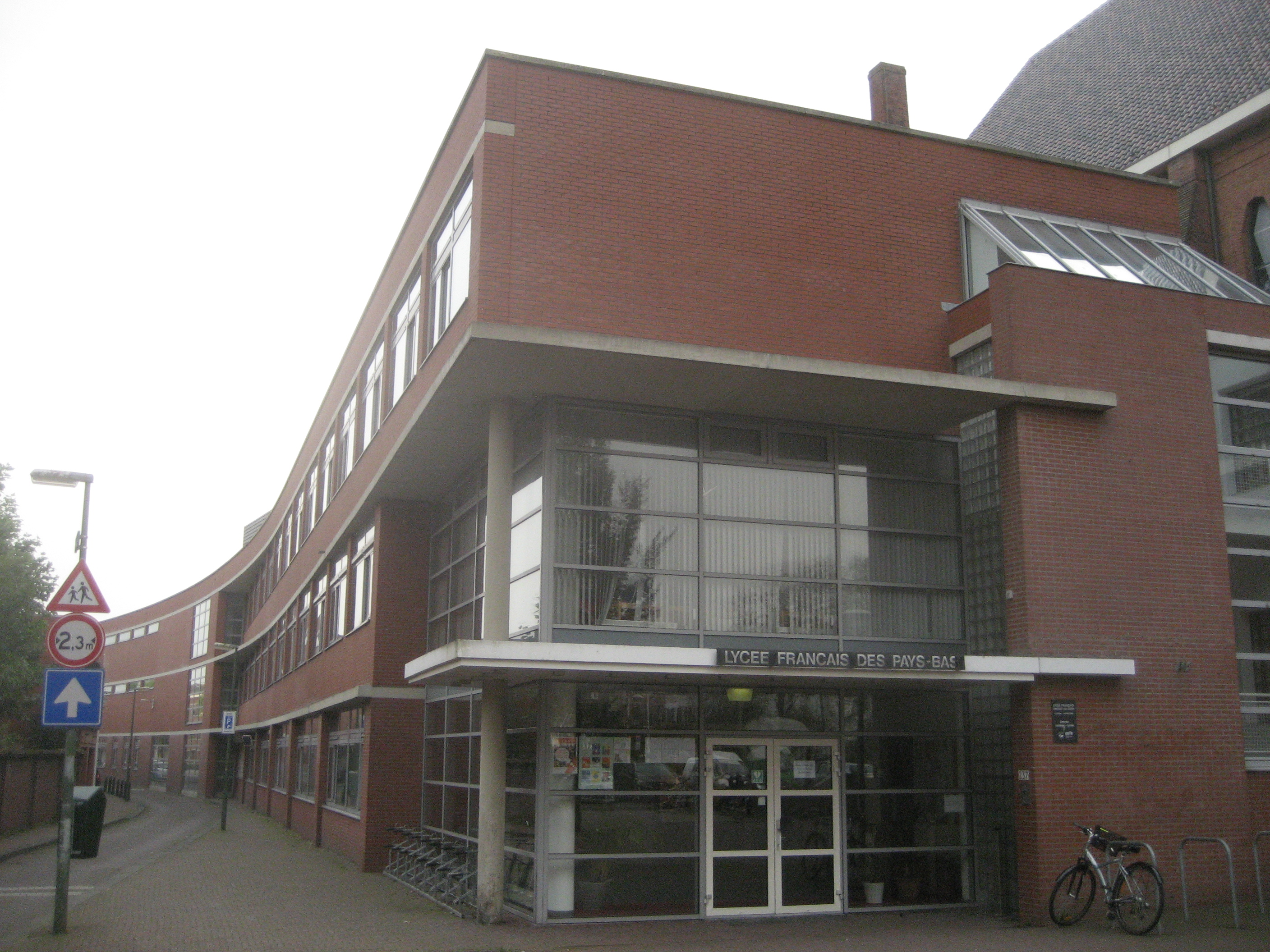
- Campus The Hague
- The Netherlands

Information
- Opened: 1948
- School district: Agency for French Education Abroad
- Principal: Ouardda Roubi-Gonnot
- Faculty: Antoine Pelon
- Campus size: 900 (2012)
- Website: lyceevangogh.nl

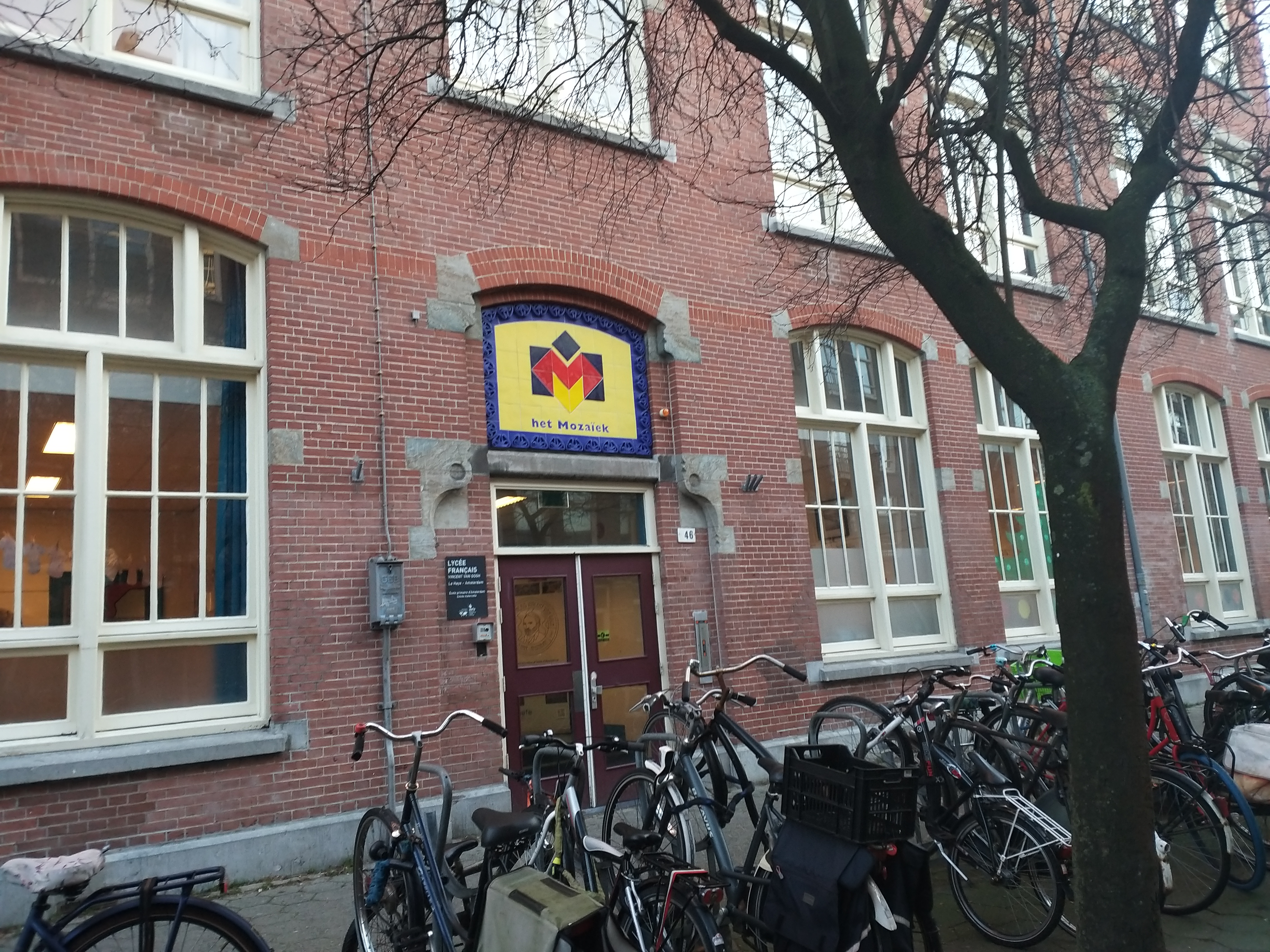
Amsterdam campus

Lycée Vincent van Gogh La Haye-Amsterdam is a French international school in the Netherlands. It has one campus in The Hague and two campuses in Amsterdam. The campus in The Hague serves primary school through lycée (senior high school). The Amsterdam campus only has a primary school.

It is directly operated by the Agency for French Education Abroad (AEFE), an agency of the French government.

Campus in The Hague
Campus in Amsterdam
