= Lycée Français Toronto =

French international school in Toronto

Coordinates: 43.6935°N 79.4490°W

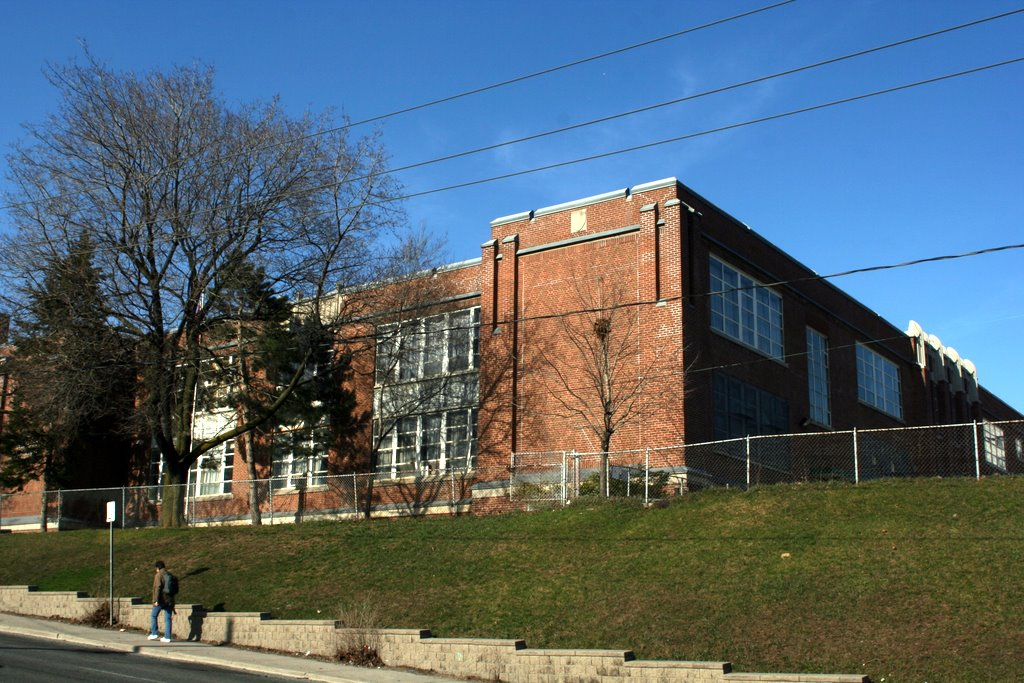
Lycée Français Toronto at 2327 Dufferin Street (formerly D.B. Hood Public School)

Lycée Français Toronto (LFT) is a French international school in the Fairbank neighbourhood of Toronto. It serves levels from preschool through secondary education and, as of 2015, enrolled approximately 450 students. The school was established in 1995 and is part of the Agency for French Education Abroad (AEFE).

The school previously occupied premises at 77 Charles Street West before relocating in 2008 to its current campus at 2327 Dufferin Street, a former D.B. Hood Public School building leased from the Toronto District School Board.

== Operations ==
As of 2014, the largest class sizes were approximately 18 students per class.

=== Leadership ===
The Head of School is Barbara Martin. The Consul General of France in Toronto serves as Honorary Chairman of the school; this role has been held by Bertrand Pous.

== Academic program ==
Lycée Français Toronto follows the French national curriculum from preschool through upper secondary education. Instruction emphasizes the development of foundational academic skills and bilingual proficiency in French and English, with English-language instruction beginning in early childhood.

At the secondary level, students pursue a broad general education with increasing subject specialization in the final years. Additional modern languages are offered alongside French and English. The school prepares students for the French Baccalauréat and the French International Baccalauréat (BFI), diplomas awarded by the French Ministry of National Education that provide access to higher education in France and internationally.

== Clubs ==
- Archery Club
- French Club
- Mathletes
- English Club
- Ski Club
- Astronomy Club
- Marius Club
- Animal Club

== Student body ==
As of the 2013–2014 school year, approximately 60% of students were Canadian and 30% were French, with the remaining students representing other nationalities.
