= Lycée Franco-Bolivien =

Lycée Franco-Bolivien Alcide d'Orbigny Spanish: Colegio Franco Boliviano Alcide d'Orbigny
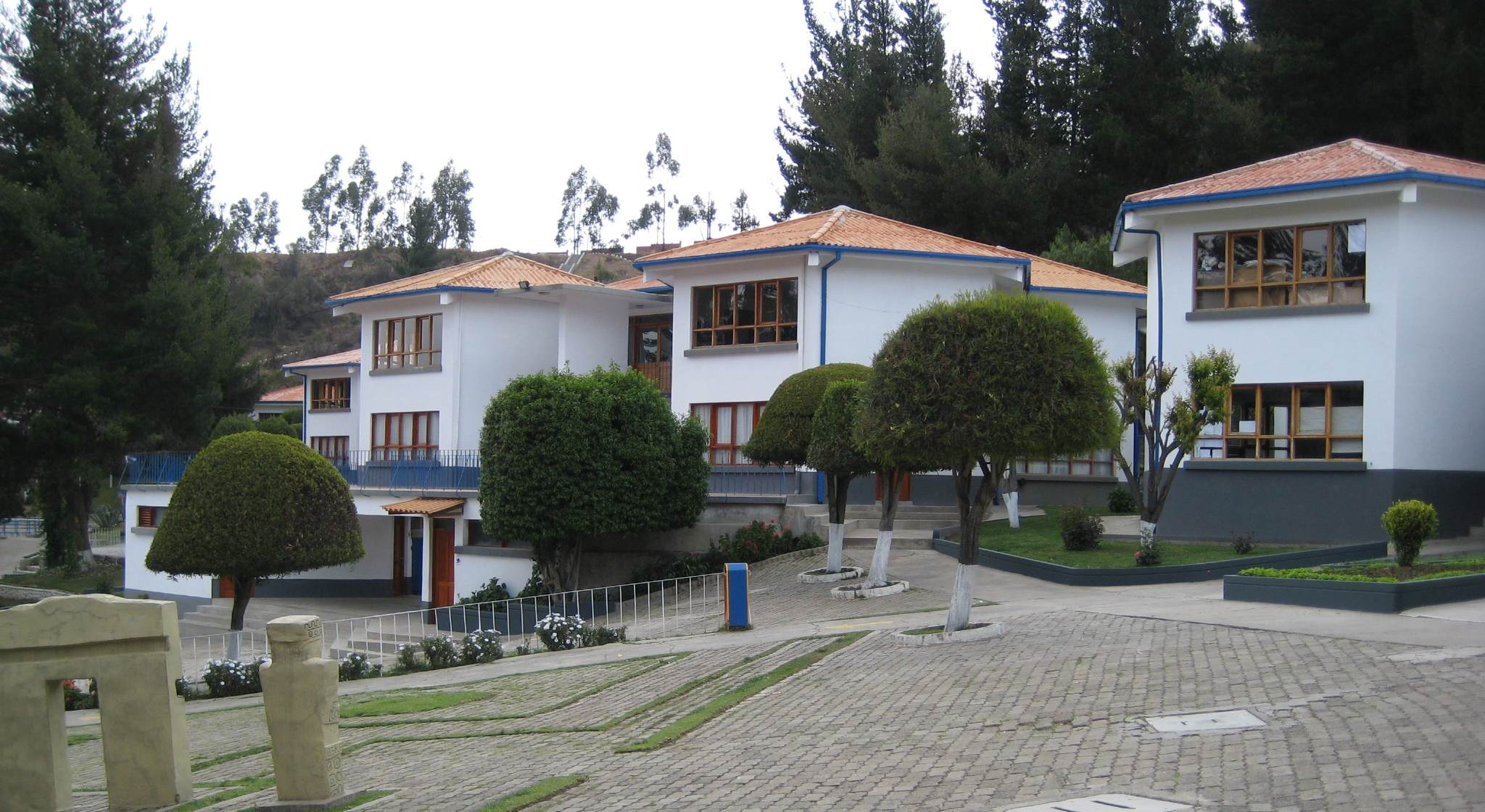

Information
- School type: International School
- Language: French
- Website: https://francobolivien.edu.bo/lfb/fr/

Lycée Franco-Bolivien Alcide d'Orbigny (Spanish: Colegio Franco Boliviano Alcide d'Orbigny) is a French international school in La Paz, Bolivia. The school serves primaire (primary school), through the final year of lycée (senior high school), terminale.

The school has a statue of its namesake, French naturalist Alcide d'Orbigny, colegio religioso.
