= Lycée Français International de Delhi =

School in India

Lycée International Français de Delhi

Location
- 2, Aurangzeb road Delhi 110011 India; Chanakyapuri, New Delhi, India; 28.6031958°N 77.22141290000002°E

Information
- Type: Private, International
- Website: lfidelhi.org

Lycée Français International de Delhi, formerly Lycée Français de Delhi (LFD), is a French international school in Delhi, India. It serves levels maternelle (preschool) through lycée (senior high school).
