= Lycée Saint-Exupéry de Ouagadougou =

International school in Burkina Faso

Coordinates: 12.3643°N 1.5243°W

The Lycée français Saint Exupéry is a French international school in Ouagadougou, Burkina Faso.

It serves levels maternelle (preschool) through lycée (senior high school). It was established in 1975. The secondary school is in the centre of the city while the primary school is in proximity to the hôtel Indépendance.

As of 2016 there are about 125 employees and 1,000 students.
