= Lycée Français de Caracas =

French international school in Caracas, Venezuela

Lycée Français de Caracas (Spanish: Colegio Francia Caracas) is a French international school in the Campo Claro area of Caracas, Venezuela. The school serves levels TPS through lycée (senior high school).

The Liceo Pascal first opened on 15 September 1952.
