= Lycée Français de Málaga =

French international school in Málaga, Spain

- Liceo Francés de Málaga

Location
- Málaga, Spain; Spain
- Coordinates: 36.7292°N 4.3834°W

Information
- Type: French international school
- Established: 1968
- Grades: Petite section–Terminale

Lycée Français de Málaga (Spanish: Liceo Francés de Málaga) is a French international school in Málaga, Spain. It serves levels petite section through terminale, the final year of lycée (senior high school/sixth form college). It occupies a former sports club.

== History ==
The Ecole Française de Málaga (Escuela Francesa de Málaga) was formed on 15 September 1968 by the merger of three smaller schools: a French school in Torremolinos opened by three French teachers in 1966, another French school in Torremolinos opened in 1967, and a French school in Málaga opened in 1967. The French consul general in Malaga had asked the schools to merge.

The school initially occupied the "Villa Rosa" building on Paseo de Reding. It received 120 students in its first year even though it had expected to get 80 students. It moved to a Paseo de Sancha facility in 1972. It received its second facility in 1981. By June 1986 the name changed to the current one as its sixth form programme had opened. It moved to its current campus that month.

== See also ==
- Liceo Español Luis Buñuel, a Spanish international school near Paris, France
