= Lycée Français de Saint Domingue =

Location
- Rafael Damirón Esq. Jimenez Moya Centro de los Heroes Santo Domingo República Dominicana; Santo Domingo; Dominican Republic
- Coordinates: 18.4463463°N 69.92581439999998°W

Information
- Type: K-12 school
- Established: 1990
- Grades: K-12
- Website: lfsd.edu.do

Lycée Français de Saint Domingue is a French international school in Santo Domingo, Dominican Republic.

It serves levels maternelle (preschool), starting from petite section, through lycée (senior high school).

The Lycée Français de Saint Domingue is part of is part of the AEFE network.
