= Lycée Français Charles de Gaulle, Ankara =

French language high school in Ankara, Turkey

The official logo of the Lycée Français Charles de Gaulle

Lycée Français Charles de Gaulle is an international French school in Ankara, Turkey. It is directly operated by the Agency for French Education Abroad (AEFE), an agency of the French government.

The school that is named after the French president Charles de Gaulle is a cosmopolitan institution that currently has over 560 students, of which 67% are Turkish nationals, 24% are French nationals, and 9% are nationals of other countries. The middle and high school institutions are located in Incek while the kindergarten is located within the French embassy compound.

== Bibliography ==
- Hervé, Jane (1996-01-01). La Turquie (in French). KARTHALA Editions. ISBN 978-2-86537-665-0.
- Dumont, Pierre (1999-10-01). LA POLITIQUE LINGUISTIQUE ET CULTURELLE DE LA FRANCE EN TURQUIE (in French). Editions L'Harmattan. ISBN 978-2-296-39577-0.
