= Lycée Français International de Dubaï =

French private international school in Dubai

Coordinates: 25.24168°N 55.31306°E

- Dubai; United Arab Emirates

Information
- Established: 2017
- Grades: KG to Grade 12
- Language: French

Lycée Français International de Dubaï or Lycée Français International de l’AFLEC is a French international school in Dubai. It serves levels maternelle until lycée. It is one of five schools operated by the Association Franco-Libanaise pour l’Éducation et la Culture (AFLEC).

It opened in 2002. As of 2016 43% of the students are French, 15% are Lebanese, and 42% are of other nationalities.

== Curriculum ==
Accredited by the French Ministry of Education and associated with the AEFE, LFJM adheres to the French National Curriculum. Multilingual instruction is a forte with Arabic, French, and English introduced

Despite many Maternelle students being non-English speakers upon joining, their English proficiency, as per DISB assessments, outperforms national French curriculum benchmarks. LFJM integrates the Cambridge curriculum to bolster English language teaching. Their students consistently display commendable achievements in both primary and college-level studies.
