= Lycée Français International d'Amman =

Information
- School type: International school
- Established: 1972
- Language: French
- Website: https://lfia.edu.jo/en/home/

The Lycée Français International d'Amman (LFIA), formerly Lycée Français d'Amman (LFA), is a French international school in Amman, Jordan. It serves levels maternelle (preschool) through lycée (senior high school).

The primary school has a main campus along Deir Ghbar. The secondary school is along Route de l’aéroport.

== History ==
The school was founded in 1972.
