= Lycée Français de Jérusalem =

International school in Jerusalem

Coordinates: 31.78426°N 35.21936°E

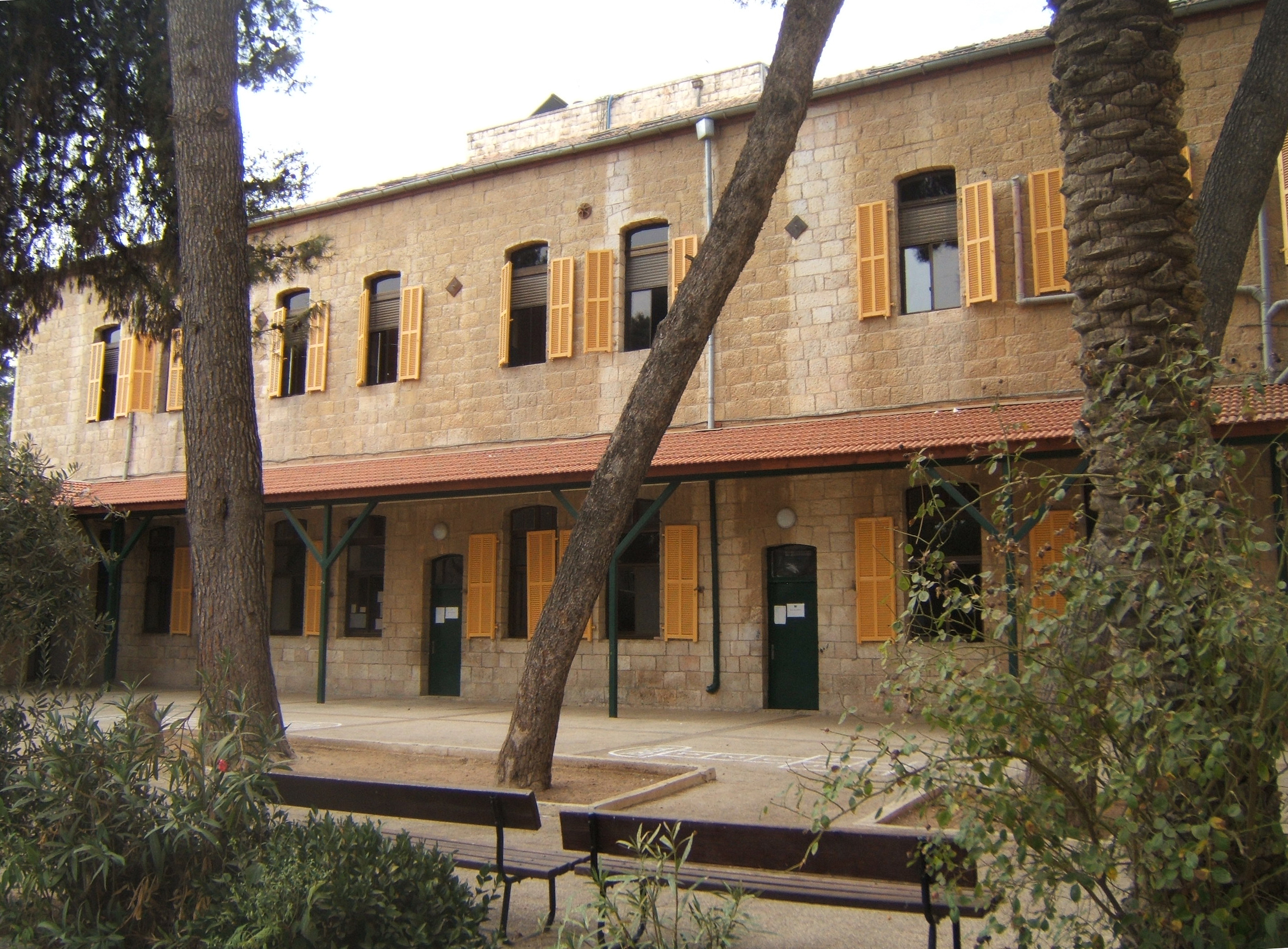
Lycée Français de Jérusalem

Lycée Français de Jérusalem (LFJ; Hebrew: בית הספר הצרפתי בירושלים, Arabic: المدرسة الفرنسية في القدس), or the Jerusalem French School, is a French international school in Jerusalem. Operating out of rented space in the Convent of St. Joseph, it serves levels maternelle (preschool) through lycée (senior high school/sixth form college).

The Petite Ecole Francaise de Jerusalem, the predecessor to the LJF, was established in 1967. It currently rents its facilities from the Congregation of the Sisters of Saint Joseph of the Apparition.

As of circa 2015 the school has 14 classes with a total of 205 students. Historically enrollment ranged from 100 to 150 students.
