= Lycée Français Liberté de Bamako =

French international school in Bamako, Mali

Coordinates: 12.6595°N 7.997°W

- Bamako; Mali

Information
- Other name: Etablissement Liberté
- School type: International School
- Language: French
- Website: https://www.libertebko.org/

Lycée Français Liberté de Bamako or the Etablissement Liberté is a French international school in Bamako, Mali. The school has a primary school, a junior high school (collège) and a senior high school (lycée). This school follows the French program defined by the French ministry of national education.
