= Collège Français de Santa Cruz de la Sierra =

French: Lycée Français de Santa Cruz de la Sierra Spanish: Colegio Frances de Santa Cruz de la Sierra

Information
- School type: International school
- Established: January 2005; 21 years ago
- Grades: maternelle - lycée
- Language: French
- Website: www.lfscz.org

Lycée Français de Santa Cruz de la Sierra (Spanish: Colegio Frances de Santa Cruz de la Sierra) is a French international school in Santa Cruz de la Sierra, Bolivia. The school includes levels maternelle (preschool) through lycée (senior high school).

The first classes began in a house in the Las Palmas neighbourhood in January 2005.
