= Lycée Franco-Nicaraguayen Victor Hugo =

Lycée Franco-Nicaraguayen
- Liceo Franco-Nicaragüense

Location
- Managua; Nicaragua
- Coordinates: 12.1250754°N 86.30964519999998°W

Information
- Type: PK-12 school
- Grades: PK-12
- Website: lvh.edu.ni

Lycée Franco-Nicaraguayen Victor Hugo (LVH, Spanish: Liceo Franco-Nicaragüense Víctor Hugo) is a French international school in eastern Managua, Nicaragua. It serves levels maternelle (preschool) through lycée (senior high school).

The school opened in 1971.

As of March 2015 there are 43 maternelle students, 93 primary school students, and 142 secondary school students, making a total of 278 students in all levels.

== See also ==
- Institut français d'Amérique centrale
