= Lycée Français Charles de Gaulle (Chile) =

Coordinates: 36.8305°S 73.0458°W

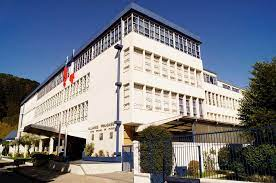

Location
- Concepción; Chile

Information
- School type: International School
- Established: 1944
- Language: French
- Website: https://cdegaulle.cl/

Lycée Français Charles de Gaulle is a French international school in Concepción, Chile. It serves primaire and secondaire levels.

It was founded in the beginning of the year 1944 by the Comité Local de la France Libre now known as the French National Committee founded by Charles de Gaulle.

The school is located at the address: Colo Colo 51, Concepción, Bío Bío, Chile
