= Lycée Franco-Hellénique Eugène Delacroix =

Lycée Franco-Hellénique Eugene Delacroix
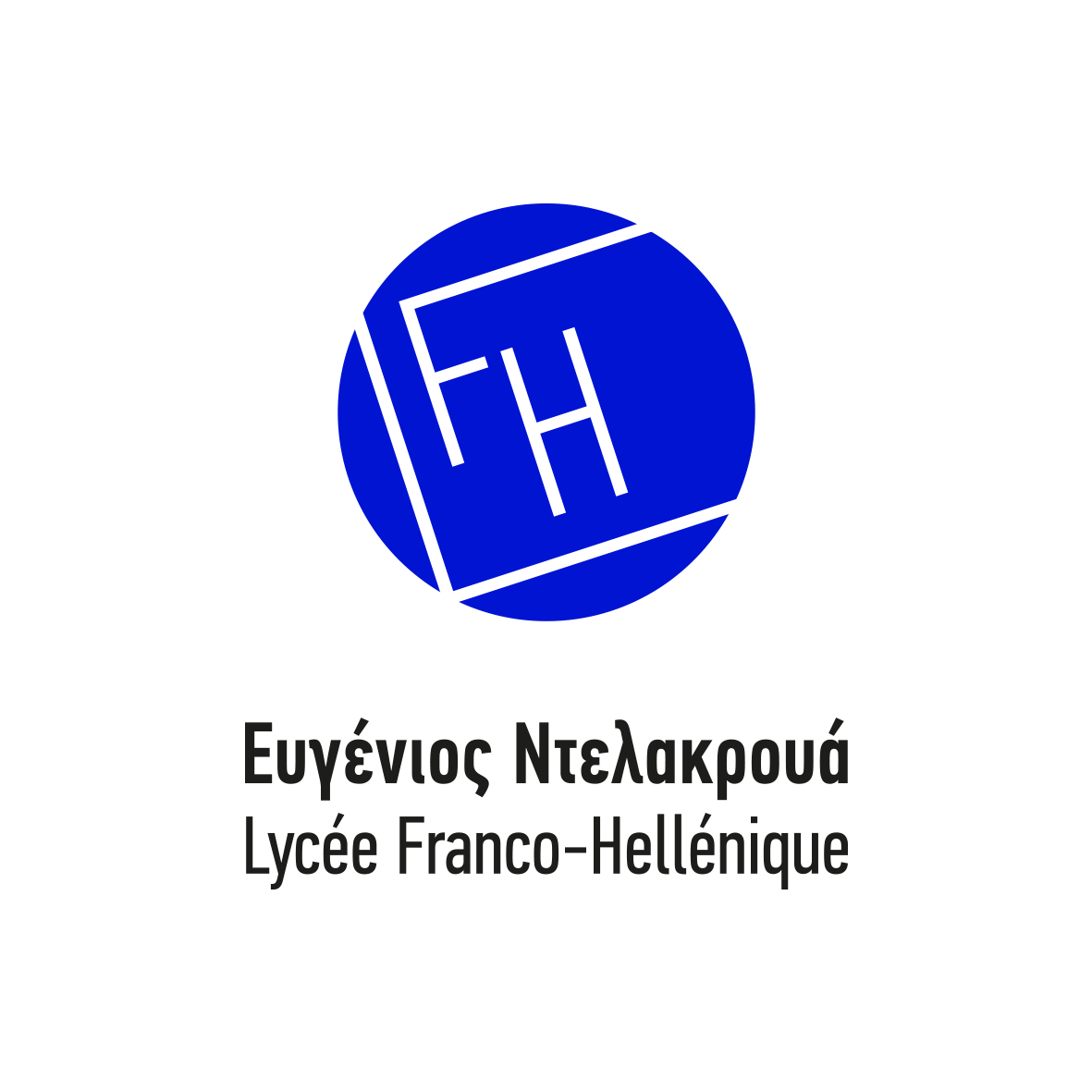

Location
- Chlois, Trikalon, Praxitelous, Drosini, Megaloxaris; Agia Paraskevi; Athens, Attica, 15342

Information
- Established: 1981; 45 years ago
- Founder: Konstantinos Karamanlis, Valéry Giscard d'Estaing
- Category: French international school
- Director: M. Miguel TESSON
- Principal: Section Hellénique Lycée: Mme. Ioanna SAVVINIDOU Collège: M. Constantin BOUBOUKIS
- Alumni: Alumni LFH
- Website: www.lfh.edu.gr

Lycée Franco-Hellénique Eugène Delacroix (LFH/LFHED Greek: Ελληνογαλλική Σχολή Ευγένιος Ντελακρουά) is a private French international school in Agia Paraskevi, Athens, Greece. It serves levels maternelle (kindergarten) until lycée (high school). The school serves as a Cambridge International School and a member of the AEFE, with students from 47 different countries.

== History ==
Lycée Franco-Hellenique was created in 1974, on the site of the small school "Collaros" that operated without statues, on the premises of the French Institute of Greece on Sina Street, thanks to the political will of the Greek President, Konstantinos Karamanlis and French President, Valéry Giscard d'Estaing. Their vision for convergence not only of the educational systems of the two countries but also of the respective cultures, was realized in 1975, after an exchange of letters between the two governments and the concession by the Greek state of a space to build the Lycée Franco-Hellénique.

For this purpose and given that a foreign state is not entitled to enter into a long-term lease (99 years), a French-Hellenic association was created, the Panhellenic Association for Education (AFHE), which brought together personalities related to the development of cultural ties between of the two countries and the strengthening of the use of French in Greece.

In 1986, the two governments signed an international agreement to establish a French-Greek school that would operate as a foreign school. The charter governing its organization was published in the Greek Government Gazette in 1988. This charter was accompanied by an agreement, according to which AFHE, Union of Greek Law, grants the management of the French-Greek School (LFH) to the Union for French Language Teaching in Greece (AEFG), a French Law Association based in Paris. Until 1990 the President of the AEFG was a representative of the Ministry of Foreign Affairs.

Since the creation of the Agency for French Education Abroad, its Director has been Chairman of the Board of the Lycée Franco-Hellénique.

In July 1990, the agreement between the French and Greek governments on LFHED was published in the French Government Gazette by Decree No. 90-541.

Subsequently, between 1993 and 1996, two contracts were signed between AEFE and AEFG, which set out the terms of reference for the staff, the training framework, the location and structure of the French and Greek departments, award procedures, grants from the French State, and staff remuneration.

In this context, the Board of Directors of the LFH Association meets once a year, in Paris or Athens, under the chairmanship of the Director of the Association.

In 2008, the Board of Directors renamed the school: Lycée Franco-Hellénique Eugène Delacroix

== Recognition and performance ==
Thanks to the conclusion of the Contract with the Service for French Education Abroad, Lycée Franco-Hellénique has joined the global network of French schools abroad, which currently has 500 schools - Gymnasiums and Lyceums - in 137 countries (350,000 students).

It is recognized as a private school by the Greek Ministry of Education and gives the students of the Greek department a chance to approach the French language and culture. The school was awarded the LabelFrancEducation quality mark by AEFE in 2015, which was renewed again.

The results of the examinations testify to the excellence of the education provided at Lycée Franco-Hellénique:

- National High School Diploma of French School: 100% success and 91.9% distinction (43%: Very Good, 27.9%: Good and 20.9%: Fairly Good).
- National High School Diploma of France: 97.5% success (34.5%: Very Good, 16.9%: Good and 30.4%: Fairly Good).
- Panhellenic Examinations: 100% of students are admitted to Greek universities and 64.4% are admitted to the universities of Athens.

== See also ==
- Institut français de Grèce (formerly Institut français d'Athènes)
