= Lycée Franco-Hondurien =

- Liceo Franco Hondureño

Location
- residencial Las Colinas boulevard Francia Apartado Postal 3743 Tegucigalpa, Francisco Morazan Honduras; Tegucigalpa; Honduras
- Coordinates: 14.0785971°N 87.190112°W

Information
- Type: K-12 school
- Established: 1966
- Grades: K-12
- Website: liceofranco.org

Lycée Franco-Hondurien (LFH; Spanish: Liceo Franco Hondureño) is a French international school in Tegucigalpa, Honduras. It serves levels maternelle (preschool) through lycée (senior high school).

It was created in 1966.

== See also ==
- Institut français d'Amérique centrale
