= École Française Internationale de Colombo =

French school in Sri Lanka

Coordinates: 6.88625°N 79.87115°E

École Française Internationale de Colombo (EFIC) is a French international school in Colombo, Sri Lanka. It opened in 1979.

It serves levels from maternelle (preschool) through lycée (senior high school). It directly teaches preschool and elementary school students and uses the National Centre for Distance Education (CNED) distance education programme with other levels.
