= Internationale Deutsche Schule Paris =

- École Allemande Internationale de Paris
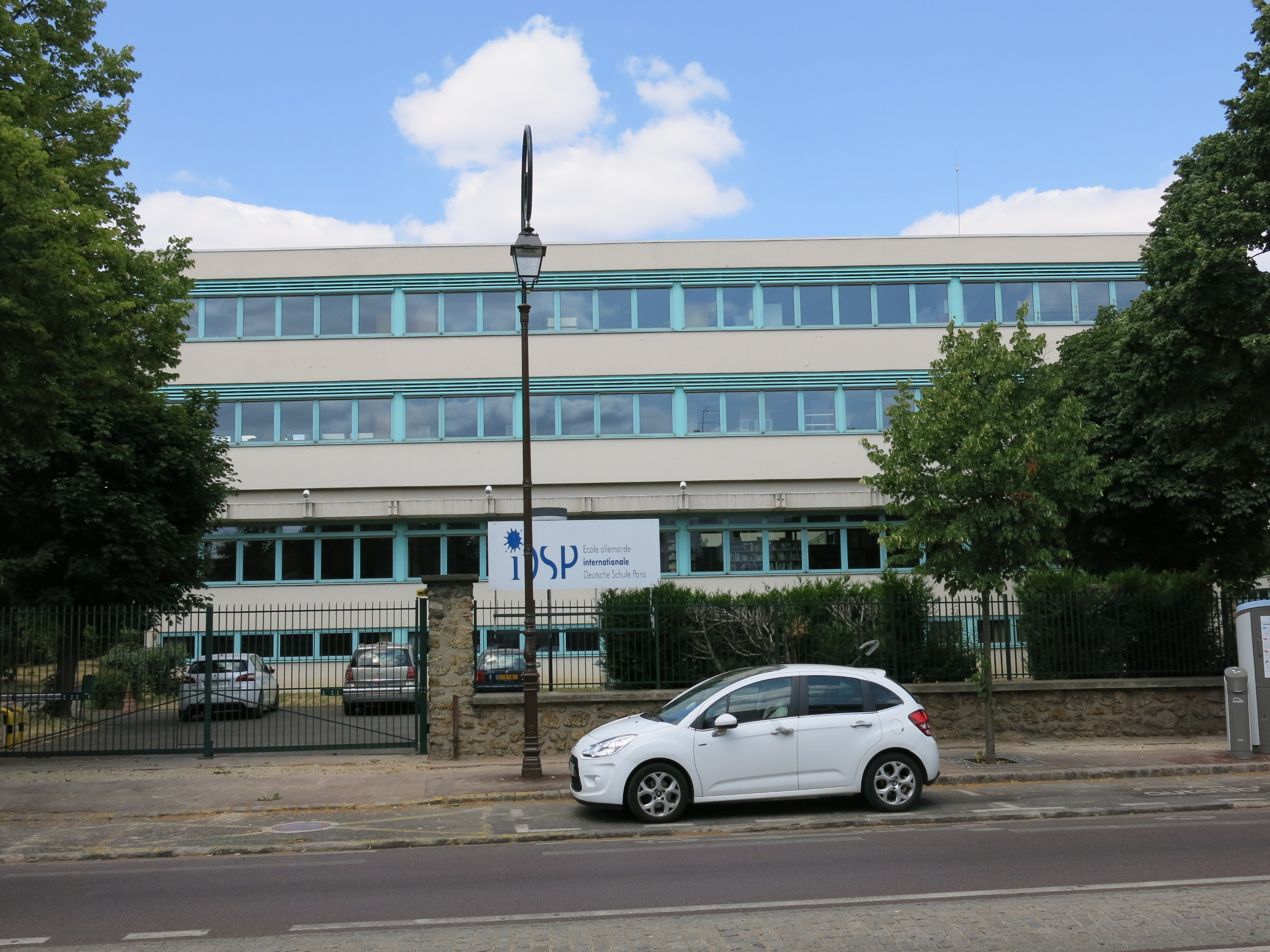
- Internationale Deutsche Schule Paris

Location
- 18 rue Pasteur F - 92210 SAINT CLOUD; Saint-Cloud; France
- Coordinates: 48.8423042°N 2.2035178999999516°E

Information
- Type: German international school
- Established: 1958
- Website: idsp.fr

Internationale Deutsche Schule Paris (iDSP; French: École Allemande Internationale de Paris) is a German international school in Saint-Cloud, France, in the Paris metropolitan area. The school serves levels kindergarten through Sekundarstufe II.

On 23 October 1958 the first stone for the school was laid. On 3 November of that year the school first opened in three YMCA-owned rooms in the 16th arrondissement of Paris, in proximity to Trocadéro. The school initially only had gymnasium classes. On 1 December 1959 the school moved into rented rooms in a villa in Neuilly-sur-Seine. The primary school opened on 1 March 1960. The primary classes were initially held in another location in the 16th arrondissement. In 1961 all levels of school moved to the current location, a villa in Saint-Cloud. The West German government had acquired the property.

== Gallery ==
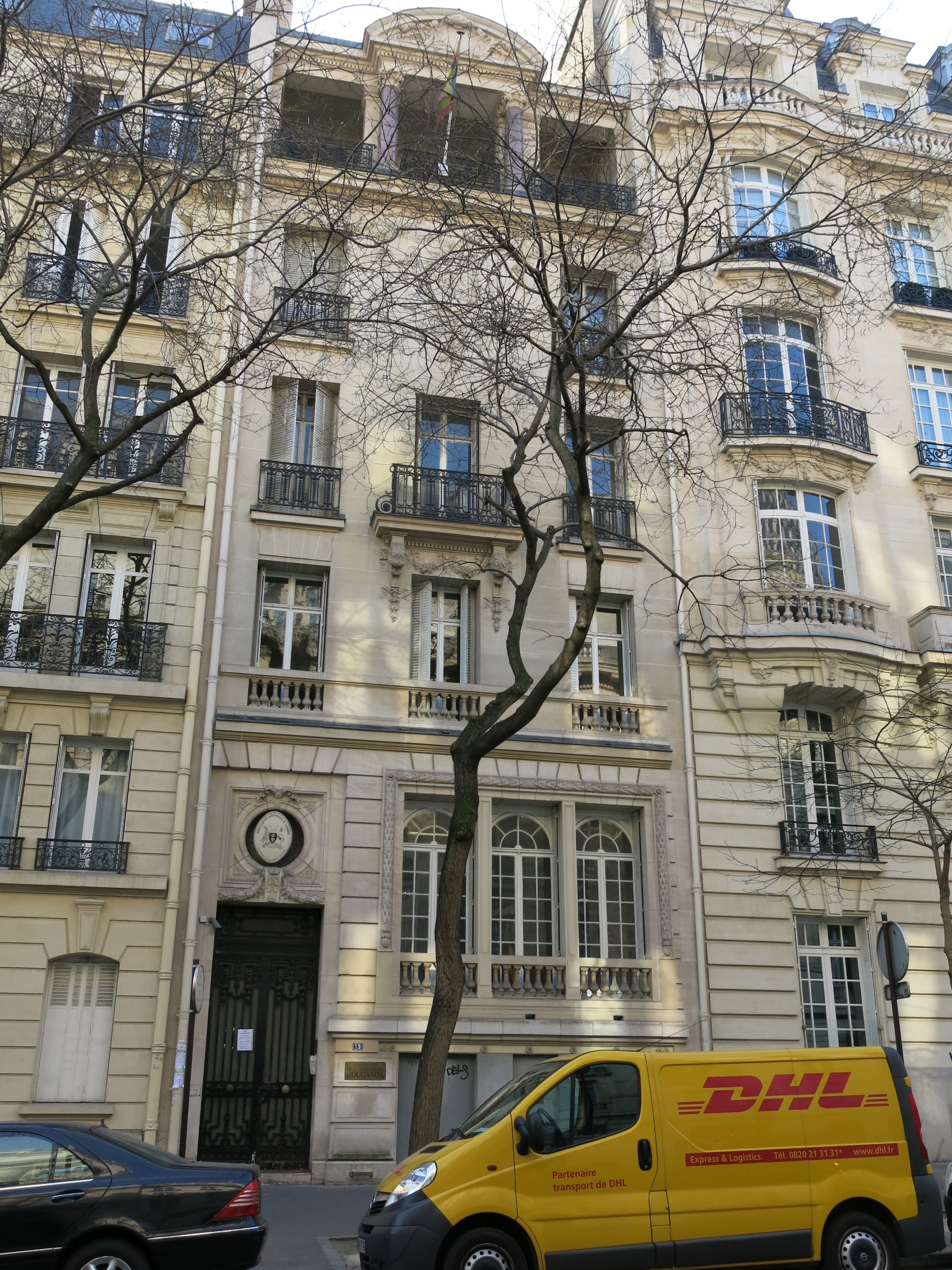
The first location of the DSP, Avenue Raymond-Poincaré, 13

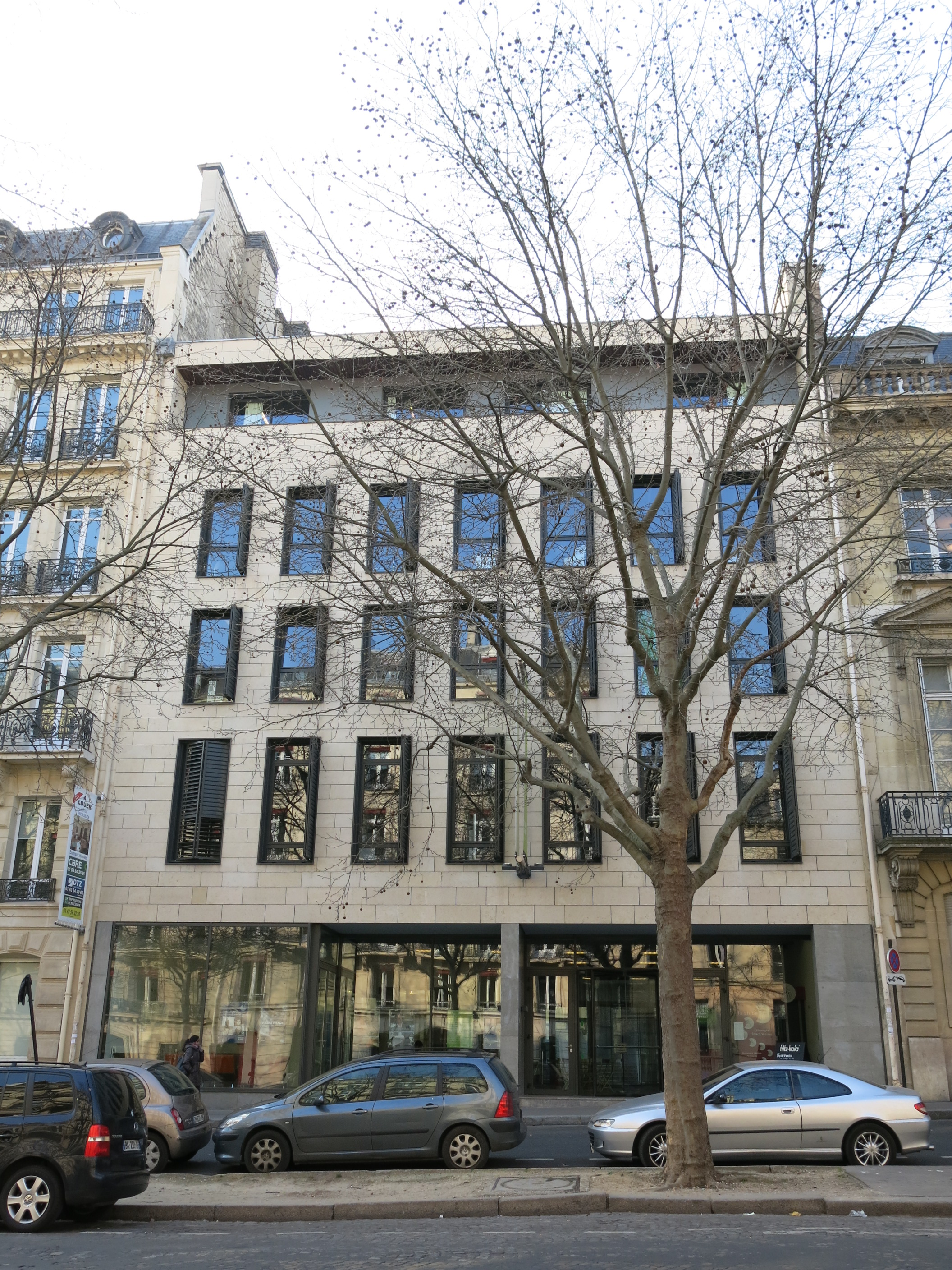
Site of the first location of primary school classes, 17, Avenue d´Iéna

== See also ==
- List including the French international schools in Germany
