= La Gazette de Berlin =

La Gazette de Berlin was a monthly French-language newspaper published and circulated in Germany from 1 June 2006 until 2009. Its editorial office was in Prenzlauer Berg, Berlin, and it was distributed and sold in several cities all over Germany. Its target audience was the French-speaking community in Germany. Only one page of the paper was written in German. It was published by Régis Présent-Griot.

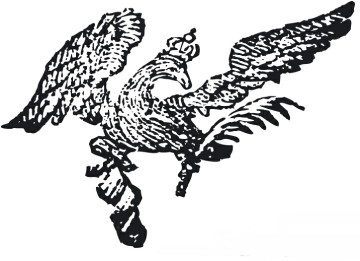
Masthead of the Gazette de Berlin (1743)

The newspaper's name and masthead (a crowned eagle holding a sheet of paper and a pen) were borrowed from the original La Gazette de Berlin, founded in 1743.
