= Mission laïque française =

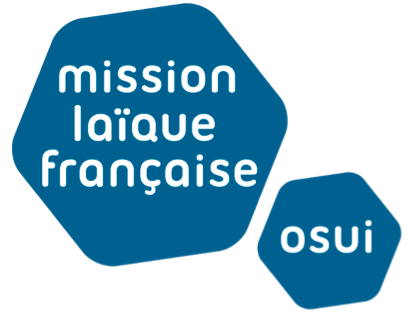
- Founded: 1902; 124 years ago
- Founder: Pierre Deschamps
- Purpose: "Two cultures, three languages."
- Location: Paris, France
- Region served: worldwide

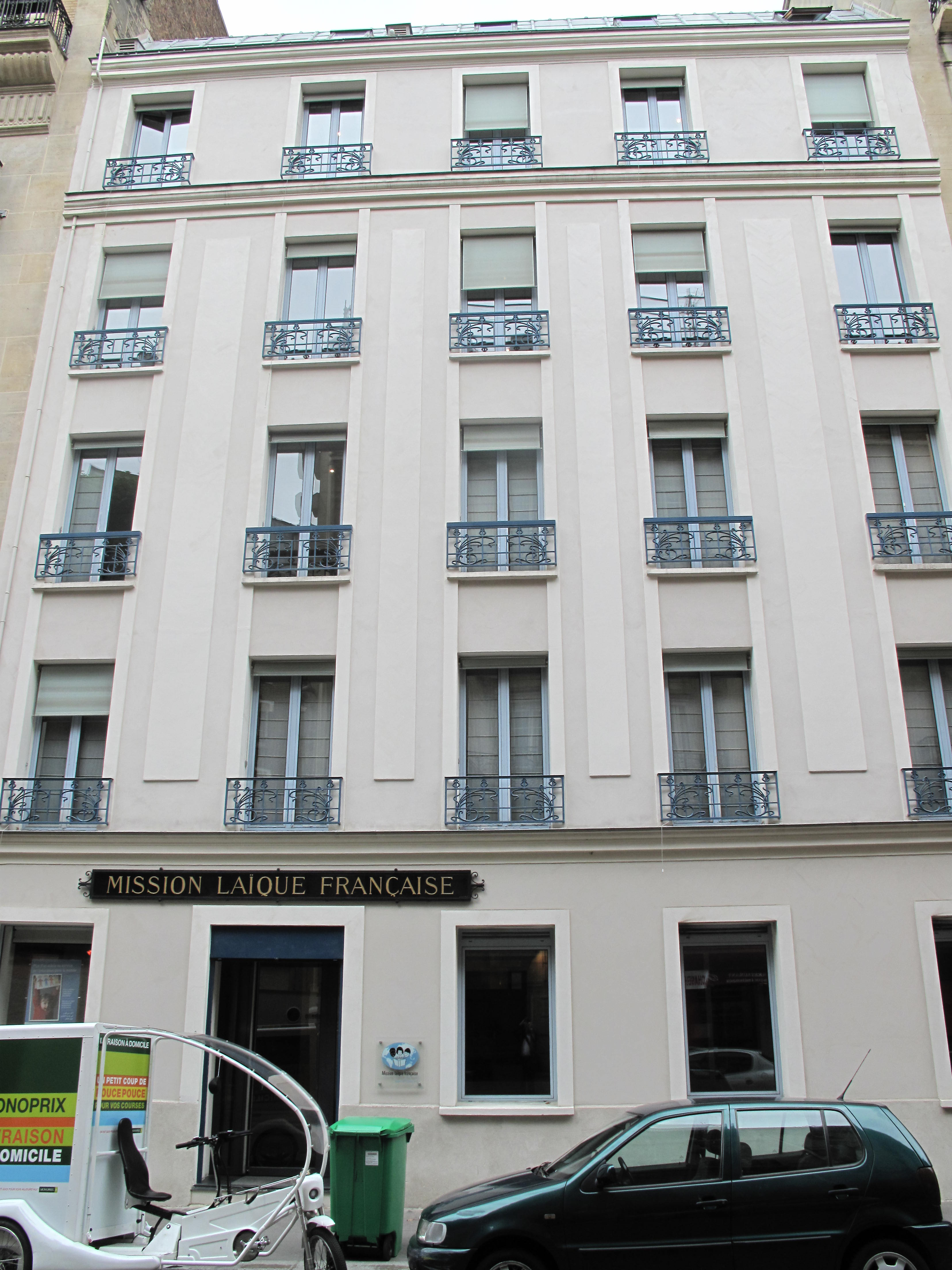
Head office in Paris, rue Humblot

The Mission laïque française (French pronunciation: [misjɔ̃ la.ik fʁɑ̃sɛːz]; MLF; "French lay/secular mission") is a non-profit organisation founded in 1902 by Pierre Deschamps. This organisation works to spread the French language and culture by creating and running schools outside France. Its head office is in the 15th arrondissement of Paris.

== School network ==
By the end of 2016, the MLF was running schools in 47 different countries: Afghanistan, Algeria, Angola, Armenia, Azerbaijan, Bahrain, Bosnia and Herzegovina, Brazil, Bulgaria, Cameroon, Canada, China, Democratic Republic of the Congo, Egypt, Equatorial Guinea, Ethiopia, Finland, Gabon, Greece, Haiti, India, Indonesia, Iran, Iraqi Kurdistan, Italy, Ivory Coast, Kazakhstan, Lebanon, Libya, Morocco, Nigeria, Norway, Palestine, Romania, Russia, Saudi Arabia, Senegal, South Korea, Spain, Syria, Turkmenistan, the United Arab Emirates, the United Kingdom, the United States, Uzbekistan, Venezuela, and Yemen.

The 108 schools are divided into two networks: traditional schools and schools in joint ventures with big French companies such as Total S.A., Areva, Airbus and Bouygues.

== Financial pressures and asset sales ==
In November 2025, the French government said that MLF's nine-school Spanish network had accumulated losses of €18.2 million over ten years and was running an estimated annual deficit of €2.5 million. It also reported that enrolment had fallen by about 630 pupils in two years despite a 19% increase in tuition fees. MLF cited those financial pressures when it announced that it would withdraw from direct management of the network. In July 2026, the minister responsible for French citizens abroad said that a published audit had identified structural dysfunctions which led MLF to sell the network.

=== Spain ===
MLF announced its withdrawal from the nine schools on 16 October 2025. The government said that it had not been informed sufficiently early and urged consultation with families, staff and elected representatives. MLF committed to maintaining accreditation and educational continuity and to retaining staff. In May 2026, an extraordinary general meeting selected the non-profit Association franco-libanaise pour l'éducation et la culture and Groupe des Établissements Elite (AFLEC-GEE) to take over the entire Spanish network, with a ten-year partnership intended to maintain educational links with MLF.

The transaction was scrutinized in the French Senate. Senator Mathilde Ollivier said that AFLEC was already described by MLF as a sister association within its network, that the real-estate component was valued at €17 million, and that public support and the valuation of the properties warranted greater transparency and independent oversight. The government replied that MLF is a private association in which the state has only a consultative role, while saying it was monitoring whether MLF fulfilled its commitments.

=== Dallas International School campus dispute ===
MLF owns the Churchill campus occupied by Dallas International School (DIS). In an August 2026 parliamentary question, French senator Ronan Le Gleut said that the campus had been acquired to house the school and that it served part of a school community of nearly 700 pupils from more than 50 nationalities. According to Le Gleut, MLF's board approved in principle a $10.25 million sale to DIS on 1 July 2026, but MLF declined to proceed on 21 July and initially sought possession when the lease expired on 31 October. He described the dispute as a threat to continuity of French-language education in Dallas and asked the government to help broker either a sale or a sufficient lease extension; the French ambassador to the United States and the consul general in Houston had already intervened with the parties.

MLF came under significant scrutiny over its handling of the proposed sale of the Churchill campus. After previously pursuing a sale to Dallas International School (DIS), MLF abruptly shifted toward an unidentified third-party buyer, a reversal that threatened DIS's continued occupancy and raised concerns that the change would materially harm the school. MLF stated that a 2023 disagreement over governance had altered its relationship with DIS and that outstanding invoices, which had been expected to be resolved through the proposed sale to the school, remained unpaid.

On 24 August, MLF announced that it intended to sell the property to an unidentified third party and informed DIS that it would have only weeks to vacate, with no extension of its lease. The decision created the prospect of displacing hundreds of students during the academic year and intensified political and community pressure on MLF.

Following that pressure, MLF proposed a rent-neutral extension through 4 June 2027, but conditioned the extension on non-disparagement by every parent with a child enrolled at the school. The breadth of that condition drew particular criticism because continued access to the campus would effectively depend on restricting criticism from the entire parent community. The sequence of events — abandoning the proposed sale to DIS, threatening near-term displacement, and then attaching a sweeping non-disparagement condition to an extension — intensified concerns that MLF was prioritizing its property transaction and institutional dispute with DIS over educational continuity and the interests of hundreds of students.
