= International French School of Turin =

Coordinates: 45.0807°N 7.7311°E

- French: Lycée Français Jean Giono Turin
- Turin; Italy

Information
- Established: 1971; 55 years ago
- Grades: Preschool - Year 13
- Language: French
- Website: https://gionoturin.it/

The International French School of Turin (French: Lycée Français Jean Giono Turin) is a French international school in Turin, Italy. It serves all classes from preschool through upper secondary school to year 13.

== History ==
The primary school classes were established in 1971 on Via Morosini in Crocetta, Turin. Year 6 classes began in 1974.

== Campus ==
The current campus has hosted the school since 2009. In 2017, the Ministry of Europe and Foreign Affairs bought the campus for the school at an estimated price of 2.5 million euros. The school is on a hillside and has two thousand square meters of interior space and five thousand square meters of exterior space. The institutes large hillside domain is considered to be one of the school's major assets.

== See also ==
- The Lycée Stendhal de Milan - The French school in Milan
- The Lycée Victor Hugo - The French school in Florence
- The Lycée français Chateaubriand - A French School in Rome
- The Institut Saint Dominique - A French School in Rome
- Istituto Statale Italiano Leonardo Da Vinci - The Italian school in Paris
