= Giovanni Rucellai =

Giovanni Rucellai may refer to:

- Giovanni di Paolo Rucellai (1403–1481), Renaissance writer and patron of the arts
- Giovanni di Bernardo Rucellai (1475–1525), his grandson, Renaissance writer and humanist

== See also ==
- Bernardo Rucellai (1448/49–1514), son of Giovanni di Paolo Rucellai and father of Giovanni di Bernardo Rucellai
