= Piazza de' Rucellai =

Piazza from Florence

Coordinates: 43°46′17.3″N 11°14′59.3″E

The Piazza de' Rucellai is a piazza in Florence, Italy, home to the Palazzo Rucellai designed by Leon Battista Alberti and its loggia. It is a small triangular square.
