= Platonic Academy (Florence) =

Informal discussion group in Renaissance Florence

The Platonic Academy of Florence (Italian: Accademia Platonica di Firenze) was an informal discussion group which formed around Marsilio Ficino in the Florentine Renaissance of the fifteenth century.

== History ==
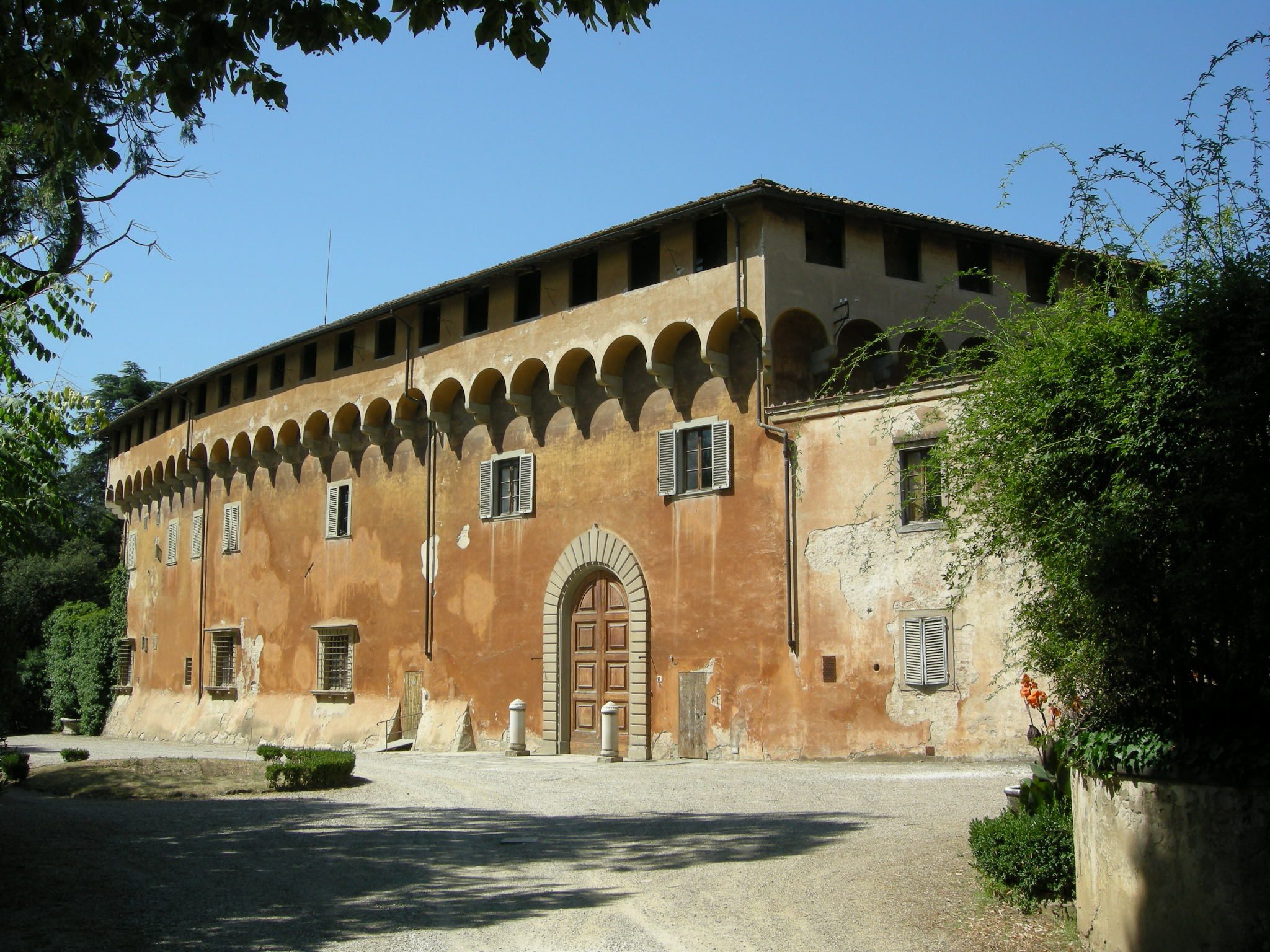
Villa di Careggi, where the group may have met

In about 1462 Cosimo de' Medici established the young Marsilio Ficino at Montevecchio, a villa close to his own Villa di Careggi in the Florentine countryside. There Ficino, who was an ardent Neo-Platonist, was to study ancient Greek and work on translating the works of Plato into Latin.

Cosimo de' Medici attended Gemistos Plethon's lectures and was motivated to establish the Accademia Platonica in Florence, where Italian students of Plethon continued their teachings following the conclusion of the council.

Ficino became the central figure of an informal group of people interested in his work, who both corresponded and met for intellectual discussions at Montevecchio, at Careggi, or perhaps in Florence itself. It was never a formal body – it had no statutes and kept no records of membership – and there is no contemporary evidence that it was ever known as a "Platonic Academy". Arnaldo della Torre identified about a hundred people as participants in the group, among them Alessandro Braccesi, Demetrius Chalcondylas, Cristoforo Landino, Angelo Poliziano, Giovanni Pico della Mirandola and Lorenzo de' Medici. Among those who Ficino specifically stated had never been among his auditores ('listeners') are Benedetto Accolti, Leon Battista Alberti, Demetrius Chalcondylas, Cristoforo Landino, Poliziano, Pierleone da Spoleto and Pico della Mirandola.

According to some accounts, the group continued to meet after the death of Ficino in 1499, centred round Francesco Cattani da Diacceto. Meetings were no longer at Careggi but in the Orti Oricellari, the gardens of the Palazzo Rucellai, made available by Bernardo Rucellai. The group was dissolved in 1522 in the aftermath of the plot to assassinate Giulio de' Medici. Other accounts give an earlier date of 1492–1494 for the dissolution of the group, suggesting that the meetings in the Orti Oricellari were not directly connected, although many of the same people participated in them.
