= Istituto Statale Italiano Leonardo Da Vinci =

- Lycée italien Leonardo da Vinci
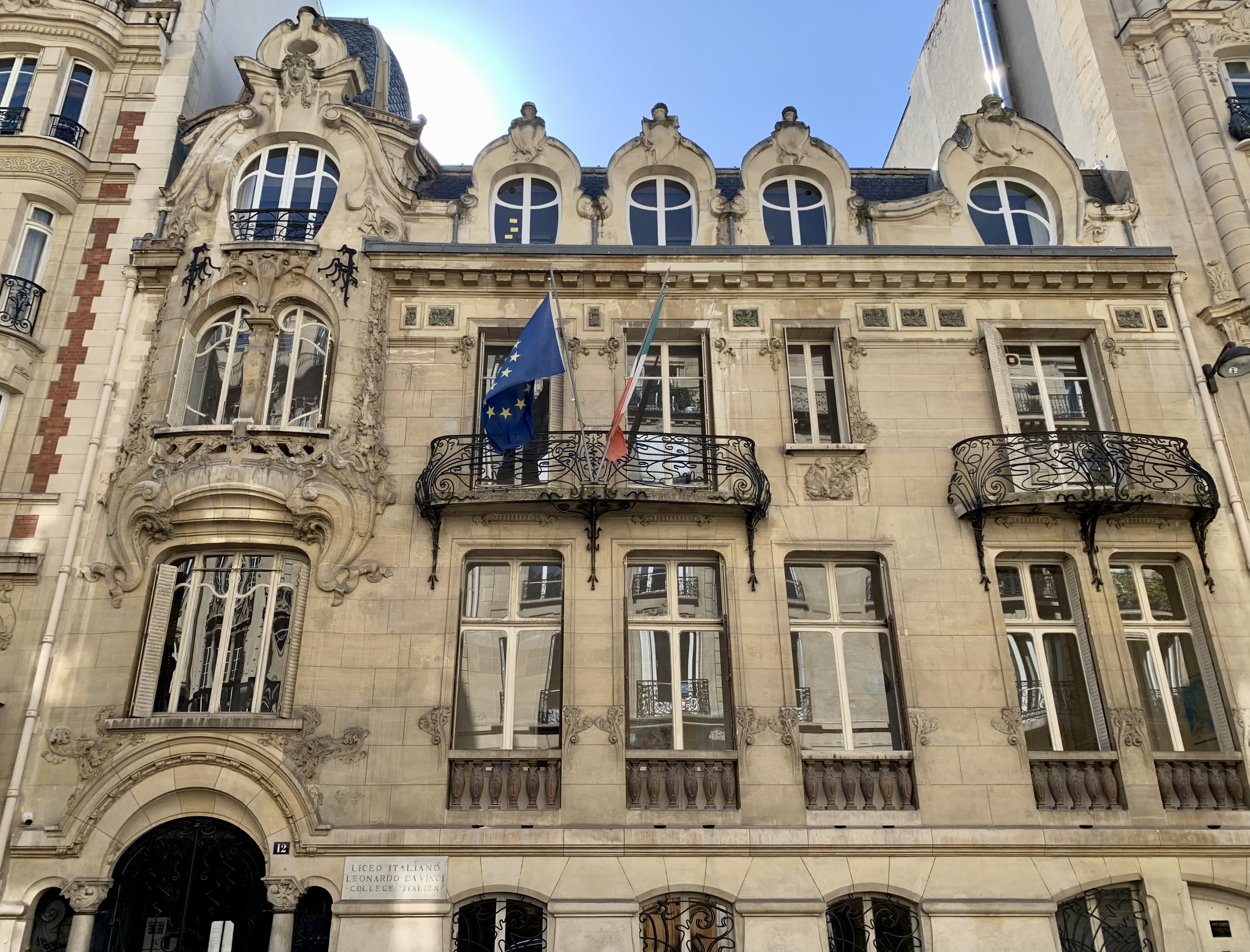
- Junior and senior high school and administration

Location
- HQ/Secondary: 12 rue Sédillot - 75007 Parigi; Elementary: 3 bis Avenue de Villars - 75007 Parigi; Paris; France
- Coordinates: 48.8586°N 2.3015°E

Information
- Type: Primary & secondary school
- Grades: K-12
- Website: scuolaitaparigi.esteri.it

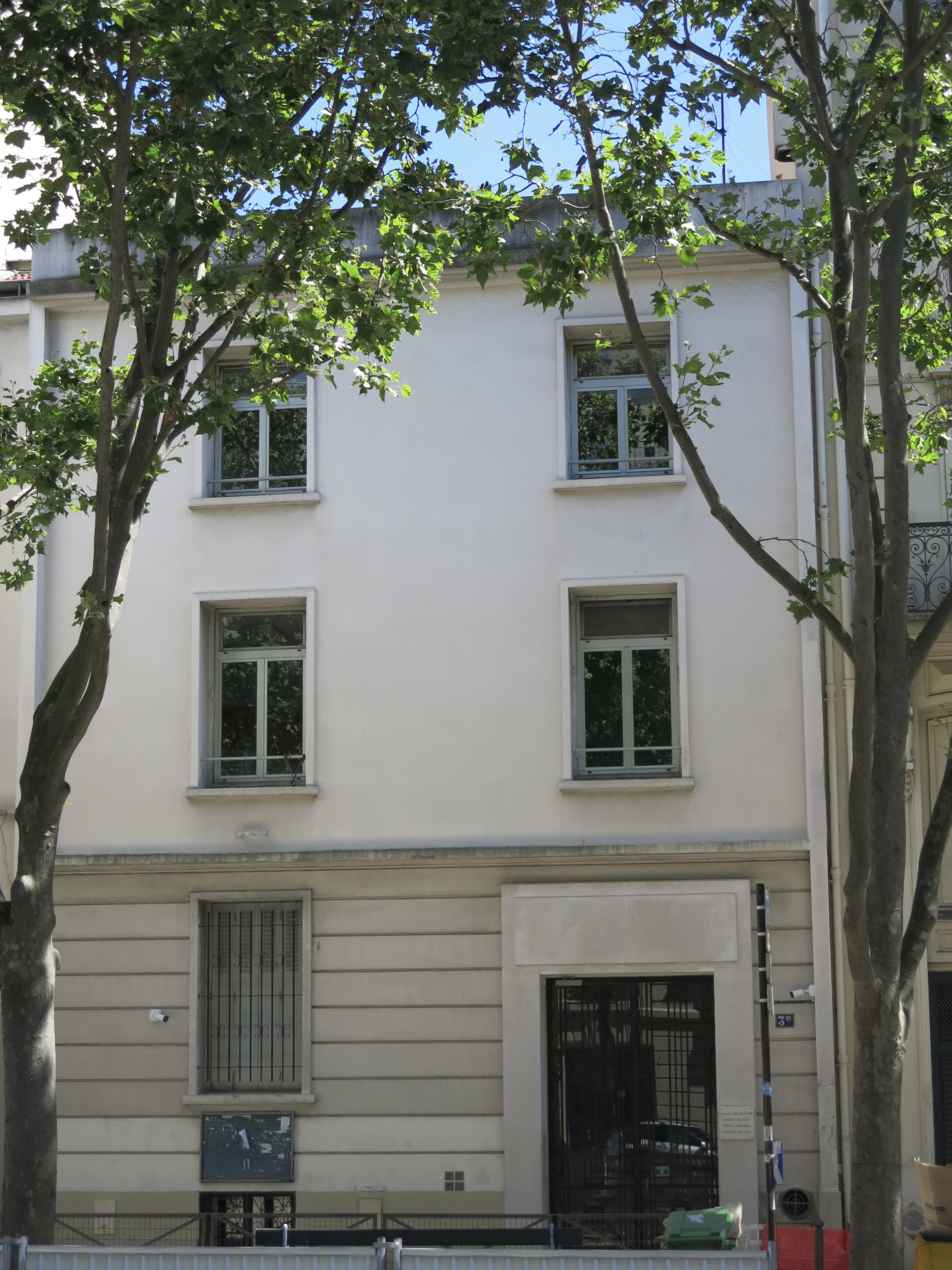
Elementary school and preschool building

The Istituto Statale Italiano Leonardo Da Vinci (French: Lycée italien Leonardo da Vinci) is an Italian government-owned Italian international school in Paris, France. Its scuola media and liceo scientifico (junior and senior high school, or high school and sixth-form college), along with the school administration, occupies one campus in the 7th arrondissement. The elementary school is housed in a different campus in the same arrondissement.

The Lycée français Chateaubriand, the French school of Rome, is considered to be its sister school. This was established by the Convention Culturelle italo francese of 4 November 1949.

== History ==
In 1932 Paris's first Italian school opened on Rue Bixio, and it moved to Avenue de Friedland in 1934. The school had a main campus on Rue de la Faisanderie and a Vincennes branch by 1937, and by 1939 each campus had 300 students, the maximum capacity for each. World War II, however, disrupted the Italian school.

It moved to the 12 rue Sédillot location in the 1949-1950 school year. The primary school campus at Avenue de Villars opened in 1961.

== Campuses ==
12 rue Sédillot, an Art Nouveau building, was designed by Jules Lavirotte. It was first built in 1899. On May 6, 1930 the Italian Government bought the building. Before it became the Italian school, it was used as a "House of Italy". The fascists had used it for several years, before the French Provisional Government took possession in the post-World War II period. The French gave the building back to the Italians, and it opened as the Italian school on November 5, 1949.

Miriam F. Stimpson, author of A Field Guide to Landmarks of Modern Architecture in Europe, described 12 rue Sédillot as "One of Lavirotte's most flamboyant works in the Art Nouveau style."

Campuses

== See also ==
French international schools in Italy:

- Lycée français Chateaubriand
- Lycée Stendhal de Milan
- Lycée Victor Hugo
- International French School of Turin
