= Palazzo Venturi, Florence =

Palace in Florence, Italy

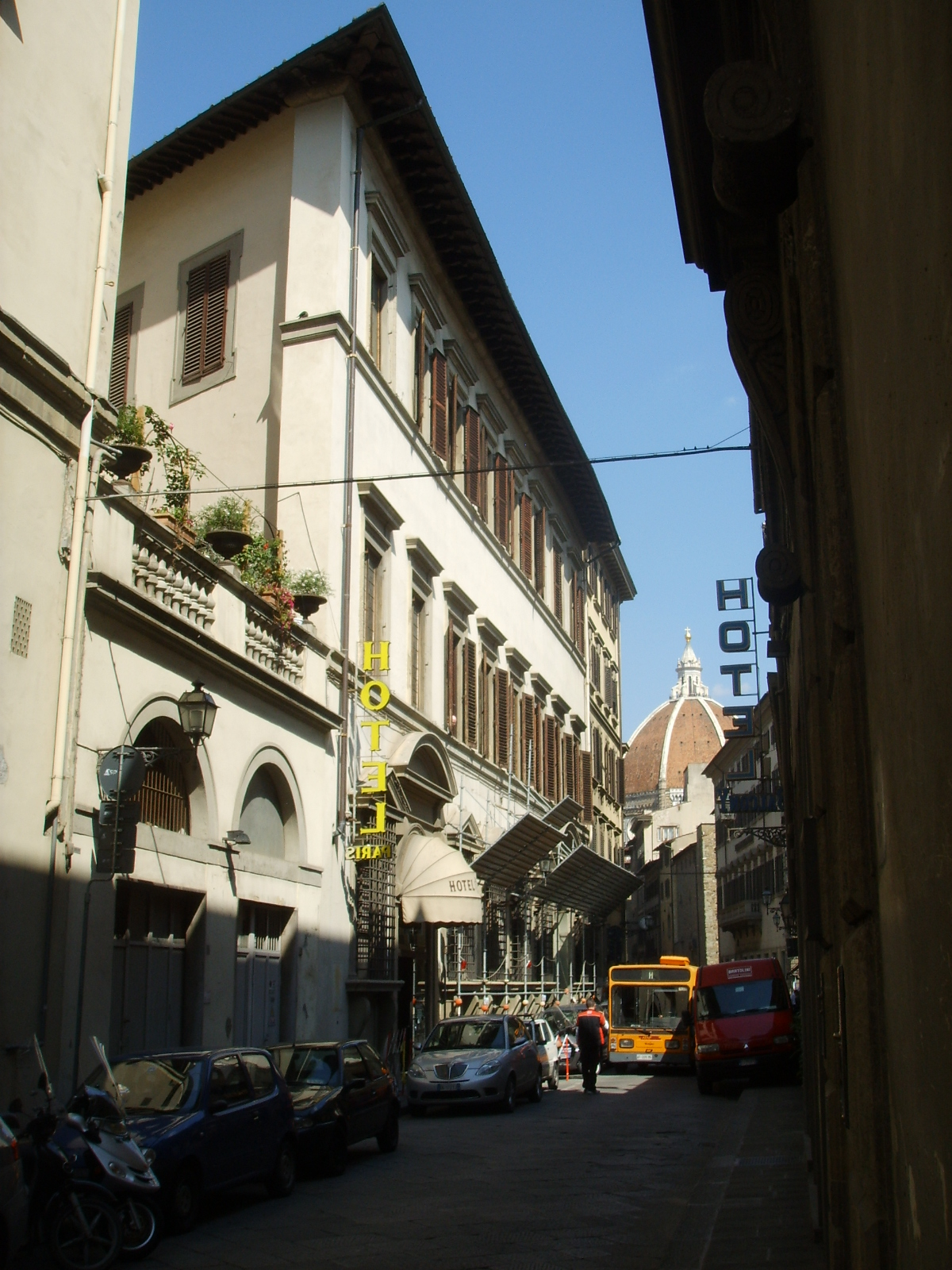
Facade of Palace

The Palazzo Venturi, once known as Palazzo Doni is a Renaissance-style palace located in central Florence, region of Tuscany, Italy. It located on via de' Banchi 2. The palace differs from the Palazzo Venturi Ginori on Via della Scala.

== History ==
The site was once the home of some houses belonging to the Bischeri family. In 1599, the Doni Family, who had acquired the site, commissioned the present structure from either Bernardo Buontalenti or Gherardo Silvani. The palace was inherited by the Bourbon del Monte, who sold it in 1667 to Cosimo Venturi, whose family also owned also the nearby palace on via de' Banchi 4. The Venturi family commissioned much of the interior decoration. The palace remained with the Venturi family until 1850, when it was sold to prince Ercole dei Pio of the Savoy Family. The palace is presently occupied by an inn.

The entrance to the palace still houses the heraldic shield of the Venturi, with three golden rocks on a blue background below the sign of the Anjou. The first floor has ceilings frescoed with grotteschi by Bernardino Poccetti.

== Gallery ==
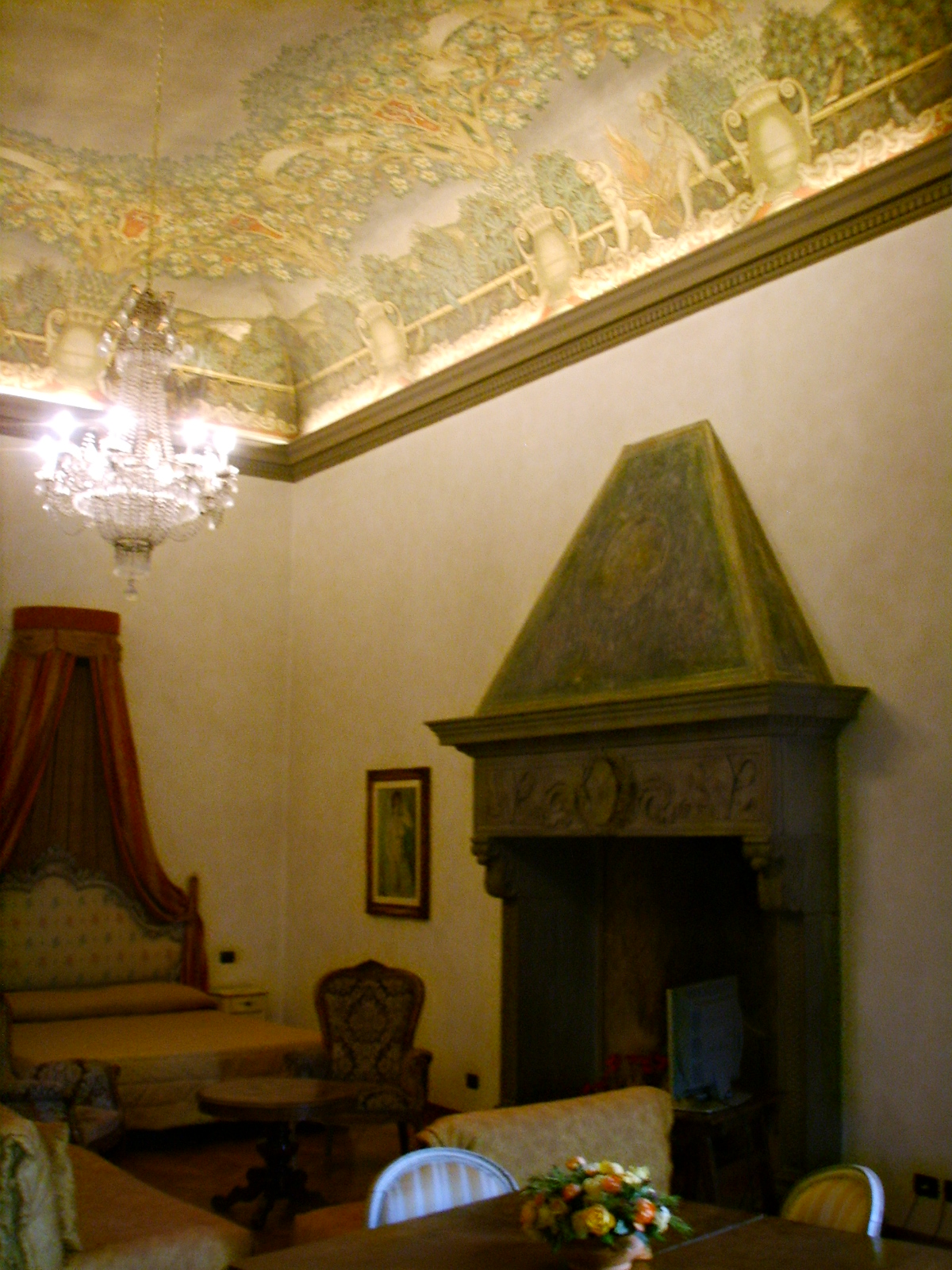
Sala (hall) del Camino

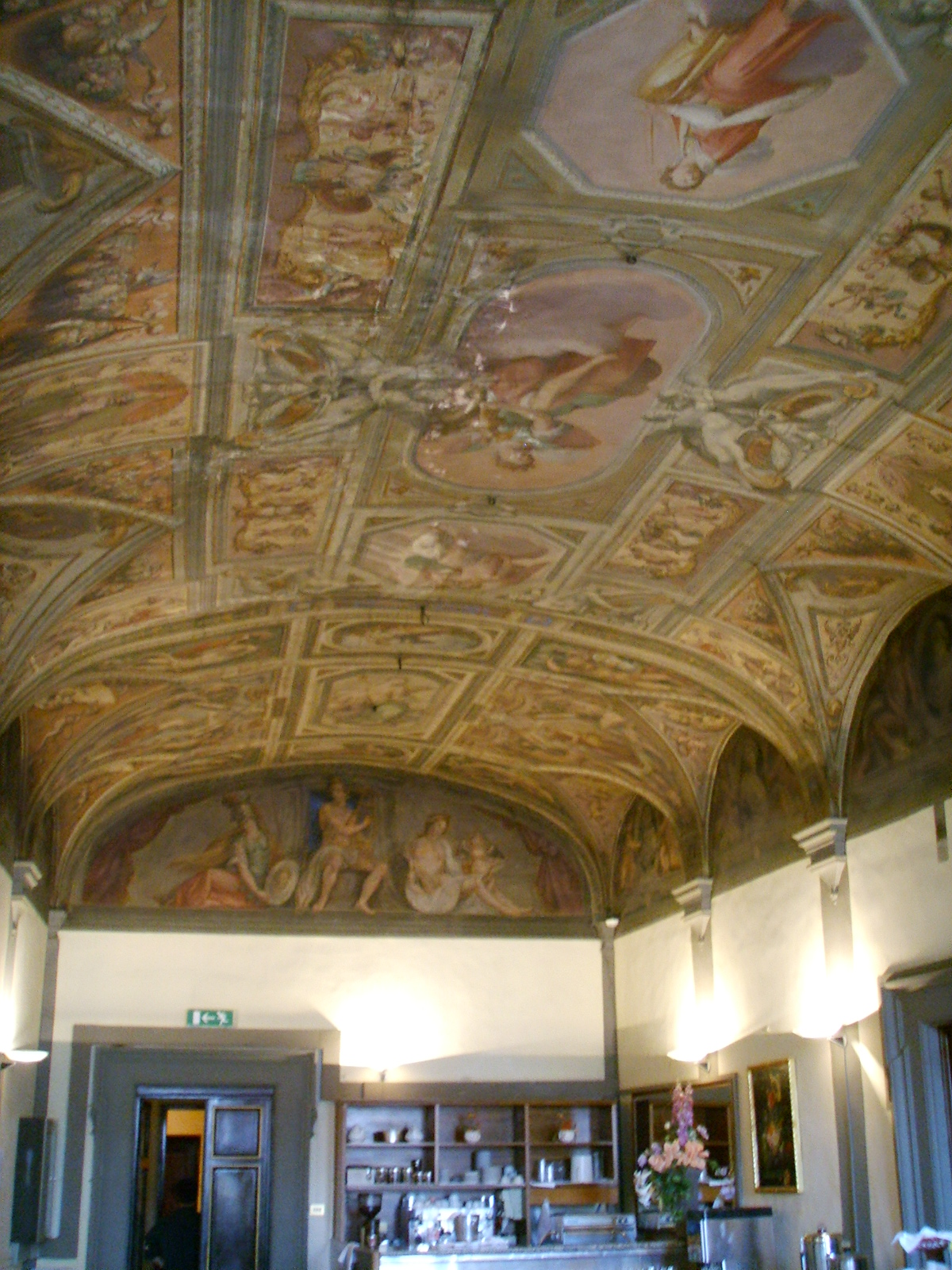
Sala delle grottesche

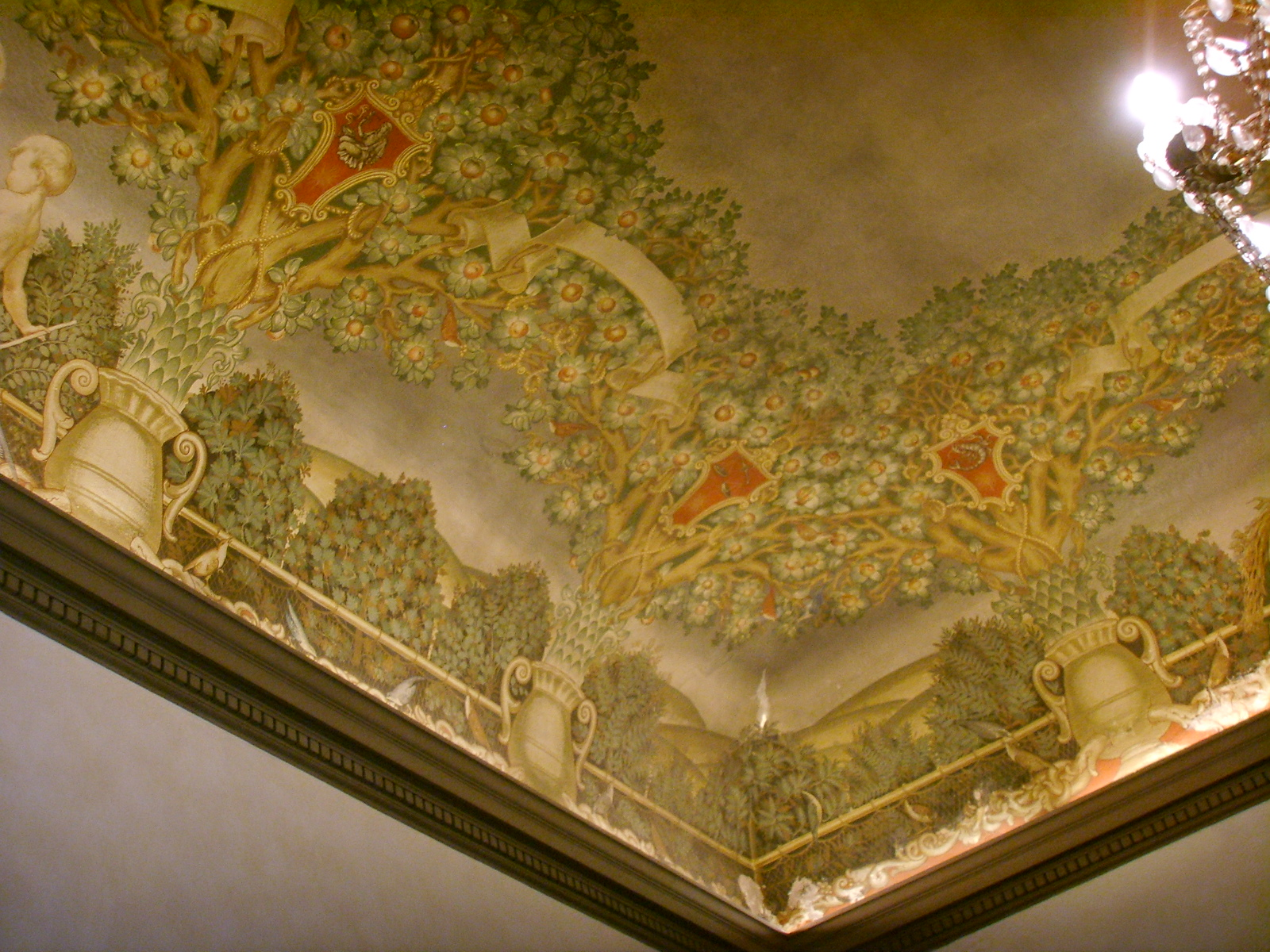
Sala del Camino, frescoes depicting the seasons and zodiac signs

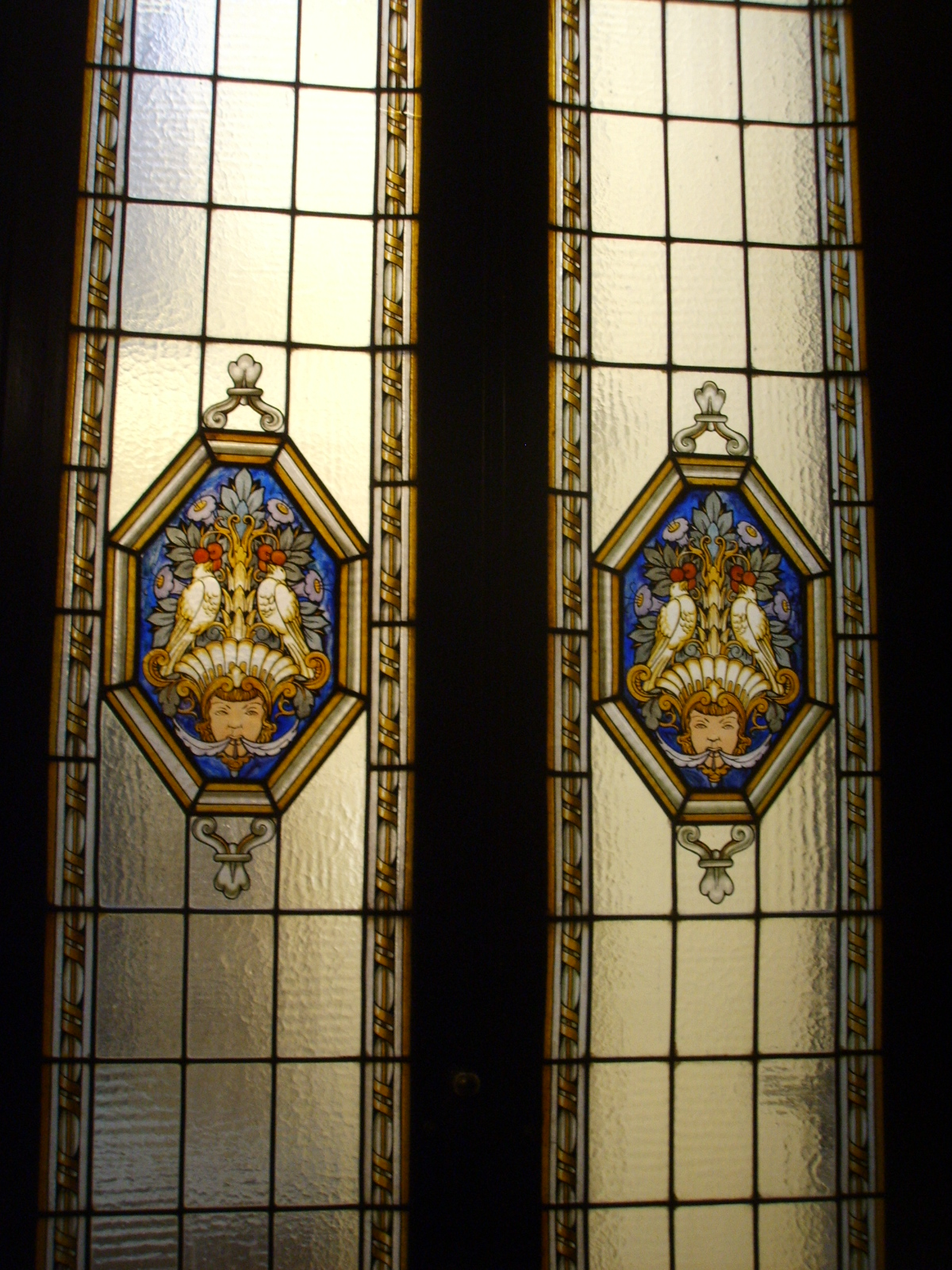
Painted windows

== Bibliography ==
- Marcello Vannucci, Splendidi palazzi di Firenze, Le Lettere, Firenze 1995.
- Sandra Carlini, Lara Mercanti, Giovanni Straffi, I Palazzi parte seconda. Arte e storia degli edifici civili di Firenze, Alinea, Firenze 2004.
