= Lycée Chateaubriand =

Lycée Chateaubriand may refer to:

- Lycée français Chateaubriand, a French international school in Rome, Italy
- Lycée Chateaubriand (Rennes), France
