= Loggia Rucellai =

Loggia in Florence, Italy

Coordinates: 43°46′16.04″N 11°14′59.36″E

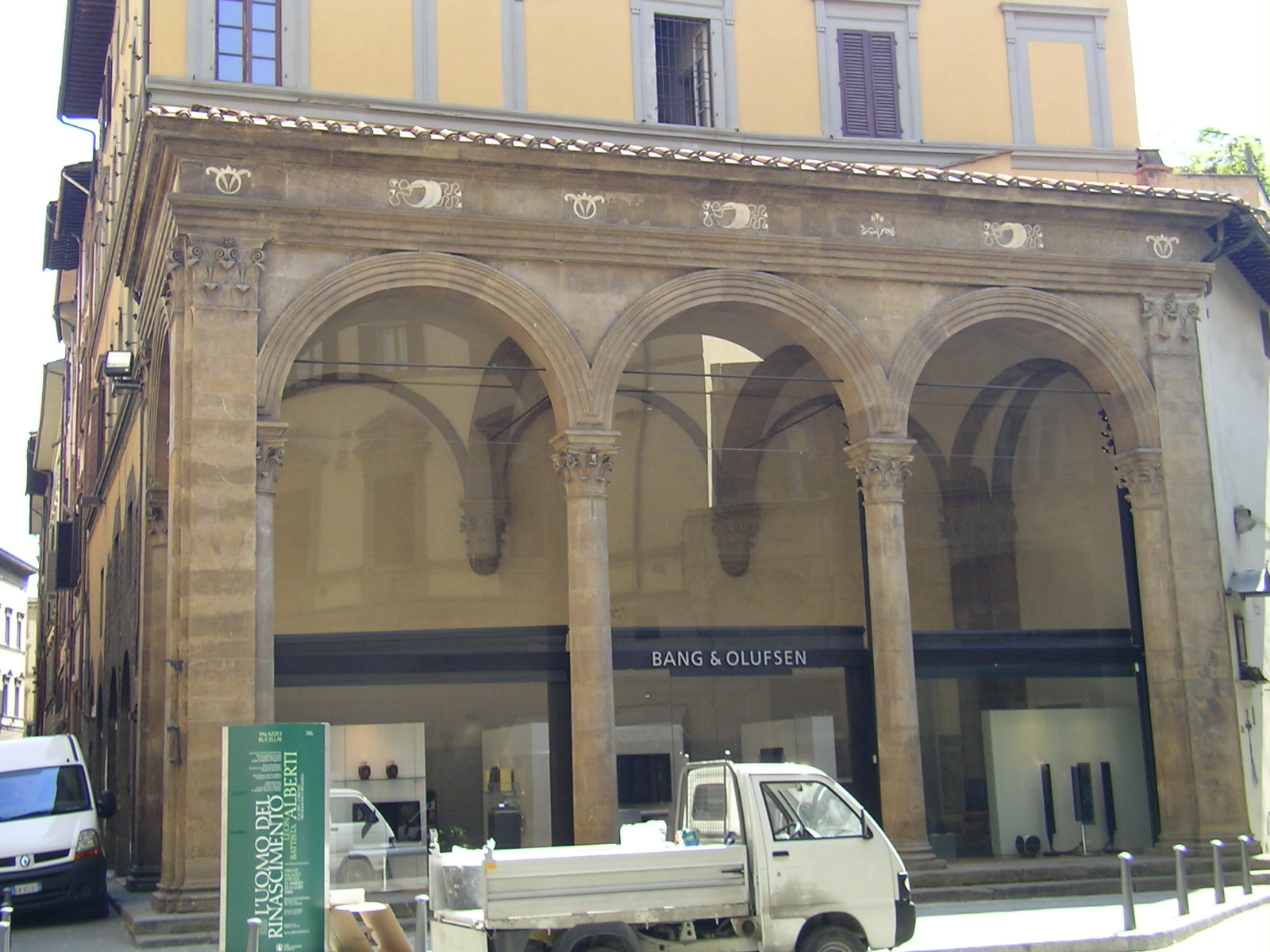
- The Loggia Rucellai in 2006
- Interactive map of the Loggia Rucellai area
- Alternative names: Loggia dei Rucellai

General information
- Location: Florence, Italy
- Completed: 1466

The Loggia Rucellai is an Italian Renaissance loggia in Florence, Italy. It stands opposite Palazzo Rucellai in the Via della Vigna Nuova, and faces onto Piazza de' Rucellai. It was built by Giovanni di Paolo Rucellai in the 1460s; it may have been designed by Leon Battista Alberti, but this attribution is disputed. Originally intended as a place for the Rucellai family to have weddings and other celebrations, it is now glazed and used as a shop.

== History ==
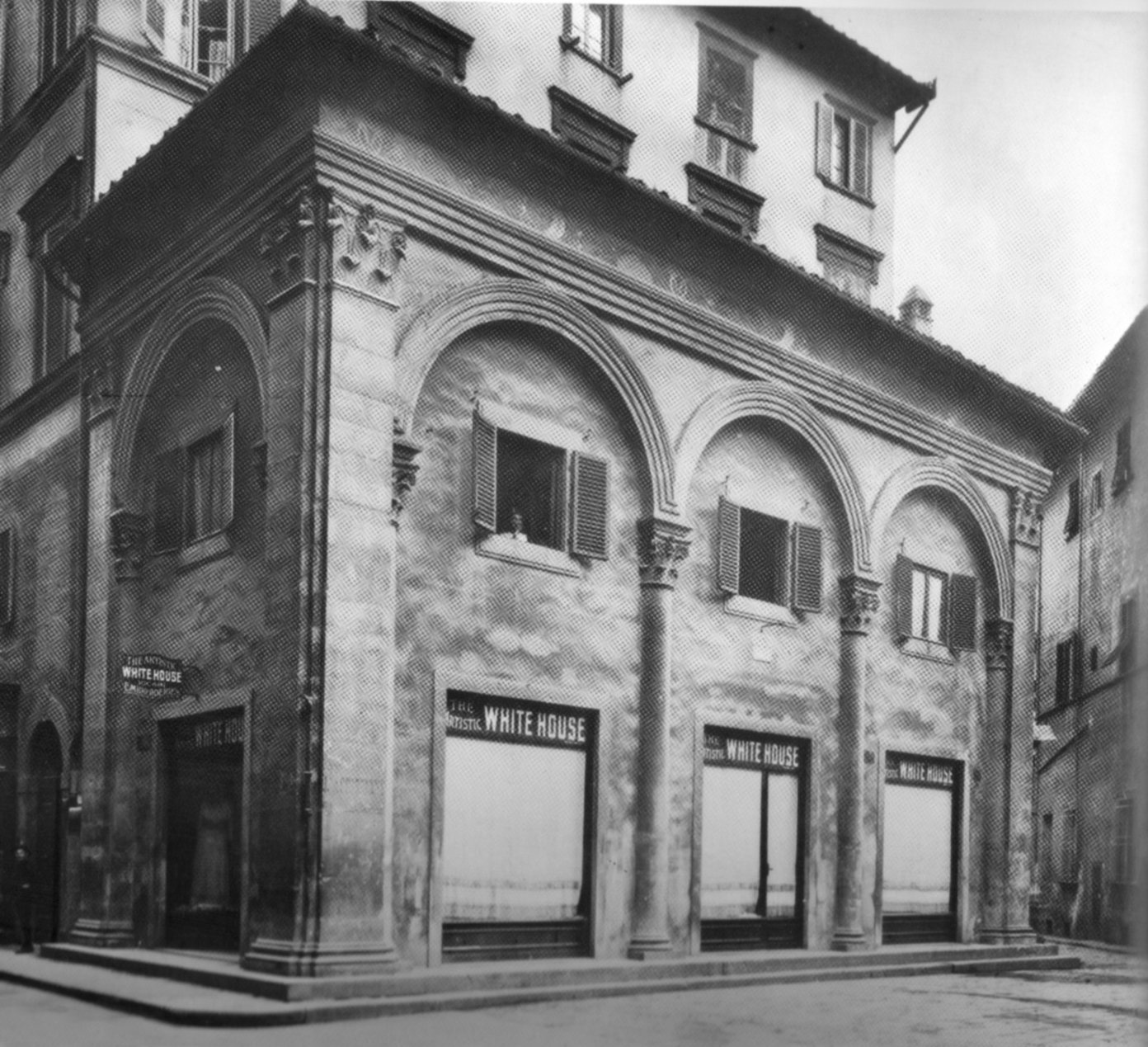
The Loggia Rucellai in 1880

The loggia was completed before 8 June 1466, the date of the wedding-feast of Giovanni's son Bernardo Rucellai and Nannina de' Medici, the daughter of Piero di Cosimo de' Medici and elder sister to Lorenzo il Magnifico. At the feast, 500 guests were seated on a dais which occupied the loggia and the whole of the piazza and the street in front of Palazzo Rucellai.
