= Bernardo Rucellai =

Florentine humanist

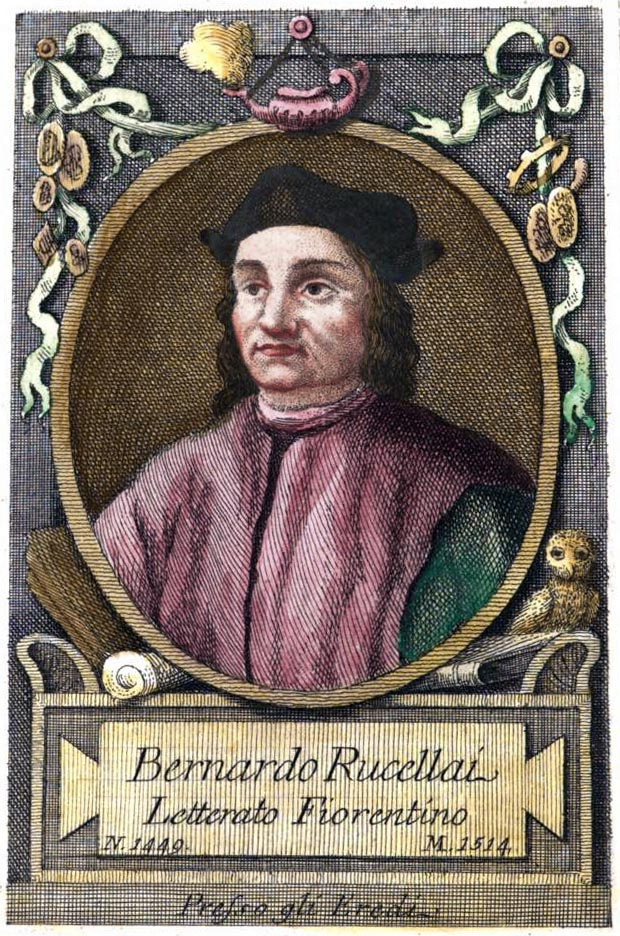
- Engraved portrait from L' Etruria Dotta, ossia raccolta d'elogj di toscani illustri nelle belle lettere e nelle scienze, Deca VI by Francesco Allegrini, Lucca 1786
- Born: 11 August 1448; Florence, Republic of Florence
- Died: 7 October 1514 (aged 66); Florence, Republic of Florence
- Other names: Bernardo di Giovanni Rucellai, Bernardus Oricellarius
- Spouse: Nannina de' Medici (m. 1461; died 1493)
- Children: 5, including Giovanni di Bernardo
- Parents: Giovanni di Paolo Rucellai (father); Iacopa Strozzi (mother)
- Relatives: Palla di Noferi Strozzi (maternal grandfather)

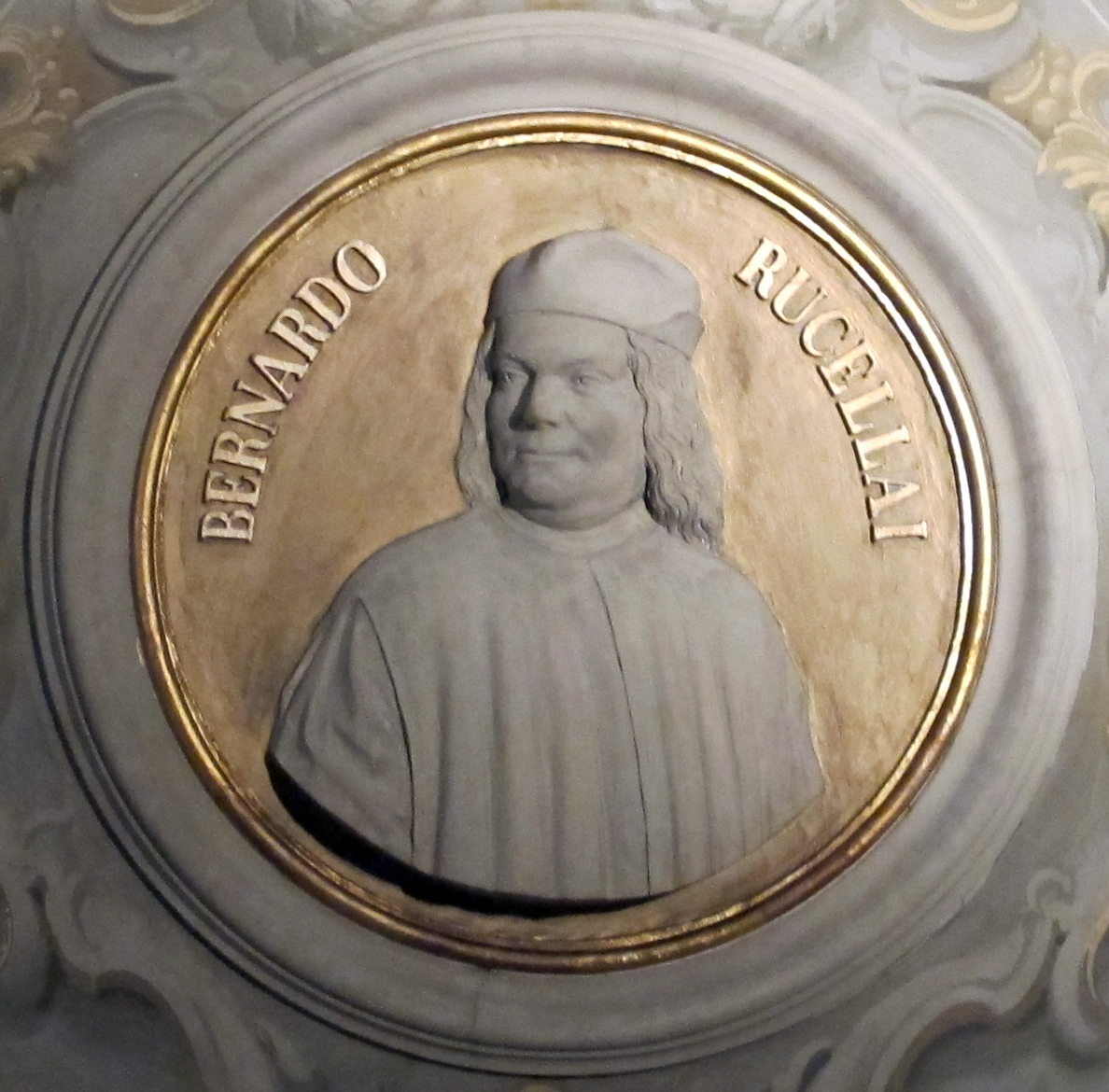
Portrait bust in the Salone Ottocentesco of Palazzo Venturi Ginori

Bernardo Rucellai (11 August 1448 – 7 October 1514), also known as Bernardo di Giovanni Rucellai or Latinised as Bernardus Oricellarius, was a member of the Florentine political and social elite. He was the son of Giovanni di Paolo Rucellai (1403–1481) and father of Giovanni di Bernardo Rucellai (1475–1525). He was married to Nannina de' Medici, the elder sister of Lorenzo de' Medici, and was thus uncle to Popes Leo X and Clement VII, who were cousins. Oligarch, banker, ambassador and man of letters, he is today remembered principally for the meetings of the members of the Accademia Platonica in the Orti Oricellari, the gardens of his house in Florence, the Palazzo Rucellai, where Niccolò Machiavelli gave readings of his Discorsi.

== Family ==
Rucellai was born in Florence on 11 August 1448, second son and one of seven children of the wealthy merchant Giovanni di Paolo Rucellai and of Iacopa Strozzi, daughter of the banker Palla di Noferi Strozzi. Giovanni Rucellai remained loyal to Strozzi after the banishment of the latter to Padua by Cosimo de' Medici in November 1434, and for about 27 years he took no part in public life. However, he became friends with Cosimo, and in 1461 Bernardo, then about 13 years old, was married to Cosimo's granddaughter Nannina de' Medici, daughter of Piero di Cosimo and elder sister to Lorenzo. Nannina was brought to her husband's house five years later, on 8 June 1466. The wedding feast was famous for its opulence: 500 guests were seated on a dais which occupied the Loggia Rucellai and the whole of the piazza and the Via della Vigna Nuova in front of Palazzo Rucellai, the family palace built by Giovanni Rucellai to designs by Leon Battista Alberti.

The couple had five children: Cosimo, Palla, Piero, Giovanni and Lucrezia; it is likely that Tommaso Masini da Peretola was an illegitimate son of Rucellai.

== Political career ==
Rucellai was a member of the political elite of late fifteenth- and early sixteenth-century Florence and held numerous positions in public office. He was on good terms with the ruling Medici family, and was close to his brothers-in-law Lorenzo and Giuliano. Rucellai and Lorenzo were about the same age and were tied by friendship and by common intellectual interests; Rucellai undertook many diplomatic missions either with, or on behalf of, Lorenzo.

In September 1471 he was with Lorenzo in Rome to offer congratulations to Francesco della Rovere on his election as Pope Sixtus IV. Sixtus gave Lorenzo two marble heads, of Augustus and of Agrippa, allowed him to buy precious items belonging to his predecessor, Paul II, and confirmed that the Medici would continue as papal bankers and as agents for the alum mines at Tolfa.

Rucellai was one of the Consiglio dei Cento ("council of one hundred") in 1474. In 1480 he was, with Lorenzo, on the council for the reform of the Studio di Pisa. From 1482 to 1485 he was ambassador to Lorenzo's Sforza allies in Milan. In 1483 he accompanied Lorenzo to Cremona where they hoped to establish an alliance against Venice. In July–August 1485 Rucellai was Gonfaloniere di Giustizia, but remained in Milan. In March 1486 he was one of the Dieci di Balìa, and in the same year was also in Venice. In 1486, Rucellai paid a visit to Pope Innocent VIII on his way to Naples to represent both Florence and the Medici. The family business included negotiating the marriage of his nephew Piero to Alfonsina Orsini. In November 1498, after the demise of the Savonarolan republic, he was Gonfaloniere di Giustizia. In 1512, Rucellai helped lead the effort to remove Piero Soderini from power and restore the Medici.

== Intellectual accomplishments ==
After the death of Lorenzo de' Medici, he opened his gardens, the Orti Oricellari, to the Accademia Platonica in order that they might continue their discussions about literature, classical heritage, rhetoric and Latin grammar. Other famous Florentines in attendance include Niccolò Machiavelli and Francesco Guicciardini.

== Writings ==
Rucellai wrote mainly in Latin. In 1474, after Niccolò Vitelli was besieged by papal forces under Giuliano della Rovere (later pope Julius II) in Città di Castello, Rucellai wrote an Oratio de auxilio Tifernatibus adferendo. He wrote five histories, De urbe Roma liber, De magistratibus Romanis, De bello italico commentarius, De bello Pisano, De bello Mediolanensi.

He left a large body of letters, some of them in Latin. Many of them relate to political matters, including a large number between him and Lorenzo de' Medici. He also corresponded with humanists and intellectuals, among them Francesco Cattani da Diacceto, Andrea Conero, Pietro Dolfin, Marsilio Ficino, Bartolomeo Fonzio, Antonio Ivani da Sarzana and Filippo Redditi.
