= Giovanni di Bernardo Rucellai =

Italian Renaissance humanist (1475–1525)

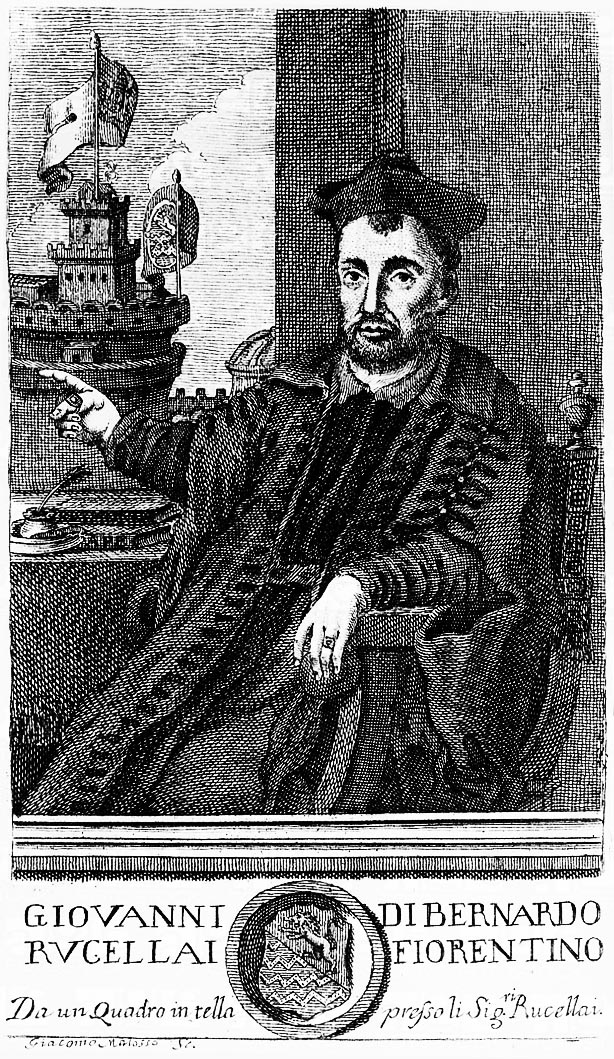
- Portrait of Giovanni di Bernardo Rucellai (1475–1525) with Castel Sant'Angelo in the background, engraved by Giacomo Malosso from a painting owned by the Rucellai family
- Born: Giovanni Rucellai; 20 October 1475; Florence, Florentine Republic
- Died: 3 April 1525 (aged 49); Castel Sant'Angelo, Rome, Papal States
- Occupation: man of letters
- Known for: Oreste, Rosmunda, Le Api
- Parents: Bernardo Rucellai (father); Nannina de' Medici (mother)
- Relatives: Giovanni di Paolo Rucellai (paternal grandfather); Piero di Cosimo de' Medici (maternal grandfather; see there for aunts and uncles); Lucrezia Tornabuoni (maternal grandmother); Lorenzo de' Medici (maternal uncle; see there for cousins)

Giovanni Rucellai (20 October 1475 – 3 April 1525), known as Giovanni di Bernardo Rucellai (with a patronymic), was an Italian humanist, poet, dramatist and man of letters in Renaissance Florence, in Tuscany, Italy. A member of a wealthy family of wool merchants and one of the richest men in Florence, he was cousin to Pope Leo X and linked by marriage to the powerful Strozzi and de' Medici families. He was born in Florence, and died in Rome. He was the son of Bernardo Rucellai (1448–1514) and his wife Nannina de' Medici (1448–1493), and the grandson of Giovanni di Paolo Rucellai (1403–1481). He is now remembered mostly for his poem Le Api ("The Bees"), one of the first poems composed in versi sciolti (blank verse) to achieve widespread acclaim.

== Life ==
Giovanni Rucellai was born on 20 October 1475 in Florence, the fourth son of Bernardo Rucellai and Nannina de' Medici, sister of Lorenzo the Magnificent. He was proficient in Latin, Greek and philosophy; it is not known where or with whom he studied, except that he was a pupil of the philosopher Francesco Cattani da Diacceto.

Giovanni Rucellai was the Florentine ambassador to Venice when, in 1505, the French king Louis XII in Milan requested that the jurist Filippo Decio be allowed to leave his post at Padua, in the Republic of Venice, and move to Pavia. A letter dated 13 May 1506 shows that he was then in Avignon with his father.

In September 1512 Giovanni and his brother Palla may have among those who, when news came to Florence of the sack of Prato by Ramón de Cardona, went to the Palazzo della Signoria to demand the resignation of the Gonfaloniere Piero Soderini. After the return of the de' Medici to Florence, Rucellai enjoyed the favour of his relative Lorenzo di Piero de' Medici, who first made him his Master of Hunt, and later appointed him to the desirable position of provveditore, or administrator, of the Arte della Lana, the wool guild. Rucellai was among those who accompanied his cousin Giovanni di Lorenzo de' Medici, now Pope Leo X, when in 1515 he went to Bologna to negotiate with Francis I of France following his defeat of the Swiss forces at Marignano.

At some time between Leo's return to Florence from Bologna on 22 December 1515 and his departure for Rome on 19 February 1516, he attended a performance of Giovanni Rucellai's tragedy Rosmunda, and perhaps also the Sophonisba of Gian Giorgio Trissino, in the Orti Oricellari, the famous gardens of Palazzo Rucellai, built by Giovanni's grandfather Giovanni di Paolo Rucellai.

Following the death of the pope's brother, Giuliano di Lorenzo de' Medici, on 17 March 1516, his nephew Lorenzo di Piero de' Medici was appointed Captain-General of the Church. Rucellai accompanied him to Rome when he went to receive his insignia. He may have remained there, and have become a priest at this time. When Leo X died, on 1 December 1521, Rucellai was in France. He was the head of the delegation of six Florentine ambassadors appointed on 13 October 1522 to convey to the new pope, Adrian VI, the congratulations and obedience of Florence; due to an outbreak of plague, the delegation did not leave for Rome until April of the following year. Rucellai's Latin oration is preserved.

Adrian died a few months later and was succeeded on 19 November 1523 by Giulio di Giuliano de' Medici as Clement VII. Giulio was Rucellai's illegitimate cousin, and soon appointed him Castellano of Castel Sant'Angelo. A book in dialogue form by Gian Giorgio Trissino on the Italian language is called Il Castellano; it records the discussions of Trissino, Rucellai and other friends in the small garden of Castel Sant'Angelo, with its bitter orange trees.

Giovanni Rucellai died in Castel Sant'Angelo on 3 April 1525.

== Works ==
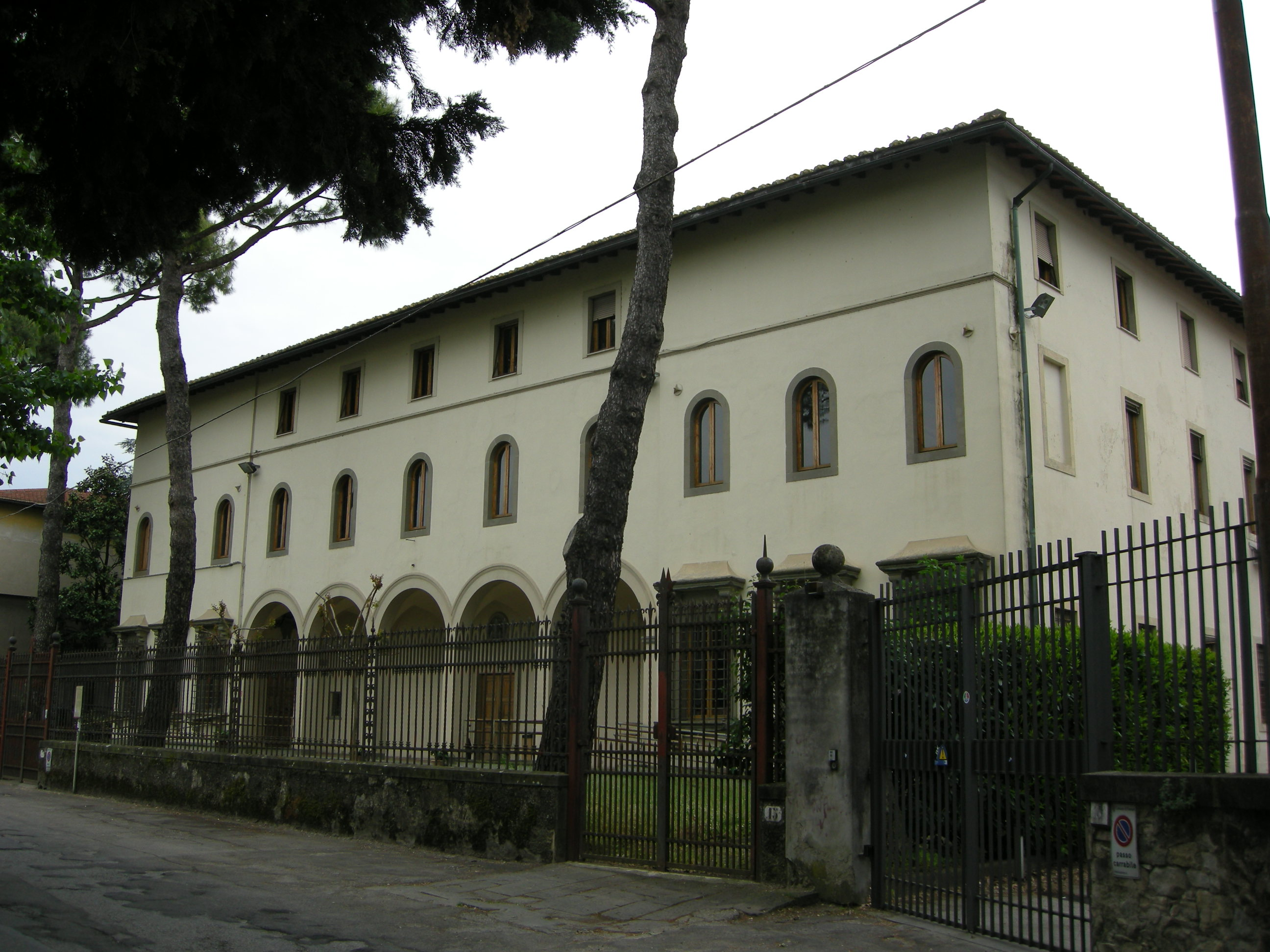
Villa lo Specchio at Quaracchi, the country estate of the Rucellai family, where Le Api was written

Giovanni di Bernardo wrote two tragedies, Oreste, a paraphrase of the Iphigenia in Tauris of Euripides, and Rosmunda, based on the Hecuba of the same author. Both were completed by early in 1516, and are often cited together with the Sophonisba (1515) of Gian Giorgio Trissino as being the first classical tragedies in the vernacular language that would later be called Italian; they are also the earliest works to be written in blank (unrhymed) hendecasyllables. Rosmunda was published in Siena in 1525, and reprinted several times in the 16th century. Despite the efforts of Benedetto Varchi to have it published, Oreste was not printed until it was included in the first volume of Teatro italiano, o sia, Scelta di tragedie per uso della scena, introduced and possibly also selected by Scipione Maffei, together with Trissino's Sophonisba, a translation by Orsato Giustiniano of the Oedipus of Sophocles, and the Merope of Pomponio Torelli.

Rucellai's blank verse poem Le Api ("the bees") dates from 1524 and was published posthumously in 1539 with a dedication by his brother Palla Rucellai to Gian Giorgio Trissino. It was written in the gardens of the country estate of the Rucellai family at Quaracchi, now in the suburbs of Florence; the gardens are described in the Zibaldone of Rucellai's grandfather Giovanni di Paolo Rucellai, and are believed to be among the earliest examples of the Italian garden.

=== Editions ===
- Rosmunda di misser Giouanni Ruscellai patritio fiorentino. Et della rocca di Adriano defensore fidelissimo. Impresso in Siena: per Michelagnolo di Bartho. f.; ad instantia di Giouanni di Alixandro libraro, adi XXVII di aprile 1525
- Le api di m. Giouanni Rucellai gentil'huomo fiorentino, le quali compose in Roma de l'anno MDXXIIII, essendo quivi castellano di Castel Sant'Angelo. [Vinegia: per Giouanni Antonio di Nicolini da Sabio, nel anno del Signore 1539 l'ultimo giorno del mese innanzi aprile]
- Oratio Johannis Oricellarii ad Hadrianum VI. Pontificem Maximum, in [Apostolo Zeno, Piercaterino Zeno], Giornale de' letterati d'Italia, Tomo trentesimoterzo, parte I (volume 33, part 1). In Venezia MDCCXXI: Appresso Gio. Gabbriello Hertz. Con licenza de' superiori, e privilegio anche di N.S. Clemente XI, 1721, pp. 328–338
- Oreste, in Teatro italiano, o sia, Scelta di tragedie per uso della scena; tomo primo. In Verona MDCCXXIII: presso Jacopo Vallarsi. [introduction by Scipione Maffei].
- Le opere di m. Giovanni Rucellai: ora per la prima volta in un volume raccolte, e con somma diligenza ristampate. In Padova: Appresso Giuseppe Comino, 1772. The first collected edition.
