= Giovanni di Paolo Rucellai =

Florentine businessman

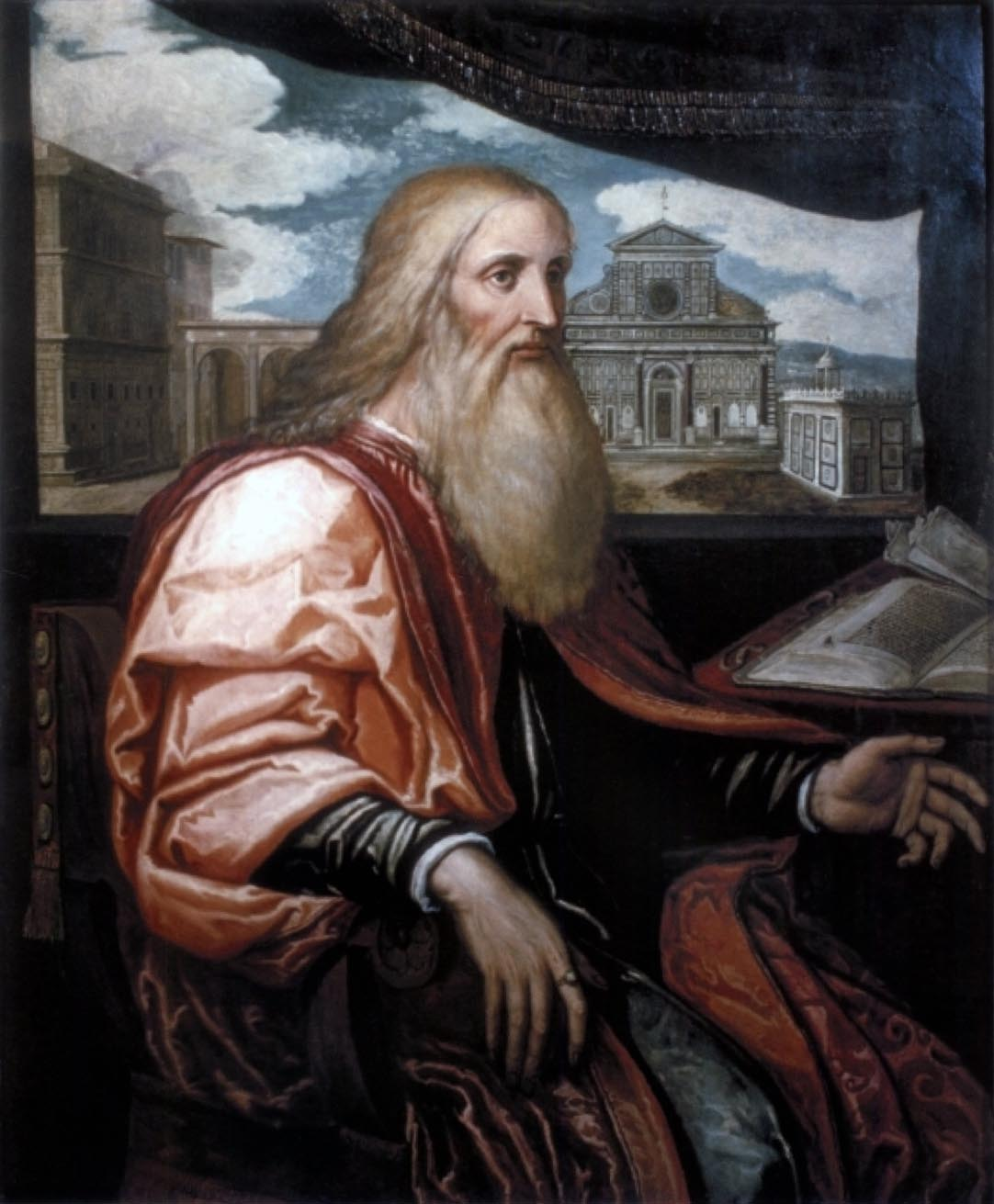
- Patronage portrait of Giovanni di Paolo Rucellai, in the background his principal works in Florence: Palazzo and Loggia Rucellai, the façade of Santa Maria Novella and the Tempietto of the Holy Sepulchre. Oil on board, attributed to Francesco Salviati, c. 1540.
- Born: Giovanni Rucellai; 26 December 1403; Florence, Republic of Florence
- Died: 1481 (aged 77–78); Florence, Republic of Florence
- Known for: Palazzo Rucellai, patronage of the arts, façade of Santa Maria Novella, the Zibaldone
- Spouse(s): Iacopa Strozzi (m. c. 1428)
- Children: including Bernardo
- Relatives: Giovanni di Bernardo Rucellai (grandson)

Giovanni Rucellai (26 December 1403 – 1481), known by his name with the patronymic Giovanni di Paolo Rucellai, was a member of a wealthy family of wool merchants in Renaissance Florence, in Tuscany, Italy. He held political posts under Cosimo and Lorenzo de' Medici, but is principally remembered for building Palazzo Rucellai and the Rucellai Sepulchre, for his patronage of the marble façade of the church of Santa Maria Novella, and as author of an important Zibaldone. He was the father of Bernardo Rucellai (1448–1514) and grandfather of Giovanni di Bernardo Rucellai (1475–1525).

== Life ==
Giovanni di Paolo Rucellai was born on 26 December 1403 to Paolo Rucellai and Caterina di Filippo Pandolfini, one of three children born in the 40 months of their marriage before the early death of Paolo Rucellai. As a young man, Giovanni di Paolo entered the banking house of Palla di Noferi Strozzi and at the age of about 25 married his daughter Iacopa di Palla Strozzi. The couple had two sons and five daughters. Rucellai remained loyal to Strozzi after the banishment of the latter to Padua by Cosimo de' Medici in November 1434, and for about 27 years, he took no part in public life. However, he became friends with Cosimo, and in 1461, his second son, Bernardo di Giovanni Rucellai, then about 13 years old, was married to Cosimo's granddaughter Nannina de' Medici, daughter of Piero di Cosimo de' Medici and elder sister to Lorenzo. Nannina was brought to her husband's house five years later, on 8 June 1466. The wedding feast was famous for its opulence: 500 guests were seated on a daïs which occupied the loggia and the whole of the piazza and the street in front of Palazzo Rucellai.

Giovanni di Paolo was the effective head of the Rucellai family. He served as Prior in 1463 and as Gonfaloniere di Giustizia in 1475. He died in Florence in 1481 and was buried in the Rucellai Sepulchre.

== Patronage ==
Giovanni di Paolo was an important patron of the arts, matched only by Cosimo de' Medici in fifteenth-century Florence. He commissioned the building of the Palazzo Rucellai, designed by Leon Battista Alberti, and of the Loggia Rucellai. Alberti also provided the designs for the Rucellai Sepulchre, a small funerary chapel built inside the Rucellai Chapel of the church of San Pancrazio, in imitation or emulation of the Holy Sepulchre in the Anastasis in Jerusalem. At Quaracchi, on the road from Florence to Pistoia, he built a fine villa, noted for its gardens.

His most notable donation, the marble façade by Alberti for Santa Maria Novella, was but one of the family's commissions of public art. For the Palazzo Rucellai he commissioned works from Andrea del Castagno, Desiderio da Settignano, Filippo Lippi, Piero del Pollaiuolo, Paolo Uccello, Verrocchio, Domenico Veneziano, Vittorio Ghiberti and Giovanni Bertini.

== The Zibaldone ==
Giovanni di Paolo Rucellai was well-acquainted with the classics, and he kept a Zibaldone into which he copied his translations of passages from Greek and Latin authors such as Aristotle, Boethius and Seneca the Younger.
