= Institut Saint Dominique =

Institut Saint Dominique (ISD) is an international school in northern Rome, Italy, belonging to the Odyssey Education Group.

The school provides a trilingual curriculum (French, English, and Italian).

ISD, recognized by the AEFE and providing a boarding school, offers international examinations and certifications (such as Cambridge International GCE A-levels, International Baccalaureate, Terza Media, Esabac, Baccalauréat...).

== See also ==
- Istituto Statale Italiano Leonardo Da Vinci - The Italian school in Paris
- Lycée français Chateaubriand - A French School in Rome
