= Lycée Stendhal de Milan =

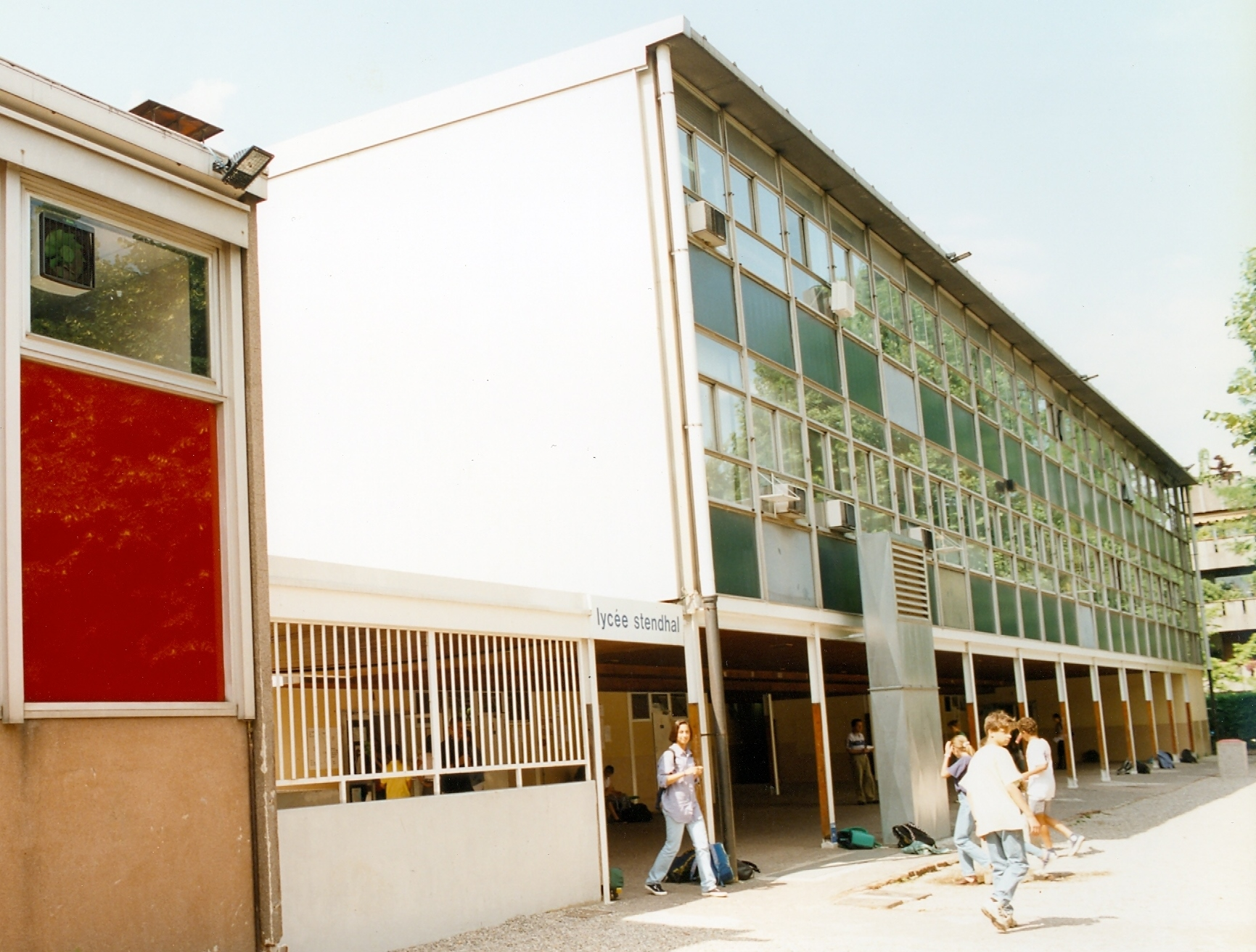

Location
- Via Laveno, 12; Milan 20148; Italy

Information
- Type: French International
- Established: October 1946
- Founder: French Chamber of Commerce in Italy, Madame Meyer
- Headmaster: Emmanuelle Monticino
- Grades: Pre-K – 13
- Gender: Coeducational
- Age: 3 to 18
- Enrollment: 1180
- Language: French and others
- Website: www.lsmi.it/le-lycee-stendhal

The Lycée Stendhal de Milan (Italian: Liceo Stendhal) is a French international primary and secondary school located in Via Laveno, 12 in Milan, Italy. It is directly managed by the Agency for French Teaching Abroad (AEFE), with its curriculum accredited by the France Ministry of National Education and overseen by the French Ministry of Europe and Foreign Affairs.

There is also an "Italian Section" for Italian-speaking pupils in the secondary classes which prepare for the three-year EsaBac program and the dual-diploma that comes with it. The school has over 1170 students of 37 different nationalities.

== History ==
=== Early years ===
In 1946, the French Chamber of Commerce in Italy created a French school inside of its headquarters in Milan for the children of expats. Its first year, the school had six alumni. In 1951, under the guidance of its first principal, Madame Meyer, the lycée moved to a small apartment in Milan's Via Rugabella, allowing the number of students to reach 45.

In 1959 however, French president and General de Gaulle and Italian president Giovanni Gronchi met in Milan to celebrate the centenary of the Battle of Magenta. To commemorate his visit, the city council decided to officialize the French school and offered it a plot of land to build its first campus. The construction was completed by 1961. The arrival of a larger school got the number of students to 162.

=== The road to self-sufficiency ===
By 1963, partly due to the permanent closure of the nearby French Catholic School, the number of pupils attending the school reached 500.

In the year 1977, thanks to this increase in student attendance, the high school hosted for the first time in its history the baccalauréat, ending high school students' longtime custom of travelling to Rome and passing their exam at the Lycée français Chateaubriand. The change was met with mixed feelings: Families rejoiced to the idea because it would avoid the weeks-long, complicated and expensive travel of pupils to Rome; however alumni mostly cherished this thirty year-long tradition and enjoyed ending their school year with this sort of 'holiday' to the capital, which also helped alleviate the stress of the exam. This change symbolically showed the level of independence the school had gained, no longer living in the shadow of its Roman counterpart. From a national point of view, this represented the new bipolar characteristics of French education in Italy (as opposed to the previously centralised approach), with three French schools in the south and three in the north of the country, the first being controlled by the Roman institute, the second by Milan's.

The following years saw an expansion of the campus: First a new building for kindergarten pupils in 1970, then a new gym in 1979 and finally a second floor to host primary students in 1983. In 1982, Madame Meyer left her place as the lycée's head master after 31 consecutive years due to her having reached the age of retirement. She was awarded the Ordre national du Mérite, a prestigious French order of merit, by the French consul in Milan for her vital contributions in transforming what was once a petite école (small school) into a true établissement (educational institute). Indeed, under her administration, the number of alumni went from 6 to over half a thousand. In 1990 the school was named Stendhal to honour the French author who spent much of his life in Milan. The romantic writer in fact believed the city was 'one of the most beautiful places in the universe'.

=== Twenty First Century ===
In the year 2000, the city council agreed to double the initial surface of the school. By 2006, the campus was finalised and ready to host an increasing number of students, especially of Italian and foreign origin. It is believed that with current growth rates of the student body, the lycée shall soon be confronted with a lack of space. The construction of a new building on school ground or the possibility of asking the city council for a new surface expansion are both options being currently discussed.

On May 19, 2018, the school celebrated its seventieth anniversary.

== Campus ==
The current campus was built in the year 2000 by a French architectural bureau. The previous one, which lied on the same terrain, was built threw successive expansions of the initial building. The issues with the first structure were mostly aesthetic, the campus was a chaotic assemble of temporary buildings, as well as logistic; indeed the structure hadn't been planned to accommodate more than 800 alumni and to last beyond the turn of the century. The possibility of limiting student attendance was discussed but quickly deemed an unfit solution as it would have limited the school's prominence.

The construction process took about three months. During this time, pupils followed classes in the gym, which had been equipped with school material and temporary walls/classrooms to simulate a functioning campus. The large glass structure which makes up the main hall and entrance to the campus was made to represent the openness of French culture towards Milan and the Italian people. The cost of construction was about ten million euros and was completely financed by the Ministry of Europe and Foreign Affairs.

== Expansion ==
The increase in the number of students attending the lycée in past years is likely linked to the economic expansion of the Milan metropolitan area, which in terms of annual GDP (€400 billion in 2014) has already surpassed the city of Berlin as well as the Philippines. Indeed, almost eight thousand people of French citizenship now live in this area, making up almost one in two hundred of all residents.

This increase can be attributed to the arrival of new pupils of Italian and foreign citizenship. According to non-French parents of students attending the school, its main assets seem to be its international environment, the importance given to humanist values, relative degrees of strictness (i.e. Cellphones cannot be used inside the campus) and the rule of discipline (i.e.: Dress code) which testify of the quality education alumni receive.

== Curriculum ==
The Lycée Stendhal of Milan is a French International School. Indeed, it uses French as the primary language of instruction, but other languages are taught as well:

- Italian is the second most taught language. Learning Italian is compulsory from elementary school up to high school. During secondary school, students are subdivided into three groups: débutants for those who have no knowledge of Italian, intermédiaire for those who have a satisfactory level and finally avancé for those who are fluent in Italian. Starting from Seconde (Year 11) however, the avancé category is replaced by the EsaBac, a prestigious three-year course which grants participating students a dual French and Italian diploma by the end of high school. It includes extra hours dedicated to the study of Italian literature, history, and geography. The EsaBac program is considered to be one of the school's major assets.
- The study of English is compulsory for all pupils in primary and in secondary school. A large portion of the student body, due to its international background, is fluent in English. Although the average high school student has about three hours of classes taught in English per week, by Première (year 12) students can, if they choose to, increase that number to seven hours of English per week. This number climbs to nine hours per week the following year if a student wishes to do so.
- German and Spanish are taught as foreign languages in the school from Quatrième (year 8) onwards. In year 7, pupils must choose whether they want to study German or Spanish for the rest of High School for about three hours a week.
- The study of Latin is optional for students from Cinquième (year 7) onwards. Students choosing to take this option will likely receive bonus points for their Baccalauréat. Abandoning or continuing the study of Latin is an option pupils are granted each year.

Although the lycée does not offer dual-diplomas in English, students are expected to be fluent speakers by year 13. Indeed, a large portion of the student body is trilingual. This, added to the importance given to the study of foreign languages, prepares students to go study anywhere after high school, whether it be in France or abroad.

== Student body ==
Over 37 different nationalities are represented in the student body. Although Italians and French make up a majority of students, many pupils also come from the rest of Europe, Africa, the Americas, the Middle East and the Far East.

== Alumni association ==
L'Association des Anciens élèves du Lycée Stendhal de Milan (AALSMI) is the official alumni association of the school. Founded on November 9, 2010, its initial purpose was to make it easier for previous pupils of the school from around the world, who had once again joined to celebrate the 60th anniversary of the school in May 2008, to keep in touch. The Association now has over 1400 members and organises yearly galas as well as basketball, tennis and golf tournaments in the Lycée or in different locations in France to incentivize communication amongst former pupils.

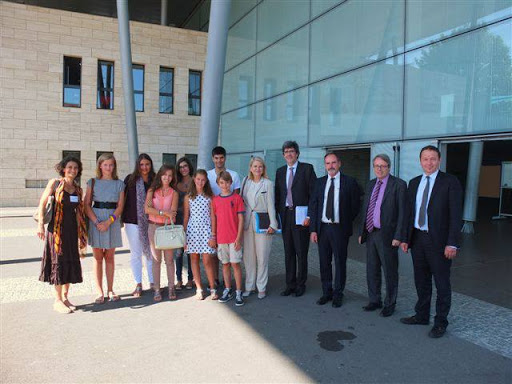
French Senator Joëlle Garriaud-Maylam visiting the lycée

== Notable alumni ==
- The French Prime minister Dominique de Villepin studied at the Lycée Stendhal.

== Tuition ==
Tuition and payment procedures should be directly discussed with the school threw the official website as fees vary from one alumni to the other depending on age, merit, nationality and income. Generally speaking, school fees tend to go from a low of four thousand euros per year for elementary students to a high of seven thousand euros per year for high school students.

== Administration ==
The school is one of six in Italy to be directly supervised by The Agency for French Education Abroad. The programs are decided by the Ministry of National Education and are therefore the same as in public schools in France. However, it is the Ministry of Europe and Foreign Affairs which manages the school.
