= Nannina de' Medici =

Italian noblewoman (1448–1493)

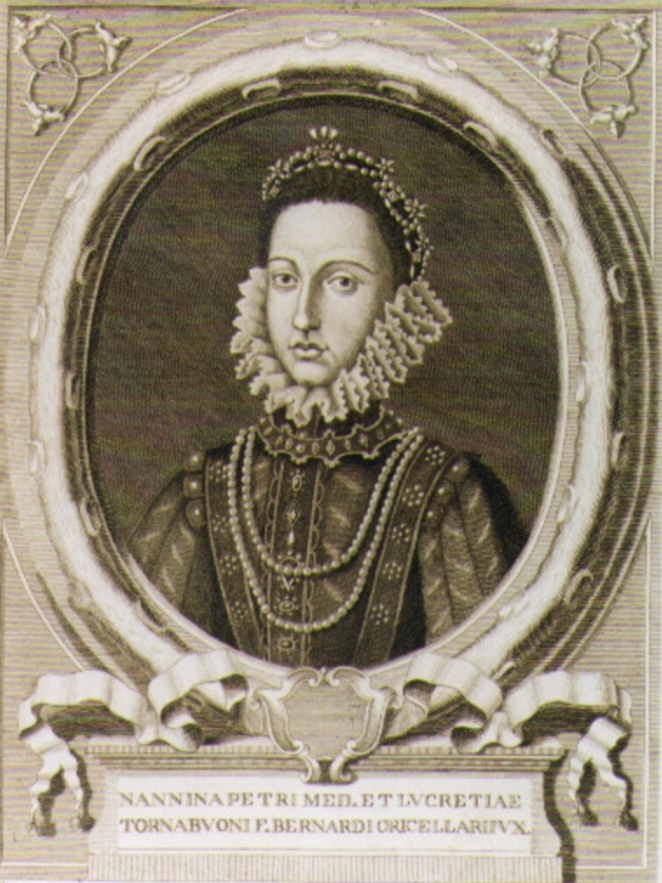
- Born: Lucrezia de' Medici; 14 February 1448; Florence, Republic of Florence
- Died: 14 May 1493 (aged 45); Florence, Republic of Florence
- Other name: Lucrezia di Piero de' Medici
- Spouse: Bernardo Rucellai (m. 1461)
- Children: 5, including Giovanni di Bernardo Rucellai
- Parents: Piero di Cosimo de' Medici (father); Lucrezia Tornabuoni (mother)
- Relatives: Lorenzo de' Medici (brother); Bianca de' Medici (sister); Giuliano de' Medici (brother)

Lucrezia "Nannina" de' Medici (14 February 1448 – 14 May 1493), sometimes known by the longer name Lucrezia di Piero de' Medici (including a patronymic), was the second daughter of Piero di Cosimo de' Medici and Lucrezia Tornabuoni. She was thus the elder sister of Lorenzo de' Medici. She married Bernardo Rucellai.

== Life ==
Lucrezia de' Medici was born in Florence on 14 February 1448, the second daughter of Piero di Cosimo de' Medici and Lucrezia Tornabuoni. She was nicknamed Nannina, which had been the nickname of her great-grandmother Piccarda Bueri. She received a cultured and refined education.

In 1461, at the age of about 13, she was married to Bernardo Rucellai with a dowry of 2500 fiorini d'oro. Nannina was brought to her husband's house five years later, on 8 June 1466. The wedding feast was famous for its opulence: 500 guests were seated on a triangular dais which occupied the loggia and the whole of the piazza and the street in front of Palazzo Rucellai. The couple had five children, Cosimo, Piero, Palla, Giovanni and Lucrezia.

Nannina de' Medici died on 14 May 1493 and was buried in the Rucellai Chapel of the church of San Pancrazio in Florence.
