= Lycée Victor Hugo (Italy) =

- École française de Florence – Mlf Lycée Victor Hugo
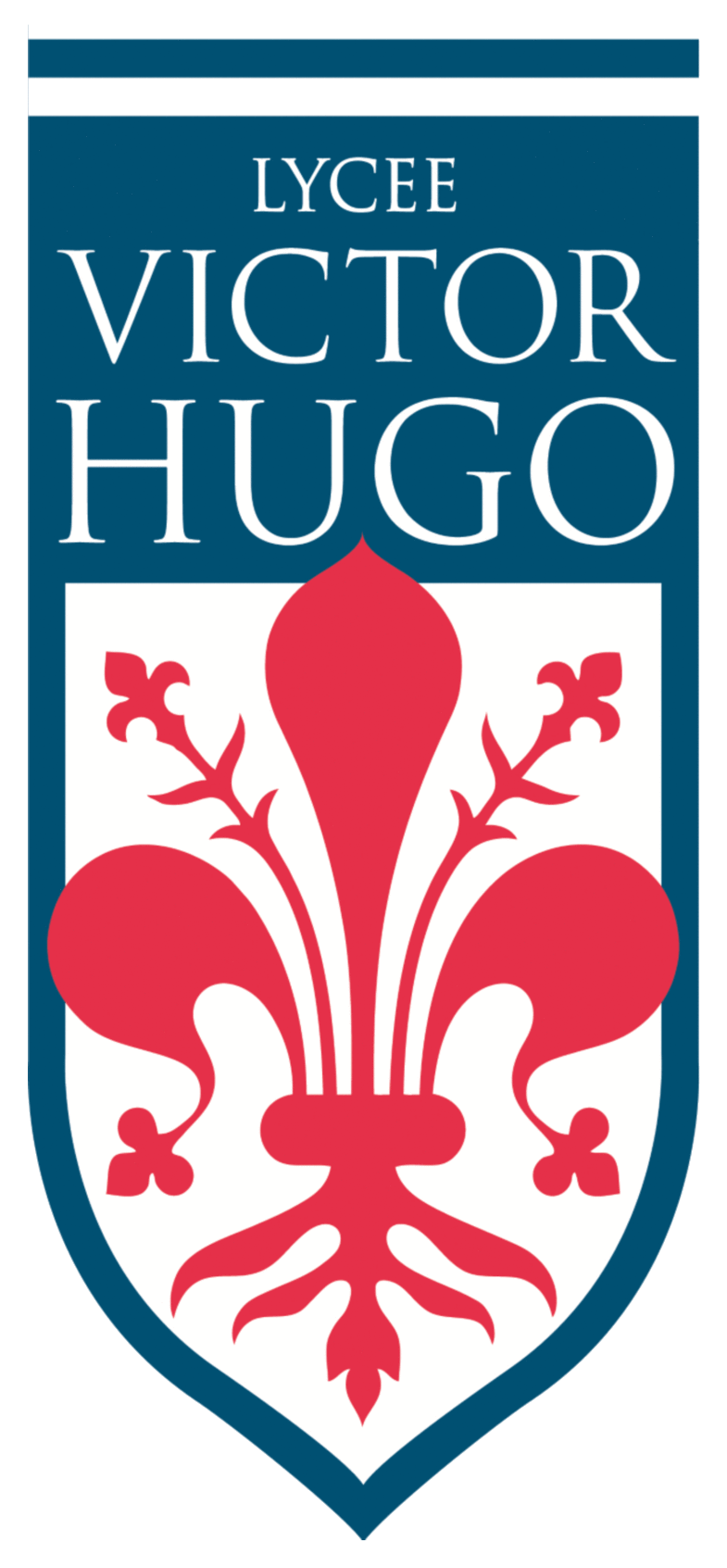

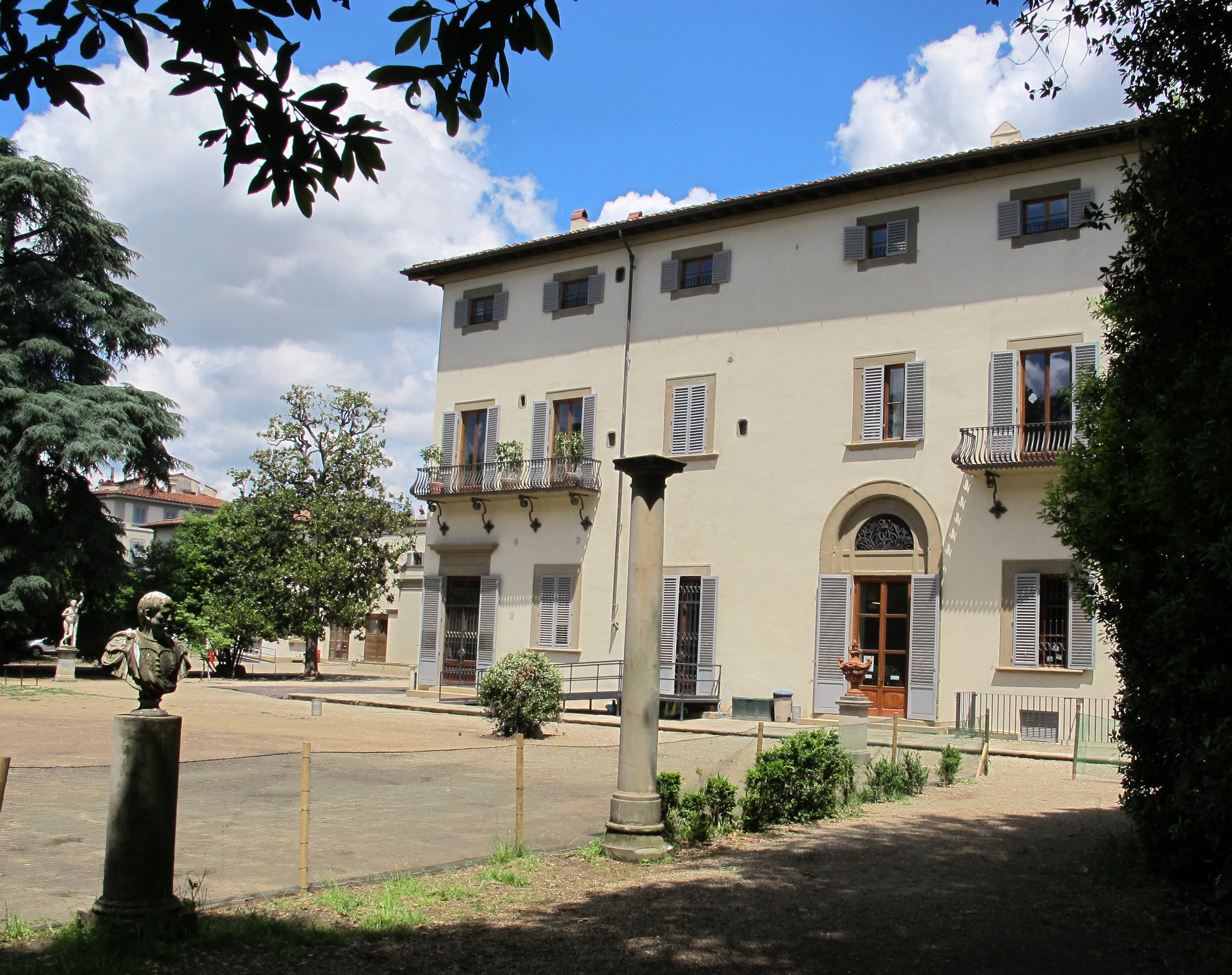

Location
- Palazzo Venturi Ginori; Via della Scala, 85; 50123 Florence; Italy
- Coordinates: 43.77608°N 11.24453°E

Information
- Type: French International school
- Motto: Two cultures, three languages
- Established: 1976
- Principal: Bénédicte Bessette
- Grades: From Preschool to 12th Grade
- Enrollment: 465 (2017/2018)
- Language: French, Italian, English
- Affiliation: Mission laïque française (since 2007)
- Information: Mlf School
- Exam Preparation: French national diploma, Baccalauréat, EsaBac
- Languages taught: French, Italian, English, Spanish, German, Mandarin, Latin
- Language Certifications: English (Cambridge English), Italian (CILS), Spanish (DELE)
- Particularities: Three-language classes starting from the second year of Nursery school (French, English, Italian)
- Website: vhugo.eu

The Lycée Victor Hugo (French: École française de Florence – Mlf Lycée Victor Hugo) is a French international school in Florence, Italy. It was established in 1976 and has integrated the Mission laïque française (Mlf) in 2007. It serves levels maternelle (preschool) through terminale, the final year of lycée (senior high school) and it allows French, English and Italian languages learning from preschool for all children. As of 2017 the school has about 500 students range from 2 to 18 years.

== Palazzo Venturi Ginori ==
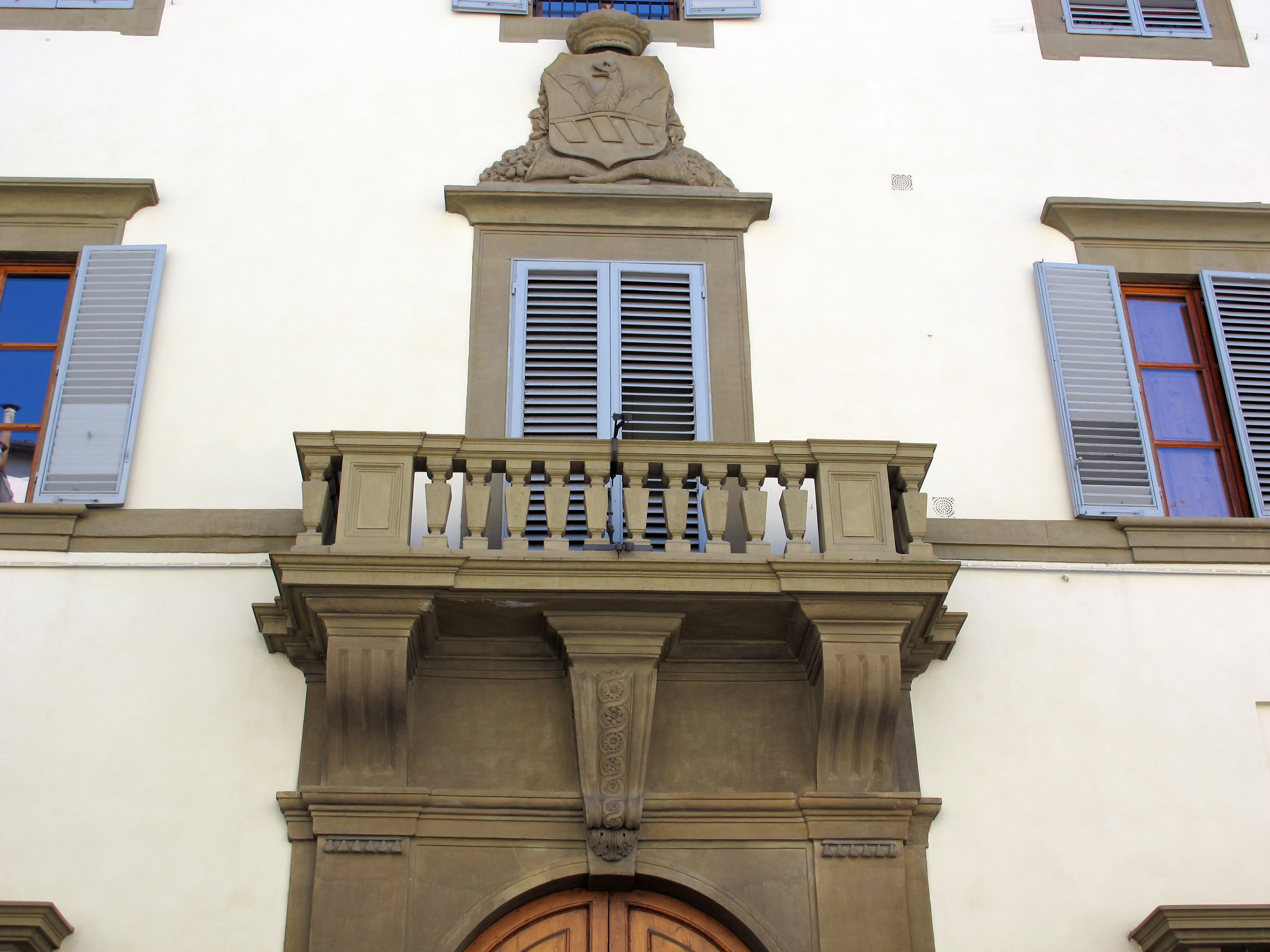
Portal

The Lycée is located in the palace once known as the Palazzo Venturi Ginori, built in 1498 for Bernardo Rucellai on land owned by his wife Nannina de' Medici. In 1459, Cosimo de' Medici sponsored meetings of a neoplatonic Academy in this palace. The palace suffered with the temporary expulsion of the Medici in 1527, but was soon refurbished. In 1537, the Rucellai heirs sold the property to Bianca Cappello. In 1663, the Cardinal Giovanni Carlo Medici sells much of the contents of the palace, and the structure is bought by the Marquis Ridolfi Montescudaio. The palace interiors were refurbished in the early 19th century in a neoclassical style. The gardens were redone in a British style. In 1861, an owner, Countess Orloff employs Giuseppe Poggi in renovations.

== See also ==
- Agency for French Education Abroad
- Education in France
- International school
- Institut français de Florence
- List of international schools
- Mission laïque française
- Multilingualism
- Victor Hugo
