= Lycée français Chateaubriand =

French international school in Rome

Lycée français Chateaubriand de Rome
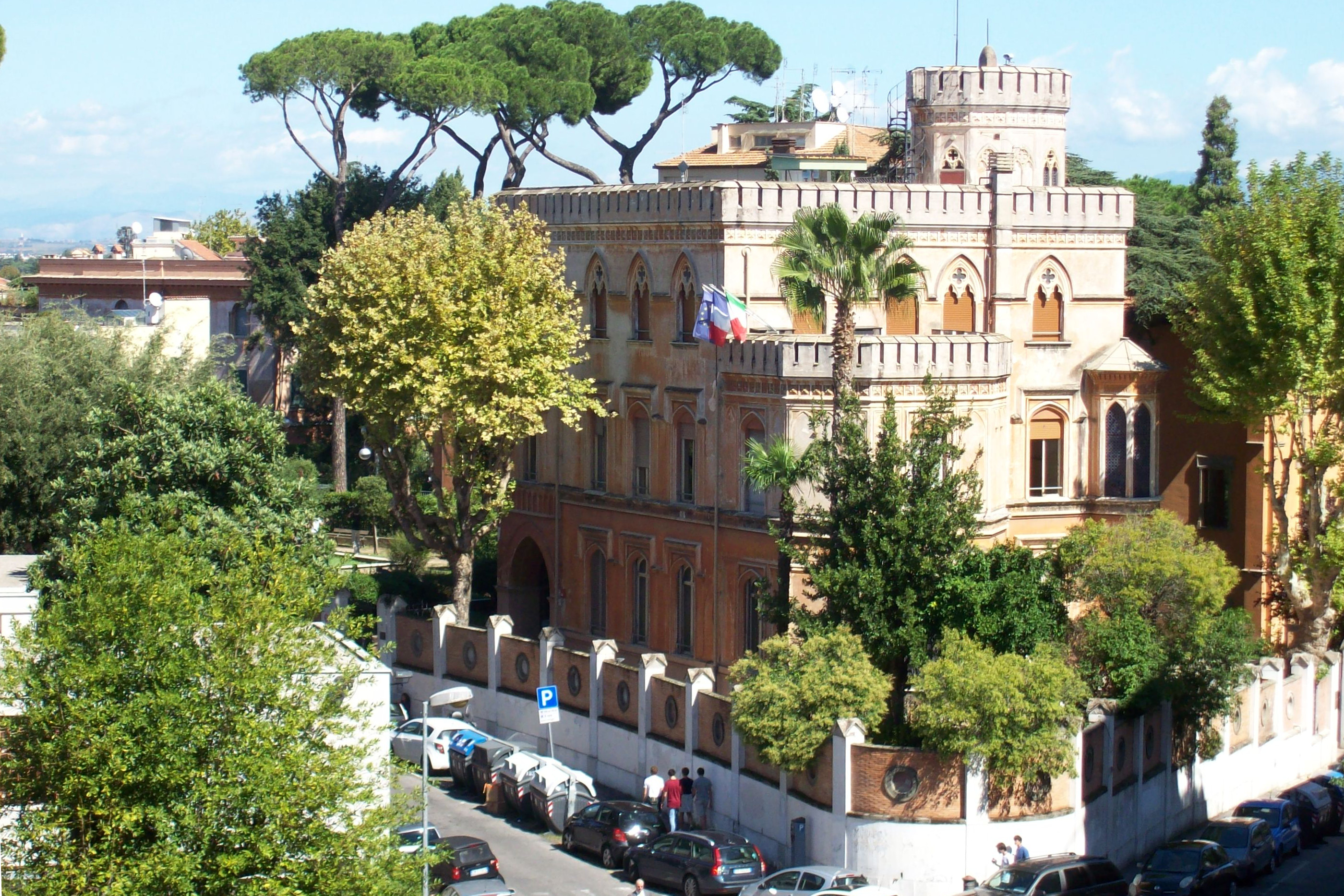
- Rome, Italy

Information
- Type: Independent school, primary and secondary
- Established: 1903
- Grades: K-12
- Gender: Mixed
- Enrollment: Total: c.1,400.
- Website: Official website

The Lycée français Chateaubriand de Rome (Italian: Liceo Chateaubriand) is a French international primary and secondary school with two campuses consisting of three buildings in Rome, Italy. Its administration and senior high school/sixth-form college classes are located in the historic Villa de Via Patrizi building, while other classes are held at a former Christian private school and at the Villa Strohl-Fern.

It is directly operated by the Agency for French Education Abroad (AEFE), an agency of the French government.

The Istituto Statale Italiano Leonardo Da Vinci, the Italian school of Paris, is considered to be its sister school. This was established by the Convention Culturelle italo francese of November 4, 1949.

== History ==
The Lycée français Chateaubriand opened on 3 November 1903 after St-Louis-des-Français Church choirmaster Charles Dumaz and the French Embassy in the Vatican campaigned for the opening of a school for French students. The school, initially housed in an apartment building at Via Sistina, 20, initially was unable to have Italian national students as the Italian government did not allow them to attend international schools; its initial enrollment was 10 students of other nationalities, with three each from France and Switzerland and two each from Romania and the United States.

It moved to Via della Scrofa, 115, another apartment building, in 1907, and by World War I it had about 50 students. For a period it occupied Palazzo Ricci Paracciani for a three-month period and moved into the Villa de Via Patrizi in October 1920. The school temporarily closed during World War II.

Among the pupils who attended the Lycée during its early decades was the future writer and journalist Edmonde Charles-Roux. She later recalled her years at Chateaubriand, where she studied for fourteen years while her father served as the French ambassador in Rome, as “a time of light and discovery.”

In 1958 the school began assigning increasing year levels to a new campus at Villa Strohl-Fern; the school wanted to move all grade levels there, but this was not possible due to issues with the government of the City of Rome. In 1980 the school purchased a building that formerly held an Augustinian private school.

== Curriculum ==
The school uses the French educational system with French as the primary medium of instruction. The school has Italian language classes to an advanced level. It does not have a bilingual programme.

== Campuses ==
There are two campuses in Rome. Patrizi/Malpighi, includes two buildings with a total of 2,500 square metres (27,000 square feet) of space: Via Patrizi, a historic property which houses the school administration, and a former Augustinian private school building. The Patrizi/Malpighi campus serves high school grades and the final year of junior high school (troisième through terminale). As of 2016 this campus houses about 500 students. The school began renting space in the Via Patrizi in October 1920 and purchased the building in 1921. The school acquired the Augustinian school building in 1980.

The Strohl Fern campus, the campus for preschool through junior high school (except for troisième), is a property with 8 hectares (20 acres) of space previously owned by Count Alfred Wilhelm Strohl; it was given to the French government in 1927 and to the school in 1958. This campus has a large garden. As of 2016 about 1,000 students attend school at Strohl Fern.

The École française Alexandre Dumas in Naples is administered through Lycée français Chateaubriand.

== Student body ==
As of 2016 the school has about 1,500 students, with about 40% being solely Italian citizens, 20% being dual Italian and French citizens, 20% being solely French citizens, and 20% from other countries.

== Chateaubrianais ==
The use of a pidgin called «chateaubrianais» has developed among Italian and French-speaking pupils, made up of Frenchised Italian words and vice versa.

== Notable alumni ==
- Edmonde Charles-Roux, writer and journalist, winner of the Prix Goncourt (1966).
- Chiara Mastroianni, actress.
- Riccardo Cocciante, singer and songwriter.
- Cristina Comencini and Francesca Comencini, filmmakers.
- Marzio Perrelli, CEO at HSBC Italy.
- Alberto Angela, writer, film maker and icon.
- Zerocalcare, cartoonist.
- Mélusine Ruspoli, model and fashion influencer.
- Esmeralda Ruspoli, actress.

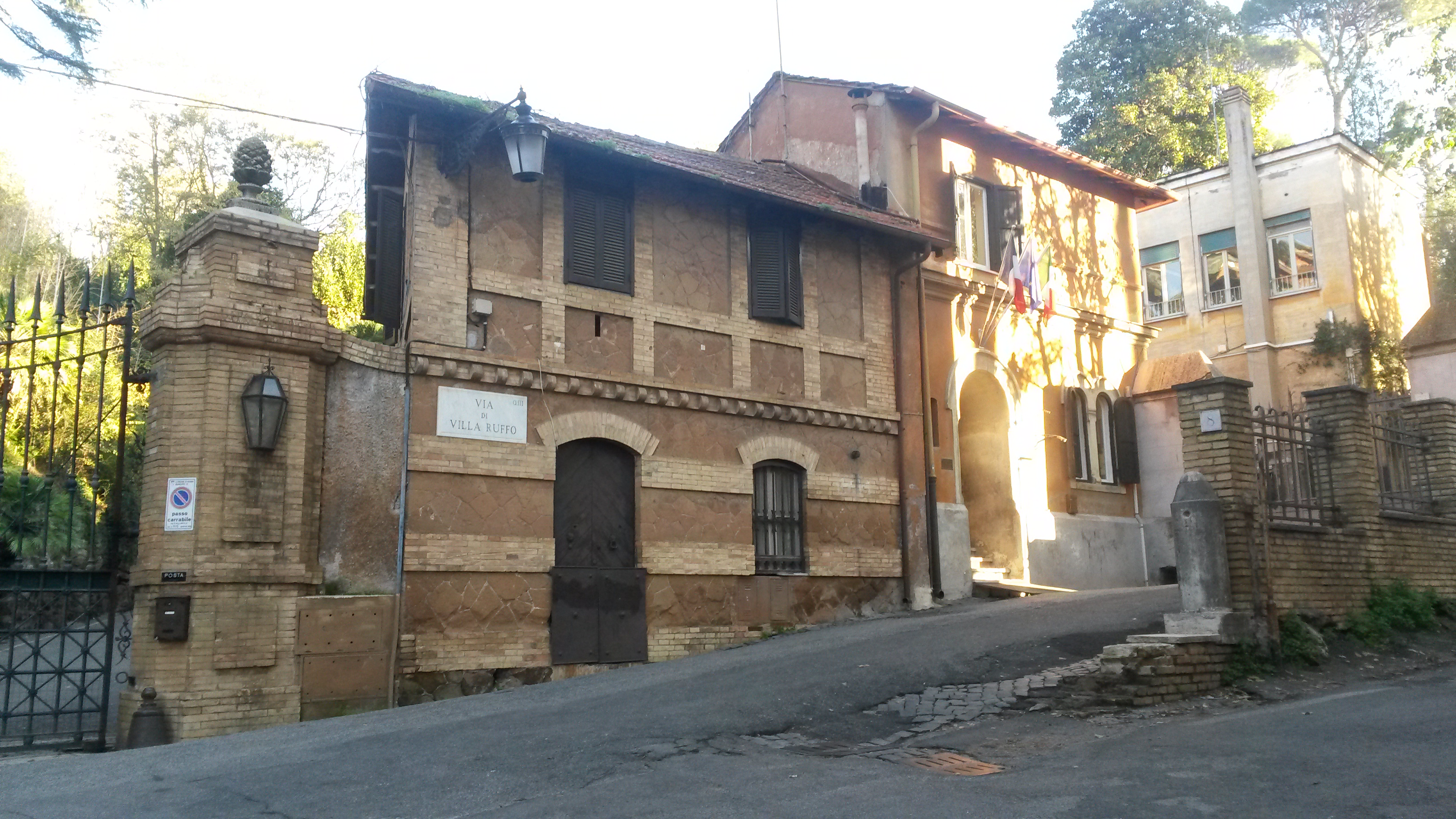

== See also ==
- Istituto Statale Italiano Leonardo Da Vinci - The Italian school in Paris
- Institut Saint Dominique
