= Palazzo Rucellai =

Palace in Florence, Italy

Coordinates: 43.7712°N 11.2495°E

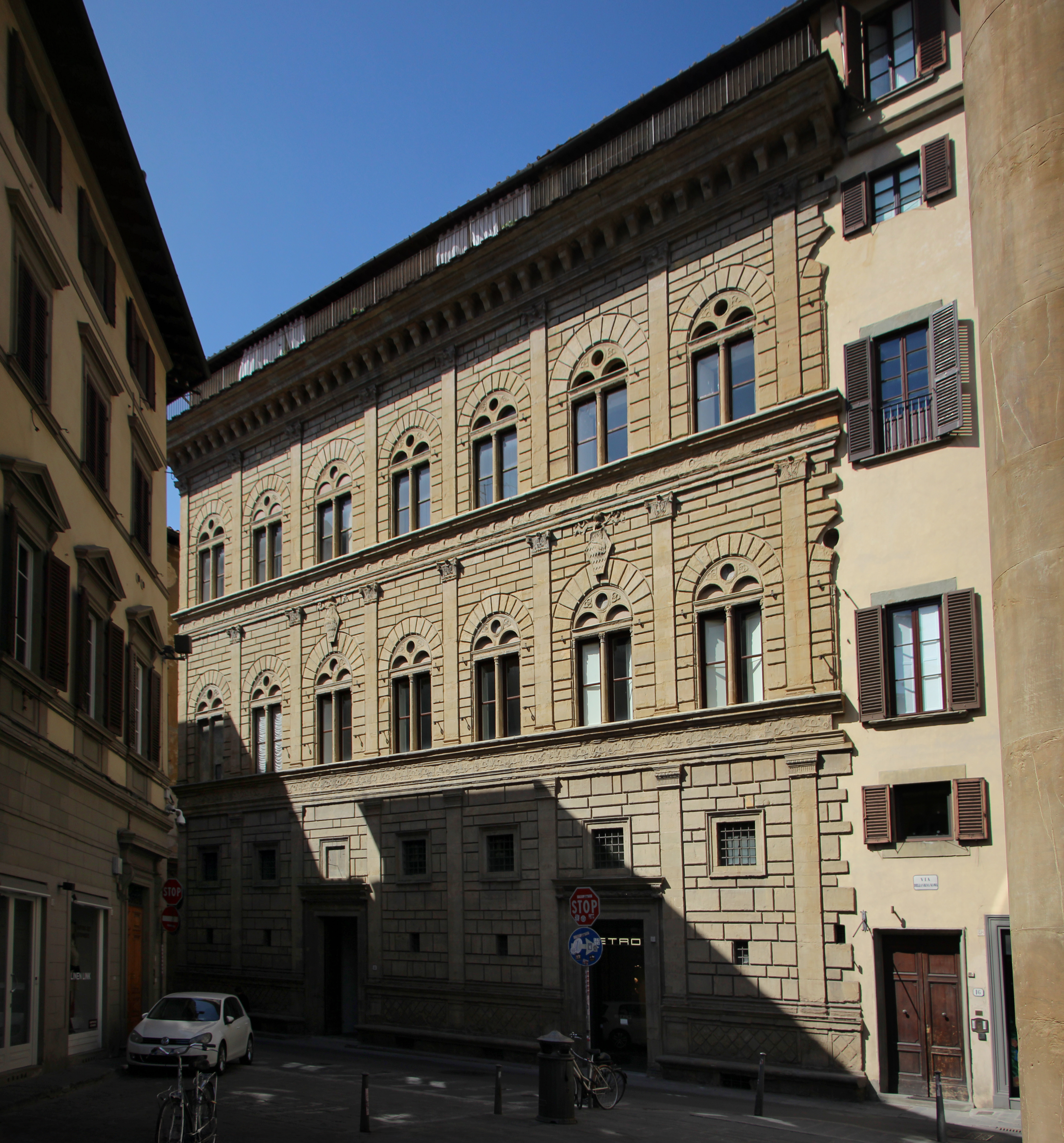
- Interactive map of the Palazzo Rucellai area

General information
- Architectural style: Renaissance architecture
- Location: Florence, Italy
- Year built: 1446–1451

Design and construction
- Architects: Leon Battista Alberti; Bernardo Rossellino
- Main contractor: Giovanni di Paolo Rucellai

Palazzo Rucellai is a palatial fifteenth-century townhouse on the Via della Vigna Nuova in Florence, Italy. The Rucellai Palace is believed by most scholars to have been designed for Giovanni di Paolo Rucellai by Leon Battista Alberti between 1446 and 1451 and executed, at least in part, by Bernardo Rossellino. Its splendid facade was one of the first to proclaim the new ideas of Renaissance architecture based on the use of pilasters and entablatures in proportional relationship to each other. The Rucellai Palace demonstrates the impact of the antique revival but does so in a manner which is full of Renaissance originality.

The grid-like facade, achieved through the application of a scheme of trabeated articulation, makes a statement of rational humanist clarity. The stone veneer of this facade is given a channeled rustication and serves as the background for the smooth-faced pilasters and entablatures which divide the facade into a series of three-story bays. The three stories of the Rucellai facade have different classical orders, as in the Colosseum, but with the Tuscan order at the base, a Renaissance original in place of the Ionic order at the second level, and a very simplified Corinthian order at the top level. Twin-lit, round-arched windows in the two upper stories are set within arches with highly pronounced voussoirs that spring from pilaster to pilaster. The facade is topped by a boldly projecting cornice.

The ground floor was for business and was flanked by benches running along the street facade. The second floor (the piano nobile) was the main formal reception floor and the third floor the private family and sleeping quarters. A fourth "hidden" floor under the roof was for servants.

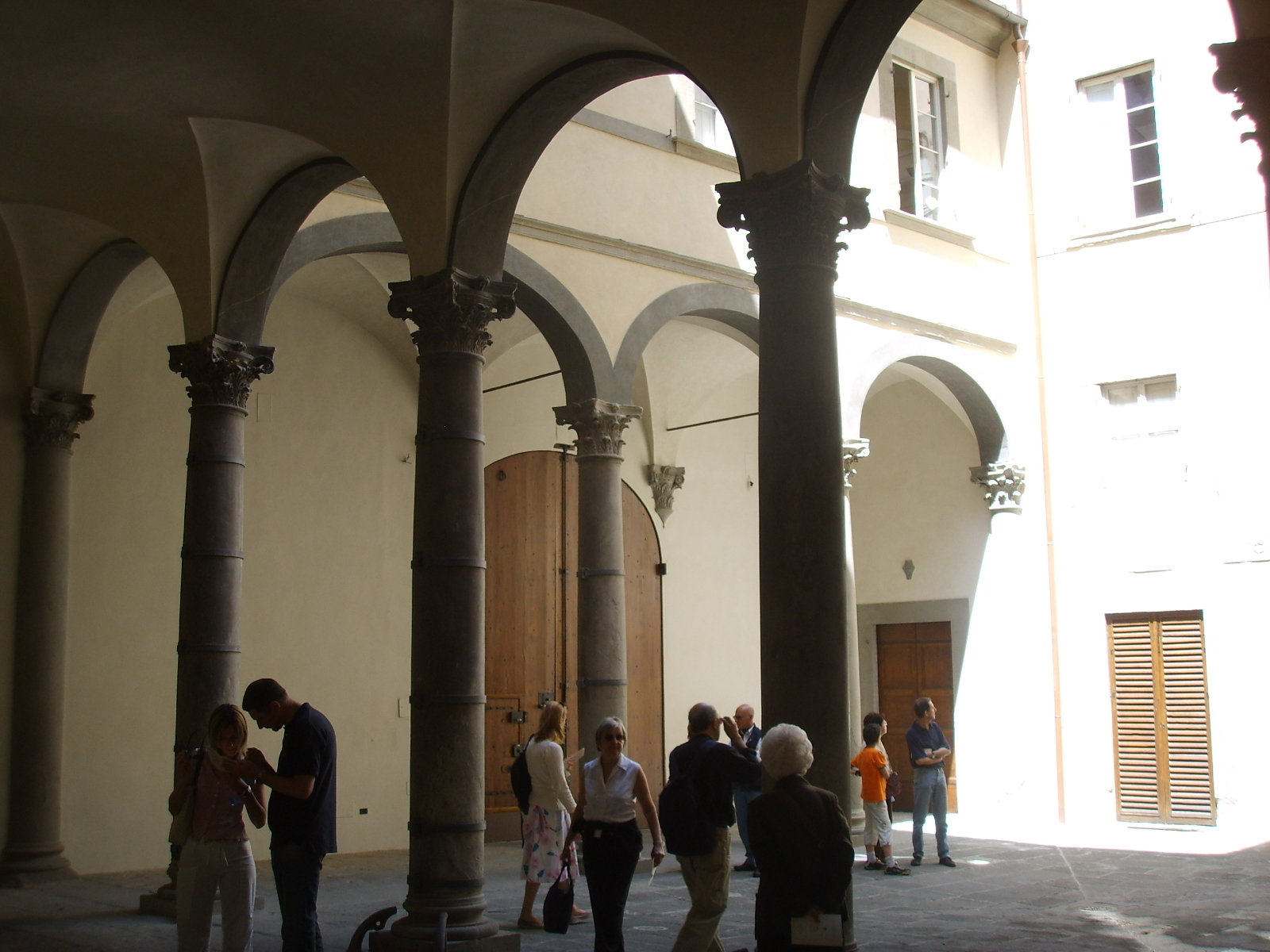
The courtyard

The palace contains an off-center court (three sides of which originally were surrounded by arcades), built to a design that may have been adapted from Brunelleschi's loggia at his Spedale degli Innocenti. In the triangular Piazza dei Rucellai in front of the palace and set at right angles to it is the Loggia de' Rucellai, which was used for family celebrations, weddings, and as a public meeting place. The two buildings (palace and loggia) taken together with the open space between them (the piazza), form one of the most refined urban compositions of the Italian Renaissance.

== Date ==
Any evaluation of the stylistic significance of the Rucellai Palace must take into account similar Florentine residences of the period, such as the Palazzo Medici Riccardi (then Palazzo de' Medici), the Palazzo Strozzino, the Palazzo Strozzi, and the Palazzo Spinelli. An accurate appraisal of the Rucellai Palace's architectural importance has been hindered by uncertainties concerning when and by whom it was constructed. Traditionally, and supported by some 16th-century sources, it has been dated to the period 1446–51, making the facades of both the Medici and Rucellai palaces contemporaries.

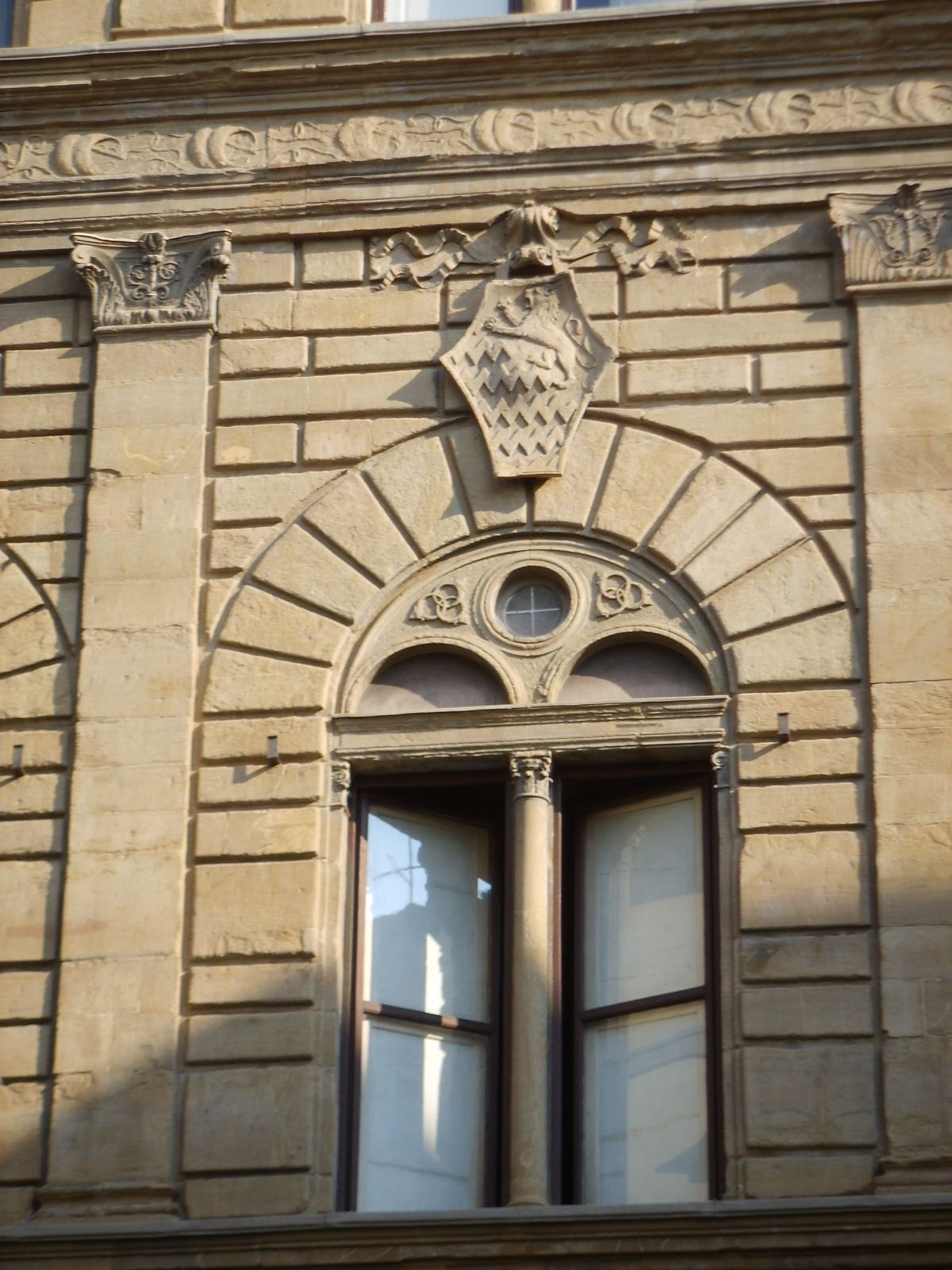
Window on the middle floor

In 1974, Charles Mack proposed a two-phase construction history for the palace based upon his interpretation of property descriptions contained in the tax declarations of Giovanni Rucellai, members of his family, and neighbors. In these tax records, the location of property is defined by naming adjacent features be they streets or neighbors. Mack, thus, was able to reconstruct ownership histories for the site now occupied by the palace for pertinent tax year. What Mack discovered substantiates Giovanni Rucellai' own testimony that "out of eight houses, I made one." Eight dwellings did, in fact, once occupy the site of the present Rucellai Palace.

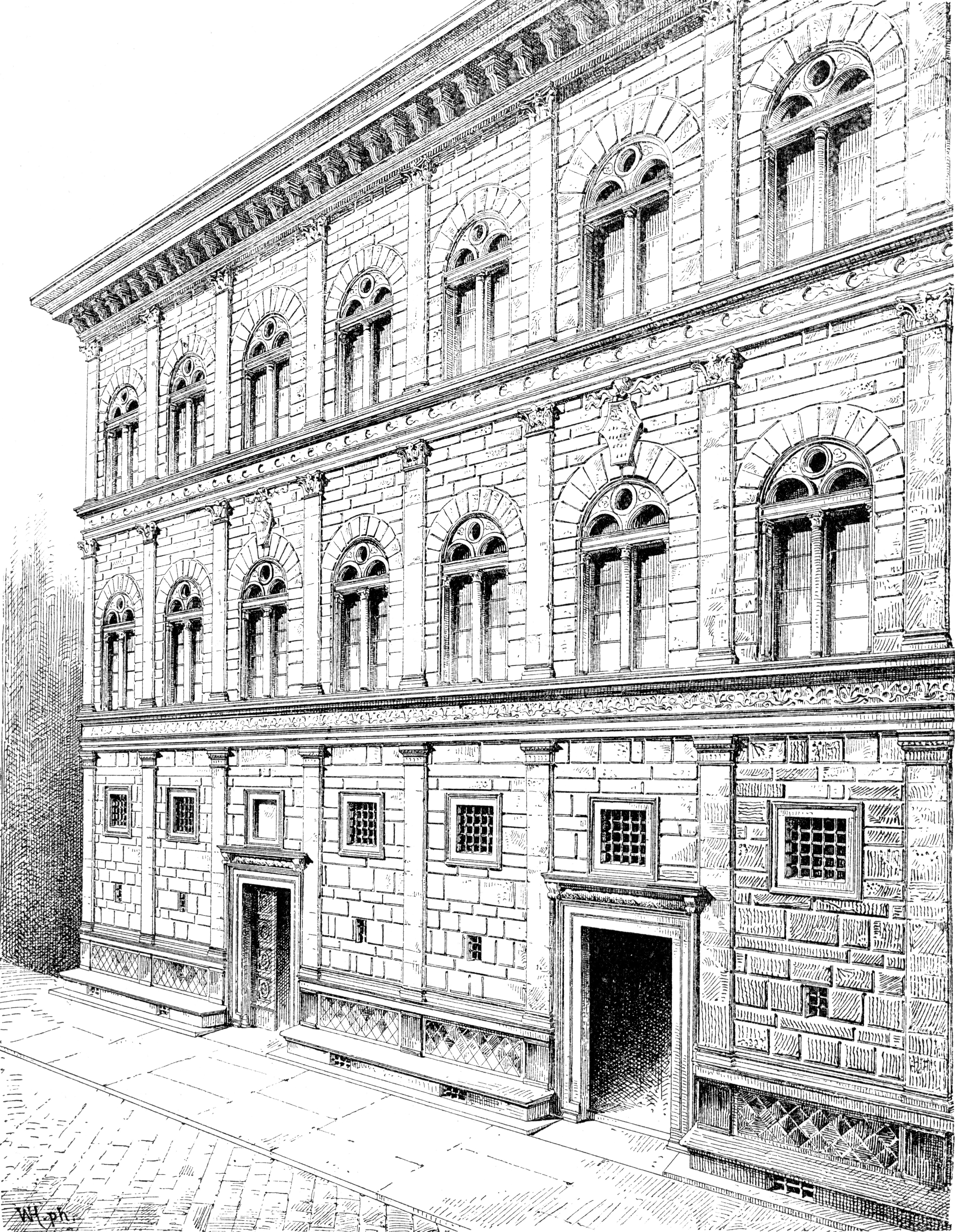
Palazzo Rucellai

Records for the tax year 1446 show that Giovanni Rucellai and his immediate family lived in a house at the corner of the Via della Vigna Nuova and the narrow Via dei Palchetti. Evidently intending to enlarge his living quarters in keeping with his growing financial and civic standing, he had acquired a row of houses along the Via dei Palchetti. Shortly thereafter, the house contiguous to his own along the Via della Vigna Nuova, owned by his mother, passed into Rucellai's hands. Finally (c. 1460), the house adjoining his mother's was added to the growing residential complex. The present internal disposition of the palace testifies to the agglutinative process by which the building evolved. By 1455 one of the Via dei Palchetti houses had been razed and replaced by a courtyard surrounded on three sides by arcades whose round arches were supported by Corinthian columns. A cross-vaulted corridor now linked the courtyard with the Via della Vigna Nuova.

Externally, the hodgepodge way in which the Rucellai Palace was created may be seen along the Via dei Palchetti. Standing in the Piazza dei Rucellai, however, the impression given by the celebrated facade is one of harmony and unity. It was to visually solidify the three separate houses along the Via della Vigna Nuova, that Rucellai sought a facade which, furthermore, would testify to his progressive taste and prominent standing within the community. Exactly when the design and execution of that historic facade took place remains uncertain. Paolo Sanpaolesi (1963), seconded by Brenda Preyer (1981), proposed a two-phase facade construction, with the first (c. 1450), equal to five bays, covering the exteriors of the old dwellings of Giovanni and his mother and then a later two bay expansion to cover the house added in 1460. That Rucellai never managed to add the next house in the row to his holdings would account for the facade remaining unfinished and one bay short of the eight intended.

Mack (1974), together with by Kurt Forster (1976) and Howard Saalman (1966) have interpreted the evidence differently, arguing that that work on the facade would have awaited the acquisition of the third property along the Via della Vigna Nuova and was stimulated by the engagement of Rucellai's son Bernardo to Piero di Cosimo de' Medici's daughter Nannina in 1461. According to this theory it could only have been after the betrothal, that the pairing of clearly identifiable Medici devices with those of the Rucellai in the friezes could have been permissible. The same is case for the Medici interlocking rings insignia that occupy the spandrels of the windows. That would postpone construction of the Rucellai facade to a date after 1461 and calls into question its primacy over the almost identical design used for the Palazzo Piccolomini (designed by Bernardo Rossellino 1459–62) in the papal city of Pienza.

== Authorship ==
That post-1461 dating raises once more the question of authorship. Based upon the word of Giorgio Vasari and some other mid-to-late-16th century comments as well as upon Giovanni Rucellai's known use of Leon Battista Alberti as the architect of his chapel in the neighboring church of San Pancrazio and for the completion of the facade of Santa Maria Novella, the great humanist scholar and artistic theoretician commonly has been accepted as having been responsible for the design of the Rucellai Palace's facade. However, the first comments on the facade, made in the early 16th century do not mention Alberti but rather link it to Bernardo Rossellino by saying that he had made the model for the palace. That might mean that he was responsible for the facade or simply that he had furnished a model following someone's directions (i.e., Alberti).

The first to doubt Alberti's role as the architect was Julius Schlosser who wrote (1929) that "It is Bernardo Rossellino's spirit and not Alberti's that is at work here." Schlosser's opinion was seconded by Leo Planiscig (1942), Howard Saalman (1966), and Mario Salmi (1967). Basing his opinion on the tax information which pointed to a later dating for the facade stage of the Rucellai project and the possible precedence of the Piccolomini Palace in Pienza, Mack argued for Bernardo Rossellino' authorship in 1974, receiving support from Forster (1976) and Marvin Trachtenberg (2000). Despite these attempts at rethinking the facade and its date, general support for Alberti remains and strong counter arguments in his favor have been made by Brenda Preyer (1981) and others. While Bernardo Rossellino's role in remodeling the interior of the palace, in constructing the entry passage, and in creating the courtyard is universally accepted, his involvement with the celebrated facade and the date it was executed remain open questions that, perhaps, will only be resolved should some new documentary evidence surface.
