= List of universities in the Dominican Republic =

This is a list of universities in the Dominican Republic.

- Charles Bekeev International University Puerto Plata Business School
- Facultad Latinoamericana de Ciencias Sociales Facultad Latinoamericana de Ciencias Sociales
- Instituto Superior de Estudios Especializados en Ciencias Sociales y Humanidades, Luis Heredia Bonetti (IES-LHB)
- Instituto Superior para la Defensa
- Instituto Tecnológico de Santo Domingo Instituto Tecnológico de Santo Domingo
- Instituto Tecnológico del Cibao Oriental Instituto Tecnológico del Cibao Oriental
- ISAL institute - first accredited online university in Dominica
- Pontificia Universidad Católica Madre y Maestra
- Stevens Institute of Technology International
- Universidad Abierta Para Adultos
- Universidad Adventista Dominicana
- Universidad Agroforestal Fernando Arturo de Meriño
- Universidad Alternativa Medicina
- Universidad APEC
- Universidad Autónoma de Santo Domingo
- Universidad Católica Nordestana
- Universidad Católica Santo Domingo
- Universidad Católica Tecnológica de Barahona
- Universidad Católica Tecnológica del Cibao
- Universidad Central del Este
- Universidad Central Dominicana de Estudios Profesionales
- Universidad de la Tercera Edad
- Universidad del Caribe
- Universidad Domínico-Americana
- Universidad Eugenio María de Hostos
- Universidad Experimental Félix Adam
- Universidad Federico Henríquez y Carvajal
- Universidad Iberoamericana
- Universidad Interamericana
- Universidad Nacional Evangélica
- Universidad Nacional Pedro Henríquez Ureña
- Universidad Nacional Tecnológica
- Universidad Odontológica Dominicana
- Universidad Organización y Método
- Universidad Psicología Industrial Dominicana
- Universidad Tecnológica de Santiago
- Universidad Tecnológica del Sur
- Universidad Ulises Francisco Espaillat

== See also ==
- List of schools in the Dominican Republic
