= List of schools in the Dominican Republic =

- Saint George School https://stgeorge.do/
- Brilliant Minds School https://bms.edu.do
- Dominica Website 1
- New Horizons Bilingual School Website 2
- Colegio Bilingue Centro de Estudios Delin www.centrodelin.com 3
- Jarabacoa Christian School (http://www.jcs.com.do/education/index.php/en/) 4
- Baby's First School Facebook 5
- St. Mary's School Website 6
- The Community for Learning school 7
- Colegio Buena Vista Website 8
- Colegio Senderos website 9
- SOS Santiago Primary School 10
- SOS Los Mina Primary School 11
- Escuela Parroquial Santa Rita 12
- Carol Morgan School 14
- SEK Las Americas 15
- Cemep 16
- Saint Michael’s School 17
- Saint Joseph School 18
- CONSA 19
- International School of Sosua 20
- Notre Dame School of Santo Domingo 21
- Colegio Arrollo Hondo 22
- Colegio Cardenal Sancha 23
- Colegio Ronda Infantil 24
- Colegio San Juan Bautista de la Salle 25
- Colegio Santa Clara 26
- Colegio Quisqueya 27
- Colegio Dominicano de La Salle 28
- Colegio Cristiano Ministerios Be-tel 29
- Americas Bicultural School (ABC) 30
- Colegio Serafin de Asis 31
- Colegio del Apostolado Website 32
- Colegio Baby Care Center Tia Ury 33
- Colegio Mi Colegio 34
- Colegio Loyola de Santo Domingo 35
- MI-EL Christian School 36
- Colegio San Judas Tadeo 37
- Colegio Pre-Universitario Lux Mundi 38
- Colegio Babeque Secundaria Website 39
- Colegio Bilingue Nuevo Horisons/Grazyna School 40
- Saint Thomas School 41
- Saint Patrick School 42
- Centro Educativo los Prados (CELP) Website 43
- Centro Educativo Amador 44
- Colegio Santo Domingo 45
- The Ashton School 46
- Colegio Calasanz 47
- King's Christian School 48
- Colegio Domínico-Americano 49
- American School of Santo Domingo 50
- Instituto Montessori 51
- Colegio San Rafael 52
- The Cathedral School of Santo Domingo Website 53
- Centro De Formacion Don Mattt 54
- La Vega Christian School (www.lavegachristianschool.com) 55
- Colegio Peces Centro Montessori 56
- Colegio Cristiano Genesis 57
- Doulos Discovery School Facebook 58
- American Christian School (Dominican Republic) 59
- Instituto Técnico Salesiano (ITESA) 60
- O&M Hostos School of (Puerto Plata) Website 61
- Colegio Taller Victoria Montás (CTVM) 62
- St.Martin primary school (big section)
- St.Martin primary school (small section)
- S.M.P school

== The Do ==
- American School of Santo Domingo
- Lycée Français de Saint Domingue (French school)
- Colegio Cristiano Adonai
