= Education in Latin America =

Despite significant progress, education remains a challenge in Latin America. The region has made great progress in educational coverage; almost all children attend primary school and access to secondary education has increased considerably. Children complete on average two more years of schooling than their parents' generation. Most educational systems in the region have implemented various types of administrative and institutional reforms that have enabled reach for places and communities that had no access to education services in the early 90s.

However, there are still 23 million children in the region between the ages of 4 and 17 outside of the formal education system. Estimates indicate that 30% of preschool age children (ages 4 –5) do not attend school, and for the most vulnerable populations – poor, rural, indigenous and afro-descendants – this calculation exceeds 40 percent. Among primary school age children (ages 6 to 12), coverage is almost universal; however there is still a need to incorporate 5 million children in the primary education system. These children live mostly in remote areas, are indigenous or Afro-descendants and live in extreme poverty.

Among people between the ages of 13 and 17 years, only 80% are enrolled in the education system; among those, only 66% attend secondary school. The remaining 14% are still attending primary school. These percentages are higher among vulnerable population groups: 75% of the poorest youth between the ages of 13 and 17 years attend school. Tertiary education has the lowest coverage, with only 70% of people between the ages of 18 and 25 years outside of the education system. Currently, more than half of low income children or people living in rural areas fail to complete nine years of education.

== Retention and completion ==
Distribution of youth by schooling condition and educational attainment in Latin American countries

In Mexico, access to education has increased with 87% of the population today completing their primary schooling compared to 46.6% in 1980. The countries of the region show wide differences in their averages and gaps in completion rates, especially at the secondary level. While on average 55% of youth in the region complete the first cycle of secondary education, in countries such as Guatemala and Nicaragua this estimation falls to 30%. In Chile, it approaches 80%. Desertion is also a challenge for Latin America. According to Inter-American Development Bank studies, 20% of students enter primary school with one or more lagging years. During this cycle, about 10% repeat 1st and 2nd grade, and 8% repeat grades 3 and 4. Only 40% of children enter secondary school at the expected age. At the secondary level, approximately 10% of youth in each grade level repeat their grade. On average, a child who attends 7.2 years of school completes only 6 years of education (primary), while a person attending 12 years of school only completes 9 years of education (high school). By the age of 18, only 1 in every 6 rural men and women are still in school. Therefore, only a small number or poor rural youth have the chance to attend a university.

A study published by the Inter-American Development Bank also revealed that school dropout rates in Latin America can be significantly reduced by improving the quality of school's infrastructure, such as access to clean water and electricity. The study shows that, in Brazil, a universalization program focused on providing electricity to rural and indigenous schools (Light for All), reduced 27% the dropout rates of schools treated by the program when compared to schools without electricity.

School-based feeding programs are widely used in Latin America to improve access to education, and at least 23 countries in Latin America and the Caribbean region have some large-scale school feeding activity. Altogether, 55% of school-age children (and 88% of primary school-age children) in the region benefit from school meal programs. This is the highest rate of school feeding coverage seen in any region of the world.

In El Salvador, a reform known as the EDUCO (Educación y Cooperación Para el Desarrollo) system has been implemented by the El Salvadorian government with the support of the World Bank and the United Nations Educational, Scientific and Cultural Organization. This system was put in place to improve retention rates and student outcomes. EDUCO is a form of community-managed schools, in which the community is in charge of school administration, including the hiring and firing of teachers and decisions such as how long the students go to school for and for how many days. A study conducted from 1996 to 1998 found that students in EDUCO schools were 5% more likely to continue their education than those in traditional schools and that weekly visits by the community and parent organizations that run the schools increased probability of school retention by 19%.

== Education inputs ==
The 2007 Teacher Evaluation Census in Peru and Chilean Teacher Evaluation System (DocenteMás), indicated that teacher quality in the region is very low. Other education inputs and services are equally inadequate. School infrastructure and access to basic services such as water, electricity, telecommunications and sewage systems are very poor in many Latin American schools. Approximately 40% of elementary schools lack libraries, 88% lack science labs, 63% lack a meeting space for teachers, 65% lack computer rooms, and 35% lack a gymnasium. On the other hand, 21% of schools have no access to potable water, 40% lack a drainage system, 53% lack phone lines, 32% have an inadequate number of bathrooms, and 11% have no access to electricity. The conditions of schools that hold students from the poorest quintile are highly unsuitable: approximately 50% have electricity and water, 19% have a drainage system and 4% have access to a telephone line; almost none have science labs, gymnasiums, computer rooms, and only 42% have libraries. Additionally, students who migrate to cities from rural areas generally live cheaply on the periphery of urban centers where they have little to no access to public services.

Few schools can count on education inputs like textbooks and educational technologies. Second Regional Comparative and Explanatory Study (SERCE) data indicate that, on average, 3rd and 6th grade students have access to only three books per student in the school library. Students from lower socioeconomic status have access to an average of one book per student, while students from higher socioeconomic status have access to eight books per student. A school's location is a high determinant of the number of books that a student will have, benefitting urban schools over rural schools. With regards to educational technologies, while there has been an increase in Information and Communication Technology (ICT) access for Latin American children and adolescents in the last decade, along with a widespread interest in One-to-One (1–1) computing models in the past 4 years, its access and use is still too limited to produce sufficient changes in the educational practices of teachers and students. Students in the region are reaching a rate of 100 students per computer, indicating that each student has access to a few minutes of computer time a week.

The majority of Latin American countries have a shorter school year than Organisation for Economic Co-operation and Development (OECD) countries: while the school year in Japan lasts 240 days, it lasts 180 days in Argentina and only 125 days in Honduras. Furthermore, the average instruction time in the region is also short: two thirds of students in the region have less than 20 hours of instruction time per week (on average only 10% of Latin American students at the primary level attend school full-time). Student and teacher absence rates in the region are also high.

== Learning ==
The results of the Second Regional Comparative and Explanatory Study (SERCE) indicate that almost two-thirds of Latin American students do not achieve satisfactory reading and math scores. There is a significant learning gap between students from different socio-economic backgrounds, those who live in rural areas and those who belong to indigenous and Afro-descendant groups. Research shows that a 3rd-grade student from the poorest fifth of students has a 12% chance of achieving a satisfactory reading score, while a student from the wealthiest fifth has a 56% chance of doing so. In mathematics, the probability differs between 10% and 48%. From 2000 to 2012 the Program for International Student Assessment (PISA) tracked test scores on international math tests among 15 years, and revealed that several Latin American countries had mixed or declining trends over time, with Brazil and Chile being the only positive trending countries.

Data from surveys conducted to employers in Argentina, Brazil and Chile developed by the Inter-American Development Bank (IDB) show that a significant proportion of employers face difficulties in finding workers with relevant skills for good job performance, especially behavioral skills.

== PISA ==
The 2009 Program for International Student Assessment (PISA) results reveal that countries in the region have a low performance and high inequality level compared with other countries. 48% of Latin American students have difficulty performing rudimentary reading tasks and do not have the essential skills needed to participate effectively and productively in society (not achieving level 2), as measured by the 2009 PISA Assessment, compared with only 18% of students in Organisation for Economic Co-operation and Development (OECD) countries. This percentage is even more pronounced for low-income students in the region, where 62% do not demonstrate these essential skills.

According to the Inter-American Development Bank's (IDB) analysis of the 2009 PISA Results, Chile, Colombia and Peru are among the countries that displayed the largest advancements when compared to previous versions of the test. Despite this, countries in the region are ranked among the lowest performing countries. Chile, which achieved the best reading scores at the regional level, is ranked number 44 out of 65 while Panama and Peru are located at numbers 62 and 63, respectively. The poor performance of Latin American students is also evident when compared to countries of similar income levels. The gap between the results obtained by the countries in the region and the Organisation for Economic Co-operation and Development (OECD) (excluding Mexico and Chile) is enhanced when taking into account the level of income per capita of the countries in the sample. Latin America received systematically worse results than what their level of per capita income or expenditure on education would predict.

== School bullying ==
=== Central America ===
According to consistent PISA data collected in 2015 in Costa Rica and Mexico, globally, the Central America sub-region has the lowest prevalence of bullying, at 22.8% (range 19%–31.6%) and there is little difference in bullying prevalence between the sexes.

Sexual bullying is the most frequent type of bullying for both boys (15.3%) and girls (10.8%). Physical bullying is the second most frequent type of bullying for boys (13.3%) and psychological bullying is the second most frequent type of bullying for girls (8.2%).

Girls are far less likely to report physical bullying (4.5%) than boys. Overall, students in Central America report a higher prevalence of psychological bullying than the global median of 5.5%.

Data from the Third Regional Comparative and Explanatory Study (TERCE), conducted in 2013 in four countries in the sub-region, show that students report more psychological bullying than physical bullying.

Physical appearance is reported to be the main driver for bullying by both boys (14.2%) and girls (24.2%), although the proportion of girls reporting this is far higher. Boys (11.2%) are more likely than girls (8.4%) to report that bullying is related to race, nationality or colour, while girls (4.8%) are more likely than boys (2.2%) to report that bullying is related to religion.

The prevalence of physical violence in schools in Central America is low compared to other regions. The overall prevalence of physical fights, at 25.6% is the second lowest of all regions – only Asia has a lower prevalence. Central America also has the lowest proportion of students reporting being involved in a physical fight four or more times in the past year (4.9%).

There is a significant difference in prevalence between the sexes. Boys (33.9%) are twice as likely to report involvement in a physical fight as girls (16.9%). The overall prevalence of physical attacks in schools in Central America, at 20.5%, is the lowest of any region. The difference between the sexes is less significant than for physical fights, with boys reporting only a slightly higher prevalence of physical attacks (21.7%) than girls (18%). In terms of trends, Central America has seen an overall decrease in bullying in schools.

=== South America ===
The prevalence of bullying in South America, at 30.2% (range 15.1%–47.4%), is slightly lower than the global median of 32%. The prevalence of bullying is similar in boys (31.7%) and girls (29.3%). Data collected through PISA in 2015 in five countries in the sub-region reveal a lower prevalence of bullying, ranging from 16.9% in Uruguay to 22.1% in Colombia.

Physical bullying is the most frequent type of bullying reported by boys who have been bullied (13.6%), followed by sexual bullying (10.8%), and psychological bullying (5.6%). The situation is different for girls. Sexual bullying (9.4%) and psychological bullying (9.4%) are the most frequent types of bullying reported by girls who have been bullied, followed by physical bullying (5.4%).

Students in South America report a higher prevalence of psychological bullying than the global median of 5.5%.

The Third Regional Comparative and Explanatory Study (TERCE), 2013 data from eight countries in the sub-region show that students report more psychological bullying than physical bullying.

The most frequent driver of bullying is physical appearance. Differences between the sexes are small, with 14% of boys and 15.8% of girls reporting that they were bullied because of their physical appearance.

Boys (8.4%) are more likely than girls (5.6%) to report that bullying is related to race, nationality or colour. Only 3.7% of boys and 3.9% of girls report that it is related to their religion.

The overall prevalence of physical fights, at 31.3% (range 20.2%–39.4%), is below the global median of 36%, but this masks significant differences between the sexes. The prevalence of being involved in a physical fight is 45.3% among boys compared with 20.8% among girls. The overall prevalence of physical attacks, at 25.6%, is below the global median of 31.4%, and is the second lowest prevalence of any region. South America has an overall decrease in bullying in schools. Only one country, Uruguay, has shown a significant decline in bullying, physical fights and physical attacks.

== Education and growth ==
When regions of the world are compared in terms of long run economic growth, Latin America ranks at the bottom along with Sub-Saharan Africa. This slow growth has been a puzzle, because education and human capital is frequently identified as an important element of growth. Yet, the relatively good performance of Latin America in terms of access and school attainment has not translated into good economic outcomes. Economic inequality was decreasing during the 20th century, while it was still extremely high during the first phase of globalization in the 18th and 19th century. For these reasons, many economists have argued that other factors such as economic institutions or financial crises must be responsible for the poor growth, and they have generally ignored any role for education in Latin American countries. On the other hand, Eric Hanushek and Ludger Woessmann argue that the slow growth is directly related to the low achievement and poor learning that comes with each year of school in Latin America. Their analysis suggests that the long run growth of Latin America would improve significantly if the learning in schools were to improve.

== Primary and secondary education ==
Primary education is compulsory throughout the region. The first phase of secondary education – or lower secondary according to UNESCO's International Standard Classification of Education (ISCED) – is compulsory in all Latin American countries except in Nicaragua, while the final phase of secondary education (i.e. upper secondary) is compulsory in 12 of the 19 Latin American countries.

At present, it is expected that all individuals gain access to and remain within the education system at least until completion of the secondary level. However, during the first years of the 2010s, there was a schooling deficit – understood as the gap observed between the theoretical and the actual school trajectory – corresponding to 2.5% among children aged 9 to 11 years; 21% among adolescents aged 15 to 17 years; 37% among youth aged 21 to 23 years; and around 46% among adults aged 31 to 33 years.

Indeed, data show that 2.5% of boys and girls aged 9 to 11 years never entered the primary level or, in any case, do not attend school, with no considerable Gender Differences. In rural areas, this proportion is even higher. Yet, the biggest divide is associated with socio-economic levels, where the lack of schooling impacts the most underprivileged sectors hardest. The situation is most critical in Nicaragua, where this proportion rises to 8% and in Guatemala and Honduras, where more than 4% of the boys and girls are out of school.

== Higher education ==
=== Overview ===
Higher Education in Latin America has grown over the past forty years to comprise more than 3,000 higher education institutions. Out of 17 million students in higher education, Brazil, Mexico and Argentina account for 10 million. Access to higher education in Latin America shows a massive gap when it comes to income distribution in many Latin American countries. Although higher education is not new to the region; indeed, many institutions date back hundreds of years, but the noticeable growth spurt in the area of higher education has been more recent. Latin Americans value higher education in general, according to the Applicant survey of 2016/2017.

The past four decades have been a time of tremendous change and growth for higher education in the region. Institutional growth has resulted in a diversification of degrees offered to include more graduate degrees (Master's degrees, professional degrees and doctorates) and less traditional areas of study. This increase in graduate degrees has presented challenges related to funding, especially in the public sector of education. Budgetary limitations in the late 20th century saw a surge of private universities in many Latin American countries. These universities sprung up all over the region during the time period and continue to serve a particular subset of the population. In general, Latin America is still subject to a developmental lag when it comes to education, and higher education in particular. The country of Brazil is the main exception to this "developmental lag". Brazil boasts many of the top universities in Latin America, in some of the country's richest areas.

Low amounts of money are invested into research and development in the region. This creates a lack of competition with other areas of the world and results in less innovation coming from the region.

=== History ===
==== Colonial Period ====
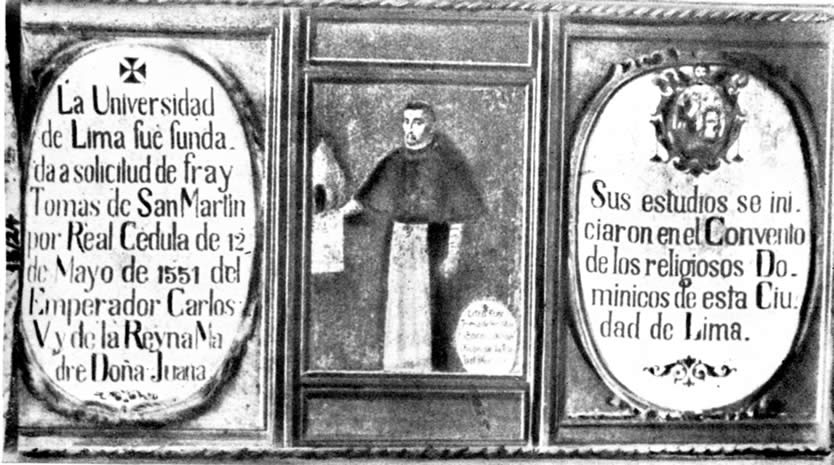
Oil painting commemorating the foundation of the University of Lima (later named San Marcos), officially the first university in Peru and the Americas, and his manager Friar Tomas of San Martin

Colonization was of great significance to the course of higher education in Latin America, and the spirit of the colonial period was interwoven in the Church. "In the 1800s, numerous countries, including Chile, Ecuador, and Colombia, signed contracts with the Catholic Church, or modeled their constitution on Catholic values, declaring themselves Catholic states." As Spanish Christianity was reformed in the 16th century by Cardinal Jiménez de Cisneros, the Church was more under Crown control in Spain than any other European monarchy.

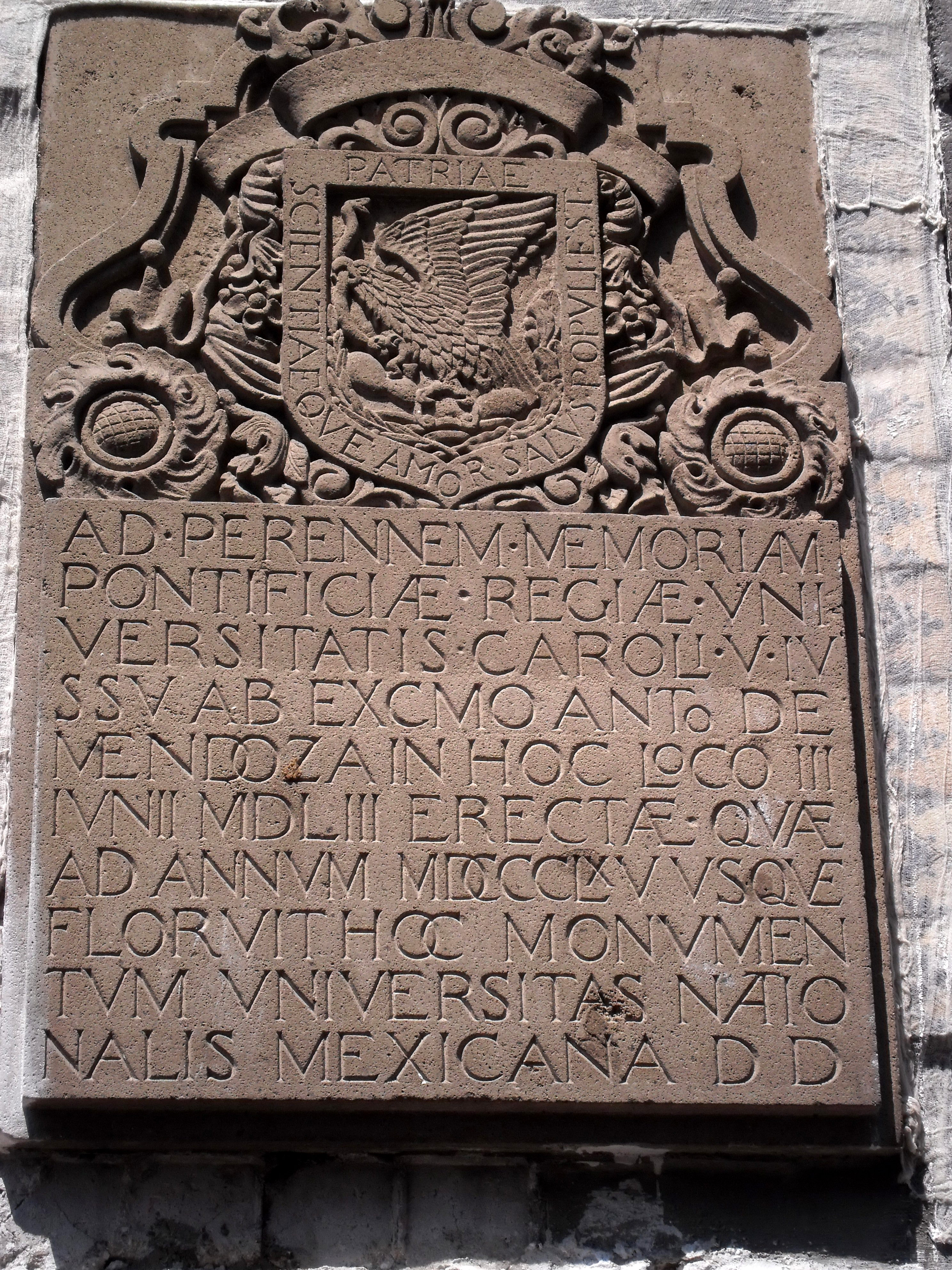
Plaque relative to the Royal and Pontifical University of Mexico. Latin: "Ad Perennem Memoriam Pontifical Regiae Universitatis Caroli V Ivssv AB ExcMo [Excellency] ENTO [NIO] de Mendoza In Hoc Crazy III [3] IUNII MDCCCLXV VSQVE FLORVIT HOC MONVMENTVM Universitas Nationalis Mexican. DD [Dedicavit or dedit Dedicavit] ". English: To perpetuate the memory of the Royal University and Pontifical University of Carlos V. By order of the Excellency Antonio de Mendoza, in this place was erected on June 3, 1553. Who until year 1865 here flourished. Monument to the National Mexican University. He has given the dedication.

Higher education in Latin America was heavily affected by the relationship between Church and State. "Spanish America's universities were created to serve the Church and state simultaneously. They often functioned by the authority of papal bulls and royal charters. The first to receive the papal bull was the Dominican Republic's University of Santo Domingo (1538). First to receive the royal authorization was Peru's University of San Marcos (1551). And considered to be the first founded in North America, is the Royal and Pontifical University of Mexico (1551). The offerings of the three institutions were similar, including law, medicine, and economics, etc. "Spain enjoyed great success in transplanting its institutions and culture. These universities (Santo Domingo, San Marcos, and the Royal Pontifical) had state support but money was always a problem. The entering fees were small but rose the longer one stayed. This favored the rich upper class". Entitlement and access to education continued to be an issue throughout the history of higher education in Latin America. From a global perspective on the inception of the university, the oldest existing, and continually operating educational institution in the world is the University of Karueein, founded in 859 AD in Morocco, the University of Bologna, Italy, was founded in 1088, and England's University of Oxford was founded in 1167.

Initially, the Church and State in Latin America granted authority to universities, and the position of maestrescuela was filled by one who served as a liaison among stakeholders. "Most of the universities were organized by religious orders, especially Jesuits and Dominicans, and these orders provided not only most of the administrators but also most of the teachers…Graduation was a religious as well as an academic event"; many students were trained to enter the clergy or to take on bureaucratic positions for the state.

==== Early Post-colonial Period ====
At the time of the Spanish American wars of independence, approximately twenty-five universities were operating in Spanish America. These universities, influenced by the French Enlightenment, came to be regulated by government rather than cooperative interests or the Church. Growth and expansion of the university system was slowed due to political and financial instability; university life was regularly interrupted. In the 1840s Chile and Uruguay implemented an educational model that incorporated centralized Napoleonic lines which promoted the "base education for the future leaders of the nation, as well as members of the bureaucracy and the military". In the time of post-colonialism, "[Gregorio Weinberg] defined three successive stages up until the twentieth century: "imposed culture", "accepted culture" and "criticized or disputed culture". The phase of 'imposed culture', which was of a functional nature for the metropolis, corresponds to the colonial era, while the second phase, that of the "accepted culture", is associated with the organisation of the national societies... [and the] assimilation of foreign cultural and philosophical tendencies by Latin American countries, which adopted them due to their usefulness for solving the theoretical and practical problems involved in organizing the new nations."

The export-led economic growth of the 19th and 20th centuries allowed for the increased availability of resources and urbanization, and together with the spirit of competition of the political elite, drove university expansion. Ultimately, control over university leadership, faculty, curriculum, and admissions led to the separation of state controlled and funded institutions from those which were privately run. "Social demand, however, was not the only cause of the proliferation of universities. To provide educational opportunity for working class youth who held jobs during the day, night schools run for profit were established by enterprising educators. Some universities were started because many traditional institutions remained unresponsive to national needs for new kinds of training. But, by far the most important added stimulus can be traced to the lack of criteria for the accreditation of new programs and institutions." Conflicts of power between liberals and conservatives and the promotion or opposition of secularism fueled the growth of separate public and private universities. The "philosophy of positivism powerfully reinforced the notion that scientific progress was inherently incompatible with religious interference". The State's power and control continued to increase to the point that "the universities of Costa Rica, Guatemala, Honduras, and Nicaragua all held State monopolies on the authority to grant academic degrees and professional licenses". An additional hurdle for education to overcome was the fact that "the early development of mass educational systems in Latin America reflected inequalities in the distribution of wealth, income, and opportunities that became barriers to the universalization of mandatory schooling. The gap between regions and between rural and urban areas within each country, strongly associated with those between social classes and ethnic groups, was not reduced through centralized educational policies that typically resulted in greater subsidies to the more advantaged groups".

==== Student Movements in the 20th Century ====
University enrollment exclusiveness in favor of the wealthy began to change with rapidly increasing enrollment rates credited by Latin America's population and economic growth. The University Reform Movement (UFM) in Argentina, or Movimiento de la Reforma Universitaria "emerged as a revolution ‘from below’ and ‘from inside’ against the ancien re´gime of a very old type of university". "The widening political gap between the autonomous public universities and democratically elected governments was made more critical by a radicalized student activism in the Cold War climate of the latter half of the 20th century. The most visible confrontations took place in the late 1960s, a time of student mobilization worldwide. These protests were very frequent throughout the period in most countries in Latin America, reinforcing the image of a politically involved student movement, even if it was often fostered by the mobilization of a minority of student activists with representation in university governance and closely linked to national political movements and parties. In many cases, student confrontations with the authorities mixed radical demands for revolutionary change with more limited demands for organizational transformation and more generous funding". Argentina, for example, had an increasingly robust middle class population which demanded access to university education. Argentina's university system quickly expanded with the demand. "Contemporary analysts have estimated that roughly 85 to 90 percent of Latin America's university students come from the middle class". That growth and prosperity of Argentina's middle class along with electoral rights, an increased migration to urban areas, and the universal suffrage law of 1912 empowered students to challenge conservative systems and voice their demands. In December 1917, the University of Córdoba refused to concede to student demands for the university meet a perceived need. Students responded by organizing a mass protest; they refused to attend classes and hosted a demonstration on school grounds. They magnified the power of the student voice by including local politicians, labor groups, and student organizations. The primary goals of the student movement were to "secularize and democratize Córdoba University by expanding student and professor participation in its administration and modernizing the curricula", and to make university education "available and affordable by lifting entrance restrictions and establishing greater flexibility in attendance and examinations to accommodate low and middle-income students with work obligations". Students did not receive a response for nearly a year. "The university reform movement in Argentina influenced university reform campaigns in Uruguay, Chile, and Peru, among others".

Student involvement has been credited with marked increased attention to and participation in politics as well as a redistribution of power on campus, however this was not always the case. A slowly changing system, students were met with a number of setbacks. "Some reforms... reduced student and professorial authority, giving it instead to administrators or even to the State". In the case of Colombian students, the example of Argentina was nontransferable. "Unable to unify themselves, overly concerned with broad political issues, and the 'unholy alliance' of foreign imperialists and local oligarchs, Colombian students never won access to legitimate and effective means of influencing university policy." The struggle for control of power within higher education has continued, however a number of reforms have attempted to address the problems. Examples of reforms in Colombia included following the North American Land Grant model, administrative reforms designed to target spending and asset waste, and employing more full-time professors. The university systems have been criticized for reflecting the culture in which they are set as opposed to strategically guiding culture through the pursuit of intellectual ideals and educational and vocational advancement. Having come through a period of reform trial and error, "several Latin societies have already embarked on radical political paths and others exhibit willingness to explore novel alternatives." Moving into the future, Latin America will continue to develop their higher education programs to increase academic and social success through increased availability to all people.

=== Institutions in Latin American higher education ===
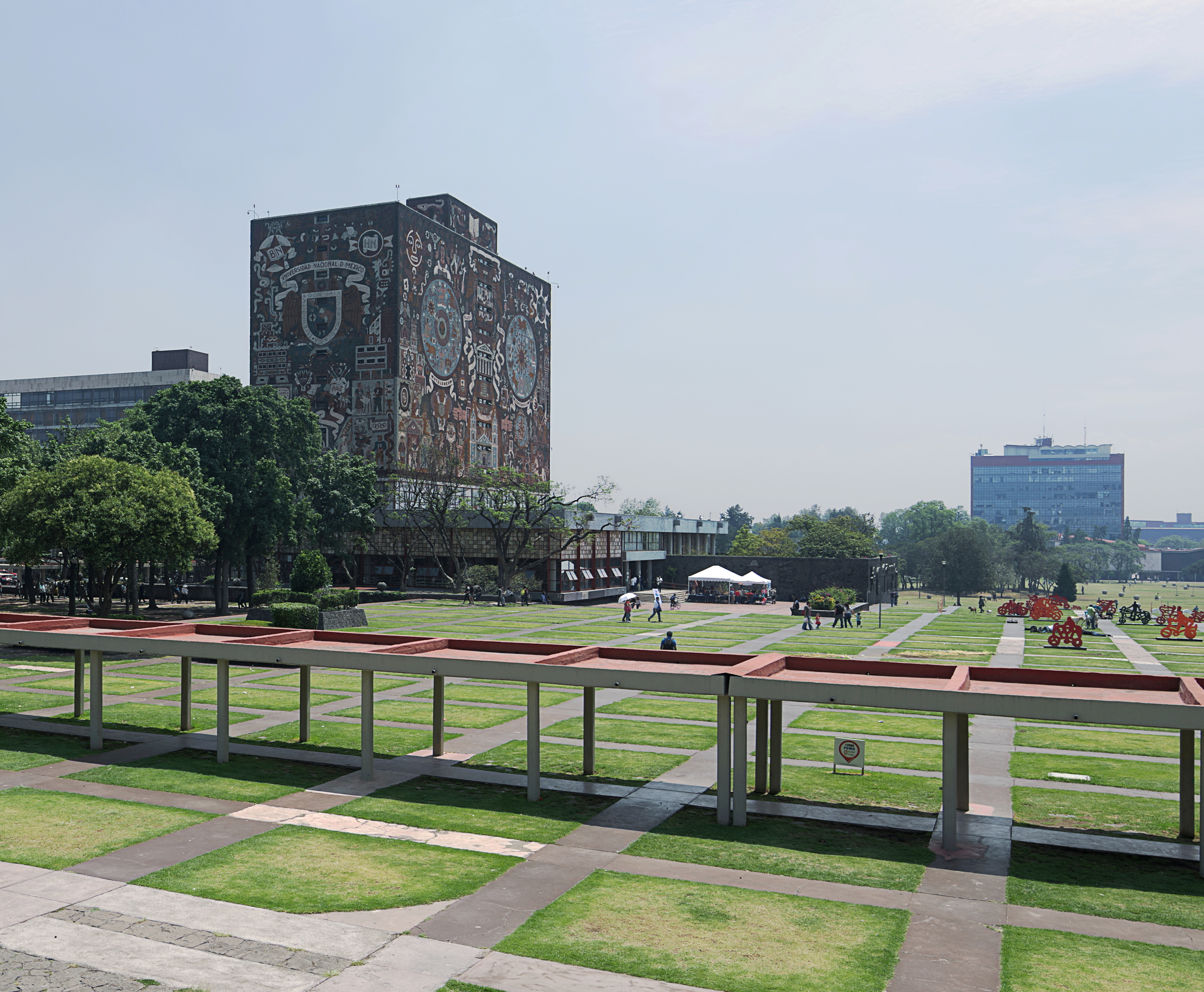
Central University City Campus of the Universidad Nacional Autónoma de México (UNAM) (Mexico City), inscribed on UNESCO's World Heritage List.

According to The Economist, "Latin America boasts some giant universities and a few venerable ones: the University of Buenos Aires (UBA) and the National Autonomous University of Mexico (UNAM) enroll several hundred thousand students apiece, while Lima's San Marcos was founded in 1551. Even so, the region is hardly synonymous with excellence in higher education. Research output is unimpressive, teaching techniques are old-fashioned and students drop out in droves. These failings matter. Faster economic growth is driving a big rise in demand for higher education in the region and a large crop of new universities". The Economist article lists the 2011 rankings of higher education institutions in Latin America. The article states, "Of the 200 top universities, 65 are in Brazil, 35 in Mexico, 25 apiece in Argentina and Chile and 20 in Colombia. The University of São Paulo (USP), the richest and biggest university in Brazil's richest state, came top".

Higher education institutions in Latin America are private, public and federal colleges and universities. Most experts agree that there is no typical Latin American university as the universities must reflect the vast differences found within each country and region within Latin America. Most Latin American countries started from a European model (mostly modeled after the French or Spanish) and have adopted their own educational models differently in each region. Most models appeared to be Napoleonic which has historically been vocationally oriented and nationalistic in nature. Even now, students pursuing higher education in Latin America are asked to find a field of study and adhere to the prescribed major path within their college or university. Latin America is facing many issues in the ever-expanding era of globalization. Their enrollments and their students must be prepared to participate in a more globalized world than ever before and they must have the institutions to support a more international mission. Scholars believe that there is tension among countries that defined modernity differently. Modernity within education will allow for progress with educational policy and research and particularly in comparative education. Defining modernity differently in each country does not allow for consensus on what a modern educational system could and should look like.

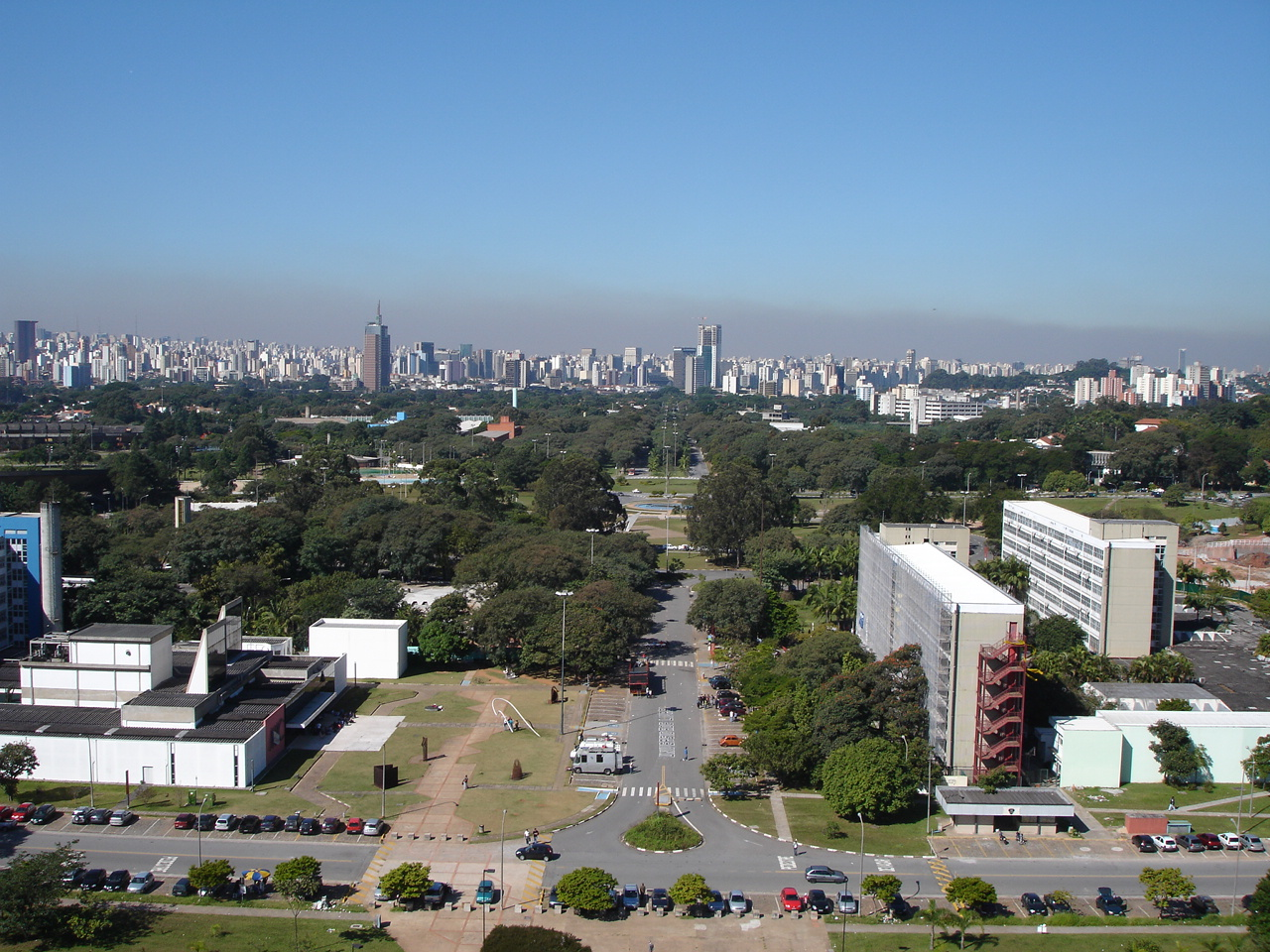
University of São Paulo seen from Torre do Relógio, São Paulo.

Argentina, Brazil, Chile, Colombia, Cuba, Mexico and Peru represent about 90 percent of the Latin American region's population. It's important to acknowledge that higher education in Latin America really only reflects on the elite few Latin American countries that can and do offer higher education options for their citizens. More research must be done in this area to bolster the information on some of the smaller countries in parts of Latin America that do not have higher education options. Or who do have higher education options but are limited in number and scope. In a 2002 publication on higher education institutions in Latin American and Caribbean Universities, including Argentina, Bolivia, Chile, Colombia, Costa Rica, Cuba, Ecuador, El Salvador, Guatemala, Honduras, Nicaragua, Panama, Uruguay, Venezuela, Mexico, Peru, Brazil and the Dominican Republic, 1,917 of them were considered private universities. In some countries, such as Brazil, there are state and federal higher education institutions in each state. Federal universities in Brazil make up an enrollment of 600,000 student in 99 institutions throughout the country. More information on higher education specific to Brazil can be found here: Brazil.

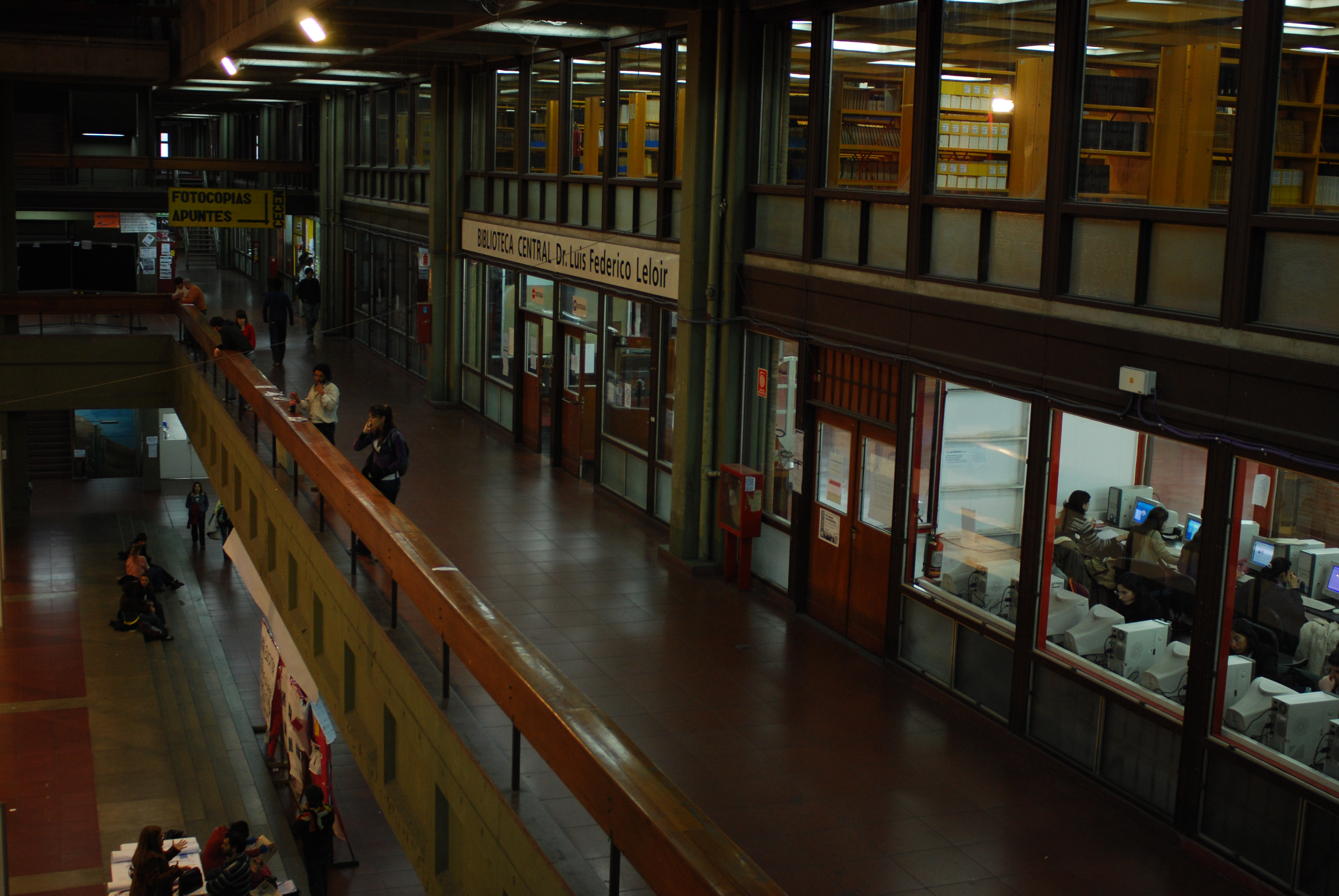
University City of Buenos Aires (Argentina). September 2008.

Alternatively, 1,023 universities are considered public in Argentina, Brazil, Chile, Colombia, Cuba, Mexico and Peru. There are about 5,816 institutes that are considered private or public and even some were not deemed identifiable. Of both regions, Latin America and the Caribbean, there are nearly 14 million students enrolled in some type of higher education institution. Roughly 13,896,522 students are enrolled at institutions in Latin American where not quite 95,000 are enrolled in the Caribbean. Participation in higher education has seen an increase in enrollment from 1998 to 2001. In developed countries, the gross enrollment rate jumped from 45.6% to 54.6% in 2001. Additionally, female participation in enrollment jumped from 59.2% in 1998 to 64.3% in 2001. (unEsCo, 2005). Transitional and developing countries also saw a jump in gross enrollment rates from 1998 to 2001. Of the Latin American countries analyzed, Brazil, Mexico and Argentina had the highest distribution of enrollments. These top three countries accounted for about 60% of total enrollment in higher education. Brazil led the Latin American countries by holding 28% of higher education enrollment in all of Latin America. Shortly behind Brazil is Mexico with 17% of the total enrollment and Argentina at 14%.

Sets of countries also distribute their enrollment among private and public universities differently as well. For example, Brazil, Chile, El Salvador, Colombia, Costa Rica, Nicaragua and the Dominican Republic students are mostly enrolled in private sector higher education universities and institutions. Between 50% and 75% of total enrollments in the previously mentioned countries are within the private sector. Conversely, Ecuador, Mexico, Venezuela, Paraguay, Peru and Guatemala see between 50% and 75% of their enrollments within the public sector. Cuba, Uruguay, Bolivia, Panama, Honduras and Argentina see the vast majority of their total enrollment within the public sector as well. These countries see about 75% to 100% of their total enrollment attend public institutions. There has been a clear trend in higher education in Latin America towards the commercialization and privatization of higher education. This is a trend that is evident throughout the world when it comes to higher education. An increase in private schools meaning more private money which introduces more flexibility when it comes to funding programs and beginning innovation initiatives. Since 1994, enrollment in private institutions has increased nearly 8% to 46% (from 38%) of total enrollment in 2002. Public institutions have seen a decline, however, losing that 8% in total enrollments. Public institutions are down to 54% in 2002.

Throughout the 1990s, the Inter-American Development bank altered its focus to the introduction of community colleges and other short-cycle colleges in the region. Then, its lending programs for more traditional higher education declined. During this time, the World Bank became a major player in making large investments in several countries. The countries where the largest investments were made were Argentina, Chile, Colombia, Mexico and Venezuela. The World Bank has also increased its funding efforts in Brazil, Chile, Mexico and Venezuela in the areas of science and technology research. The efforts by the World Bank are intended to support the modernization of higher education in major countries throughout Latin America. The funding was used for student aid, university grants, research grants and much more. The granting amounted to more than $1.5 billion since its initiative started.

Areas of study vary widely among institutions in Latin America. The majority of students’ fields of study are in social sciences, business and law. 42% of enrolled students are studying in social sciences, business and law. Whereas 14% are focusing on engineering, industry and construction. Just 10% are pursuing degrees in Education followed by sciences and health and social welfare each of which are at 9%. A 2015 report from the OECD pointed out that Latin American professionals are over-schooled and underpaid, due they don't have access to the right type of education. Since the 1980s and into the 1990s, there have been many attempts to reform education in Latin American in direct response to the increased interested in globalization. Although globalization has significantly affected Latin American countries, Latin America as a whole remains out the outskirts of the global research and knowledge centers.

One of the more recent efforts established by a Latin American country to increase globalization and an interest in the STEM (Science Technology Engineering and Math) fields is the Brazil Scientific Mobility Program. The initiative focuses on sending Brazilian undergraduate and graduate students to study in the United States for a limited period of time. Students must be majoring in a Brazilian institution in a STEM field in order to participate in the program. Participants are awarded a grant/scholarship that allows them to student in the United States for up to one year at a university with a focus in STEM-related areas. The initiative hopes to grant scholarships to Brazil's 100,000 best students in STEM fields. The Brazilian Scientific Mobility Program also allows Brazilian students to master the English language by offering them time to take intensive English language courses before moving onto STEM content classes. Since its conception, more than 20,000 Brazilian students have been placed at universities through the United States. Additionally 475 U.S. host institutions have been involved in hosting either academic or intensive English students or in some instance providing both programs. The primary area of study for Brazilian scholarship grantees is engineering where 65% of program grantees are engineering majors. The program goals complement the goals and areas of improvement from all of Latin America. The goals are to: "To promote scientific research; To invest in educational resources, allocated both within Brazil, and internationally; To increase international cooperation within science and technology and To initiate and engage students in global dialogue.

In order for Latin American countries to bolster their higher education efforts, they must work to broaden their higher education system and make their scientific and technological capability more robust. Additionally, more outreach must be obtained among nearby societies and countries in order to build rapport and relationships that extend to higher education. This could improve teacher training, collaboration in curriculum development and support schools in difficult student and teacher interactions. Finally, Latin America must be able to compete with the increased demands that globalization places upon higher education. Latin America must adapt their higher education institutions to reflect the globalization trend affecting higher education throughout the entire world. The trend is already affecting higher education in Latin American countries with initiatives such as the Brazilian Scientific Mobility Program but those programs are few. Providing more opportunities for Latin American students to study abroad even to other Latin American countries could really benefits students to change their worldviews. Eventually, such programs could affect education policy in many Latin American countries providing a strong partnership across the world.

To learn more about education systems specific to a particular Latin American country, find their webpages here: Argentina, Bolivia, Brazil, Chile, Colombia, Costa Rica, Cuba, Dominican Republic, Ecuador, El Salvador, Guatemala, Honduras, Mexico, Nicaragua, Panama, Paraguay, Peru, Puerto Rico, Uruguay, Venezuela.

=== Higher education funding ===
Latin American countries have developed a strong economic growth during the 2000s- the first time since the debt crisis of the 1980s. In addition, with a "demographic bonus", in which the proportion of children declines and thus the older generation has increased the size of the working-age population. Thus, for aging societies, it is essential to invest in advanced human capital for the quality and productivity of a smaller work force. So, the expanding regional growth increases the financial resources to train more and better-qualified higher education graduates. In Latin American countries, nearly half of enrollment in tertiary education is concentrated in institutions whose main source of funding is tuition and fees. Therefore, students and their parents are already contributing heavily to finance higher education institutions. Moreover, some of these countries charge tuition and fees to students at public universities; a prime example is Chile's public university sector. In other countries where undergraduate programs in public institutions are free of charge and the majority of the enrollment is concentrated in the public sector (as in Argentina and Uruguay), the government is the principal source of funding. However, this is not the case with graduate degrees as students usually pay the tuition and fees at graduate schools.

In most Latin American countries, with the exception of Chile, negotiating the funding model is still the most relevant mechanism to distribute core higher education funding to institutions. Additionally, since the late 1980s and 1990s, many of these governments have been allocating a small proportion of the total budget via formulas and funds to achieve specific objectives. Several Latin American countries took advantage of the boom years and raised their public and private investment in higher education. This also contributed to improving low-income students’ access to these institutions.

The complexity of Higher Education in the region can be viewed in a series of historical and emerging trends, in its heterogeneity, its inequality, but above all in the role that public universities and some very outstanding institutions of higher education can assume to construct a new scenario that can aid in significant improvement in the living conditions of its populations, and provide the possibility of greater well-being, democracy, and equality coming from science, education, and culture. The rest of this section will take a look at how Higher Education institutions in Latin America are funded. Changes have been occurring and the funding models appear to be moving targets.

Latin America is diverse with twenty sovereign states that stretch from the southern border of the United States to the southern tip of South America. With this much space and diversity, the funding for higher education can vary from state to state.

There seem to be four prevalent models for the financing of higher education in Latin America. These four models apply indiscriminately and in different combinations in the countries of the region, thus reflecting the diversity one observes in the region in terms of financing and policies and outcomes. The four prevalent models for financing Higher Education in Latin America are:

1. Direct public financing, provided to eligible institutions through the regular state budget, usually through legislative approval and through the respective ministry responsible for financial matters. The receiving institutions are state universities; this is, formal dependencies of state authority, which academics contracted through the public service, and with the application of management norms being those that are applicable to the public sector in general. Exceptions to this are the cases of Chile and Nicaragua, where for historical reasons, private institutions also receive this kind of public financing. In many states various conditions have been established for the use of the funds, thus restricting the autonomy of their institutional management. Some countries have attempted to make this fixed-base form of providing resources to Higher Education more flexible through budgetary review based on academic results.
2. Policy objective-based public financing. This treats resources that are usually not recurrent, included in special funds of a transitory nature or for attaining specific objectives or achievements of universities or institutions of Higher Education that those funds help to finance. Many of the objectives or goals established have to do with teaching, especially taking into account the numbers and quality of students (the case of the Indirect Fiscal Contribution in Chile), or with achievements in the area of research (funds in the case of Venezuela), or for graduate training (The CAPES model of Brazil). Less progress has been made in terms of programs that include negotiations with the state and competition between institutions to obtain funds based on management commitments. The Chilean experience regarding MECESUP (improvement of quality and equity in Higher Education) funds fostered this purpose, but the results in terms of sustainable achievements are still to be seen. In Argentina, the case of FOMEC (implemented competitive funds) is alike, with resources aimed at real investment programs. It is important to mention Brazil in this regard. The Ministry of Education established a program called PROUNI in 2005 with the purpose of optimizing the use of enrollment places offered by private universities. In effect, the excess of unused enrollment places, which tends to diminish efficiency in the provision of private education leads to an offer by the public sector to acquire them at a tuition cost below that originally charged. In this regard, the incentive for universities to fill their places and foster a greater absorption of students in the Higher Education system, giving preference for grants to student with the greatest financial need. In the short term, the government seeks to have some 400,000 students participating in this system, a figure that in 2006 was 250,000 students.
3. Private financing occurs through the payment of tuition on the part of families, by companies that finance research and graduate programs, or thorough private individuals or companies that make donations to institutions of Higher Education. The charging of student tuition is not only a practice carried out by multiple new universities that have emerged throughout the region. Charging for the cost of education has also been transformed into a practice that increasingly occurs in state universities as well- a situation that Chile is notorious for. Tuition charges and the ways in which this takes place is a controversial political theme in most countries, since it tends to reserve Higher Education for an elite, and has a negative long-term impact on the distribution of income. However, it is clear without greater financial commitment from states, further expansion of Higher Education can only be attained, once existing residual resources of the institutions have been used, only through a reduction of quality. This has placed in relief the emergence of accreditation institutions and procedures aimed being used as an instrument of control or at least of information, regarding private expansion and the progressive privatization of the state sector. In regard to the existence of private donations as a financing mechanism for Higher Education, the regulatory structure for doing so is extremely fragile in most Latin American countries. There is also a culture of distrust toward the public sector and academia in general terms, which also affects the possibility of establishing private company-university strategic alliances for financing and execution of projects with productive applications. From the university side, there is an anti-capitalist sentiment that sees the desire for profit as a negative influence on scientific and technological research.
4. A mixed model, that combines state financing, both fixed and by objectives and goals, with private financing based on the direct payment from students or through other mechanisms or private funding. The Chilean case is one of these (in which the state university sector collects monthly charges). The Mexico system is trying to grow the public resources allocated by objectives and goals. In Argentina, Bolivia, Colombia, Costa Rica, Peru and the Dominican Republic, countries for which information exists, between 10% (Costa Rica) and 38% (Peru) of the incomes of institutions of Higher Education come from their own resources generated by private activities.

Tuition charges have progressively become a reality in institutions of Higher Education in Latin America. Public and state universities face serious structural financial problems, especially because their resources embrace teaching, research, and extension, including the production of public goods that do not necessarily have an explicit financial counterpart. These universities also obey a number of public regulation which often raise their costs significantly. Financial restrictions oblige them to cover at least part of their costs based on student fees. This has led to profound and sustained conflicts. The conversations around funding Higher Education in Latin America are ongoing.

Overall, Latin American countries have made great progress in improving their education systems, particular in the last two decades. The governments have increased spending on education, expanded cooperation with the United States, the World Bank, and other donors, and pledged to achieve certain educational milestones established through the Organization of American States' Summit of the Americas process. However, despite these recent improvements, Latin America's education indicators still lag behind the developed world and many developing countries of comparable income levels in East Asia.

=== Student opportunities and future challenges ===
Organizations which link higher education between Latin America and Europe include AlßAN (now ERASMUS Mundos), ALFA and AlInvest. The ALFA Program of co-operation between Higher Education Institutions (HEI's) of the European Union and Latin America "began in 1994 and sought to reinforce co-operation in the field of Higher Education. The program co-finances projects aimed at improving the capacity of individuals and institutions (universities and other relevant organizations) in the two regions". AlßAN provided scholarships to Latin American students, but was replaced in 2010 by ERASMUS Mundos, which provides avenues for Latin American students to study in Europe. ERASMUS Mundos also fosters community and cooperation between Latin America and the European Union. The program provides joint masters and doctoral programs, including a scholarship scheme. It has the aim of "mobility flows of students and academics between European and non-European higher education institutions [and the] promotion of excellence and attractiveness of European higher education worldwide...The European Commission informs potential applicants about funding opportunities through a program guide and regular calls for proposals published on the Erasmus Mundus website".

Organizations exist to foster cooperation between Latin American and North American higher education, as well. The Ibero-American University Council (CUIB) and the Latin American Network for the Accreditation and Quality of Higher Education are two such organizations. "Latin American and North American cooperation is often labeled inter-American and is exemplified by organizations such as the Inter-American Organization for Higher Education (IOHE) and the Organization of American States (OAS )". According to the World Bank, the Latin American region is "defined in a cultural and geographical sense. It includes all the countries from Mexico to Argentina. Organizations such as the Latin American Universities Union and the Institute for Higher Education in Latin America and Caribbean are good examples of regional organizations. Sub-regional organizations include the Montevideo Group University Association (AUGM), the Association of Universities of the Amazon (UNAMAZ), and the Council of University presidents for the Integration of the West-Central Sub-Region of South America (CRISCO)".

== Gender Gap ==
In the midst of an educational crisis in Latin America, there is a gender gap present within the schooling system. Various regions in Latin American countries are affected differently by the gap due to inter-sectional factors, such as economic state and societal beliefs. Generally, higher dropout rates plague rural regions, where children are pressured to work, opposed to suburban regions. Generally, rural areas lack the relative amount of resources that urban areas have, and families living in these areas experience poverty at greater frequencies. Their economic disadvantage leads these families to send their male children to school, rather than female children, when they are given the option. This decision has resulted in lower enrollment rates in school for female children. The gap in enrollment is present starting from basic education, which has been defined in literature as the stage of education that encompasses childhood education, primary school, and early stages of secondary school. Research suggests greater prevalence of gender differences in higher education. Generally, early education is free and higher education requires tuition costs. Consequently, enrollment rates are more dependent on income levels instead of gender. Even among the wealthiest group of individuals, females are less likely to participate in higher education than males.

In previous decades, females achieved lower levels and less years of education compared to males, even in more economically developed countries. However, as time progressed, the gender gap began to shrink at a rate of approximately 0.27 years of schooling per decade. From the 1960s, the gap began to shift towards the favor of females; females are attending more years of school and differences in enrollment rates between the sexes are diminishing.

Societal expectations of boys and girls in these countries have a major influence on these dropout rates. The gender roles created by society often vary across cultures, as do the expectations of the type of responsibilities that female and male children will take on in the household. Boys are expected to provide for the household under domestic economic strain. Despite having a higher enrollment rate, male children experience higher dropout rates and attain lower levels of education. Similarly, female children in rural regions experience higher dropout rates after domestic emergencies, to care for the family and household. However, when granted the opportunity, females contribute to higher promotion rates and are less likely to repeat years of schooling. Differences due to societal expectations still exist in more economically advantaged Latin American countries and regions, but at lower rates and with more equality between the sexes.

=== Migration ===
The gender gap in education also contributes to the unique experience of migrants from Latin America. If young adults and children anticipate that they will be migrating, then they are less likely to attend to school in their native country, and less likely to value its importance. A common belief, cited as a reason for this phenomenon, is that they feel education will not make a difference when they are working overseas. Contrarily, individuals who have access to education, and obtain an education in their native country, view the importance of education upon migration differently. These individuals believe that education will bring about more opportunities for them upon migration. Whether or not one views education as a beneficial factor to their migration is likely due to their cultural norms, which encourage different roles for boys and girls. Women are expected to take care of their parents, and for those who assume this cycle continues when they have children, their desire to attend school diminishes. First generation immigrant women are most influenced by the more liberal social norms in the United States; they are presented with higher availability of education and employment. Once in the United States, 54% are employed outside of their homes, and 87% of those who are employed outside the home work in jobs consistent with their gender roles. Typically, women working these jobs did not receive an education in their native country. Men are also influenced by the opportunities that women have in the country, as they are used to being granted the educational and employment opportunities back home. Upon migration to the United States, men long to go back to their native country earlier than women. Gender roles create a sense of power among men, and being presented with liberal gender roles for women often takes away the sense of power they may have felt back home. Factors such as income, cultural beliefs, and region influence how one experiences the gender differences that accompany education and migration.

== Educational Labor Unions in Latin America ==
Effects of Labor Union on Latin American education

Given the increased trend of children enrolling into schools, the resources of Latin American educational systems have become increasingly strained with poor students who require additional public resources for success., On recent tests of mathematics and science, around half of Latin American students scored below the lowest proficiency levels. These problems are combatted through the formation of teachers labor unions.

Effects of Labor Unions

From 1989 to 1997, the number of countries with national testing systems has increased 2 to 21. These reforms have continued throughout the 2000s, several countries starting in 2006 have set national standards including Nicaragua, Colombia, and Argentina. The changing policies have brought teachers’ union under the light as important policy actors. Studies conducted by Murillo on labor unions in Peru have shown that labor unions have improved student achievement overall by retaining experienced teachers and lowering class sizes; although strikes, a key means by which unions exert power over policy, negatively impacts students affected by them. It was found that school days that were lost to strikes consequently lowered the exam scores of the students. It was also found that tenure, a common demand of teachers' unions, has increased student achievement in classes, even despite increased days of teacher absence because of the job security which these teachers felt. There has also been evidence that formation of unions has allowed in a decrease of classroom sizes. On average there is one less student per every teacher which allows for teachers to spend more time with an individual student.

Professionalization of Teachers in Unions

Specifically in Argentina the union has played an important role in the formation of accredited professional development courses. In 1994 CTERA signed an agreement with UNC and started a series of teacher training programs. In 2000, two graduate tracks were developed and more than 1600 teachers were trained. Teachers who are actively involved in the union develop a sense of professionalism through the experience of organizing. Because teachers’ union activity centers on particular education projects formed by the union itself, involvement in the formation of education goals and initiatives shapes teachers’ sense of their worth as practitioners. Therefore, participation in the union allows teachers to deepen their knowledge, commitment and practice. In Brazil, from 1998 to 2002 the union published their enrolled members final assignments for the class. Peruvian education is characterized by high coverage and extremely low expenditures per student. Specific programs such as MECEP has increased inputs and training for teachers hoping to enhance education system.

Addition of Incentives

In countries like Brazil and Chile "incentive schemes" were initiated. An incentive scheme is a policy which financially awards the teachers. However resistance has been noticed depending on the type of the incentive. Teachers from many Latin American countries have opposed incentives based on the evaluations of teachers themselves (Ecuador, Peru, Chile and partially Mexico) or of student's test scores (Ecuador, Peru, Chile and partially Mexico). The addition of incentives can lead to both positive and negative impacts. Some of the positive factors will include a teacher's dedication towards their work to improve the overall level of education of all students. These methods also help filter out teachers who are not the best teachers. If a teacher's performance is not meeting the set standards then it is a sign that something is wrong and a change is required. If incentives involve rewards then high scores among a few students can boost the overall average. In such cases a teacher might focus the bulk of their attention towards the brighter students and neglecting the other kids.

Bolivia

Education in rural areas of Bolivia have been a problem because people in these areas belong to poor farming families. These areas consist people of indigenous people and who don't have a lot money therefore are unable to afford an education. An organization known as the CONMERB started a teaching proposal in 1983 known as the "Global plan for the restructuring of rural education in Bolivia". This plan called for bilingual and bicultural education and was promoted at union events. This program took a progressive turn when President Morales decreased the National Literacy Program for the republic of Bolivia in April 2006. At that point 13.7% of Bolivian population was considered illiterate but by 2009, Bolivia had declared itself as an illiteracy free zone and was subsequently congratulated by UNESCO.

Peru

In Peru, the government of Alan García (2005–2011) promulgated a reform of the Teachers’ Statute without negotiating with the Trade Union of Education Workers of Peru (SUTEP). The reform was proposed along with a series of other anti-union measures (for example, the government reduced the number of union leaders who could be exempted from their teaching duties to concentrate on union tasks). Public Educator Law No. 29,062 was enacted in 2007 amid an indefinite SUTEP strike explicitly against this bill. One of the biggest points of contention was the proposed evaluation of teacher performance. In the law's current form, the Committee for Evaluation of Education, in which two parents and three teachers participate, manages the teacher evaluation, which applies criteria set by the Ministry; after three unsatisfactory evaluations, teachers are dismissed. Hence, rules have been put into place which requires the teachers to meet certain standards by the government or the union themselves. This helps filter out those teachers that are not doing their job in a proper manner.

Violence Against Labor Unions

Due to their political activity, unions of Latin America have faced years of harassment. Often, police forces intervene in teachers' strikes in Latin America. For example, in Peru the teachers demanded the president to stick to his promises of higher wages for teachers and more money on education. To justify the violence in response, the Peruvian government has called teachers terrorists and said they are trying to overthrow the government. As another example, in September 2019, Argentinian CTERA-affiliated teachers launched a one-day national strike to protest a violent attack by civil gangs, followed by police repression, on teachers striking for a pay rise in the province of Chubut.

Difficulty in Assessing Effect of Labor Union on Education

There is a lot of difficulty in analyzing the effect of Labor Unions on Education. There are many other factors that go into affecting the educational efficiency of a school. Violence of the area, parental influence or income of the school and the students families. It is possible that there are areas of affluent children in schools in which unions exist. Further studies are being conducted to precisely determine the direct effects of labor unions on the quality of education of students in Latin American schools. However the implementation of unions has been demonstrated to increase the professionalism among teachers, and unions can also lead to creation of competitive policies that can lead to a better education. Formation of unions also increase the number of teachers who are more dedicated towards their jobs.

== See also ==
- Inclusive education in Latin America
- Right to education

== Sources ==
This article incorporates text from a free content work. Licensed under CC-BY-SA IGO 3.0 (license statement/permission). Text taken from Youth and changing realities: rethinking secondary education in Latin America, 15,18, López, Néstor; Opertti, Renato; Vargas Tamez, Carlos, UNESCO. UNESCO.

This article incorporates text from a free content work. Licensed under CC BY-SA 3.0 IGO. Text taken from Behind the numbers: ending school violence and bullying, 70, UNESCO. UNESCO.
