= Youth in the Dominican Republic =

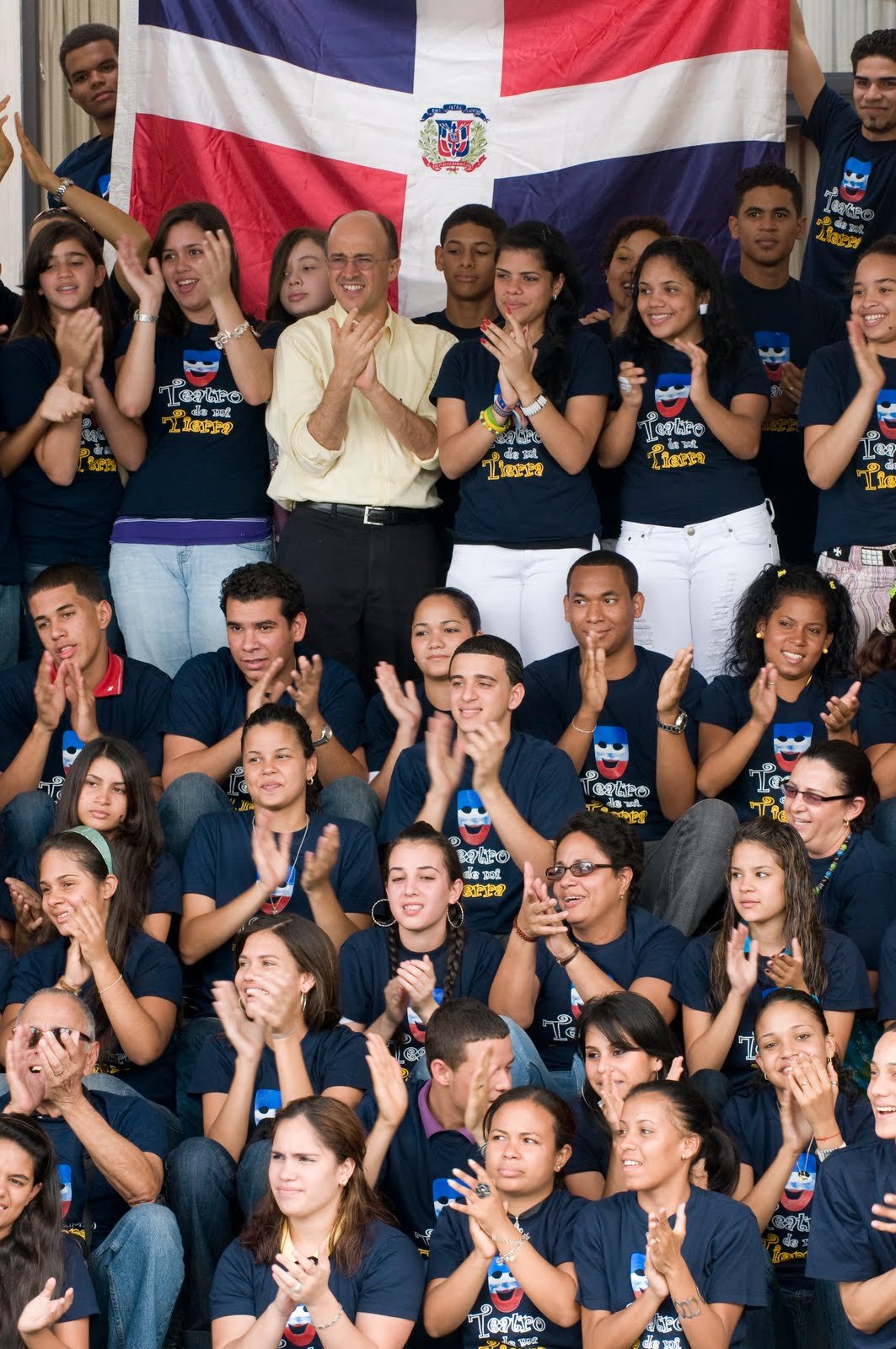
Young Dominicans in Santiago, Dominican Republic students.

Youth in the Dominican Republic constitutes just over 30% of the total population. The Dominican Republic's population at roughly eleven million people has grown tremendously with the help of the youth population. In 1960, the youth population was at 3.3 million, and by 2008, it had reached 9.5 million, with two thirds of them in urban areas of the country.

The Dominican Republic is considered a middle-income country, and thrives economically through tourism and telecommunications. Tourism is the single best revenue earner and over 25,000 youth are employed in this sector. Although tourism generates large revenues, some scholars and activists argue that the development of tourism has negative impacts on youth by keeping them from pursuing higher education.

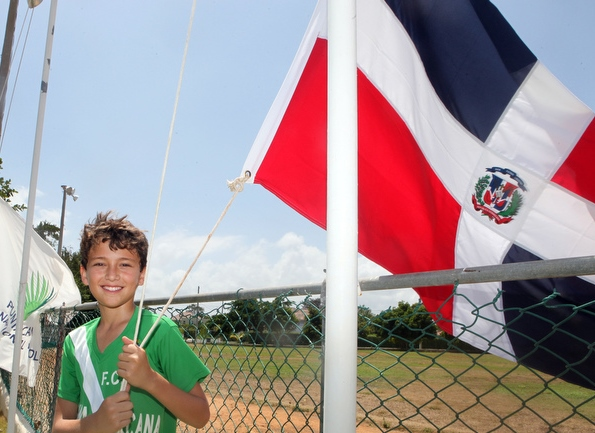
A young boy holding a flag of the Dominican Republic.

Primary and secondary education are free to all citizens of the Dominican Republic. Higher education is free in the public sector, most notably at the Universidad Autónoma de Santo Domingo, which enrolls 44% of the total tertiary student population.

The Dominican Republic is the only country that has a youth-only secretariat. In 2000, the country approved its General Youth Law, which allocates a budget of 1% of the national budget for the youth secretariat. The General Youth Law helps with youth development programs that promote education and development. The country also has multiple governmental laws that protect minors younger than eighteen years old from being arrested, legally processed, and going to jail.

== Education ==
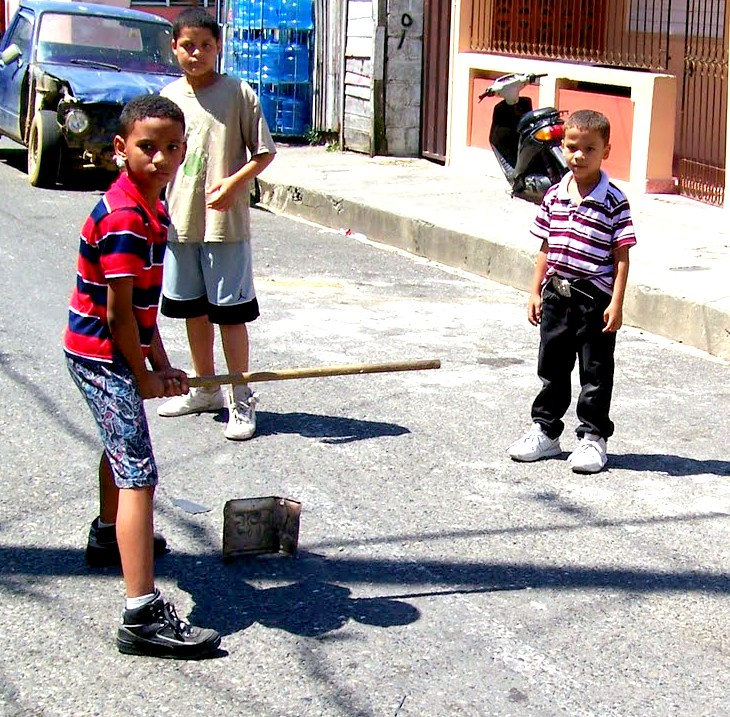
Dominican Republic kids playing baseball style ball game in the street.

Education in the Dominican Republic is free and compulsory at the elementary level, and free but not mandatory at the secondary level. Basic education enrollment is 89%, while secondary education enrollment is lower at 50%, as some youth face different constraints to accessing education at this level. Around 55% of children and adolescents do not attend school because their right to enter the system is denied. This restricted access to education affects children who do not have documents, which includes children who were born in the country to undocumented Haitian parents.

Many Haitians migrate to the Dominican Republic increasing the youth population in the school systems. There was an increase of Haitians in the Dominican Republic after an earthquake struck the island in 2010, killing over 200,000 people.

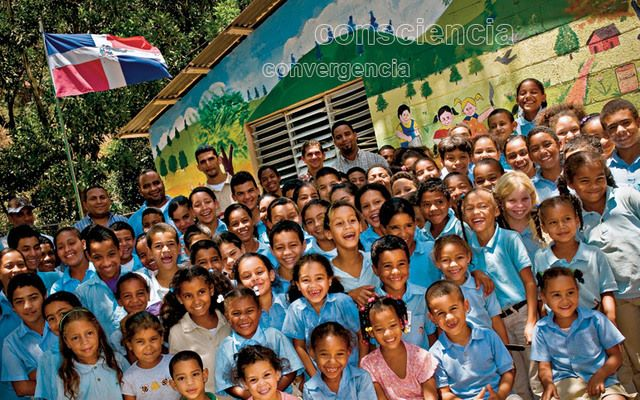
A group of Dominican children at primary school.

Overcrowding is one problem that schools face, especially in urban settings. In public schools with 500 students or more (accounting for 68% of total enrollment), the student-teacher ratio is 78:1 (clarify this). Teachers are not able to work with individual students. Youth spend almost ten years in school, but make progress very slowly because they have to repeat grades. 12.4% of youth repeat the first three grades in urban areas, while 7.7% repeat grades in rural areas. Nearly 25,000 youth ages 15–19 characterized themselves as unable to read or write. Teachers in the Dominican Republic may only understand around 40% of the material they are teaching.

== Youth policy and law ==
Youth in the Dominican Republic face challenges to participating fully and positively in society. The Ministry of Youth and the General Youth Law of 2000 pinpoints Youth Civic Participation as an important part of promoting youth development and well-being. The General Youth Law has a national education-based policy that requires high school students to complete sixty hours of service as a prerequisite of graduation.

The Law for the System of Protection regulates the treatment of minors from birth to age 18. This law states that children under the age of 13 are not criminally liable, while youth ages 13–18 are. The electoral participation rate in the Dominican Republic is higher than the Latin America average, as over 77.3 percent indicated they had voted in the last election. Younger residents between the ages of 18 and 25 had a 29.2 percent voting rate, compared to 75.6 percent in the 26–35 year age range.

Youth Civic Participation Programs attempt to foster youths' positive civic participation and reduce negative and illegal behaviors. Other programs are available to help youth obtain birth certificates and identity documents. As of 2006, there were 17,000 children and youth who have been issued birth certificates, allowing them to attend school and vote in elections.

Youth in the Dominican Republic tend to distrust government officials and institutions because they feel exploited. They tend to fear the judicial process; afraid jail will hinder them from reaching adulthood. Young adults in the Dominican Republic say that they believe they have a negative image in society, but ultimately just want their voices heard by older members of the community.

Some organizations that seek to empower young people with the specific intent that they will go out and further empower their communities are Fundacion Sur Adelante and the Callegjera-Action Educational Foundation. These organizations work with the youth population to mobilize them to become change agents. They also provide them with access to libraries, computers, and law services to allow them the awareness they need to better organize themselves for the future. There are also set policies that help youth improve their creative and innovative skills for the workforce and reducing barriers that could limit their access to the labor market. These policies are responsible for detecting and removing children from child labor, while also ensuring compliance with labor rights.

== Employment ==
Youth face difficulties when entering the labor market and have unemployment rates considerably higher than adults. In 2008, youth ages 10–24 represented 24% of the total labor force in the Dominican Republic, and 43% of the total unemployed population. Unemployment in the Dominican Republic appears to be in a slight but steady increase of 14.3 percent since 2010. An unbalanced market of supply and demand limits the number of jobs available to youth. Skill gaps prove to be another obstacle to the youth and jobs are too complex for youth just out of high school or college. The lack of counseling services available to youth often prohibit them from obtaining jobs.

Over 75% of the youth labor force is concentrated in five activities: wholesale and retail trade, other services, manufacturing, hotels, bars and restaurants, and agriculture. Agriculture is the primary source of employment for youth in rural areas while wholesale and retail trade is the primary source of employment for youth in urban areas. Self-employment is also a popular option among all age groups in the Dominican Republic. It has increased from 34% in 1991 to about 43% in 2011, leading to a measured increase in familiarity and comfort when working. The labor force participation is lower among young women due to gender stereotypes, which causes them to rely on self-employment. In 2007, the average wage for women was 87% of the average wage for men.

One program available for youth trying to find employment is "Quesqueya believes in you" or NEO in the Dominican Republic, which is a program designed to increase job opportunities for low-income people, aged 15–29, living in urban areas of thirteen of the country's provinces. Another program available is Espacios para Emprender (EpE), which is designed to equip 14–17 year old adolescents with the strategies required to find a job or establish a micro-enterprise.

Work and education, combined early in life, often burden youth. Some youth believe that relocating to a larger city would benefit them and provide more opportunity in the work force.

== Crime ==
In 2011, poverty levels were around 40.4%, compared to 32% in 2000. The World Bank 2006 study conducted a study on youth violence in the Caribbean and the primary motivation identified for committing a crime was the desire to escape poverty. The scarcity of resources may push young people into unsustainable and dangerous survival activities often creating violent neighborhoods. In Latin America and the Caribbean, it is estimated that over 50% of the population between 12 and 24 years is at-risk in participating in illegal and dangerous activities.

== Health ==
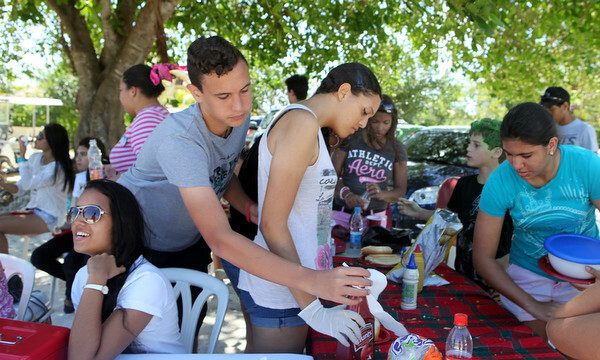
Young Dominicans

In the Dominican Republic, the population ages 15–24 are documented as the healthiest age group. One issue in the health sector is sexual health. 15% of females and 24% of males ages 15–24 reported have their first sexual relation before age 15. The proportion of youth who have sex at a young age was inversely related to both education and income. Youth that were sexually active early in life had dropped out of school earlier that those who had waited to engage in sexual activity.

Fewer than half of the female population that were sexually active used contraception. Because of the limited use of contraception, the Dominican Republic has one of the highest HIV/AIDS rates outside of Africa. Females are more susceptible to HIV and AIDS given that they are more likely to engage in commercial sex work compared to males.

The Code for the System of Protection and Fundamental Rights of Children and Adolescents guarantees the rights to health and health services for children and adolescents. The General Law of Health ensures that these rights are preserved for youth, women, senior citizens, and the disabled.

82% of males ages 15–19 and 73.5% of females reported having consumed alcohol sometime in the prior three months. Although the legal drinking age is eighteen, many young adults begin consuming before that.
