= Universidad Eugenio María de Hostos =

University in Santo Domingo

Universidad Eugenio María de Hostos (UNIREMHOS) is a university in Santo Domingo in the Dominican Republic. It is named after Eugenio Maria de Hostos. The school was founded in 1984 (42 years ago).

The university provides instruction in various different fields: medicine, law, social communication, nursing, dentistry, accounting, marketing, computational systems and administration. They also confer master degrees in public health, education and epidemiology.

The university has been immersed in various scandals associated with its medical school that had led to the express disapproval by several medical boards (e.g., those of California, Kansas, and Indiana) in the United States.
