= American School of Santo Domingo =

International bilingual school

Coordinates: 18.50825°N 69.9434607°W

The American School of Santo Domingo (ASSD) is an international bilingual school in Santo Domingo.

Accredited by the Dominican Ministry of Education and by AdvancED, its students graduate with a high school diploma valid in the Dominican Republic, the United States, and internationally.

Ranked #109 in the list of 1899 high schools in the country and #65 in math scores according to the state national exams
