= Universidad Experimental Félix Adam =

Dominican Republic private university

Félix Adam Experimental University
- Universidad Experimental Félix Adam
- Type: Private
- Established: February 14, 1996; 29 years ago
- President: Dr. Andrés Matos Sena
- Location: Santo Domingo, Distrito Nacional, Dominican Republic
- Website: http://www.unefa.edu.do/

The Félix Adam Experimental University (Spanish: "Universidad Experimental Felix Adam" (UNEFA)) is a private university in the Dominican Republic, founded in Santo Domingo, Distrito Nacional on February 14, 1996. The institution is sponsored by the Foundation Academia de Profesores para la Paz Mundial (APROPAZ, Professors for World Peace Academy), which was founded in 1991. The Dominican National Council of Higher Education (CONES) approved UNEFA through the resolution No. 010/96.

UNEFA offers three types of study plans: Supervised Open Studies (EUAS), a modality consisting of part-time attendance and supervised studies, monitored by professors and facilitators; Free Open Studies (ELIS), requiring from the students certain part-time contact with the university with at least one fourth of any degree's core courses; and the Accreditation of Knowledge by Experience (PAAPE), which is a continuous process in which obtained knowledge is accredited towards the completion of a chosen degree, based on its correspondence to required levels of higher education studies.

The University is named after Félix Adam, who helped eradicate illiteracy in Caribbean countries like Cuba and Dominican Republic; Central America, such as Costa Rica, Panama, Honduras, Nicaragua and El Salvador; and in South America in Peru, Bolivia and Uruguay. Based in his Venezuelan experience, he organized in these countries literacy campaigns, school farms and Adult Education Centers. For his outstanding contributions in Latin American and the Caribbean, he received in 1967 the World Literacy Prize Mohamed Reza Pahlavi, which UNESCO was granting for the first time . Arguably his most significant contribution to Education was made in 1971 when he submitted for consideration by UNESCO its greatest work “Andragogy: Science of Adult Education.”
