= Babeque secundaria =

High school in the Dominican Republic

Babeque Secundaria is a high school in the Dominican Republic.
