= Luz para Todos =

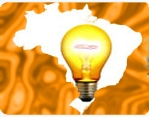
The program logo

Luz para Todos ("Light for All") is a program of the Federal Government of Brazil, launched in November 2003, with a goal of bringing electricity to more than 10 million rural people by the year 2008. It was initiated by Dilma Rousseff, then Minister of Mines and Energy of Brazil, operated by the large power utility company Eletrobras, and executed by electricity concessionaires and cooperatives.

The project promotes renewable energy as the most practical solution in remote areas. To encourage utilizing that kind of energy, the federal government pays up to 85% of the costs for renewable energy projects in those areas.

During the program execution, more families without power at home were located, and the program was extended to be completed in 2010.
