= Deutsch-Französisches Gymnasium Freiburg im Breisgau =

Deutsch-Französisches Gymnasium Freiburg / Lycée franco-allemand de Fribourg
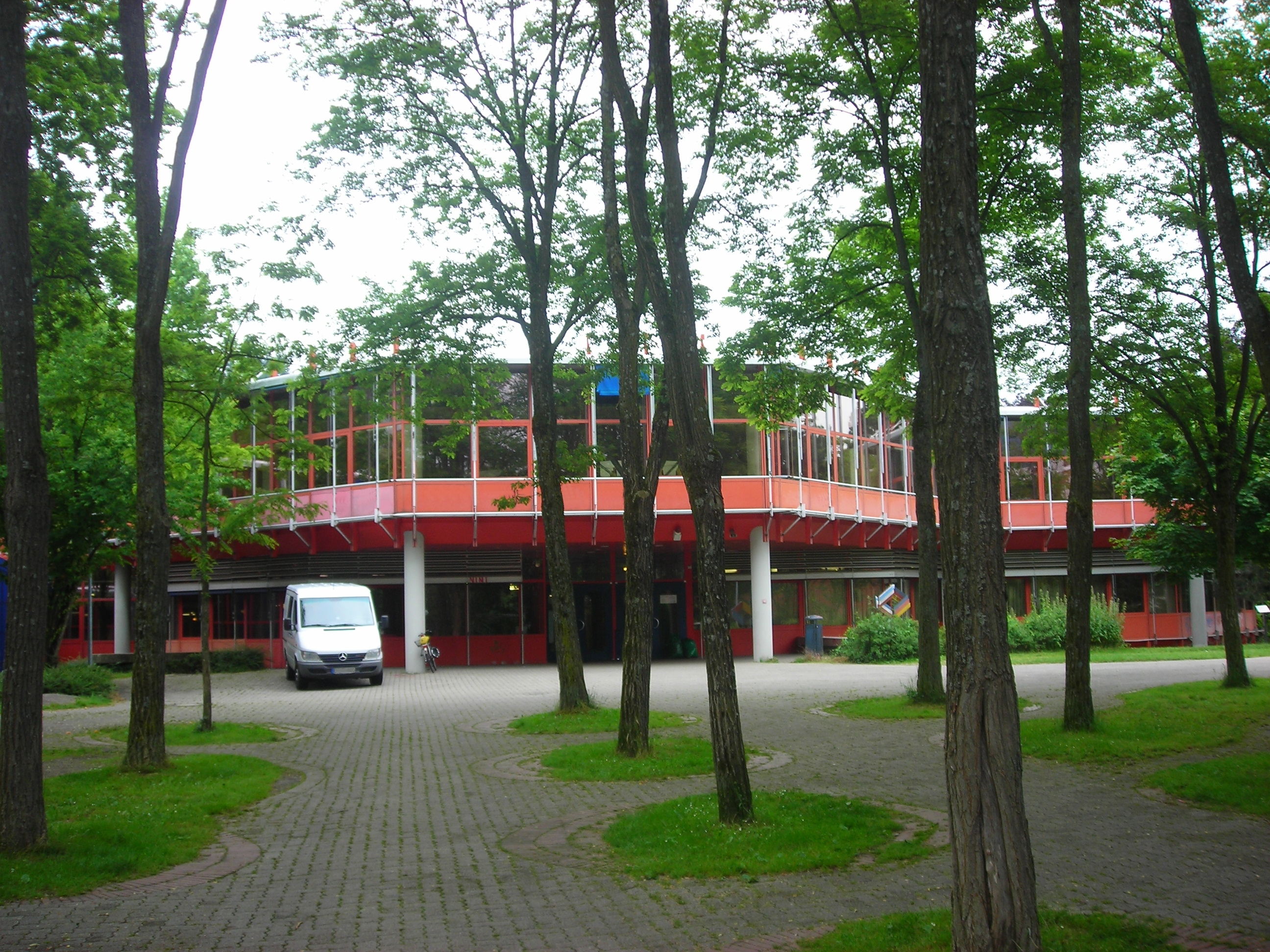
- DFG/LFA Freiburg

Location
- Freiburg im Breisgau; Germany
- Coordinates: 47.9902°N 7.8727°E

Information
- Type: DFG/LFA
- Opened: 1972
- Principal: Drosten Zeiss (Baden-Württemberg) and Miguel Rubio (AEFE)
- Faculty: c. 90
- Enrollment: 802 in 2021-22
- Website: dfglfa.net/dfg

The DFG / LFA Freiburg (French: Lycée Franco-Allemand de Fribourg; is a DFG/LFA, a public French-German secondary school in Freiburg im Breisgau, Germany. It offers free education from grades 5 through 12.

The Deutsch-Französisches Gymnasium Freiburg (DFG Freiburg; French: Lycée Franco-Allemand de Fribourg-en-Brisgau) is a German–French secondary school in Freiburg im Breisgau, Baden-Württemberg, Germany. Together with its counterparts in Saarbrücken, Buc and Hamburg, it is one of the four Deutsch-Französische Gymnasien offering the binational French-German Baccalaureate.

== History ==
The establishment of the school traces back to the Élysée Treaty of 22 January 1963, signed by French President Charles de Gaulle and German Chancellor Konrad Adenauer. The treaty sought to "reshape the relationship between the two peoples from the ground up," assigning a decisive role to youth in consolidating Franco-German friendship. It emphasized the importance of mutual language acquisition, called for regulations on the equivalence of school years, examinations, and university degrees, and encouraged the creation of institutions enabling closer ties between French and German students.

In 1972, this framework was implemented with the creation of the Franco-German Baccalaureate and the founding of several Franco-German schools, including the DFG Freiburg.

== Curriculum ==
Final year students take the French-German Baccalaureate, a diploma recognised by France as equivalent to the Baccalauréat and by Germany as equivalent to the Abitur.

For the final three years, students choose between literary, social sciences, and natural sciences branches (L, ES and S), following the model of French lycées.

In 2017, on the occasion of the 60th anniversary of the Treaty of Rome, the school's student representatives published a pro-European opinion piece entitled "Don't mess with the European Union".

== Amenities ==
The campus consists of an old building with an annex and a gym, a new building, a sports field, and a pavilion. The old building was designed by Konrad Kuhn and was built in 1976. It stands on the former site of the municipal plant nursery, which moved to the Mundenhof in the early 1970s.

The roofs of the old and new buildings are equipped with photovoltaic solar panels with a combined nominal power of 55 kW_{p}. The panels were erected by students and teachers, and belong to a registered association (e.V.) founded in 2002. The association also installed a small wind turbine on the new building.

The school offers rooms in its boarding school in Günterstal, which housed 64 residents in 2017. Around 100 students live across the French border in Alsace and attend school using a bus organised by parents.

== Notable alumni ==
- Franziska Brantner, former Member of the European Parliament and member of the German Bundestag since 2013
- Isabelle Joschke, sailor
- Anna Peters, former federal spokesperson of the Grüne Jugend
- David Afkham

== See also ==
- Deutsch-Französisches Gymnasium (about the school form)

German international schools in France:

- DFG / LFA Buc
- DFG / LFA Strasbourg
- Internationale Deutsche Schule Paris
- Deutsche Schule Toulouse
