= Deutsch-Französisches Gymnasium Hamburg =

School in Hamburg, Germany

Coordinates: 53.6043°N 9.9577°E

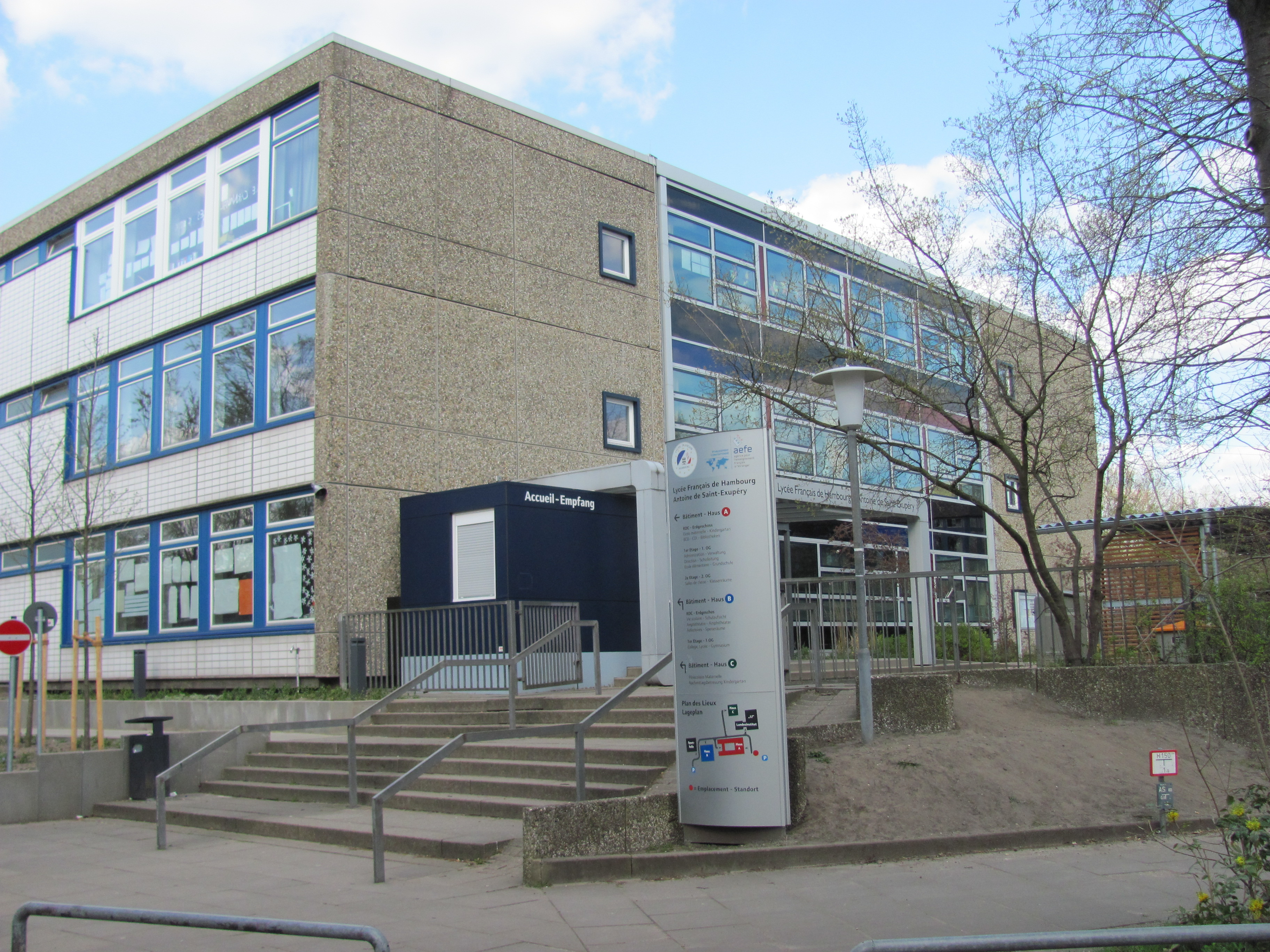
- Main entrance

Location
- Hartsprung 23, 22529 Hamburg, Germany

Information
- Other name: Lycée Franco-Allemand Hambourg
- Established: 2020 (as a DFG/LFA)

The Deutsch-Französisches Gymnasium Hamburg (DFG) or Lycée Franco-Allemand Hambourg (LFA) is a public, French-German school in Hamburg, Germany. It is directly operated by the Agency for French Education Abroad (AEFE), an agency of the French government, and is a part of its network.

The DFG/LFA is a secondary school and welcomes students from fifth to twelfth grade (equivalent to German Gymnasium and French collège and lycée). Like all Lycées Franco-Allemands, it prepares them for the Bac Franco-Allemand, a high school diploma recognised by France as equivalent to the Baccalauréat and by Germany as equivalent to the Abitur diploma.

Until August 2020, the Gymnasium/Lycée was known as Lycée Français de Hambourg Antoine de Saint-Exupéry and was operated jointly with the nursery and primary school École Française de Hambourg Antoine de Saint-Exupéry. For the 2020/21 academic year, it took its current name and status as a DFG / LFA.

== See also ==
- Institut français de Hambourg
- La Gazette de Berlin
- Deutsch-Französisches Gymnasium / Lycée Franco-Allemand
  - DFG/LFA Buc
  - DFG/LFA Freiburg
  - DFG/LFA Saarbrücken
