= Deutsch-Französisches Gymnasium =

Type of school in France and Germany

DFG / LFA Deutsch-Französische Gymnasien lycées franco-allemands
- Locations of the DFG/LFAs

Location
- France, Germany

District information
- Type: International secondary schools
- Grades: French branch 6–12, German branch 5–12
- Established: First school: 1961 (65 years ago); school form legally formalised: 1972 (53 years ago)
- Governing agency: In France: Central Agency for German Schools Abroad and Académie de Strasbourg / Académie de Versailles; In Germany: Agency for French Education Abroad and Baden-Württemberg education ministry / Hamburg education authority / Saarbrücken district
- Schools: 5

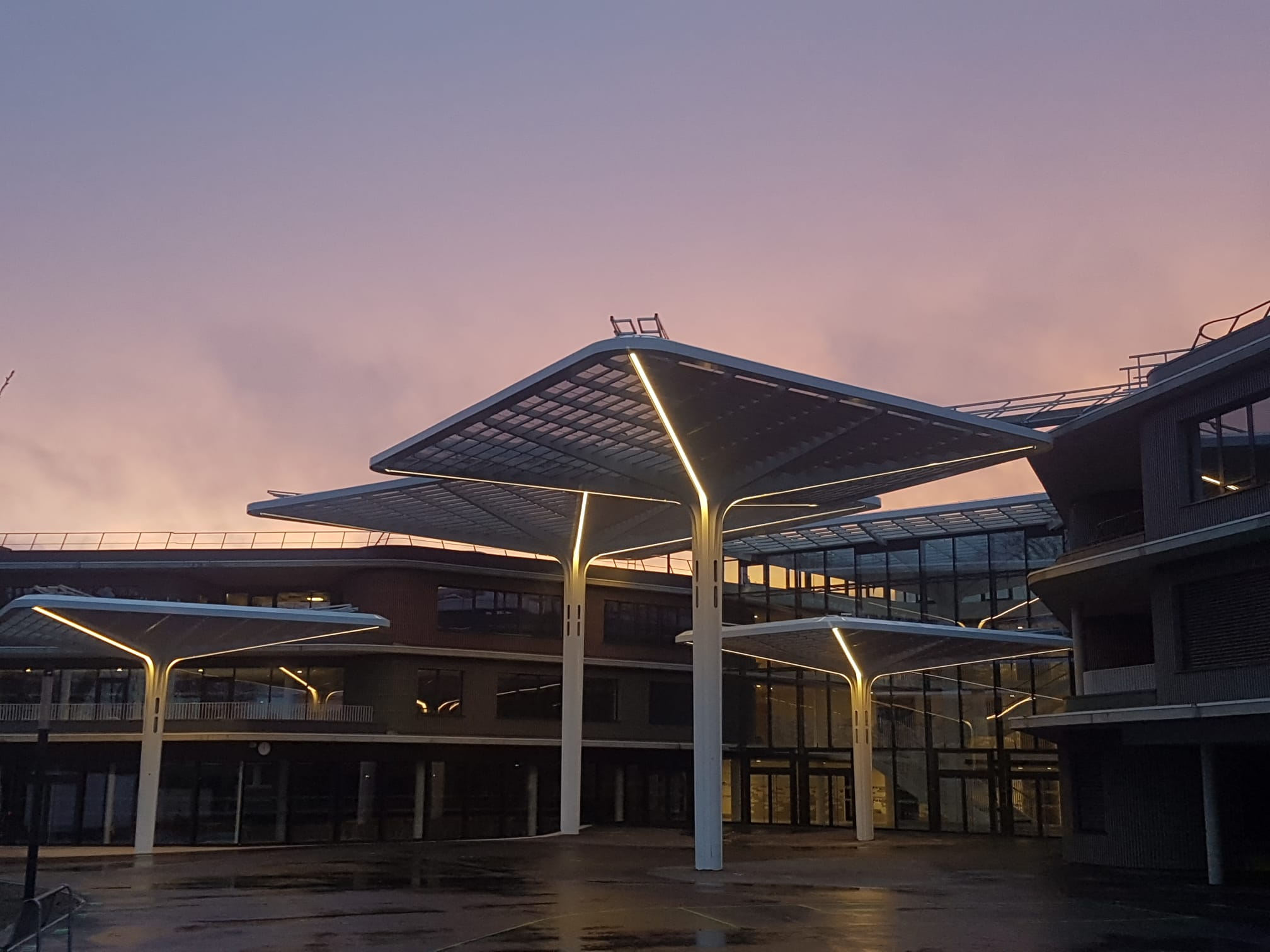
DFG / LFA Buc

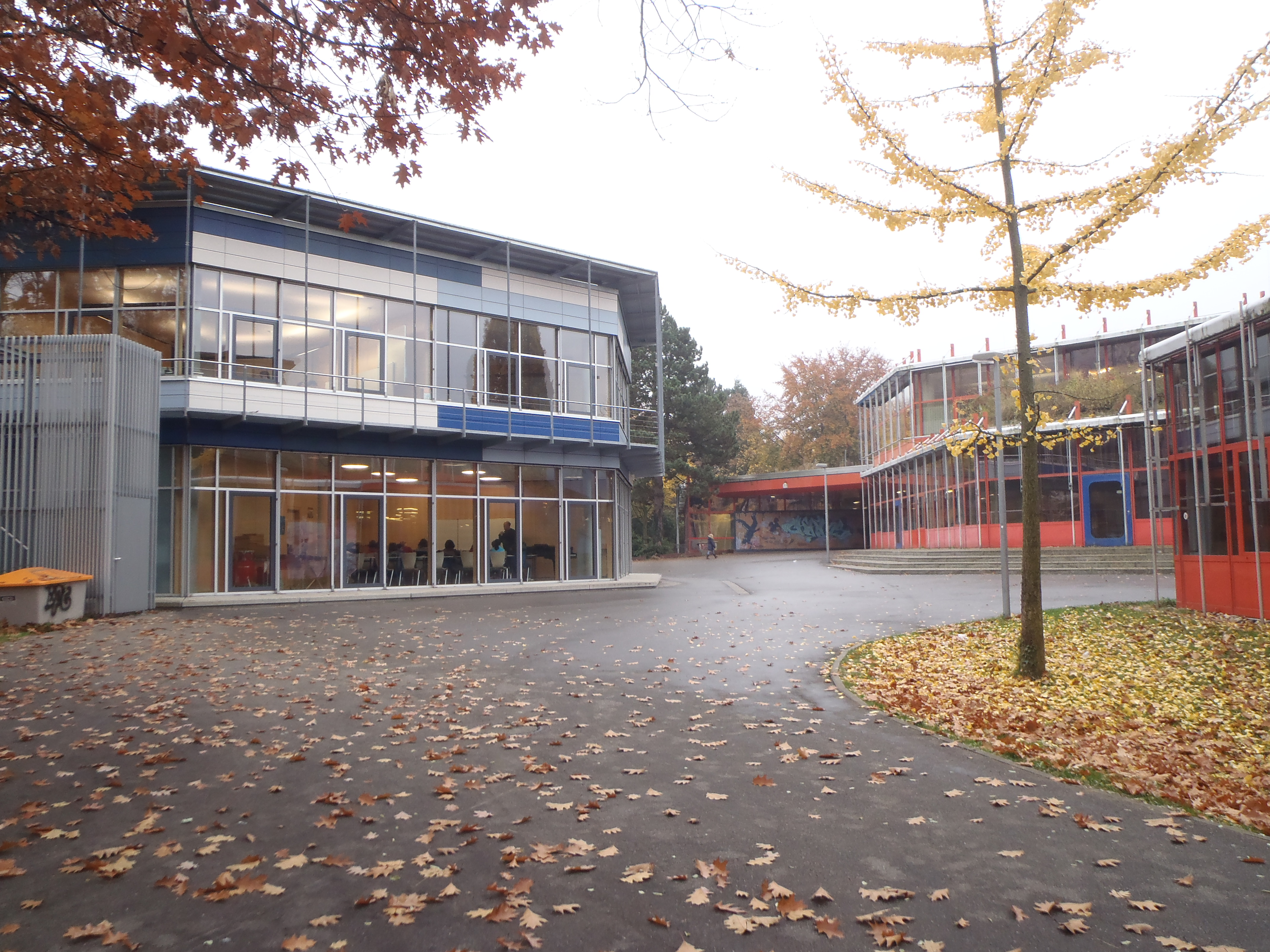
DFG / LFA Freiburg

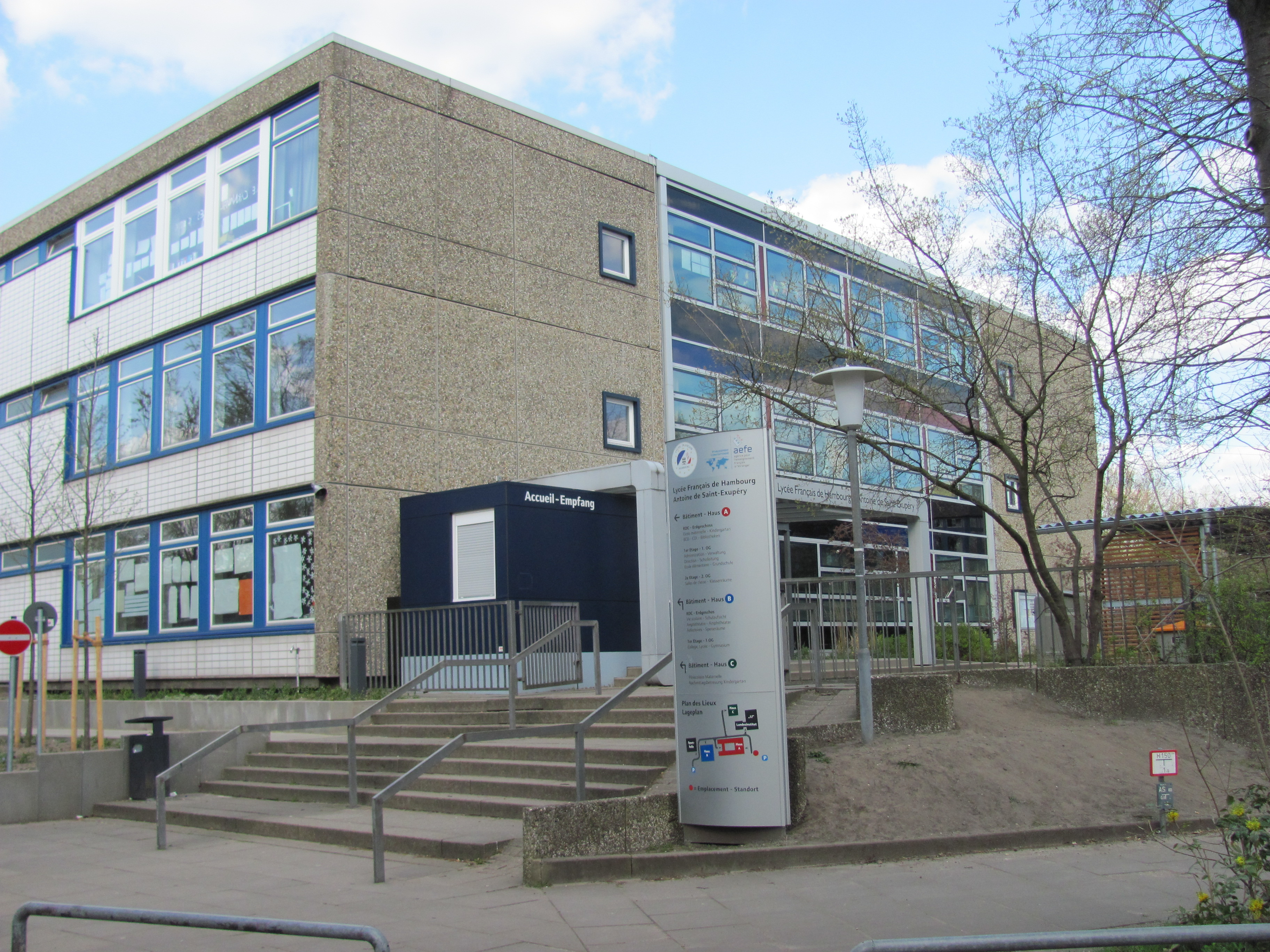
DFG / LFA Hamburg

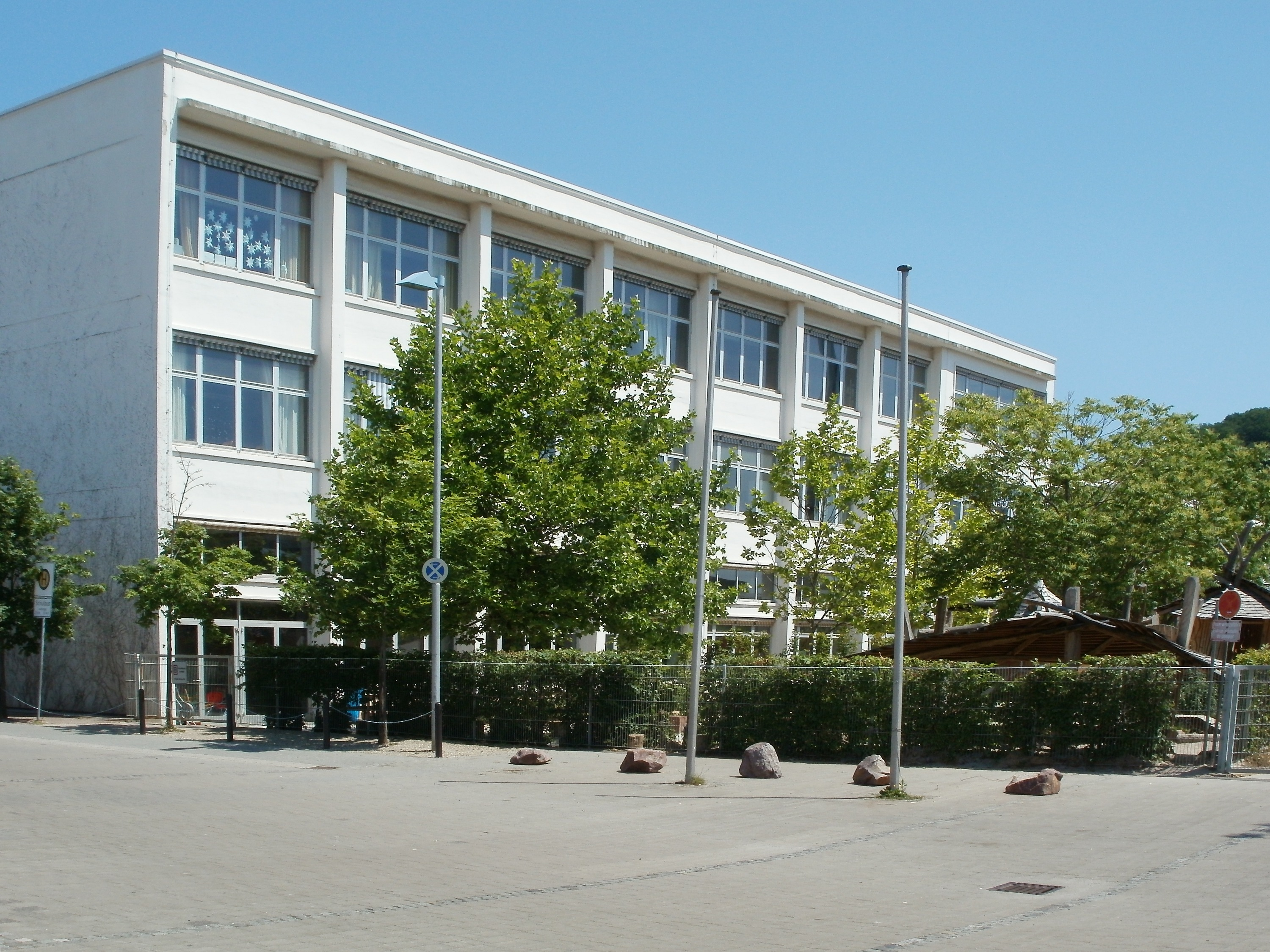
DFG / LFA Saarbrücken

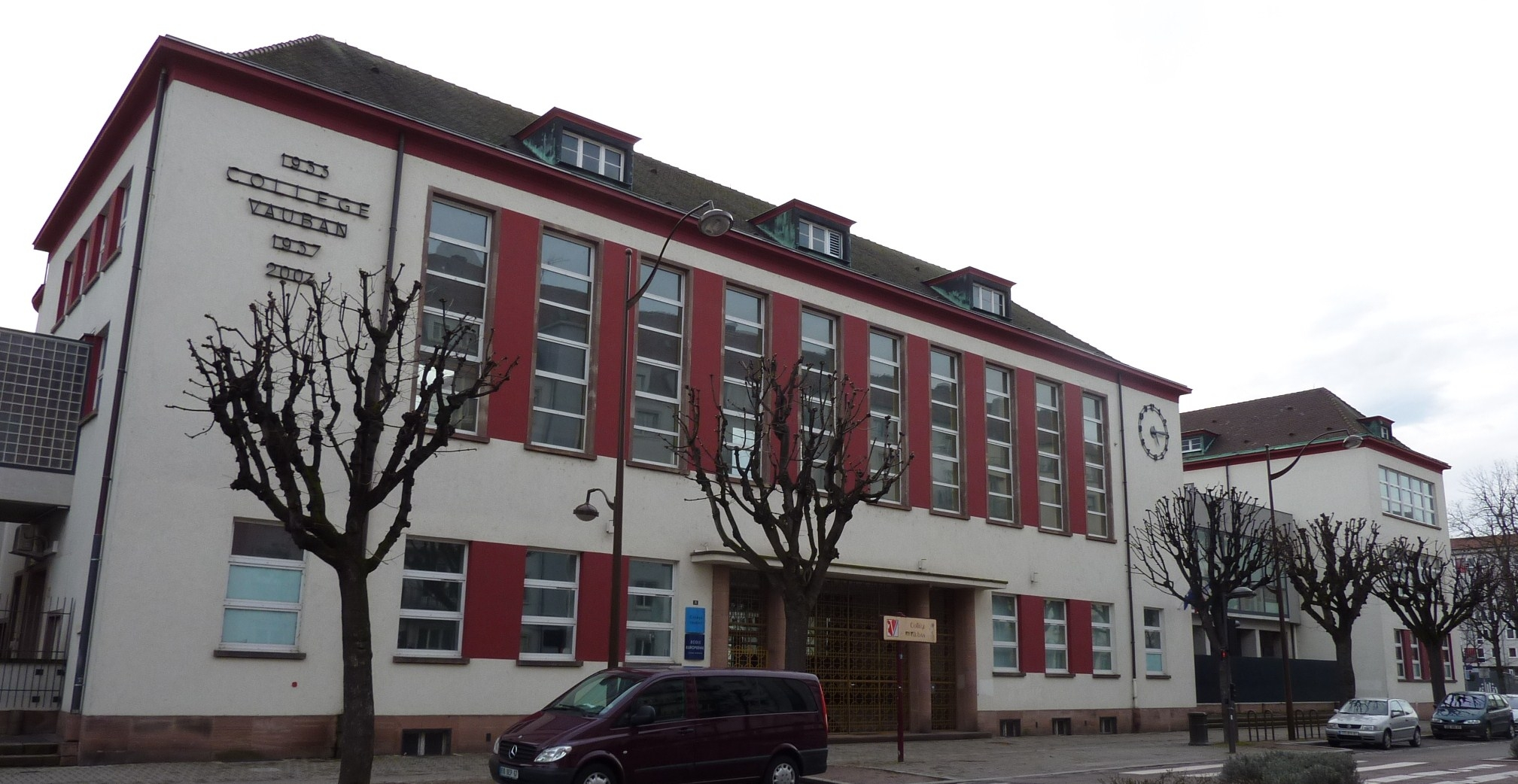
DFG / LFA Strasbourg

There are five French-German secondary schools known in German as Deutsch-Französisches Gymnasium (DFG) and in French as lycée franco-allemand (LFA). Mixing students, teachers and teaching methods of both countries, DFG/LFAs are highly selective schools of excellence. Their teachers are paid by the French and German states, and tuition is free of charge.

In the spirit of post-war friendship and two years before the signing of the conciliatory Éysée Treaty between West Germany and France, the first DFG/LFA was established in Saarbrücken in 1961 as a cooperation between a French and a German school. In 1972, an agreement signed between the two states formalised the DFG/LFA as a unified school form and introduced the French-German Baccalaureate. This agreement was last complemented by the French-German Schwerin Agreement of 2002.

The following DFG/LFAs are in operation, two in France:

- DFG / LFA Buc (opened in 1975), and
- DFG / LFA Strasbourg (2021),

and three in Germany:

- DFG / LFA Saarbrücken (1961),
- DFG / LFA Freiburg (1972), and
- DFG / LFA Hamburg (2020).

== Nomenclature ==
In German, the DFG/LFA school form is called Gymnasium, like the German secondary school type (years 5 to 12). In French, it is named lycée, after the French school form (years 10 to 12), although the schools also include collège (years 6 to 9; see education in France).

In English, one academic study called the school form "French-German School", and its final examinations "French-German Baccalaureate". Other publications in English called the school form "Franco-German high school" or "French-German high school".

== French-German Baccalaureate ==
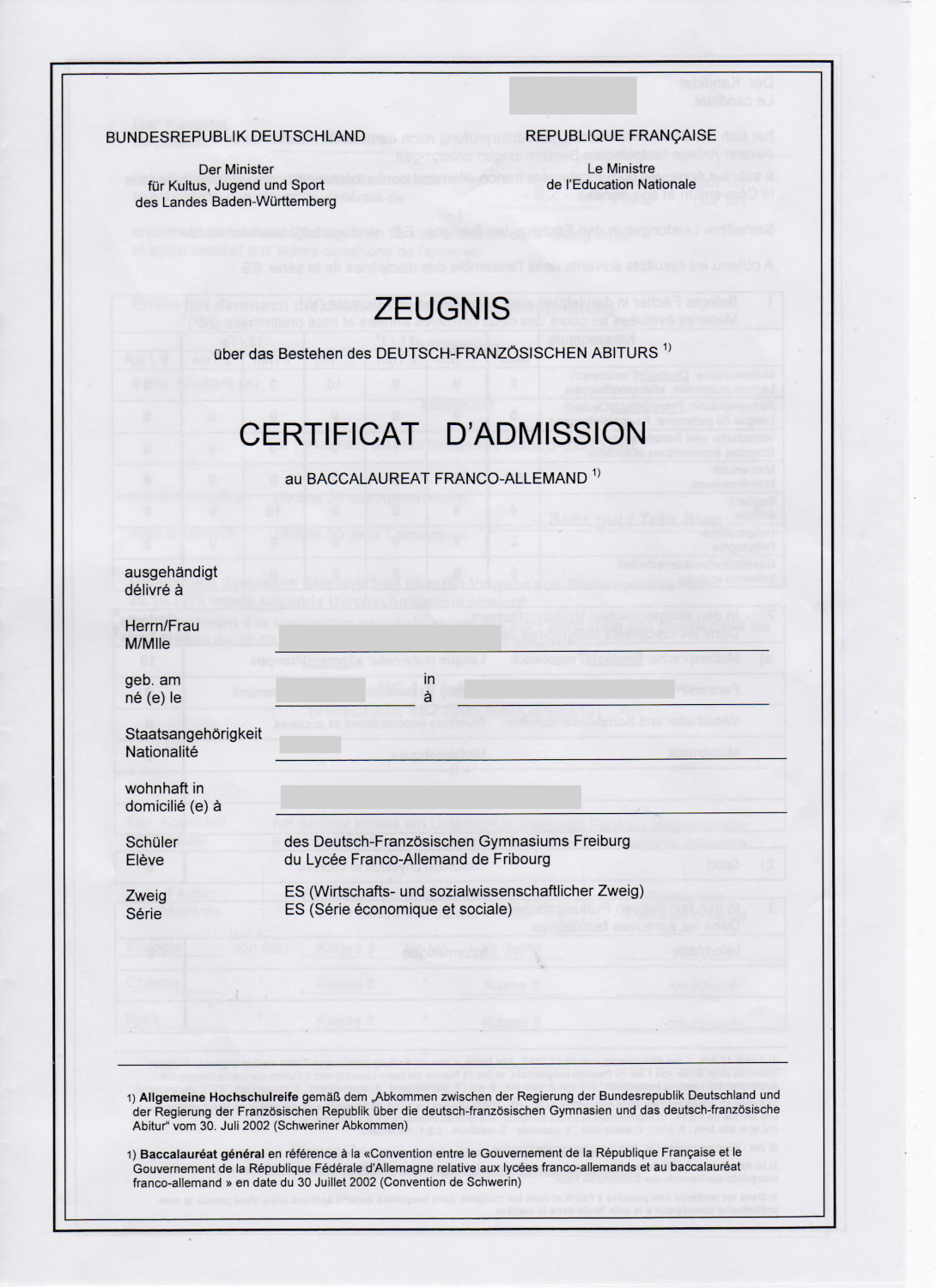
Title page of a French-German Baccalaureate

Students at DFG/LFA schools complete their education with the bilingual French-German Baccalaureate (deutsch-französisches Abitur / baccalauréat franco-allemand). The first French-German Baccalaureate exam was sat by students of the DFG Saarbrücken in 1972. The Baccalaureate is recognised by Germany as equivalent to the Abitur, and by France as equivalent to the Baccalauréat, and currently governed by an agreement signed by the two countries in Schwerin in 2002.

Students enter school in separate branches. The French-speaking branch takes seven years and starts with year 6 (sixième), whereas the German branch commences in year 5 (5. Klasse) already because German primary school finishes earlier. German speakers complete the French-German Baccalaureate after eight grades, making it an eight-year Abitur (some regular German schools take nine years instead). French-German co-tuition starts in year 6 and increases until year 9 (9. Klasse / troisième).

Years 10 to 12 are taught in equal shares of French and German. For these final years (Oberstufe / second cycle), students are divided into subject-specific branches. They choose between three branches: L (literary sciences), ES (economics and social sciences) and S (maths and natural sciences). The S branch is split into SMP, maths and physics, and SBC, biology and chemistry. This corresponds to the branch system of the French Baccalauréat géneral prior to the Bac 2021 reform. From the first French-German Baccalaureate in 1972 until 2002, there were only L, SBC and SMP branches. The Schwerin Agreement introduced the ES branch in the 2001–2002 academic year.

Year progression at DFG/LFA
Year	French branch	German branch
12	Terminale: French-German Baccalaureate	
11	1re (Première)	
10	2de (Seconde): Student chooses L, ES, SBC or SMP branch	
9	3e: French-German Brevet	9. Klasse
8	4e	8. Klasse
7	5e	7. Klasse
6	6e: Enrolment	6. Klasse
5	–	5. Klasse: Enrolment

DFG/LFA schools use a grade scale from 1 (worst) to 10 (best), which is different from both the German (6 to 1 and 0 to 15) and French scales (0 to 20, respectively). Furthermore, the final grade of the French-German Baccalaureate is based on a weighting different from both Abitur and Baccalauréat. The final Abitur grade is based on grades from years 10 to 12, while the Baccalauréat grade depends solely on final exam performance. The French-German Baccalaureate makes a compromise. Preliminary grades from years 10 to 12 count for 25 per cent of the final grade, and final exam performance makes up the remaining 75 per cent.

The French-German Baccalaureate is different from and sometimes confused with the AbiBac, a programme offered at regular French and German schools. The AbiBac programme is bilingual to a lesser extent than the French-German Baccalaureate. It consists of regular Abitur and up to eight periods weekly teaching in French, or regular Baccalauréat with up to eight periods in German.

== Other diplomas offered at DFG/LFAs ==
The DFG/LFA Buc also offers the British track of the Baccalauréat Français International (BFI, formerly called OIB), in its Section Internationale Anglophone.

=== Phase-out of former diplomas ===
The DFG/LFA Hamburg was an AbiBac school until 2020, and students admitted until the 2019/20 academic year still sit the AbiBac. The school admitted its first students on the French-German Baccalaureate track in 2020/21, and the first students will graduate with the French-German Baccalaureate in 2028.

In Strasbourg, the DFG/LFA was previously the German-speaking Section Internationale of the Lycée Vauban, leading to a French Baccalauréat with OIB German. Thus, students who entered prior to the 2020–21 academic year will still graduate with this diploma. They can also switch to the Lycée International des Pontonniers in Strasbourg and do the AbiBac instead. The first Strasbourg students will graduate with the French-German Baccalaureate in 2029.

== French-German Brevet ==
Regular French schools require their students to sit the Brevet diploma in 3e (troisième) (year 9) in order to finish collège. The same applies to DFG/LFA students in the French branch. They take a French-German version of the Brevet.

== Future ==
As of 2022, the French and German governments are working on an update to the 2002 Schwerin agreement governing the DFG/LFAs. Metz, the capital of the French Moselle border region, is a candidate for a sixth French-German School.

== See also ==
- European School, a school form of the European Union (either financed by the EU or EU-accredited and financed by a member state)
- German Europaschule, a German public school type which exists in various forms in several German federal states including the bilingual German-Polish School Löcknitz in Mecklenburg-Vorpommern
- German-Luxembourgish Schengen Lyceum Perl, a bi-national (albeit monolingual) school
- French bi-national high school programmes
  - AbiBac (French-German)
  - BachiBac (French-Spanish)
  - EsaBac (French-Italian)
- Language immersion, the overarching method of teaching in several languages (DFG/LFAs use two-way immersion)
