= Deutsch-Französisches Gymnasium Saarbrücken =

Deutsch-Französisches Gymnasium Saarbrücken / Lycée franco-allemand de Sarrebruck
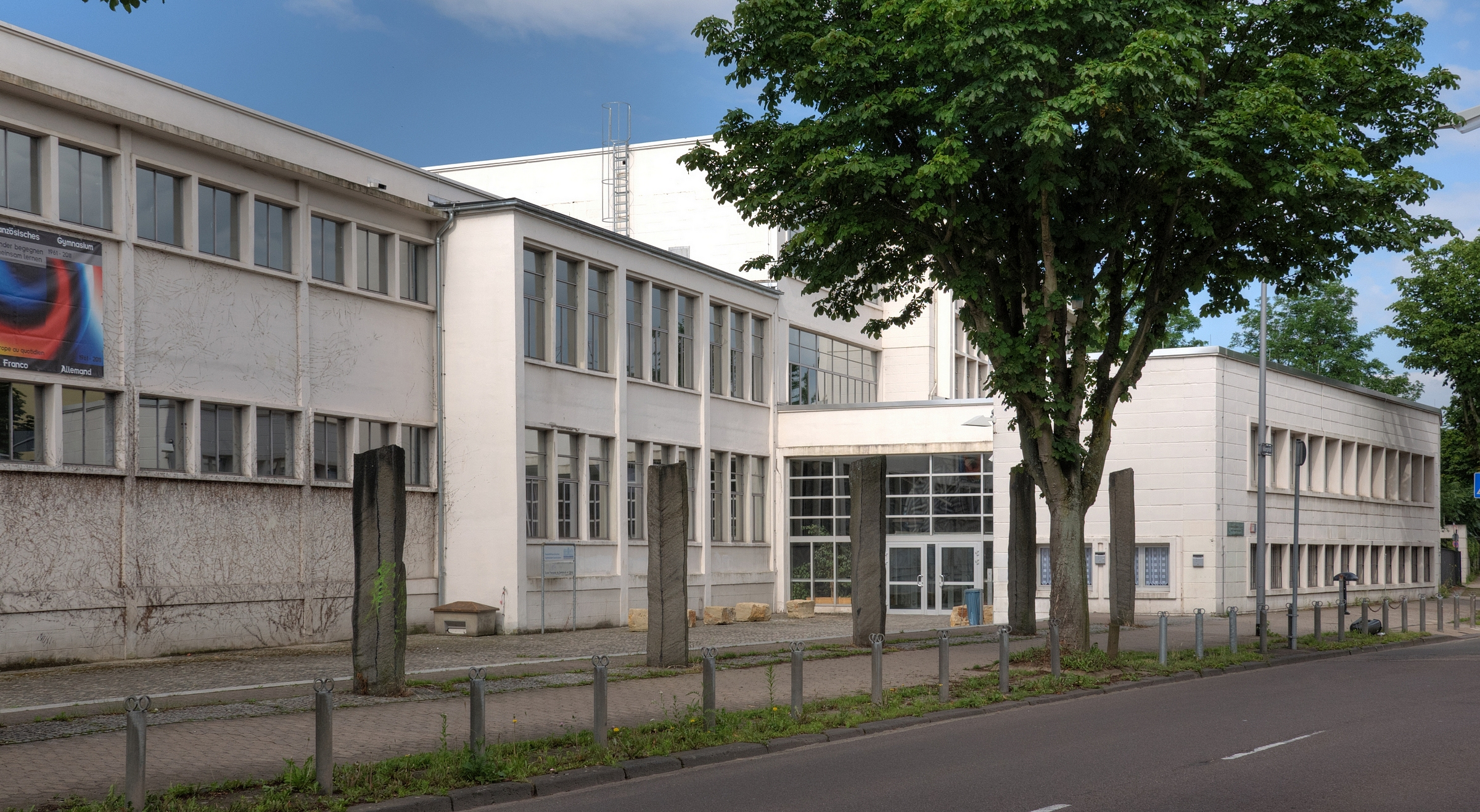
- DFG/LFA Saarbrücken

Location
- Saarbrücken; Germany
- Coordinates: 49.2301°N 7.0164°E

Information
- Type: French-German School (DFG/LFA)
- Opened: 25 September 1961 as a cooperation between a French and a German school (64 years ago)
- Principal: Stefan Hauter (Saarbrücken), Clarit Alofs (AEFE)
- Faculty: ca. 100
- Enrollment: over 1,000
- Newspaper: C'est la vie, Camäléon
- Website: dfg-lfa.org

DFG LFA Saarbrücken (French: Lycée Franco-Allemand de Sarrebruck, German: Deutsch-Französisches Gymnasium Saarbrücken is a French-German international gymnasium/collège and lycée (grades 5 to 12) in Saarbrücken, Germany. It is jointly administered by the French education agency AEFE and the local Regionalverband Saarbrücken district.

The school is one of the DFG / LFA established in the 1963 Élysée Treaty between France and West Germany; the school was established in 1961 as a cooperation between a French and a German school and later became one school.

The school's operation is detailed in the Schwerin Agreement signed by France and Germany in 2002. For instance, the students enter the school into a French or a German branch. They are integrated for the last three years before graduation, during which they are co-taught in both French and German. Students receive marks on a scale from 1 to 10, which differs both from the German and French school marks system.

== See also ==
- DFG / LFA
- La Gazette de Berlin

German international schools in France:

- Internationale Deutsche Schule Paris
- DFG / LFA Buc
- Deutsche Schule Toulouse
