= DFG / LFA Strasbourg =

French-German school in France

Coordinates: 48.582047°N 7.777817°E

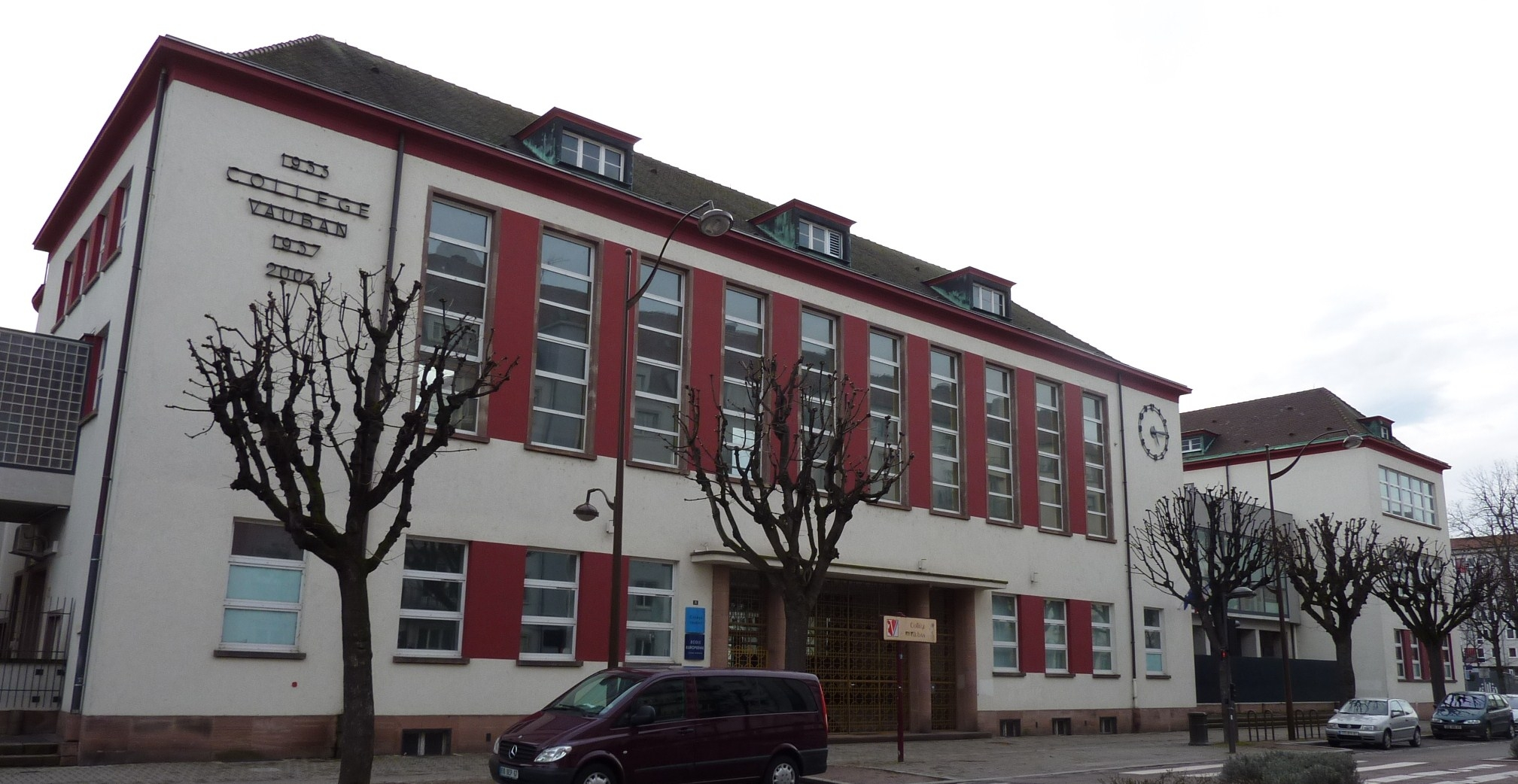
- Front building of the Collège Vauban and DFG/LFA Strasbourg
- 70 Boulevard d'Anvers, 67000 Strasbourg, France

Information
- Opened: 2 September 2021
- Enrollment: Circa 60 students in the entry grade (2021–22)
- Website: college-vauban-strasbourg.fr

The Lycée Franco-Allemand de Strasbourg (German: Deutsch-Französisches Gymnasium Straßburg, abbreviated as DFG / LFA Strasbourg) is a French-German public secondary school that opened in September 2021. It is the fifth DFG / LFA to open and the second of its type in France.

The school is run by the school authority (académie) of Strasbourg. It is situated on the premises of the Collège Vauban, an international school with Korean, Polish, and Portuguese international branches (sections internationales). The LFA Strasbourg replaced its German branch.

== History ==
The French minister of education, Jean-Michel Blanquer, announced the opening of the LFA Strasbourg at a French-German ministerial meeting on 25 January 2021. The French director of the other DFG / LFA in France, at Buc near Paris, learned of the Strasbourg LFA on the same day.

Students who wanted to join the LFA Strasbourg in the 2021–22 academic year had to sit an oral and written exam in German in March 2021. The school opened with the beginning of the school year of the Collège Vauban on 2 September 2021. The LFA Strasbourg started with around 60 school beginners, among around 170 enrolled at the Collège Vauban.

The DFG/LFA Strasbourg was previously the German Section Internationale of the Lycée Vauban and as such, its students entering until the 2020–21 academic year graduate with a French Baccalauréat with German Option Internationale du Baccalauréat (OIB). It is also possible to switch to the Lycée International des Pontonniers in Strasbourg and do the AbiBac. The first Strasbourg students will graduate with the French-German Baccalaureate in 2029.

Shortly after the opening, the French education minister at the time, Jean-Michel Blanquer, visited the school and said that his goal was to have more schools of this type in France. Metz, the capital of the French Moselle border region, is a candidate for a sixth French-German School.

== See also ==
- European School of Strasbourg
