= AbiBac =

French-German high school diploma

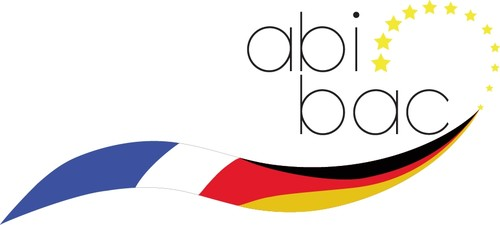
The AbiBac logo was developed by students of the Lycée Georges-Clémenceau de Montpellier and the Wentzinger-Gymnasium Freiburg in 2013.

The AbiBac is a French-German high school diploma offered in schools in France and Germany. It is the oldest of three bi-national high school programmes (sections binationales) introduced by the French state, the others being EsaBac (French-Italian) and BachiBac (French-Spanish). The AbiBac was created by a French-German agreement on 31 May 1994.

To obtain the AbiBac, German-speaking students take the Abitur exams in German, an exam in history or another social science subject in French, and an exam in French literature in French.

French speakers sit the Baccalauréat exams in French, an exam in histoire-géographie in German, and an exam in German literature in German.

== Schools ==
As of 2021, the French state offers the AbiBac at 88 schools in France and five schools (lycée français) in Germany. As of 2016, 68 public schools in Germany offer the AbiBac, as well as the two private schools Deutsche Schule Paris and Moser Schule Berlin.

== See also ==
- French-German Baccalaureate
- Other French bi-national high school programmes
  - BachiBac (French-Spanish)
  - EsaBac (French-Italian)
