= École Française de Hambourg =

Private international school in Hamburg, Germany

Coordinates: 53.6043°N 9.9577°E

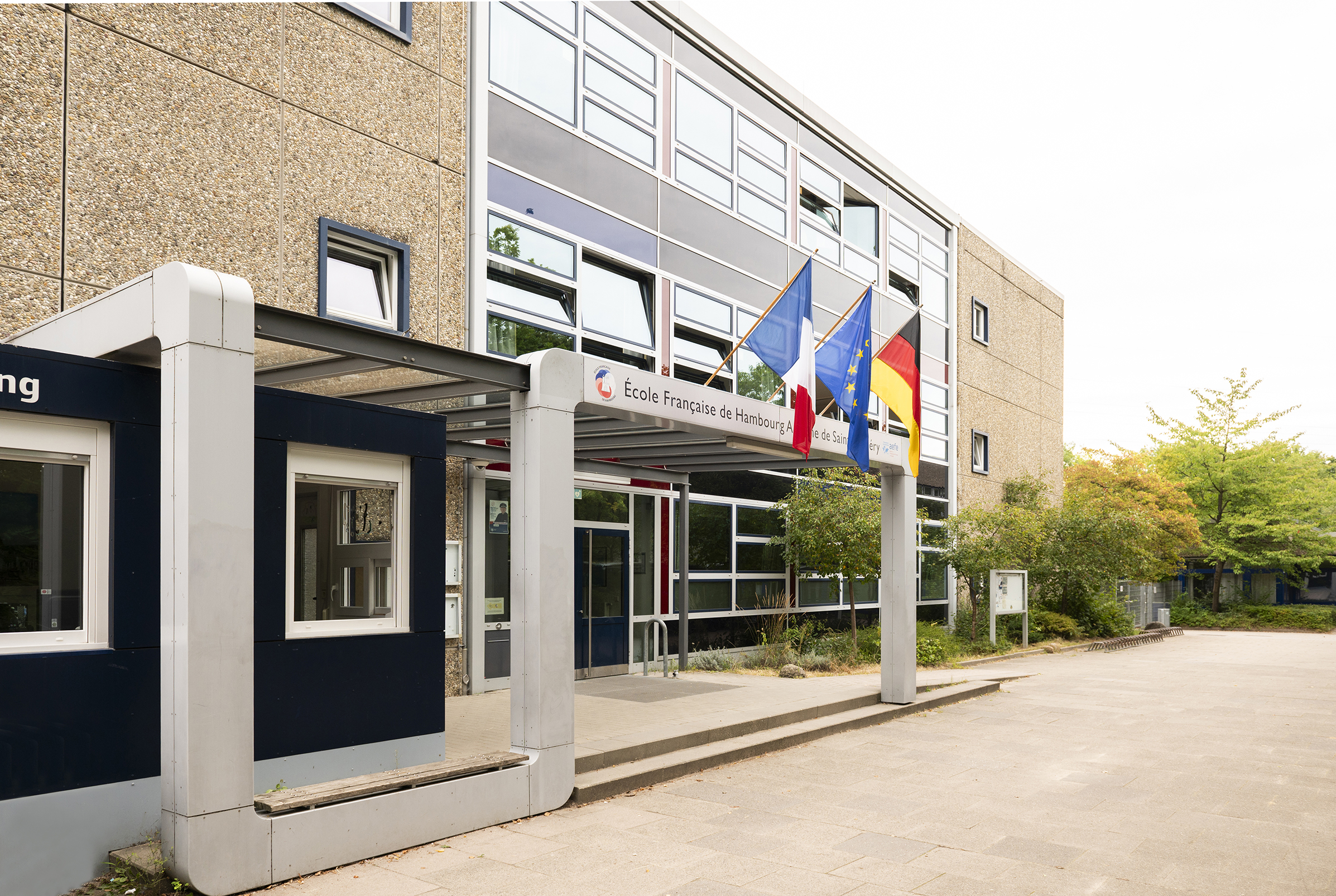
Main entrance

The École Française de Hambourg Antoine de Saint-Exupéry is a French international school in Hamburg, Germany, and is part of the Agency for French Education Abroad (AEFE) network.

The school offers a nursery school (école maternelle) and primary school (école primaire), both in French. Graduates have priority for entering the French-speaking branch of the DFG/LFA Hamburg, a French-German secondary school.

Until August 2020, the École Française was known as Lycée Français de Hambourg Antoine de Saint-Exupéry and also offered secondary education. At that point, the Lycée Français was split into the École Française and the DFG / LFA Hamburg.

The school is private and both approved by the French Ministry of Education and the educational authorities of Hamburg (as an Ersatzschule). It is run financially by a nonprofit German registered association (e.V.), whose board of directors is elected for 2 years. In 2020, the first class of the Franco-German high school opened, temporarily on the site of the French School of Hamburg, as the move of the Franco-German high school to a new school campus in the district of Altona is planned for 2026.

== See also ==
- Institut français de Hambourg
- La Gazette de Berlin
