= EsaBac =

EsaBac is a Franco-Italian secondary school double diploma program, signed on 25 February 2009 by Italian Minister of Education Mariastella Gelmini, and French Minister of National Education Xavier Darcos.

The agreement, in force since September 2010, allows Italian and French students to consequently obtain two high-school diplomas, Italian Maturità and French Baccalauréat.

== See also ==
- AbiBac (French-German)
- BachiBac (French-Spanish)
- European Baccalaureate
- French-German Baccalaureate
