= Hôtel de Ville, Colomiers =

Town hall in Colomiers, France

Hôtel de Ville
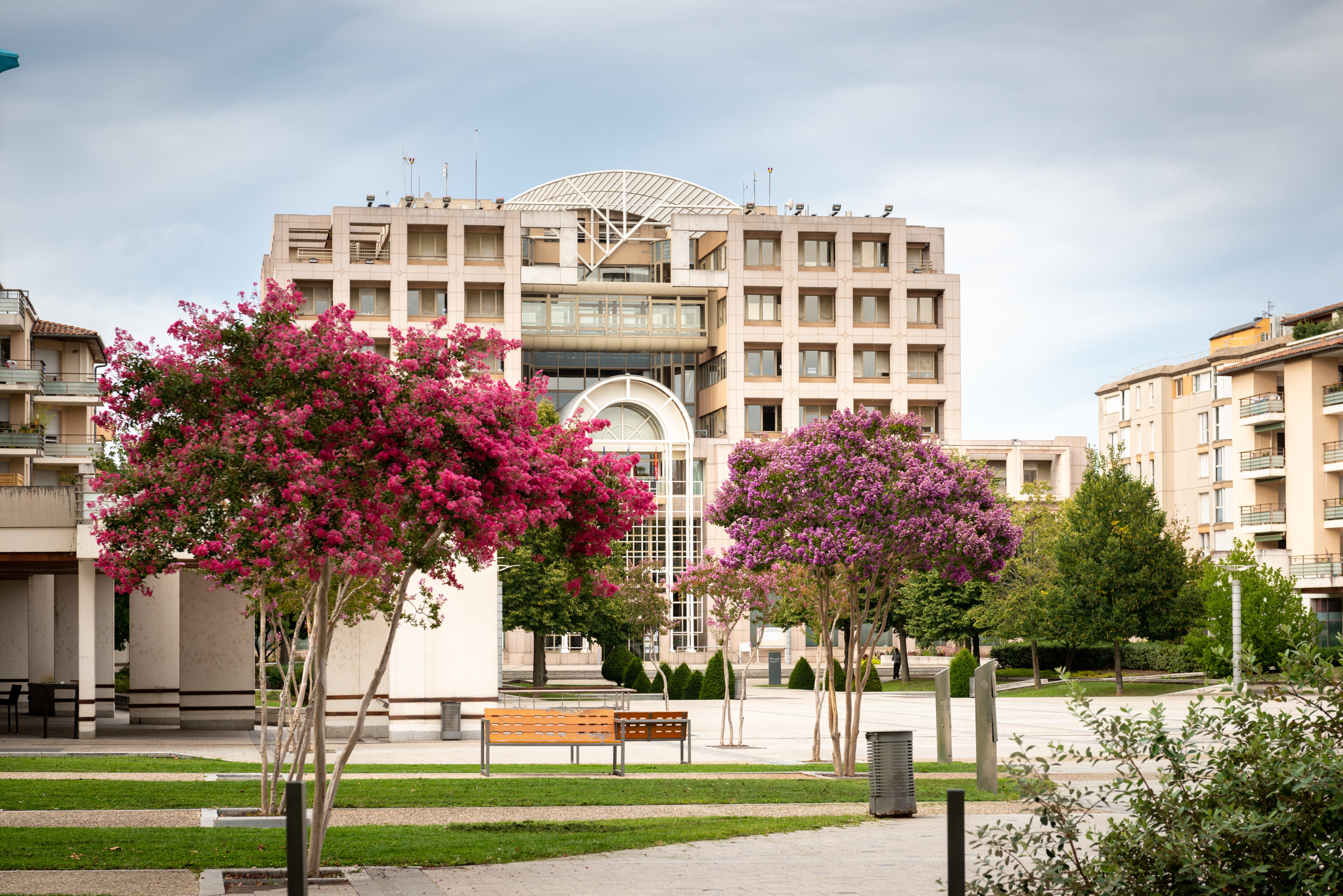
- The main frontage of the Hôtel de Ville in September 2019
- Interactive map of the Hôtel de Ville area

General information
- Type: City hall
- Architectural style: Modern style
- Location: Colomiers, France
- Coordinates: 43.6109°N 1.3347°E
- Completed: 1991

The Hôtel de Ville (French pronunciation: [otɛl də vil], City Hall) is a municipal building in Colomiers, Haute-Garonne, in southwestern France, standing on Place Alex Raymond.

== History ==
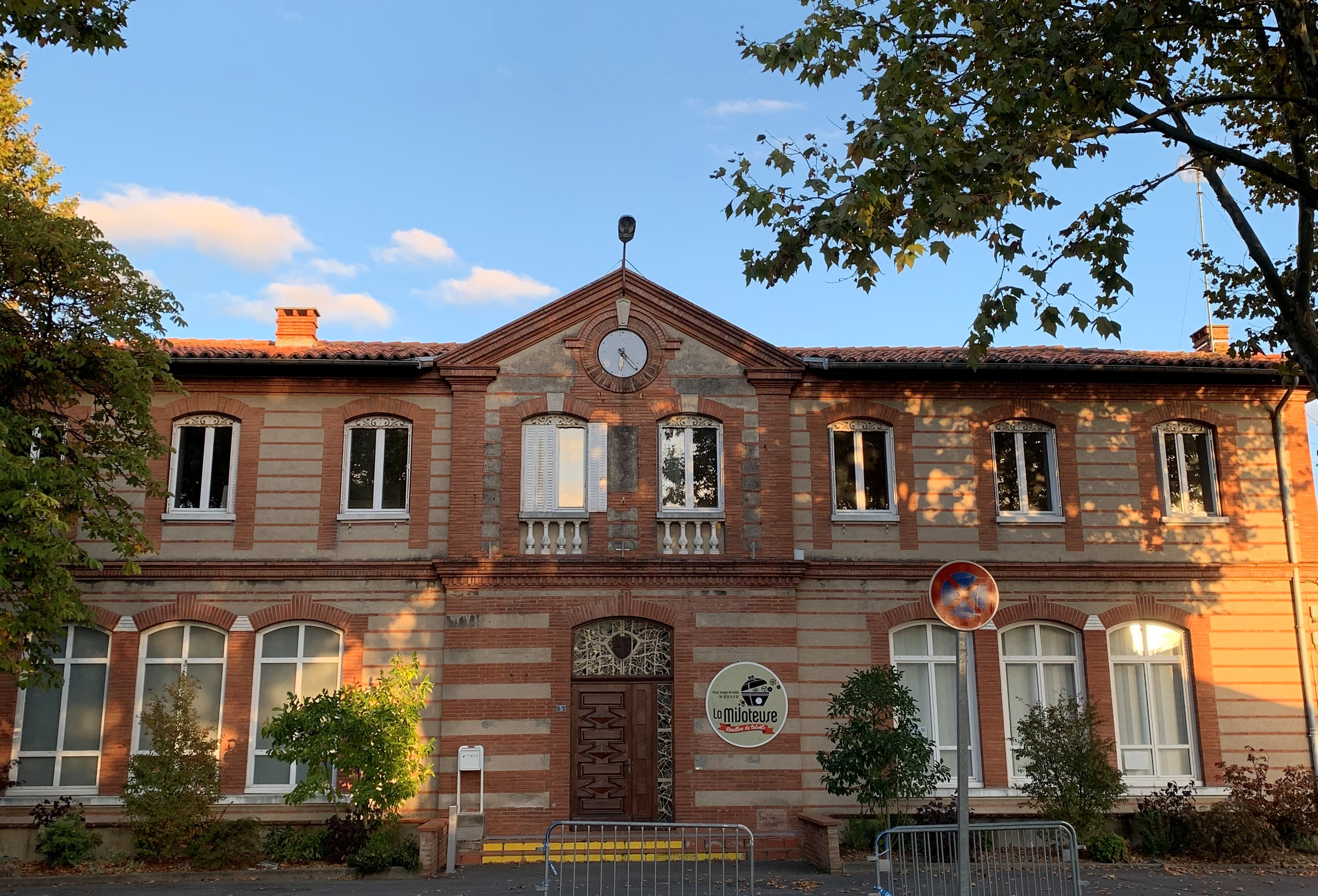
The second town hall

Following the French Revolution, the town council initially met at the clergy house. In the 1830s, the council decided to commission a municipal building to accommodate its own offices, a school and a prison for petty criminals. The site they selected was on the corner of Rue Gilet and what is now Place Joseph-Verseille. The first town hall was designed in the neoclassical style, built in stone and was completed in 1840. The design involved a symmetrical main frontage of seven bays facing onto the street. The central bay featured a square headed doorway on the ground floor and a French door with a balcony and iron railings on the first floor. The other bays were fenestrated by casement windows with moulded surrounds and keystones on both floors. There was a curved pediment with a clock in the tympanum above the central three bays. (Note: Although rebuilt in the first half of the 20th century, the successor building remained in educational use as the Jean-Macé Primary School until August 2009. It subsequently became the offices of the Caisse d'Allocation Familiale (Family Allowance Fund).)

In the early 1930s, the council decided to establish a dedicated town hall. The site they selected was at the east end of what is now Place Joseph-Verseille. The second town hall was designed in the neoclassical style, built in buff brick with red brick dressings and was completed in 1936. The design involved a symmetrical main frontage of seven bays facing west along Place Joseph-Verseille. The central bay featured a segmental headed doorway on the ground floor and a pair of segmental headed windows with keystones and balustrades on the first floor. The second-floor windows were flanked by red brick Doric order pilasters supporting an open pediment with a clock in the tympanum. The other bays were fenestrated by segmental headed windows on both floors with the ground floor windows set closer together. The second town hall was subsequently used as a public library, then as an arts centre and then as a centre for developing businesses known as La Mijoteuse (The Slow Cooker).

Following the liberation of the town on 19 August 1944 during the Second World War, the local liberation committee took control of the town hall and the French tricolour was then hoist from the flagpole.

After significant population growth, largely associated with the aircraft manufacturing industry, the council led by the mayor, Alex Raymond, decided to commission a modern town hall. The site they selected was in the new commercial part of the town, the masterplan for which had been prepared by René Viguier. The third town hall was designed in the modern style, built in concrete and glass and was officially opened by the minister for cities and planning, Michel Delebarre, on 17 October 1991. The design involved a symmetrical main frontage of 13 bays facing onto Place Alex Raymond. The central section of nine bays was seven storeys high and featured a large atrium in the central bay and was surmounted by a curved pediment reminiscent of the first town hall. The outer sections of two bays each were only three storeys high. The building was fenestrated by a series of square openings containing casement windows and it was clad in white tiles.
