= Colomiers =

Colomiers Colomèrs (Occitan)
- Commune
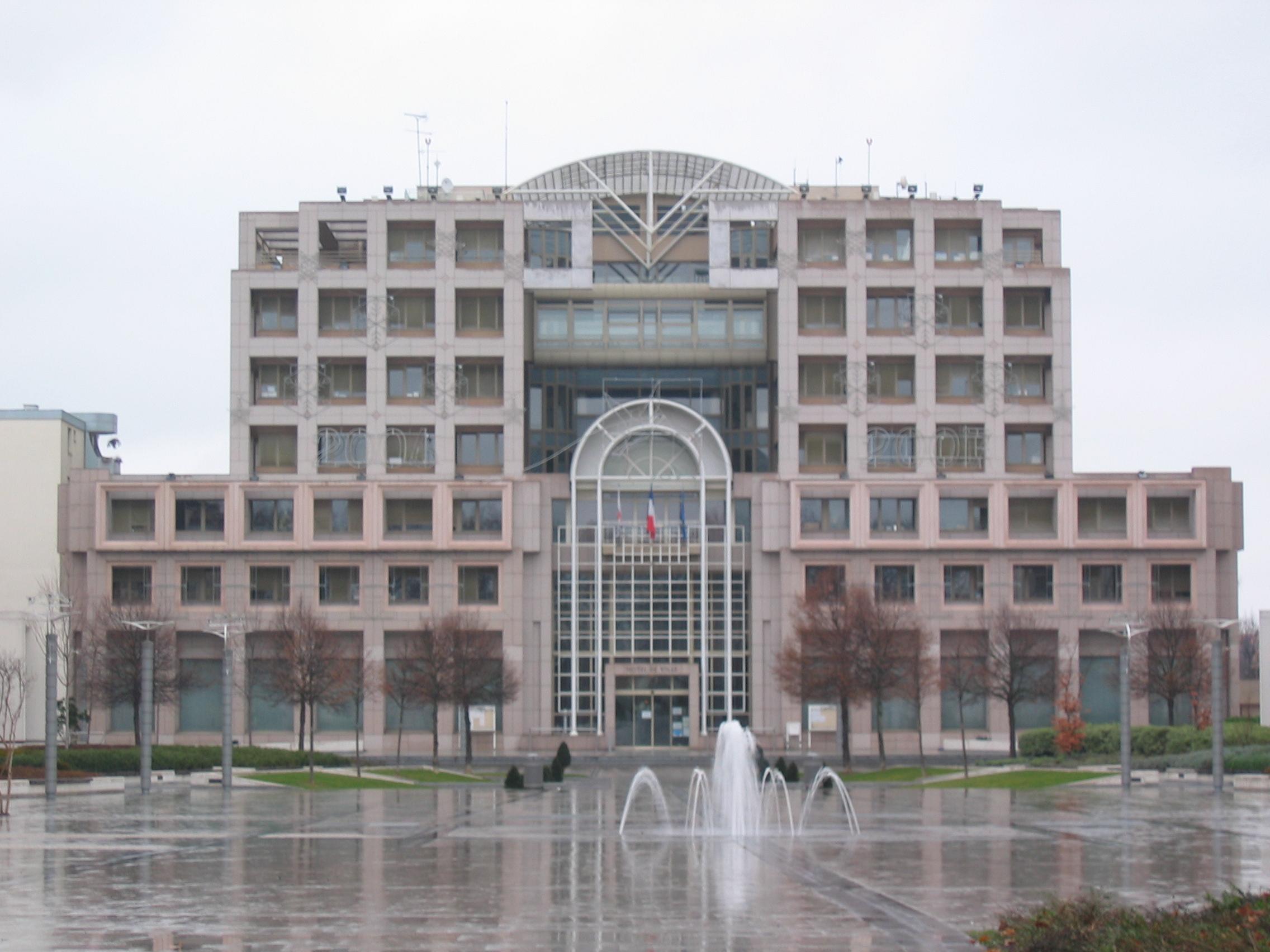
- The Hôtel de Ville

- Coat of arms
- Location of Colomiers
- Location within France Location within Occitanie
- Coordinates: 43°36′50″N 1°20′12″E
- Country: France
- Region: Occitania
- Department: Haute-Garonne
- Arrondissement: Toulouse
- Canton: Toulouse-7
- Intercommunality: Toulouse Métropole

Government
  - Mayor (2020–2026): Karine Traval-Michelet
- Area^{1}: 20.83 km^{2} (8.04 sq mi)
- Elevation: 160 m (520 ft)
- Highest elevation: 191 m (627 ft)
- Lowest elevation: 145 m (476 ft)
- Population (2023): 40,882
  - Density: 1,963/km^{2} (5,083/sq mi)
- Time zone: UTC+01:00 (CET)
  - Summer (DST): UTC+02:00 (CEST)
- INSEE/Postal code: 31149 /31770
- ^{1} French Land Register data, which excludes lakes, ponds, glaciers > 1 km^{2} (0.386 sq mi or 247 acres) and river estuaries.

Colomiers (French pronunciation: [kɔlɔmje]; Occitan: Colomèrs; Languedocien dialect: Colomièrs) is a commune in the Haute-Garonne department in the Occitania region in Southwestern France. With a population of about 40,000, it is the largest suburb of the city of Toulouse, to which it is adjacent on the west side. Colomiers is part of Toulouse Métropole.

== History ==
The Hôtel de Ville was completed in 1991.

== Demographics ==
The inhabitants of the commune are known as Columérins (masculine) or Columérines (feminine).

Historical population

Year	Pop.	±% p.a.
1793	1,080	—
1800	1,155	+0.96%
1806	1,227	+1.01%
1821	1,247	+0.11%
1831	1,149	−0.82%
1836	1,338	+3.09%
1841	1,325	−0.20%
1846	1,456	+1.90%
1851	1,456	+0.00%
1856	1,414	−0.58%
1861	1,576	+2.19%
1866	1,634	+0.73%
1872	1,716	+0.82%
1876	1,712	−0.06%
1881	1,710	−0.02%
1886	1,716	+0.07%
1891	1,623	−1.11%
1896	1,689	+0.80%
1901	1,720	+0.36%

Year	Pop.	±% p.a.
1906	1,732	+0.14%
1911	1,829	+1.10%
1921	1,556	−1.60%
1926	1,640	+1.06%
1931	1,821	+2.12%
1936	1,860	+0.42%
1946	2,122	+1.33%
1954	3,195	+5.25%
1962	4,607	+4.68%
1968	10,584	+14.87%
1975	20,126	+9.62%
1982	23,326	+2.13%
1990	26,979	+1.84%
1999	28,538	+0.63%
2007	32,315	+1.57%
2012	36,699	+2.58%
2017	38,951	+1.20%
2023	40,882	+0.81%

Source: EHESS and INSEE (1968–2023)

== Transport ==
In 1971 it became the first area of France to offer zero-fare public transport, but had to cancel this project in 2016.

== Education ==
There are nine public preschools (maternelles) and six public elementary schools. There are four public junior high schools (collèges): Léon Blum, Victor Hugo, Jean Jaurès, and Voltaire. There are two public senior high schools, Lycée International Victor Hugo and Lycée des Métiers de l'électrotechnique, de la maintenance et Chaudronnerie Eugène-Montel.

There is an international school in Colomiers (International School of Toulouse or IST) which is run by Airbus and which prepares for the International Baccalaureate, and, within the international lycée, a German school (Deutsche Schule Toulouse, DST). English 31, supported by Airbus, provides English-language tuition.

There is also a private preschool, elementary and middle school, Institution « Sainte-Thérèse ».

== Sport ==
US Colomiers is a French rugby union club based in Colomiers.

== See also ==
- Communes of the Haute-Garonne department
