= Wentzinger-Gymnasium Freiburg =

Coordinates: 48.0139°N 7.8238°E

Location
- Falkenbergerstr. 21; Freiburg im Breisgau; Germany

Information
- Type: Grammar school
- Established: 1972
- Principal: Joachim von der Ruhr
- Enrollment: 970
- Website: www.wentz-gym.de

The Wentzinger-Gymnasium Freiburg is a grammar school in Freiburg, Germany, that not only has a scientific and a linguistic profile, but is one of only 38 schools in Baden-Württemberg that has a music profile and also has a bilingual profile for French, which leads to the AbiBac, a double high school diploma. At present, around 1,000 pupils are taught at the Wentzinger grammar school, most of them from the city of Freiburg and the district of Breisgau-Hochschwarzwald (Black Forest). The name of the grammar school refers to the Freiburg artist and honorary citizen Johann Christian Wentzinger (1710–1797). The school returned to a nine-year curriculum. The so-called G8 curriculum that leads to the High School diploma in only eight years instead of nine, is no longer offered. This applies for all new registrations. Ongoing G8 classes are maintained.

== History and location ==
One part of the school was opened in 1972. Two years later, the whole building complex was completed, including the grammar school and a comprehensive school. Wentzinger grammar is the second-biggest grammar school, and the comprehensive one is the biggest of the secondary schools. Both schools work independently of one another under their own management. They use the science, technical and music rooms together, as well as the gym and the outside sports facilities. They cooperate in several areas and make many decisions together.

The building complex is located within a public recreation area, the venue of the State Garden Show of Baden-Württemberg in 1986. The comprehensive school is situated in the southern part, and the grammar school is in the northern part of the building complex. The gym, the outside sports facilities and the swimming pool "Westbad", frequently used by the pupils, are all nearby. The building also accommodates a branch of the public library.

Good cycling route lead in the direction of Landwasser, Lehen, Betzenhausen and the city center. School buses or regular buses ensure a connection to all the western districts of Freiburg, namely Umkirch, Hochdorf, Tuniberg and March. The train station is only a few minutes walk away. The Wentzinger Gymnasium is the first public grammar school in Freiburg that, starting with the school year 2013/2014, returned to the G9 course system, offering A-Level, after completion of the 12th grade in Germany.

== Organization and subjects offered ==
The Wentzinger grammar school offers various languages as well as music and a natural science profile. In the 5th grade, pupils have the choice between English and French, as well as a French bilingual class in which French is the first foreign language. Also, the music profile can be selected in the 5th grade. In the 6th grade, pupils choose a second foreign language: those who have English as their first foreign language can choose between French and Latin; those who have French as their first foreign language or come from a French bilingual class must choose English as their second foreign language.

Starting from the 9th grade, pupils have to choose a particular profile. The language profile offers Spanish as a third foreign language. In the natural science profile, students take Science and Technology. It is also possible to choose music as a profile subject, as long as the pupil has taken the music profile in elementary school or shows musical talent. The subjects are main subjects, and are four hours per week. Starting in high school, pupils can choose their main subjects according to Baden-Württemberg regulations.

== Music profile ==
The Wentzinger grammar school offers children who are interested in music the possibility of taking a special course with additional music lessons. The music lessons are primarily intended to encourage joy and interest in music and to understand music in its various manifestations; practically (singing, playing an instrument, improvisation, movement, etc.) and in looking at the music of different epochs and cultures. A further seminar on the theory of music complements this. In addition to lessons in the classroom, pupils are also free to participate in workshops (currently a choir, an orchestra, a big band and rhythmicity classes). The learning of an instrument is desired, but not a condition for attending additional music lessons.

From 5th to 7th grade, three or four hours of music per week are planned, with additional creative music projects. From 8th to 10th grade, music is a profile subject and thus a regular core subject (such as a third foreign language). In high school, it is possible to qualify for the final examination after graduating from a course in music.

== Personalities ==
Famous pupils:

- Ekkehard Stärk (1958–2001), classical philologist
- Julia Söhne (*1993), former chairwoman of the Young Socialists in the SPD (Jusos)
