= International School of Toulouse =

Private international day school in Toulouse, France

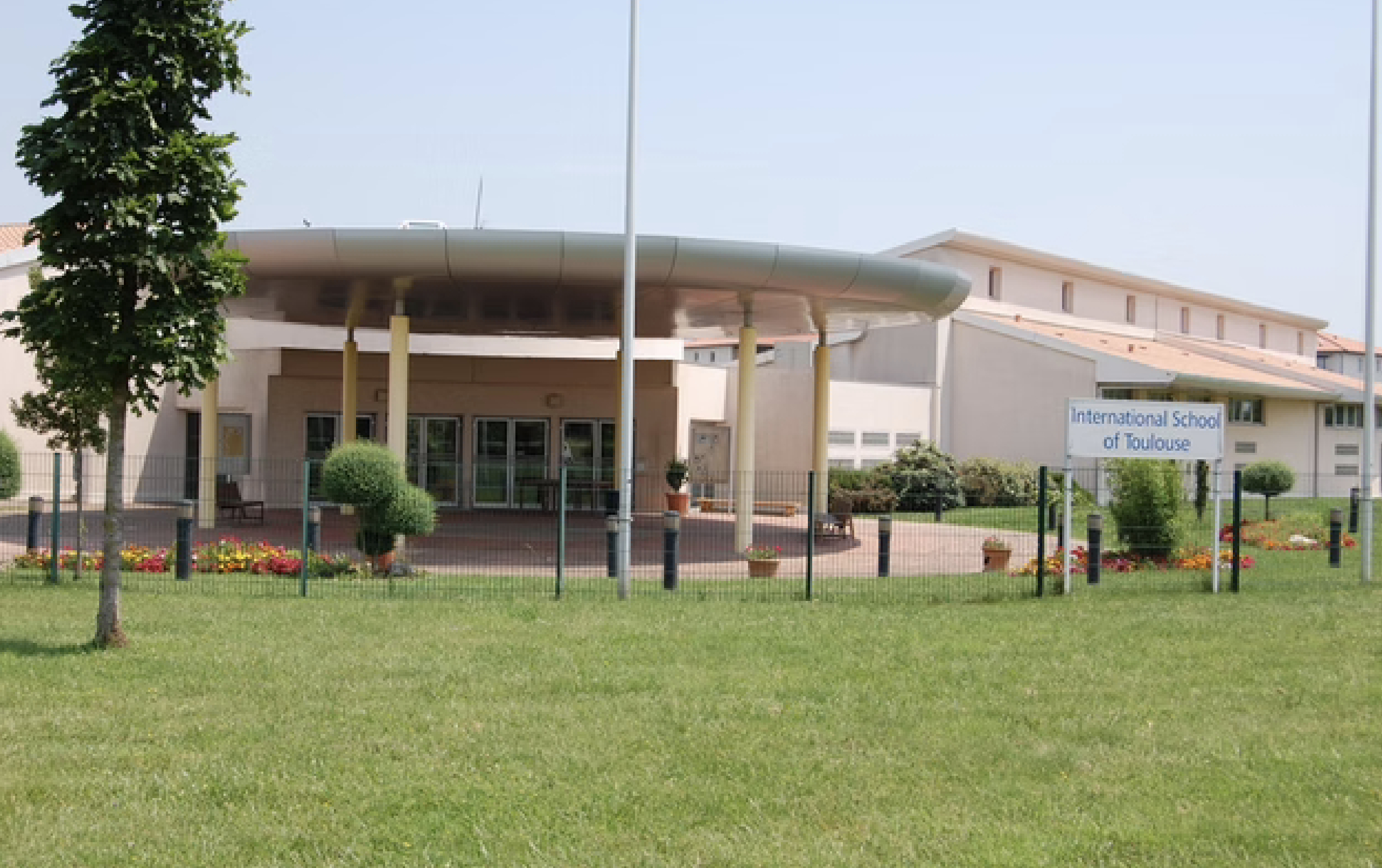

Location
- Colomiers; Haute Garonne; 31770; Toulouse, Midi Pyrénées, 31770; France
- Coordinates: 43.61484°N 1.3032°E

Information
- School type: Private – International
- Established: 1999
- Principal: Mrs R Leonard
- Age: 4 to 18
- Enrollment: approx. 500
- Colours: Red; Navy
- Website: intst.eu

The International School of Toulouse (IST) is a private, co-educational international day school located in Colomiers, near Toulouse in south-west France. It serves students aged 2½ to 18 and delivers an English-language curriculum with French taught across all levels. The school offers the International Baccalaureate Primary Years Programme (PYP) and Diploma Programme (IBDP), a bespoke Middle School curriculum, and IGCSE examinations in Grades 9 and 10.

IST is accredited by the Council of International Schools (CIS) and the New England Association of Schools and Colleges (NEASC), and is authorised as an IB World School by the International Baccalaureate Organisation.

The school enrols students from more than thirty nationalities, including families connected to the aerospace industry and the wider international community of the Toulouse region.

It is located in Colomiers, near Toulouse, in the Haute Garonne department of France.

== History ==
The International School of Toulouse (IST) was founded in 1999 at the request of Airbus to support the educational needs of its internationally mobile workforce. The school opened with a small cohort and rapidly expanded as the aerospace industry in the Toulouse region grew. Its purpose was to provide an English-medium, internationally oriented education for families arriving from Europe, Asia, and the Americas, reflecting the global profile of Airbus employees.

In the early 2000s, IST moved to its purpose-built campus in Colomiers, designed to accommodate a rising enrolment and a broadening curriculum. The school later became part of the “Eurocampus,” a shared educational site with the Deutsche Schule Toulouse, enabling collaboration between the two institutions and joint use of facilities.

IST introduced the International Baccalaureate Diploma Programme as its upper-secondary qualification and progressively added inquiry-based curricula across other year levels. The school was first accredited by the Council of International Schools (CIS) and the New England Association of Schools and Colleges (NEASC) in 2011, receiving full re-accreditation in 2021.

In 2024 the school celebrated its 25th anniversary, marking a quarter-century of service to the international community of the Toulouse metropolitan area. Local press reported that IST had grown to more than 500 students representing over thirty nationalities, reflecting the continued importance of the aerospace industry to the region.

== James Rao Live Your Dream Foundation ==
The James Rao Live Your Dream Foundation was established in 2016, two years after the death of International School of Toulouse alumnus James Rao. The foundation provides financial support of up to €4,000 per recipient to enable students to travel to a chosen destination and participate in educational or culturally focused activities. It also offers support to charities such as Flying Scholarships for Disabled People.

As of 2025, the foundation has supported 30 students in undertaking projects in locations such as Fiji and the Galápagos Islands. The 2026 application cycle has recently been launched.

== Practical Pedagogies Conference ==
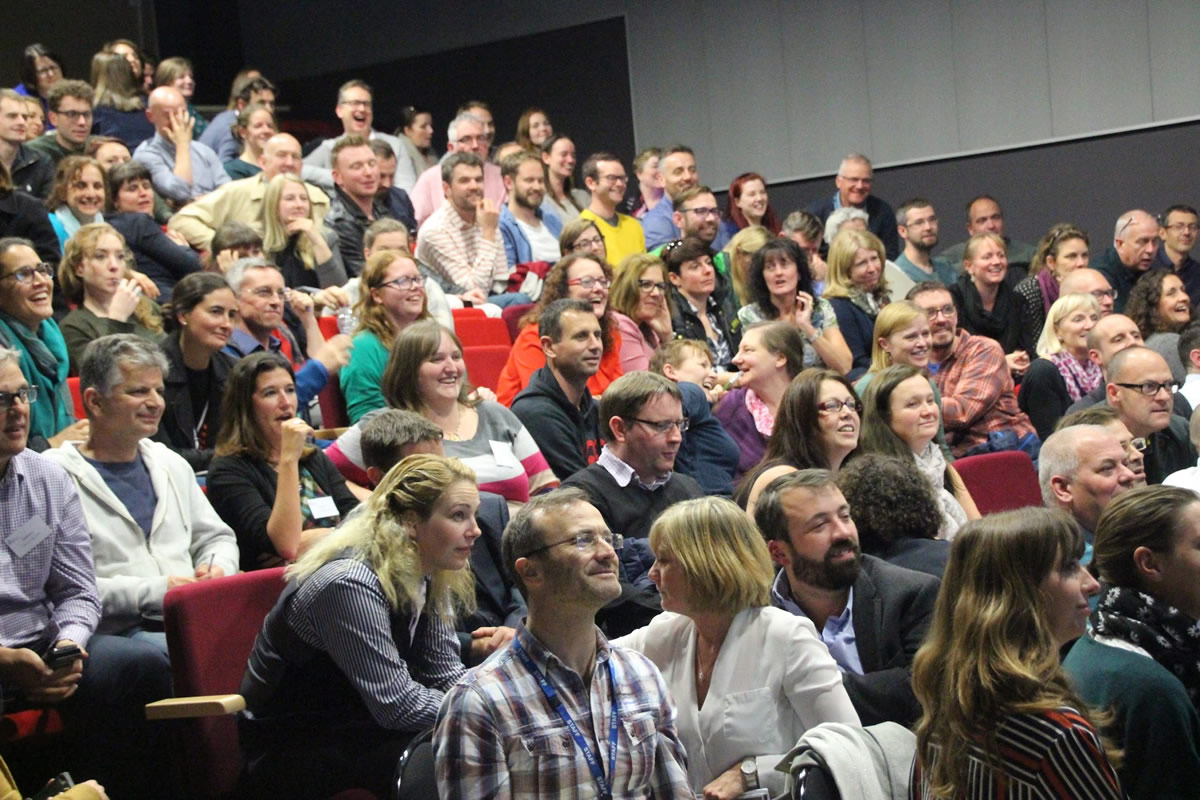
Practical Pedagogies Conference

Since 2015, the International School of Toulouse has hosted the Practical Pedagogies conference, an international professional development event for educators. The conference was established to provide a forum for sharing teaching methods and approaches. It attracts participants from various countries who exchange ideas and explore new educational practices.

Practical Pedagogies brings together teachers from a range of subjects, school systems, and educational backgrounds. Presenters share classroom practices, research-informed strategies, and techniques that participants may implement in their own teaching. Sessions typically focus on methods for enhancing learning, promoting student engagement, and integrating technology in education. Workshops are interactive, encouraging collaboration and reflection.

Over time, Practical Pedagogies has become one of the larger teacher-led professional development conferences in Europe. The next event is scheduled to take place at the school in October 2026.

== Alumni Association ==
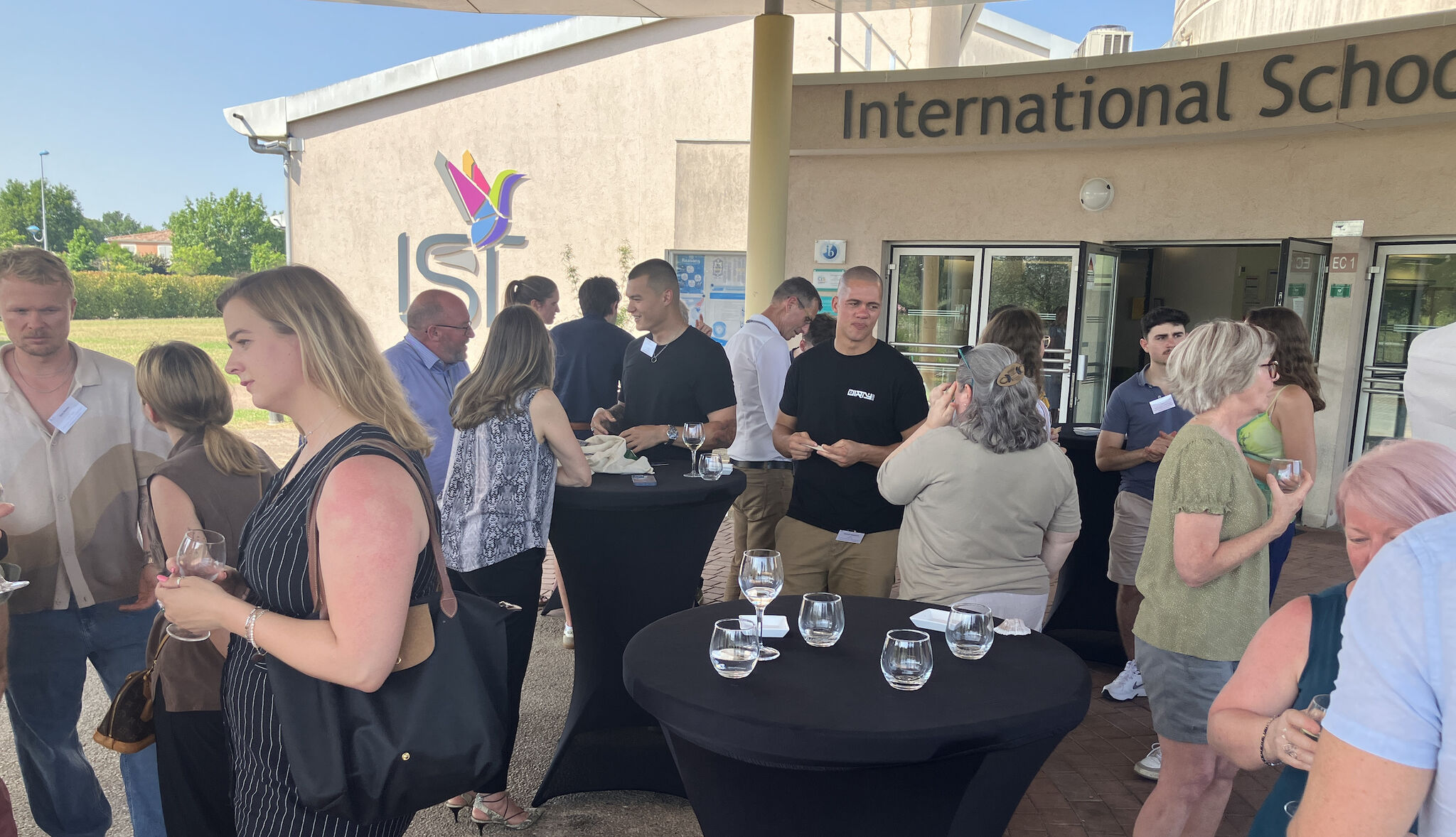
IST Alumni at the 25th Anniversary Celebrations

The International School of Toulouse (IST) Alumni Association is an organisation that connects former students, staff, parents, and other members of the school community. The association was created to facilitate ongoing contact between alumni and the school, as well as to support communication among former members of the IST community. Its membership includes individuals living in various countries and working in a wide range of professional fields, who have connected through a dedicated group using LinkedIn.

The association provides opportunities for alumni to participate in activities such as professional networking, mentorship initiatives, social gatherings, and collaborative projects. It also acts as a channel for sharing news, updates, and information related to alumni achievements and developments at the school. Through these activities, the IST Alumni Association aims to maintain links between past and present members of the school community and to encourage continued engagement with the institution.

== International Day ==
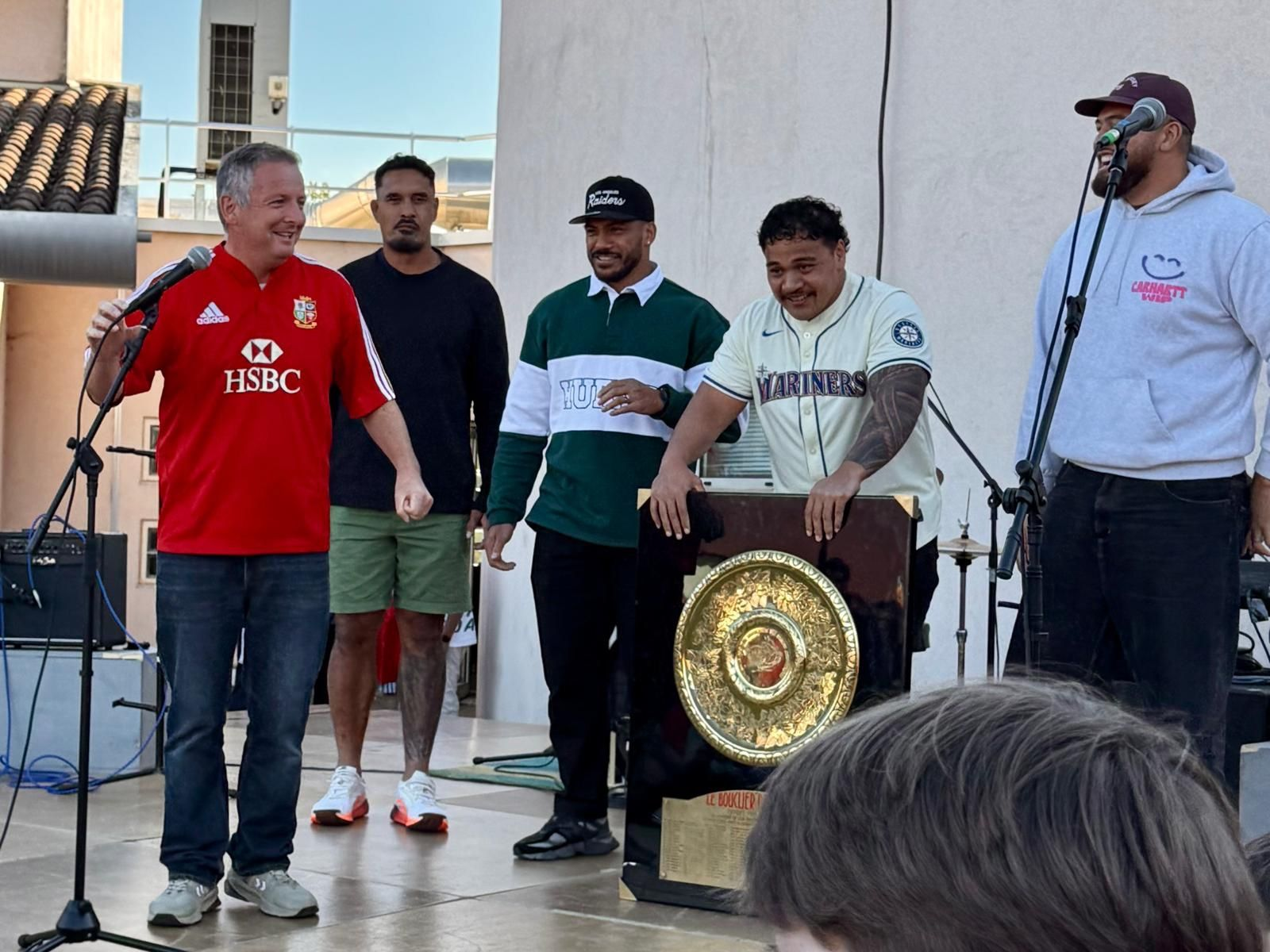
Stade Toulousain Rugby Club Presenting Prizes

The International School of Toulouse holds an annual event known as International Day, which highlights the cultural diversity of the school community. The event typically includes a parade of nations, during which students wear clothing associated with their countries of origin and carry national flags. This event was first launched as part of the school's 25th anniversary celebrations.

Classrooms and shared areas are used for cultural displays featuring music, dance, language, art, and other traditions. Families and staff members often contribute to these presentations by preparing exhibitions, performances, or activities linked to their cultural backgrounds. An international food fair is usually part of the programme, offering dishes from various countries prepared by members of the school community. Recent activities have included collaboration with the French rugby club Stade Toulousain.

International Day is intended to promote awareness of global cultures and to provide opportunities for students to learn about the backgrounds and traditions of their peers. The event forms part of the school’s broader activities aimed at fostering intercultural understanding and community engagement.

== Performing arts ==
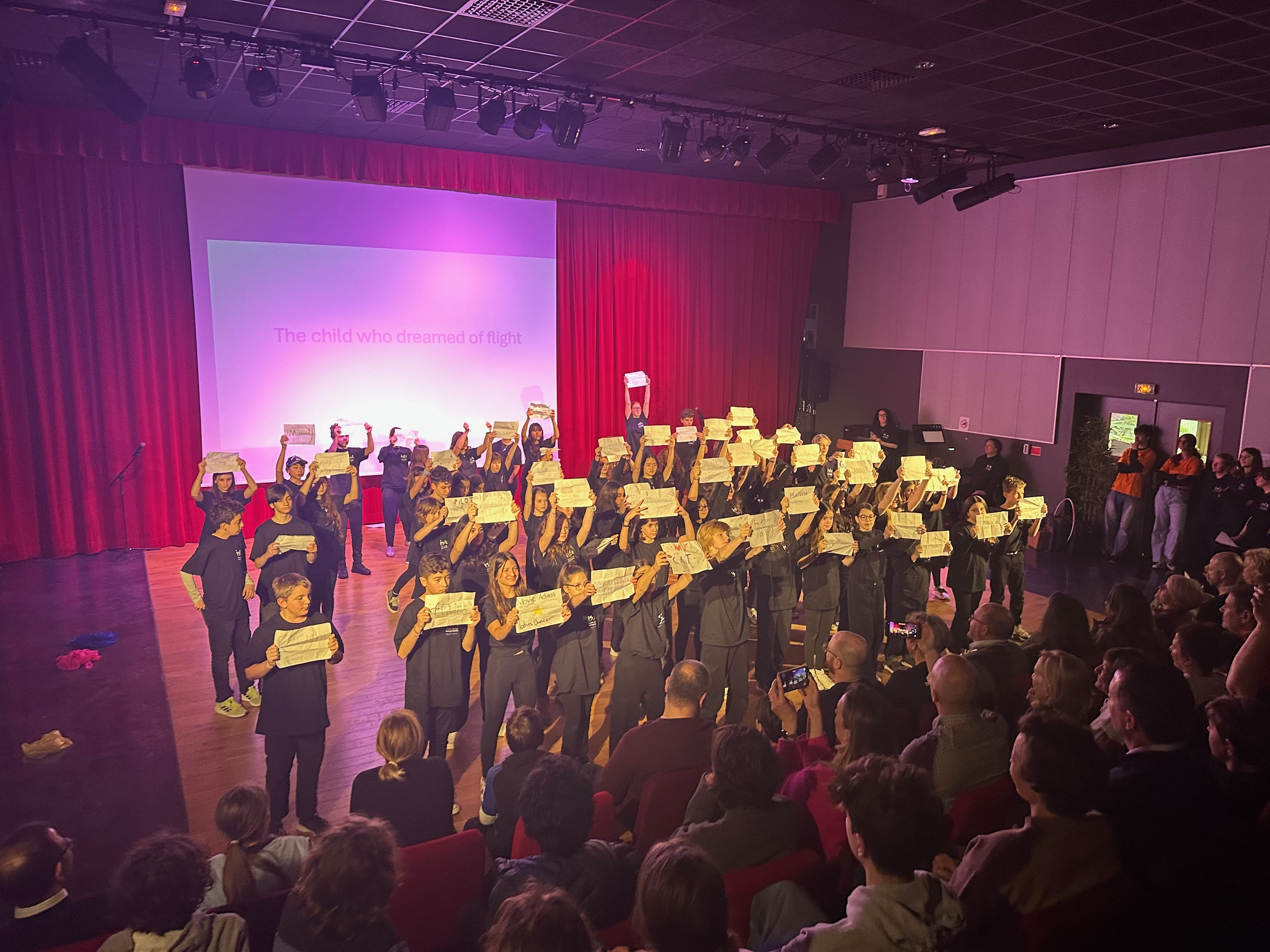
ISTA festival at the International School of Toulouse

The school is a member of the International Schools Theatre Association (ISTA), an organisation that connects young performers and educators through collaborative theatre experiences. Drama and theatre teachers from the school have accompanied students to ISTA festivals and workshops held across Europe, where participants engage in workshops, rehearsals, and performances with peers from various cultural and linguistic backgrounds.

In 2025, the International School of Toulouse hosted its own ISTA festival. The event involved visiting schools, artists-in-residence, and student performers for several days of workshops, rehearsals, and performances. Hosting the festival enabled the school community to contribute to the artistic programme and participate in the international theatre network.

The school also stages annual musical productions. In 2025, this was Peter Pan, involving 52 students from its lower secondary (collège) section. Older students from the school (lycée) also contributed, performing in the orchestra and assisting with makeup, costumes, and stage sets. The production was modernized with themes relevant to youth while retaining an international message, and it ran over four days.

== Extra-curricular activities ==
=== Model United Nations ===
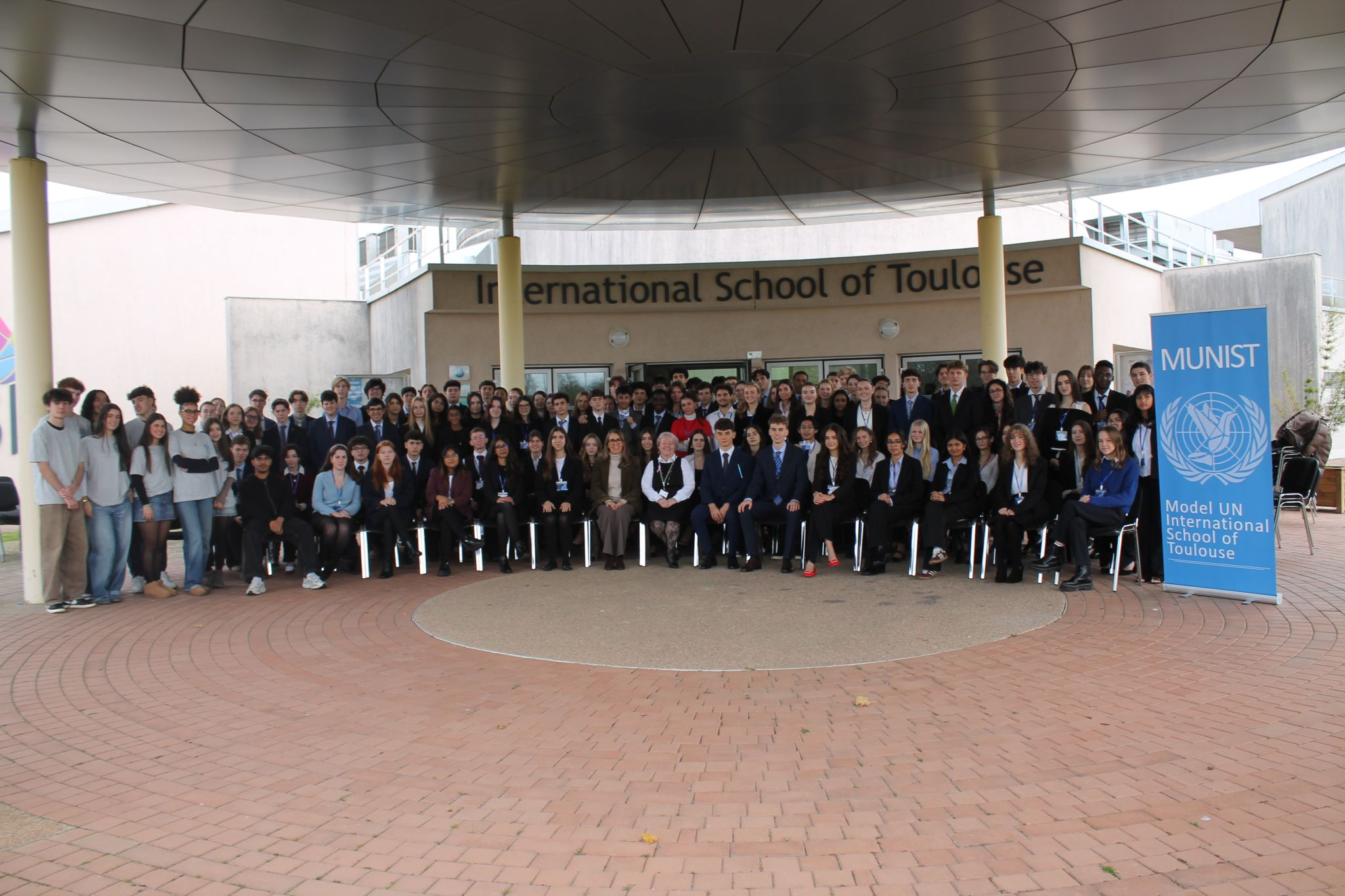
Inaugural MUN event at IST, November 2025

The school operates a Model United Nations (MUN) programme and has participated in conferences in several European countries. A school-hosted conference took place over three days in November 2025, involving schools from the local area - Victor Hugo (Colomiers), Lycée Nelson Mandela (Pibrac), Lycée Françoise (Tournefeuille) - as well as schools from further afield such as the International School of Lyon, Ermitage International School (Paris) and CLIP - Oporto International School (Portugal).

=== Sports Day ===
The school holds an annual Sports Day that involves students from across the primary and secondary sections. The event typically features track-and-field activities, team sports, and inter-house competitions designed to encourage participation and physical activity. Students compete in mixed-age groups, and staff assist in organising and supervising events throughout the day, which usually culminates in a synchronised dance involving the entire school on the sports pitch. The Sports Day is a regular part of the school calendar and forms part of its wider physical education and co-curricular programme.

=== Eco-Schools ===
The International School of Toulouse holds Eco-School accreditation. Sustainability initiatives within the school include environmental awareness activities and student-led projects.

=== Trips and outdoor learning ===
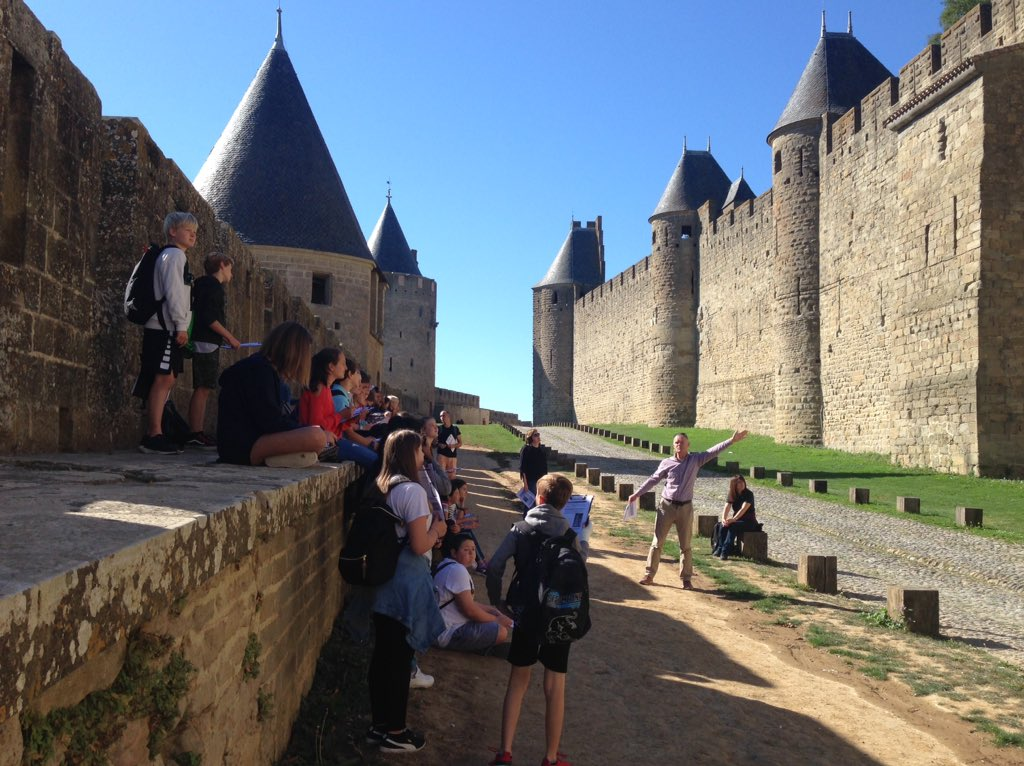
Grade 7 Humanities Trip to Carcassonne

The International School of Toulouse includes a programme of curriculum-related trips and residential visits across the Secondary School. These activities support subject learning and provide opportunities for outdoor education.

==== Grade 6 ====
Grade 6 students take part in an annual residential trip, typically to the Atlantic coast or the French Pyrenees. The visit focuses on outdoor activities and supports the transition into Secondary School.

==== Grade 7 ====
Grade 7 students participate in a humanities field trip to Carcassonne, where they study geographical and historical features of the site. They also join Grade 6 on a residential trip to the Atlantic coast or the Pyrenees.

==== Grade 8 ====
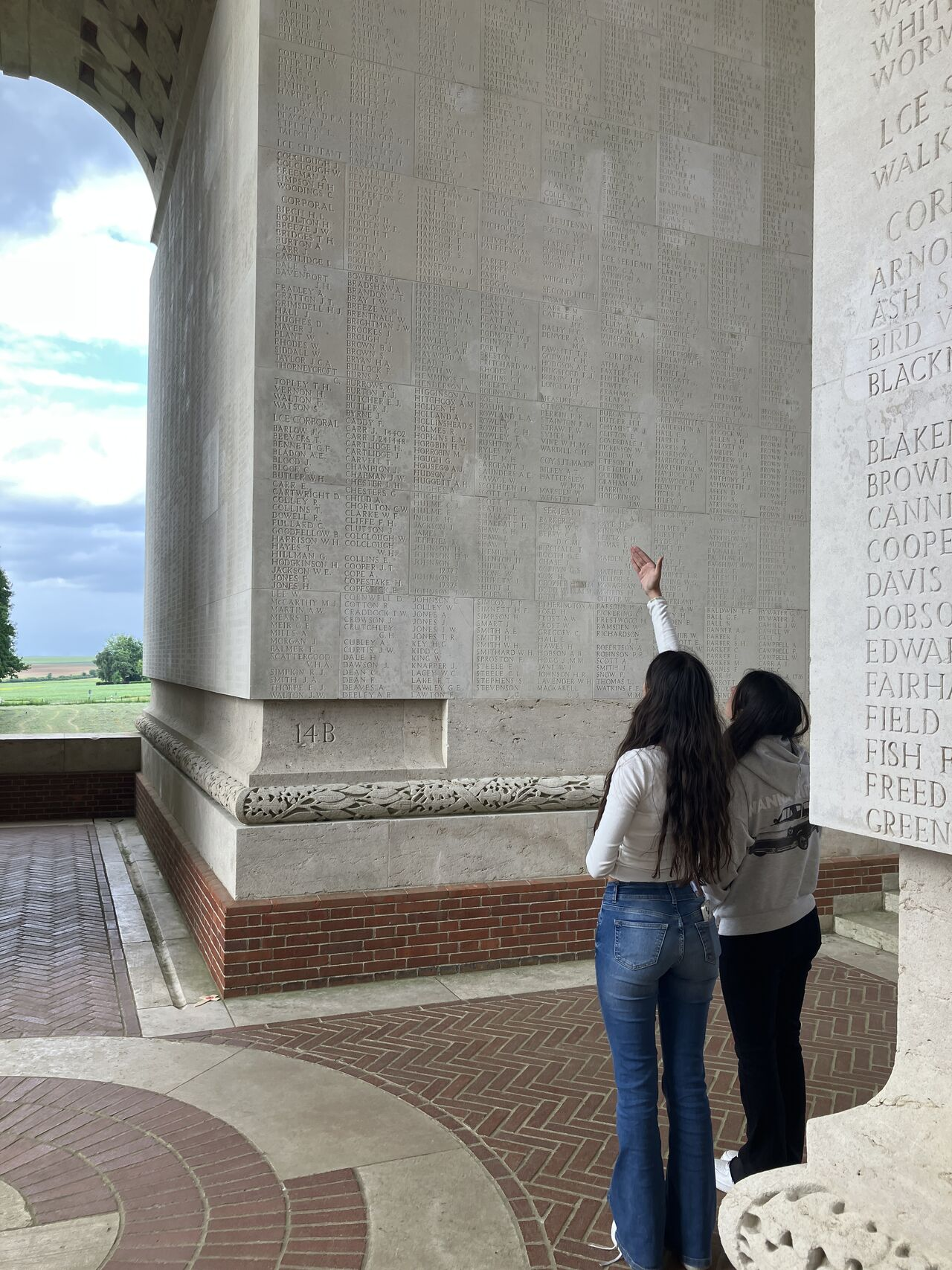
Grade 8 Battlefields Trip

Grade 8 students take part in a week-long Battlefields trip to Belgium or Normandy. The visit relates to their study of First World War and Second World War history.

==== Grade 9 ====
In the summer term, Grade 9 students undertake a four-day interdisciplinary visit to Barcelona. The trip includes elements of geography, history, business and art.

==== Grade 11 ====
Grade 11 students complete an outdoor education and team-building experience in the Pyrenees, supporting collaborative skills and preparation for the International Baccalaureate Diploma Programme.

==== Morocco (biennial trip) ====
The school runs a biennial trip to Morocco for Secondary School students. The visit includes time in Marrakech, an excursion to the Agafay Desert and hiking in the High Atlas Mountains. As part of the trip, students visit the Education for All foundation in Imlil to learn about the organisation's work and to see how funds raised by the school community have supported the charity.

== Controversy ==
On 23 December 2006, Richard Jones-Nerzic, a former teacher at IST, was dismissed. This decision raised concern that it had been taken to remove a union representative from the staff, since some other SUNDEP members were previously dismissed. His dismissal from the IST, in connection with the dismissal of another teacher, sparked adverse comment from teachers, students, ex-students and parents. In January 2010, Richard Jones-Nerzic became the fourth teacher to win a case for unfair dismissal against the school.
