= BachiBac =

French-Spanish secondary diploma

The BachiBac is a high school diploma offered at schools run by the French and Spanish states. It gives alums the same access to Spanish and French universities as the two countries' regular high school diplomas, Bachillerato and Baccalauréat. The first students started studying for the BachiBac in the 2010-11 school year.

The BachiBac consists, depending on the school, of either the Bachillerato or the Baccalauréat, with history and geography lessons in the partner language and intensive partner language classes during the last three years of high school. The extra classes amount to 7 hours of weekly teaching in year 10 (seconde / 4.º E.S.O.), and 8 hours in years 11 and 12 (première, terminale / 1.º, 2.º de bachillerato).

The programme was created by a 2008 agreement between Spain and France.

== Schools ==
The BachiBac is offered at 120 Spanish state schools in Spain and at the Liceo Español in Paris (France). As of 2021, the French state offers the BachiBac at 97 state schools in France and at the École française de La Havane in Cuba.

== See also ==
- Education in France
- Education in Spain
- AbiBac (French-German)
- EsaBac (French-Italian)
- European Baccalaureate
- French-German Baccalaureate
