= English 31 =

French English-teaching association

English 31 is a not-for-profit association, based in Toulouse area, providing English education to 6- to 18-year-old bi-lingual students schooled in the French system. It is a voluntary association in France (Association loi 1901) working in partnership with the Éducation Nationale and supported by its principal industrial partner, Airbus. It offers the teaching of English within the French school system to pupils who are fluent English speakers. Four to six hours of lessons a week are given by native English-speaking teachers with British teaching qualifications. The main aims are to develop reading and writing skills and an understanding of English-speaking culture.

Primary level education is offered at the École Primaire Lucie Aubrac in Colomiers. Pupils aged six to ten (CP to CM2) have four hours weekly, working on reading and writing skills.

Secondary education is organised in partnership with the Collège and Lycée Victor Hugo. Pupils at the collège have six hours a week of English literature and history in English. Pupils at the Lycée Victor Hugo prepare for the International Baccalauréat.

== About ==
The Section Internationale organises and delivers English lessons to children whose mother tongue is English, or who have proven spoken and written fluency in the language, and who are integrated into the French school system.

The broad aim is to maintain a child's proficiency in English while she or he progresses through the French educational system. The bilingual system also enables a pupil to re-integrate into an English-speaking educational system whenever necessary and at whatever level, or to continue within the French educational system up to university level.

=== Organisation ===
The Section Internationale operates in the following schools, all in Colomiers:

- Primary (école élémentaire) Ecole primaire Lucie Aubrac (ages 6 – 11)
- Secondary (collège) Collège Victor Hugo (ages 11 – 15)
- Secondary (lycée) Lycée International (ages 15 – 18)

A programme of English integrated into the weekly programme at Lucie Aubrac exists at Primary level only. At secondary level, pupils must be registered full-time in the appropriate school in which English lessons are organised.

=== The lessons ===
At primary level, in the integrated programme, four hours of lessons are provided per week, incorporated into the standard French Primary timetable (24 hours per week). In the weekly programme 2 ½ hours of English are provided per week on Wednesday afternoon. At collège level, six hours of lessons are provided per week, incorporated into the standard French collège timetable, taking place when French pupils learn English as a foreign language. At lycée level four hours of English are provided per week in Seconde and Première, incorporated into the standard French lycée timetable. This rises to six hours in Terminale if students decide to take the Option Internationale du Baccalauréat (OIB) in English.

== Schools ==
=== Lycée Victor Hugo ===
The lycée Victor Hugo, a state Lycée Polyvalent International opened in September 1984 and serves the community of Colomiers, a town of 40,207 inhabitants on the western edge of Toulouse. The school has a total of 1,500 pupils from the ages of fifteen to eighteen.

Among the pupils are English, American and German children whose parents work in the area. Many English-speaking parents are employed by Airbus; others work for local companies. The German pupils attend their own school within the lycée, having all lessons in their mother tongue and eventually taking the Abitur, the German university entrance examination.

The English-speaking pupils are completely integrated into the French educational system and take the French Baccalauréat (see OIB Section). In order that they develop complete fluency in the language, English-speaking pupils have special lessons given by teachers of the Section Internationale of the lycée while their French colleagues have lessons in English as a foreign language.

=== Collége Victor Hugo ===
Housed within the Lycée building, this "Collège d'Enseignement Secondaire" teaches pupils for the first four years of their secondary education. It is a small collège, having only 200 pupils in all. It specialises in English and German teaching. Section Internationale pupils receive six hours of English tuition per week.

For the rest of their programme they are taught by French teachers in classes with their French colleagues. The French, German and British teaching staff work in close co-operation, and trilingual programmes of study for all pupils also form part of the international education offered in this establishment. The programme is especially appropriate for pupils with an international bilingual background in education. At the end of the four-year cycle pupils transfer into the lycée.

=== The Programmes ===
The programme of work is similar to that of schools in England and based upon the English National Curriculum until the end of Key Stage Four. All English-speaking pupils may join the scheme however, regardless of nationality. At the age of fifteen/sixteen, pupils are entered for English GCSE. These qualifications provide proof of the successful candidate's proficiency in English. In the final two years of the lycée, Section Internationale students follow the English and history/Geography programmes of the Option Internationale du Baccalauréat (OIB), which are jointly run by the Section Internationale's sponsors and Education Nationale, the French national education authority.

== Option Internationale Baccalauréat ==
Not to be confused with the Baccalauréat International (based in Switzerland), the OIB (Option Internationale au Baccalauréat) is organised by the French Education Nationale and offers formal recognition at Baccalauréat level of the bilingual competence of the pupils. The OIB examination is administered via a 1901 Association whose members are the various Sections Internationales that offer the OIB as part of their curriculum. This Association is called ASIBA (Association de Sections Internationales Britanniques et Anglophones).

== Conditions of Entry ==
Entry into the "Section Internationale – Britannique" at Collège and Lycée Victor Hugo rests with the school authorities. However, pupils who are selected by the school to follow the International (British) programme must belong to English 31. English 31's participation in the selection process is limited to an assessment of a pupil's ability to follow the programme.

The test takes place in the Lycée/Collège Victor Hugo during May. The test is a two-hour test comprising a piece of extended writing (i.e. an essay) and a comprehension test.

Candidates do not have to be British or native English speakers but they have to have a level of spoken and written English which will allow them to benefit from the English programme delivered by the Section. Pupils whose mother tongue is not English are tested following application to the section. If they are considered to have the level required they will be admitted to the section subject to the availability of places within the appropriate English class and to the availability of places within the appropriate French class for those candidates applying for a full-time place at Lucie Aubrac or Victor Hugo.

Pupils are expected to make progress in English during the year. Assessment of progress is based upon results of standardised tests taken in March/April and upon the reports of the class teachers. If a pupil has not made satisfactory progress, parents will be requested to withdraw their child from the programme at the end of the school year. Weekly homework is set for the pupils and this is a compulsory part of the programme. Pupils who frequently fail to produce homework will be considered as not making satisfactory progress.
