= Section Internationale Anglophone de Buc =

Coordinates: 48.77166°N 2.1208°E

The Section Internationale Anglophone de Buc (SIAB) is a bilingual school in the town of Buc, department of Yvelines, France. It offers English and French education for students from about the age of 7 to 18.

Established in 1998 as a joint project between the Lycée Franco-Allemand (LFA) and the Collège Martin Luther King (MLK) and granted official status as an International Section in 2006, the Section Internationale Anglophone de Buc is based on a wooded campus south-west of Paris and close to Versailles.

Today, the program has expanded to 150 students. English classes span over the primary section from CE2 to CM2, the middle school (Fr. “collège”) with classes from 6ème to 3ème, and the high school (Fr. “lycée”) covering 2nde up to Terminale.

The section forms part of the French state school system, and is free of charge.

== Overview ==
The program is aimed at English-French bilingual children from around the world. It includes families from Anglophone countries, expatriated in France, French families returning from expatriation in Anglophone countries as well as bi-national and bilingual families living in the area.

The selection process for entrance is based on an oral and written exam at primary, middle school and high school level. Acceptance is based on language skills and potential to succeed.

Courses are taught by teachers who are French or English native speakers, depending on the subject taught.

The school offers an English Program Parent-Teachers Association (PSAB), which encourages parents to participate in many of the decisions necessary to manage a school, and help facilitate the integration of the new bilingual families in the area.

== Programs ==
=== 6ème to 3ème ===
The middle school program was established in 1998. Located in the Collège Martin Luther King, the program opened with seven students and has grown to include more than 80 participants from around the world in 2009.

=== 2nd to Terminale ===
The Section Internationale Anglophone was extended to the high school level in 2005, providing classes from 2nde through to Terminale (years 11 – upper 6th UK / grades 10 – 12 US). The section is located in the Lycée Franco-Allemand in Buc. The lycée has a French, German and English program.

=== Primary section ===
Opened in September 2008, this program is offered at the Louis Blériot Primary School in Buc, located next to the MLK middle school and LFA high school campus. The primary section aims to offer English-French bilingual education from an early age in CM1 and CM2 (years 5 and 6 UK/grades 4 and 5 USA) and to prepare students for entry into the Collège Martin Luther King.

There is an entrance test of students’ abilities in English, primarily based on oral expression and listening comprehension.

== See also ==
- List of international schools
- DFG / LFA Buc
