= Deutsche Schule Toulouse =

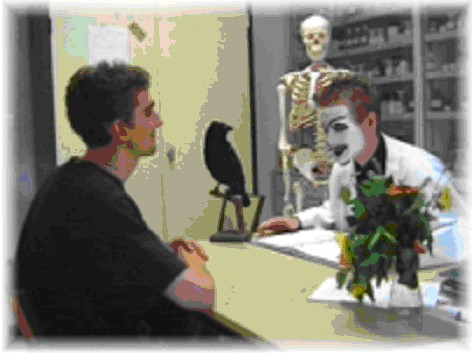
- "Faust at the psychologist" Play written and performed by students of the German School of Toulouse/France and the Lycée International Victor Hugo de Colomiers/France (in: "trait d'union" n° 03/2003)

Location
- Colomiers; France
- Coordinates: 43.61609°N 1.30431°E

Information
- Type: German international school
- Grades: 1-12

Deutsche Schule Toulouse is a German international school located in Colomiers, France, near Toulouse, serving students from years 1–12. The school has two campuses, with the administration, kindergarten, and primary school situated at Eurocampus 2,

The campus is shared with the International School of Toulouse. Secondary classes for years 6-12, including collège (junior high school) and lycée (senior high school/sixth form), are held at the Lycée International Victor-Hugo.
