= Lycée Franco-Allemand de Buc =

DFG / LFA Buc
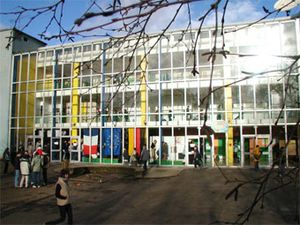
- DFG / LFA Buc

Location
- Buc, Yvelines; France
- Coordinates: 48.7705°N 2.1219°E

Information
- Type: French-German School (DFG/LFA)
- Established: 1975; 51 years ago

DFG / LFA Buc (German: Deutsch-Französisches Gymnasium in Buc, French: Lycée Franco-Allemand de Buc) is a German-French international lycée/gymnasium located in Buc, Yvelines, France, in the Paris metropolitan area.

It is one of the DFG / LFA schools established as a result of the 1963 Élysée Treaty between France and West Germany; the school opened in 1975.

The school offers both the French-German Baccalaureate and the French International Baccalaureate (BFI) in its Section Internationale Anglophone de Buc.

The LFA Buc is a UNESCO Associated School.

== Notable alums ==
- Fleur Pellerin, former culture minister of France

== See also ==
- List including the French international schools in Germany
- Section Internationale Anglophone de Buc
