= Lycée Jules Verne =

Lycée Jules Verne (LJV) or Lycée français Jules-Verne may refer to:

Schools in France:

- Lycée Jules-Verne in Nantes
- Lycée Jules-Verne (Sartrouville)
- Lycée Jules-Verne - Cergy-le-Haut

Schools outside of France:

- Lycée Jules Verne (South Africa) in Johannesburg, South Africa
- Lycée français Jules Verne (Guatemala) near Guatemala City
- Lycée Français de Tenerife "Jules Verne"
- École secondaire Jules-Verne in Vancouver, British Columbia, Canada
