= French Guatemalan =

(France) French Guatemalan (Guatemala) Français-guatémaltèque Francés-Guatemalteco
Regions with significant populations
- Guatemala City, Antigua Guatemala and Quetzaltenango

Languages
- Spanish and French

Religion
- Roman Catholicism

Related ethnic groups
- French people, other Guatemalans

A French Guatemalan is a citizen of Guatemala with French ancestry. Guatemalans of French ancestry make up the third largest group of European ancestry in Guatemala, after German Guatemalans and Spanish Guatemalans. According to the French embassy, as of 2025, there are 960 French citizens in Guatemala.

== History ==
The history of the French in Guatemala is divided into three periods of migratory waves.

=== The late eighteenth century ===
After the French Revolution, capitalists and entrepreneurs came to create coffee plantations in several countries of the Americas; in Guatemala, the first of these were situated in the department of San Marcos in the southern highlands.

The French Revolution introduced new political concepts and aims which formed the basis for the platforms of the liberal, radical and democratic parties of most of the world and therefore of Guatemala. These ideas had great influence on revolutionary movements on Hispanic America.

=== Independence era ===
French veterans of the Napoleonic Wars and the Spanish American wars of independence (such as Nicolas Raoul, Isidoro Saget, and Henri Terralonge) offered their services during the independence wars. Initial diplomatic contact between France and Central America began in 1827; full diplomatic relations were established in 1830. This led to the arrival of French merchants, professionals, and tradesmens. Many of them married local women, which led to an increase in the number of Guatemalan people of French descent. Later some French politicians moved to Guatemala City during the wars between liberals and conservatives. When the Federal Republic of Central America was divided, some French migrated to Costa Rica and Nicaragua, although the majority remained in Guatemala.

=== Twentieth century ===
It is estimated that by 1900 there were approximately 8.000 French immigrants in Mesoamerica, three fourths of them in Mexico and nearly a fifth in Guatemala. The presidency of General José María Reina Barrios, who was educated in Paris, began a revival of diplomatic relations between France and Central America. In 1920, after the triumph of the Unionist movement, several Guatemalan families of French origin came together to found a branch the Alliance Francaise in Guatemala City.

== Demography ==
Many Guatemalans of French descent still preserve the French language and customs and traditions of France. A large majority belong to the Catholic religion, though there are Protestant, Jewish and Muslim minorities. Over 800 French people are estimated to live in Guatemala, making it the third largest French community in Central America, behind Panama and Costa Rica.

=== Notable French Guatemalans ===
- Alberto Fuentes Mohr (1927–1979) economist and politician, served as finance and foreign minister during the 1960s and was assassinated on 25 January 1979 for his social democratic ideas during the right-wing military repression of the General Romeo Lucas regime. His grandfather was Guillaume Mohr Laurent, French migrant and one of the pioneers in the cultivation of coffee on the Pacific Coast of Guatemala.
- Edmond Mulet, Guatemalan diplomat. Last Chief of Staff to former United Nations Secretary-General Ban Ki-moon.
- Enrique Gómez Carrillo, writer, descendant of French great-grandfather
- Consuelo de Sánchez Latour (1924–2015), writer, chronicler, and journalist.
- Oscar Isaac Hernández Estrada, singer, actor, Golden Globe Award nominee, descendant of French great-grandmother
- Harold Caballeros, evangelical pastor whose mother has French ancestry
- Francisca Aparicio de Roda, wife of Justo Rufino Barrios, of Spanish, French and Swiss origin.
- Walter Claverí, footballer and football coach, descendant of French grandfather.

== Guatemala–France relations ==
=== The language and arts ===
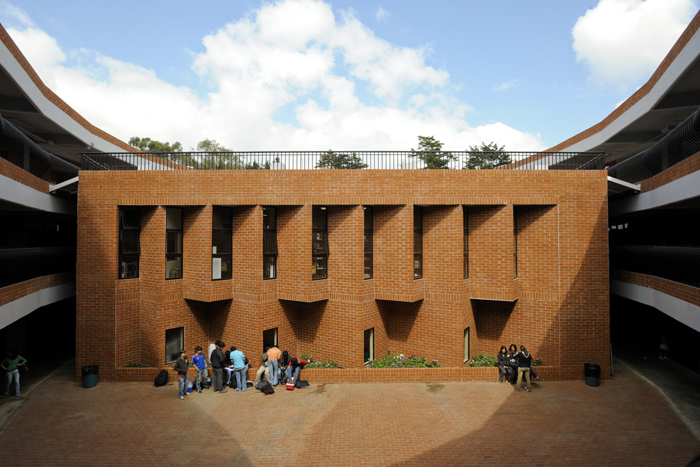
School Jules Verne in Fraijanes, department of Guatemala.

The Alliance Française and the Lycée Français Jules Verne are dedicated to the promotion of French culture and Francophonie in Guatemala in its various expressions: performing arts (music, theater, dance), visual arts (exhibitions, performances, film), lectures, discussions (literature, debates) and training (workshops, residences).

=== The French Embassy in Guatemala ===
The French Embassy in Guatemala is responsible for maintaining both cultural and diplomatic relations between France and Guatemala. It provides grants and scholarships for study in France. The current French ambassador to Guatemala is Philippe Franc.

=== French and Franco-Guatemalan associations ===
There are several associations:

- Sección local de la Union de Franceses del Extranjero (UFE)
- Sociedad Francesa de Beneficencia (SFB)
- Guatem'accueil
- Asociación de ex-estudiantes en Francia (AEF)
- Establecimiento escolar francés Lycée Jules Verne
- Alianza francesa de Guatemala
- Alianza francesa de la Antigua
- Alianza francesa de Quetzaltenango
- Antena del Centro francés de Estudios Mexicanos y Centroamericanos (CEMCA)

== Education ==
Lycée Français Jules Verne, a French international school, is located in Fraijanes, Guatemala.

== See also ==
- French diaspora
- Ethnic groups in Guatemala
