= Cash Luna =

Guatemalan televangelist and faith healer

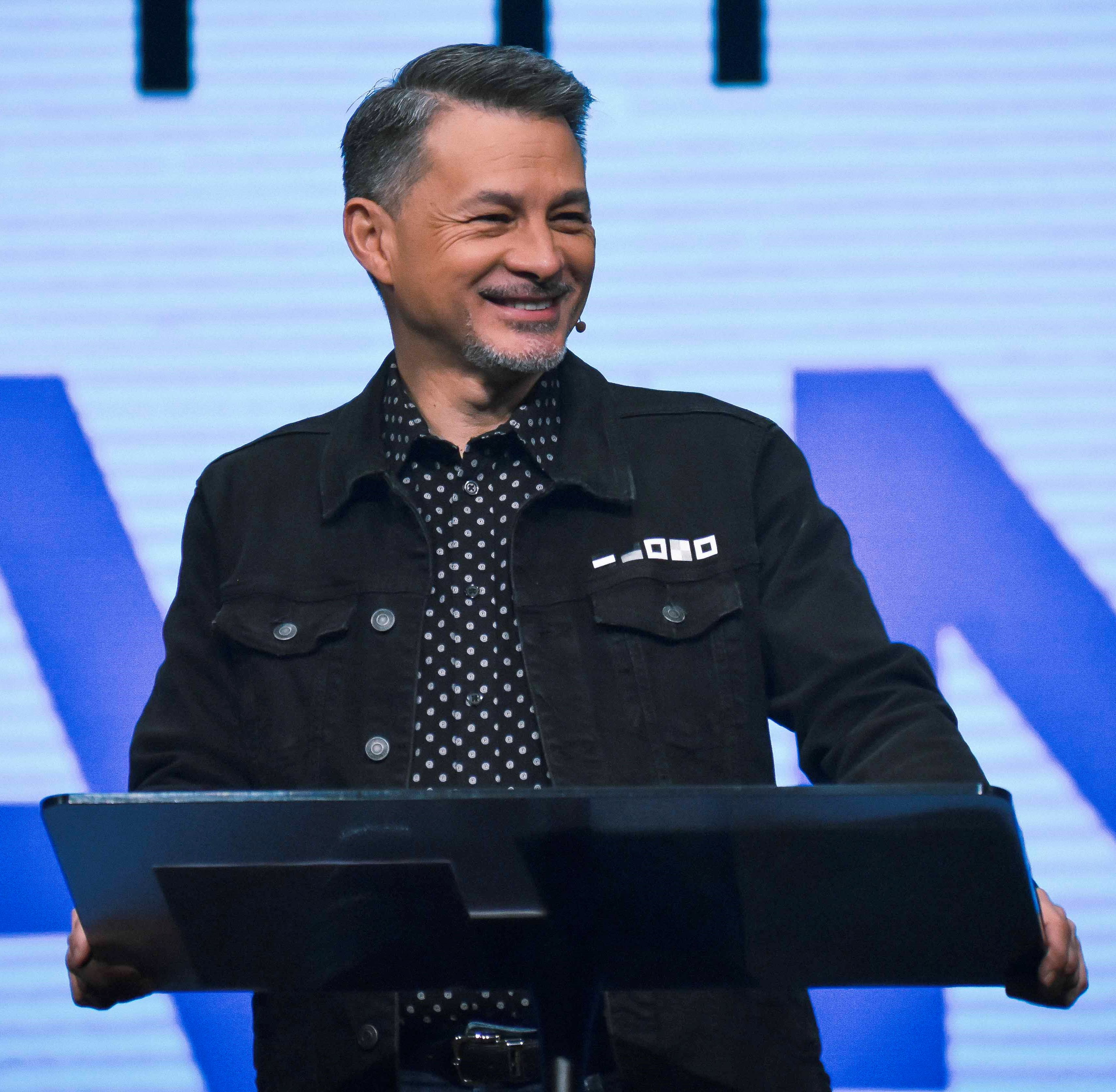
- Luna preaching
- Born: Carlos Enrique Luna Lam; February 4, 1962 (age 64); Guatemala City, Guatemala
- Education: Universidad Francisco Marroquin
- Occupations: Televangelist, pastor and faith healer
- Spouse: Sonia de Luna
- Children: Carlos Enrique Luna, Juan Diego Luna, Ana Gabriela Luna
- Religion: Charismatic Evangelical Christian
- Website: cashluna.org

Carlos Enrique Luna Arango, popularly known as Cash Luna (born 4 March 1962), is a Guatemalan televangelist and faith healer who is the founder and pastor of the Casa de Dios, one of the largest megachurches in Latin America.

== Early life ==
Cash Luna was born into a Catholic household. His parents divorced when he was young and he grew up with his mother. At age 20, Luna became a born-again Christian. He studied at the Universidad Francisco Marroquín, where he graduated with cum laude honors and holds a bachelor's degree in Information Systems Management.

== Casa de Dios ==
Luna and his wife, Sonia de Luna, founded the Casa de Dios church in Guatemala City in 1994. The church is today one of the largest growing congregations in Guatemala, with a claimed 25,000 in weekly attendance. In April 2013, a massive new church complex was unveiled with an area of 270,000 square meters and the capacity to fit 12,000 worshipers at a time.

== Influence and legacy ==
Luna is well known for his televangelism and presence on social media. His Facebook account had a million and a half fans as of 2015. In addition to his large congregation in Guatemala, Luna has a significant number of followers and fans in Mexico as well among Hispanic Americans in the United States. Luna is well known for his creative methods of preaching, one time riding into church on a motorcycle. He is also considered one of the more influential preachers of the prosperity gospel in Latin America.

In 2013, Luna was presented with an award by the then-Guatemalan President Otto Pérez Molina (PP). Pérez stated that Luna had provided an example of what Guatemalans could achieve through faith and working together. He also applauded Luna's efforts to end violence and drug abuse. During the 2015 Guatemalan general election, Luna was a strong supporter of candidate Jimmy Morales (FCN), who later won the election. Morales, who is a devout evangelical Christian, had strong support from Luna and other evangelical pastors. During his presidency, Morales visited the Casa de Dios on multiple occasions.

== False reports of death ==
In August 2017, rumors started spreading on social media that Luna had died after a prolonged absence. He later rebuked these rumors on his Instagram page, stating that he was "alive and kicking".

== Criticism ==
Luna has been criticized for his faith healing activities and amassed wealth. In June 2014, Luna staged a faith healing event in Villahermosa, Mexico where he claimed that the blind would see, the deaf would hear, and the disabled would walk out of their wheelchairs. Despite initially promoting the event as being free, attendees were charged 500 pesos to the event. Luna ended up making a profit of 15 million pesos from the event (roughly about 1 million USD at the time).

The same event was also highly controversial because of the death of Nancy Hernández Álvarez. Nancy's parents, inhabitants of Chiapas, had brought their disabled daughter to the service in hope that she would be healed. During the service, Nancy was brought up to Luna who proclaimed her healed of her ailments while the crowd applauded what they perceived as a miracle. Shortly afterwards, however, Nancy suffered from a heart attack and died the following day. Luna refused to admit that his healing had not worked, saying that God had created Nancy and it was God who called her back.

In December 2018, Guatemalan authorities ordered an investigation into Luna over alleged links with Marllory Chacon, a convicted drug trafficker. According to accusations listed in a report by Univision, Chacon, who was sentenced to twelve years in prison in 2015 in the U.S., was given money by Luna, who allegedly knew about her drug-related activity. On 5 June 2019, Luna's attorney Charles Harder announced that his client was filling a lawsuit against Univision for what they alleged were false allegations.
