= Consuelo Castillo de Sánchez Latour =

Consuelo Castillo de Sánchez Latour (February 7, 1924 in Chiquimula – July 11, 2015 in Guatemala City) was a French-Guatemalan writer, chronicler and journalist. She spoke fluent Spanish, English, French and Esperanto.

In December 1958, Castillo was listed as a candidate to "Woman of the Year" in the competition promoted by Prensa Libre. She was vice-president of the "Asociación de Mujeres Periodistas y Escritoras de Guatemala" (Ampeg) for more than 30 years. Consuelo Sanchez also promoted the Esperanto language in Guatemala along with other intellectuals and teachers. She was president of the "Asociación Esperantista de Guatemala" as well as the "Unión de Mujeres Americanas" from 1959 to 1963.

It is believed that Castillo was a distant family member of Enrique Gómez Carrillo. She is considered a notable French Guatemalan.
