= Casa de Dios =

Christian church located in Guatemala, Central America

Casa de Dios is a Christian church located in Fraijanes, Guatemala.

== Pastors ==
Casa de Dios is a church in Guatemala. The church is led by Pastors Carlos "Cash" Luna and Sonia Luna. As of 2011 Casa de Dios was attended by over 25,000 people. The church services are aired on Enlace TBN's programs "Casa de Dios" and "Noches de Gloria". Casa de Dios is also host to the leadership conference "Ensancha" and to the youth conference "Hechos 29".

== History ==
Casa de Dios was founded on September 11, 1994 by Pastor Carlos "Cash" Luna and his wife Sonia Luna. The Church grew very quickly with a Bible based doctrine of values and principles. Its main focus is on the transformational experience of the Holy Spirit. The teaching focuses on God's promises, Faith, Hope, Integrity, Honor and family values. The church moved from a family living room to a hotel ballroom, and then to the main auditorium of the Chamber of Industry of Guatemala. Finally, in 1995 the church moved to a building known as "La Bodeguita" in Boulevard Los Proceres in Guatemala City, where every night parishioners and viewers experienced the revival that became one of the main characteristics of the church. "La bodeguita" had 550 seats, but only 3 parking lots.

In July 1999, construction began on a new sanctuary with capacity for 3,500 people. By November 2008, 20,000 people were attending one of five Sunday services. Construction of a new sanctuary called "Ciudad de Dios", with capacity for 11,000 people, began in January 2008.

On April 27. 2013 the new "Casa de Dios" temple was finished, becoming one of the biggest temples in the World, and second biggest temple in Guatemala with an extension area of 270,000 square meters. The inauguration was transmitted via Internet to millions of viewers around Latin America and to more than a million people in Guatemala via TV, becoming the most seen church inauguration event in Guatemala.
