= Lycée Français de Tenerife =

Lycée Français International de Tenerife Jules Verne
- Liceo Francés Internacional de Tenerife Jules Verne

Location
- Street Pedro Súarez Hernández, numero 5, 38009, Santa Cruz de Tenerife; Santa Cruz de Tenerife; Spain
- Coordinates: 28.4597201°N 16.278637600000025°W

Information
- Type: K-12 school
- Grades: K-12
- Enrollment: 600 approx
- Website: liceofrancestenerife.es

Lycée Français International de Tenerife "Jules Verne" (Spanish: Liceo Francés de Tenerife) is a French international school in Santa Cruz de Tenerife, Spain. A part of the Mission Laïque Française (MLF) network, it serves maternelle (preschool) through lycée (senior high/sixth form). It offers the bachibac (Spanish bachillerato and French baccalaureat).

== History ==
The Lycée Français International de Tenerife is part of the Mission Laïque Française (Mlf) network, an association recognized as a public utility since 1907. Along with the Agency for French Education Abroad (AEFE), it is one of the two main operators of French education abroad.

== Education & Oficial Exams ==
The Lycée Français International de Tenerife offers a comprehensive trilingual education in French, Spanish, and English, covering students from ages 3 to 18, from preschool to high school. The curriculum follows the Spanish and French educational system while incorporating elements of international education to provide a well-rounded academic experience.

Students have the opportunity to obtain the Bachibac, a dual diploma that grants access to both Spanish and French universities. Additionally, the school prepares students for internationally recognized official language exams, including:

• Cambridge English Qualifications for English proficiency.

• DELF/DALF for French language certification.

• DNB (Diplôme National du Brevet) for middle school students.

To support student learning and communication, the school integrates digital platforms such as Pronote, facilitating coursework management, assignment tracking, and academic progress monitoring in a seamless digital environment.

== Facilities ==
The school has modern facilities, including 2 computer rooms, 2 laboratories, a library, sports areas, and spaces dedicated to extracurricular activities. Additionally, it has been a pioneer in implementing the "Ecocomedor" program promoted by the Government of the Canary Islands, being the first private school to commit to this initiative.

== Achievements and Recognitions ==
The Lycée Français International de Tenerife has been recognized for its commitment to child protection, placing this priority at the core of its actions. Additionally, the school actively participates in tournaments such as the Ligue EURIBE of AEFE and in regional competitions like CINEDFEST. The entire school staff, including teachers, caregivers, and cafeteria personnel, has participated in training sessions to ensure a safe environment for students.

== Notable alumni ==
Over the years, the school has educated numerous students who have excelled in various professional fields at both national and international levels. One of the notable alumni is Nico Paz, a professional footballer who has played for Real Madrid.

== Social Media ==
Instagram

Facebook
