= Lycée Français Jules Verne (Guatemala) =

- Colegio Julio Verne

Location
- KM 10 1/2 carretera a Santa Tecla; Fraijanes; Guatemala
- Coordinates: 14.5358157°N 90.44020410000002°W

Information
- Type: K-12 school
- Established: October 1966
- Grades: K-12
- Website: julesverne.edu.gt

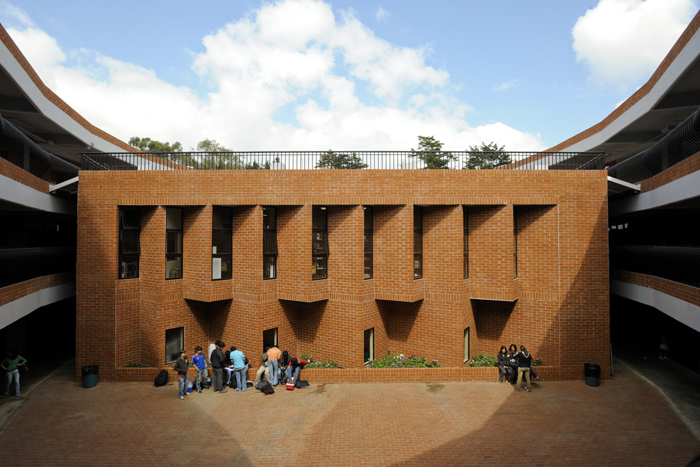
School library

The Lycée français Jules Verne (Spanish: Colegio Julio Verne is a French international school in Fraijanes, Guatemala. It serves levels maternelle (preschool) to lycée (senior high school).

== See also ==
- French Guatemalan
- Institut français d'Amérique centrale
