= Fraijanes =

- Municipality of Guatemala
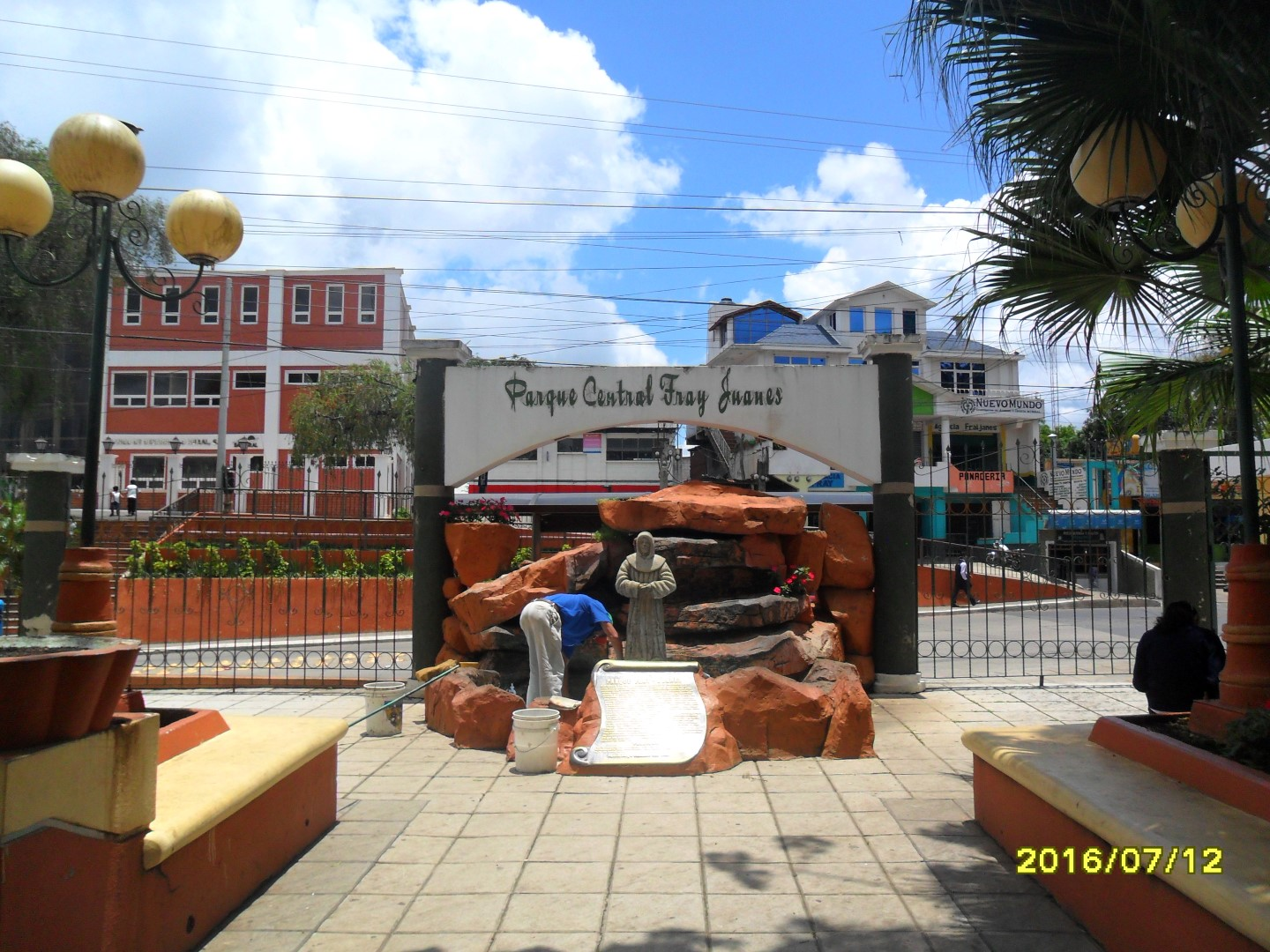
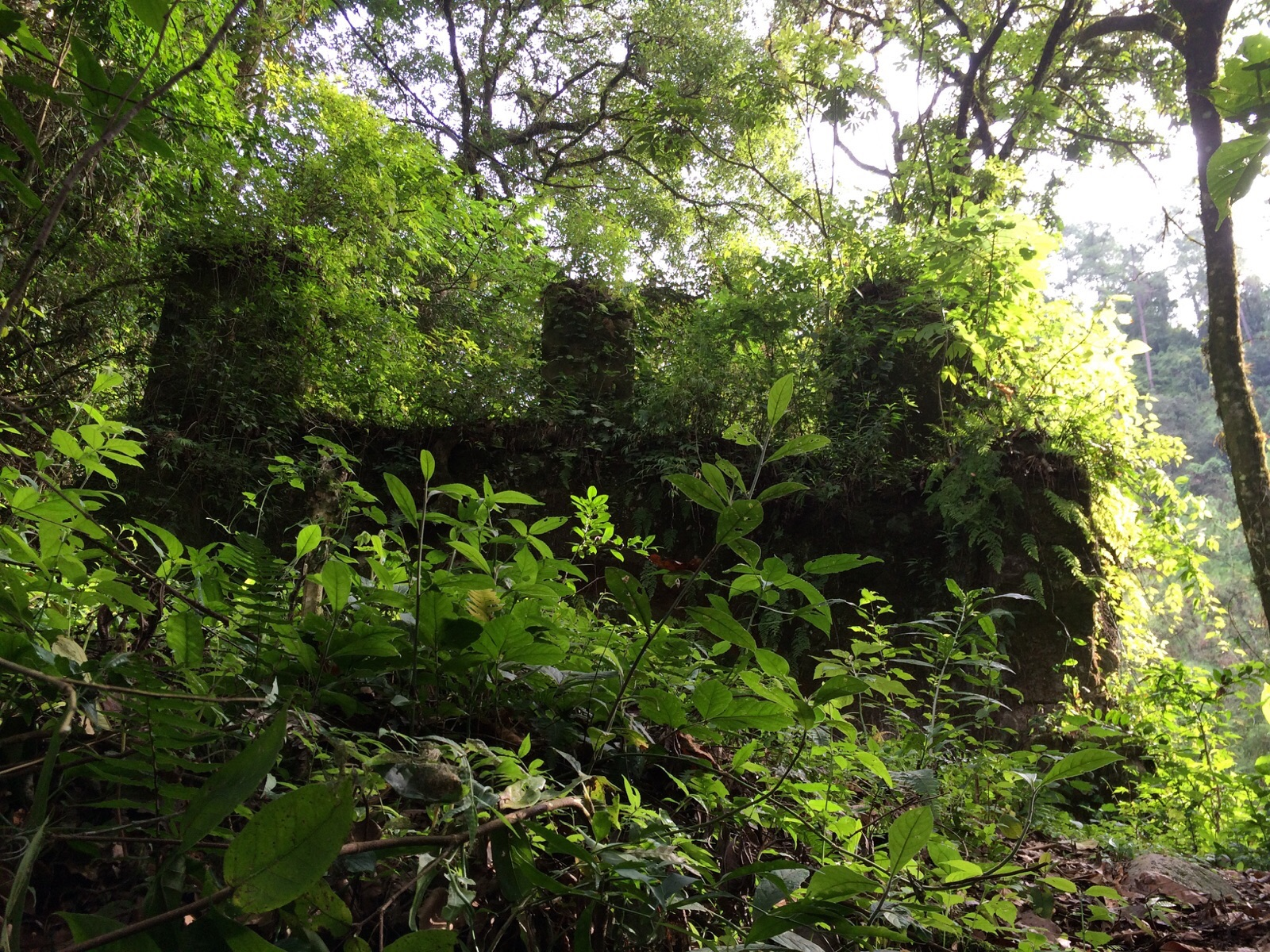
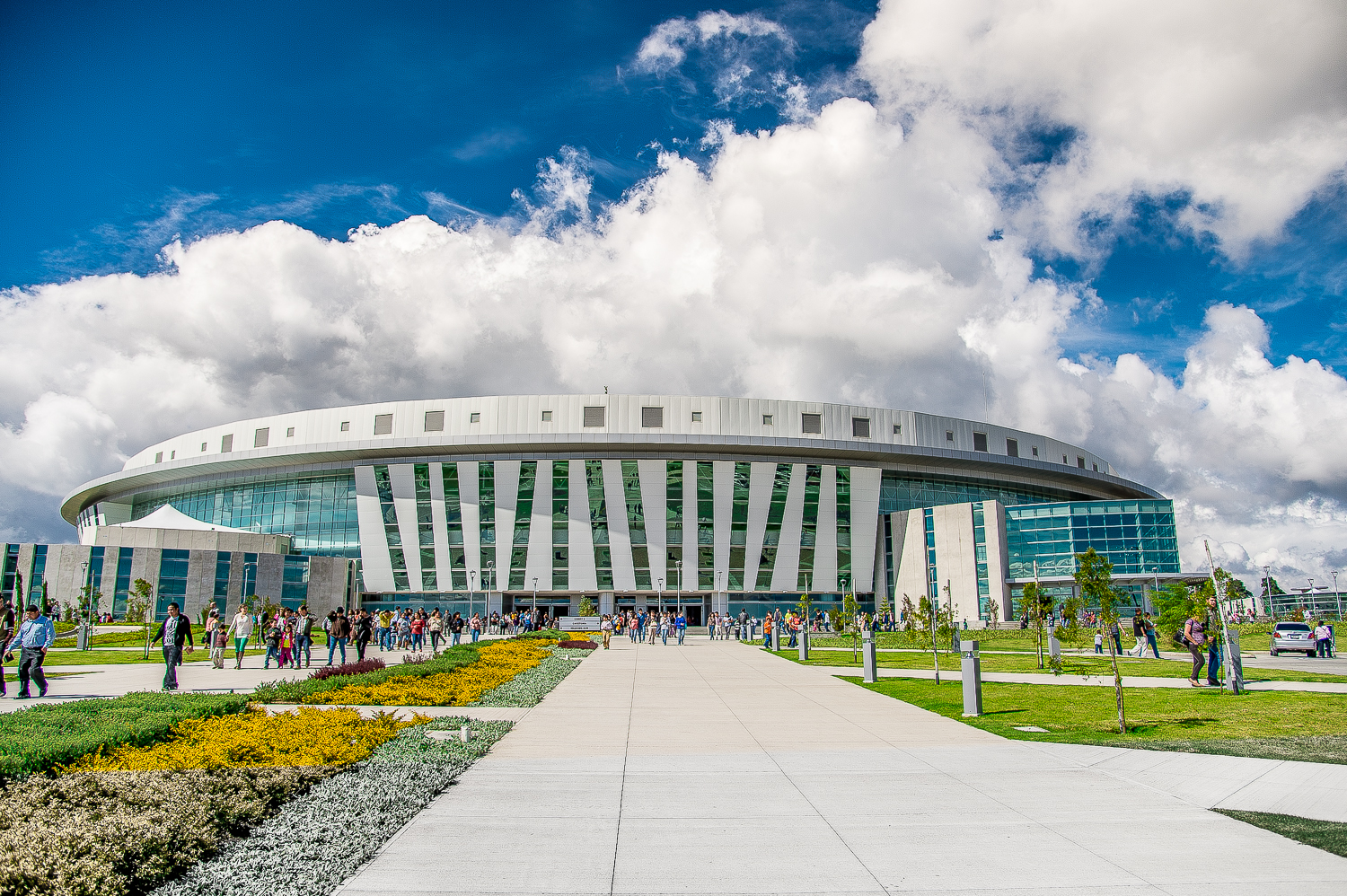
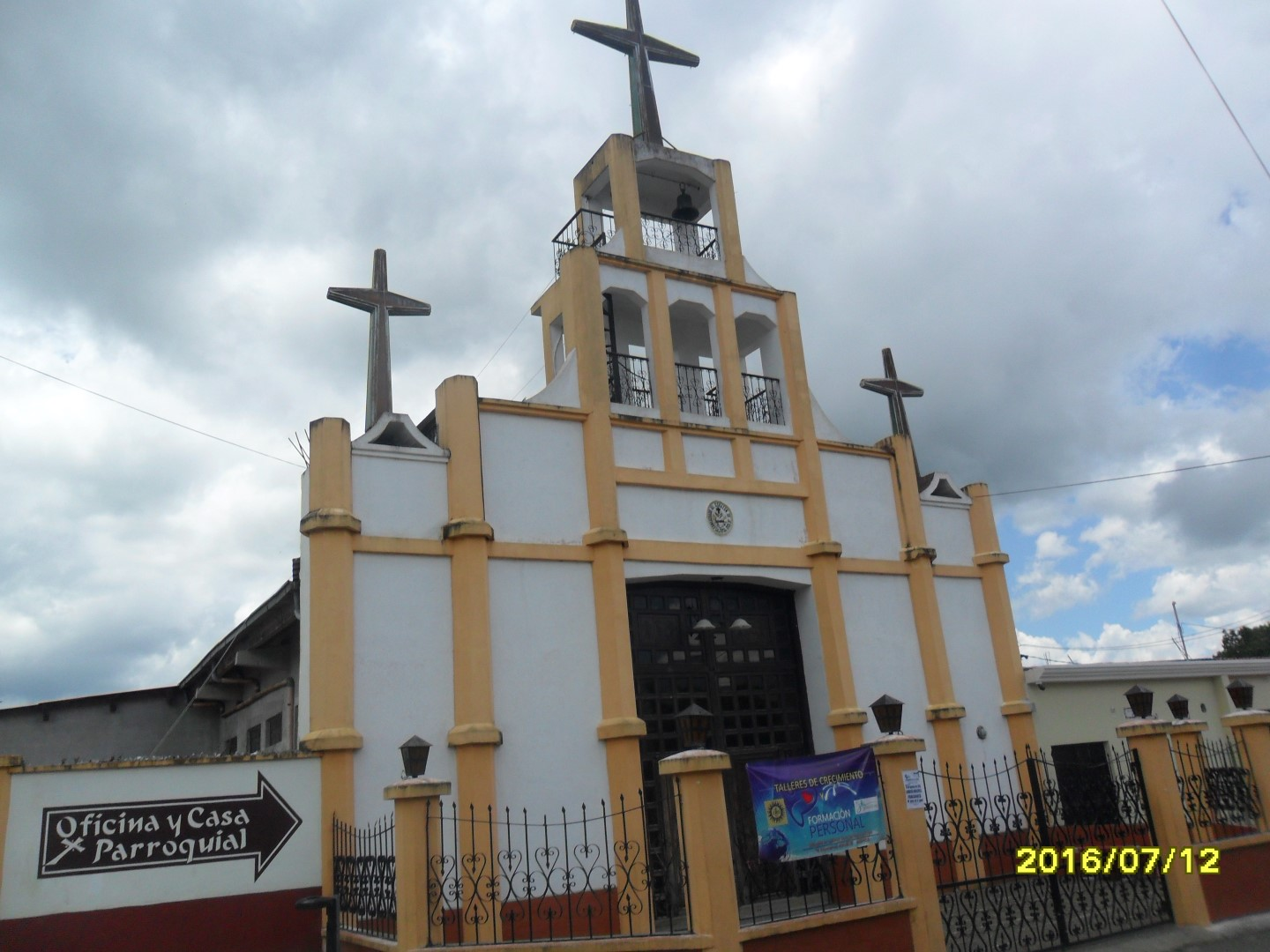
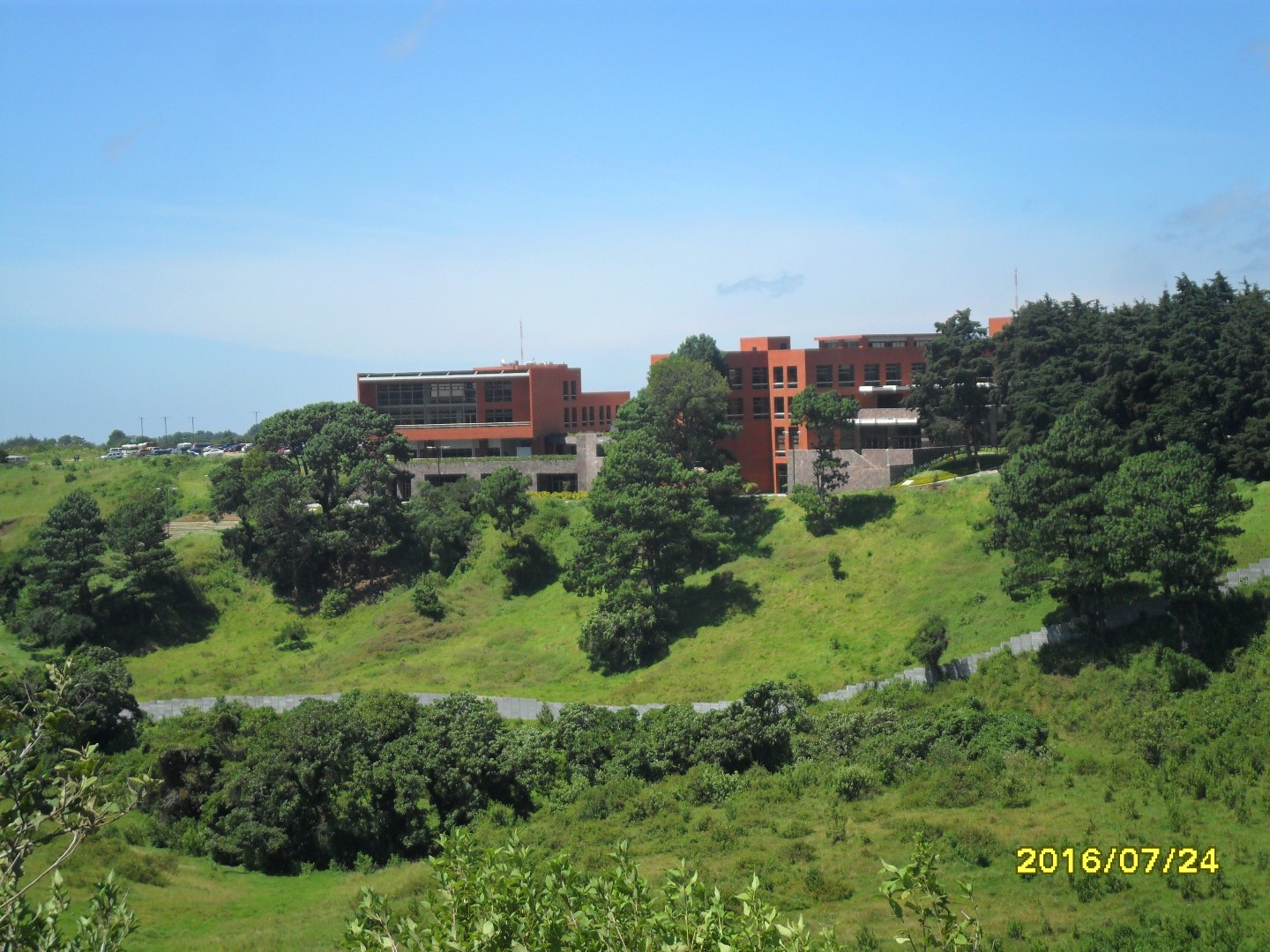
- From top, left to right: Statue in the central park of Fraijanes • Jesuit Monastery of Fraijanes • The House of God temple in Fraijanes • Main church • The University of the Isthmus of Fraijanes

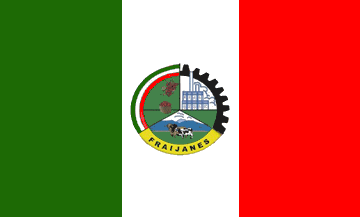
- Flag

- Location in Guatemala
- Coordinates: 14°28′N 90°26′W
- Country: Guatemala
- Department: Guatemala Department

Area
  - Total: 36.9 sq mi (95.5 km^{2})
- Elevation: 5,200 ft (1,585 m)

Population (2018 census)
  - Total: 58,922
  - Density: 1,600/sq mi (617/km^{2})
- Climate: Cwb

Fraijanes is a town, with a population of 60,288 (2018 census), and a municipality in the Guatemala department of Guatemala.

It is known for its fine tasting coffee, which is slightly more acidic than that of Antigua Guatemala.

== History ==
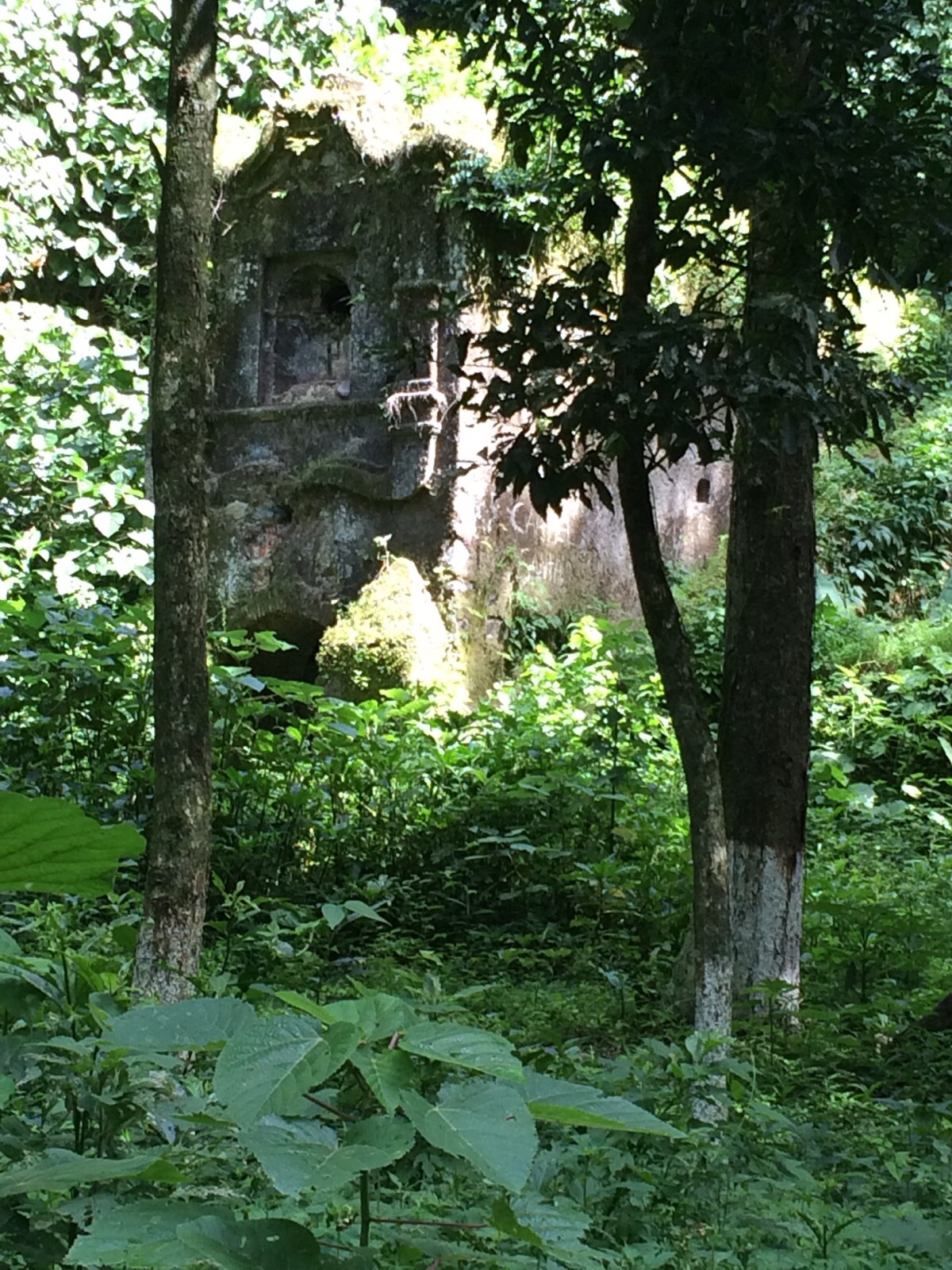
Ruins of a colonial Jesuit hacienda.

Archbishop Pedro Cortés y Larraz wrote in his book Descripción Geográfico-Moral De La Diócesis de Guatemala (Moral and geographic description of Guatemala Diocesis) that, after the Jesuits were expelled from the Spanish colonies in 1767, they left behind a rich hacienda in the area where the modern Fraijanes municipality stands. It was given to two secular priests called Juan Milán and Juan Álvarez. These priests earned the respect and love of the people from the area and, in 1860, the region was renamed "Frailes Juanes" in their honor. Eventually, the name changed into "Fray Juanes" and finally into "Fraijanes".

=== Jesuit hacienda ===
In 1646, Fraijanes had been given to the Society of Jesus to establish a doctrine; there is no religious evidence left in the ruins, making it difficult to assign them to a regular order in particular. The work from Cortés y Larraz shows that the area belonged to Jesuits. Another version suggests that the ruins are from a rich Spanish hacienda and base the assumption on the presence of a tunnel that connects the main residence to a small church.

There are several legends about the ruins. The main one is called «La Cueva del Negro» ("The Black Man Cave") which tells the story of a black slave who escaped and sought refuge in the abandoned hacienda. At first, he survived by harvesting corn and hunting small animals. Eventually, loneliness drove him mad and turned into a terrible cannibal who tormented the nearby settlements until a peasant killed him.

== Demographics ==
The majority of inhabitants are Ladino with an indigenous minority. In addition, an estimated 4% are members of different ethnicities.

The population, according to the 2018 census, was 60,288 inhabitants, consisting of 52% men and 48% women. 25% lived in the rural portion and 75% in the urban portion.

This municipality's population is young, with 35% of the population being between 0 and 19 and 49% being between 20 and 49.

The largest population centers are, in order:

1. The municipal seat of Fraijanes
2. Aldea El Cerrito
3. Aldea Puerta del Señor
4. Caserío Concepción Rabanales

== Geography ==
=== Climate ===
Fraijanes has a subtropical highland climate (Köppen: Cwb).

Climate data for Fraijanes
Month	Jan	Feb	Mar	Apr	May	Jun	Jul	Aug	Sep	Oct	Nov	Dec	Year
Mean daily maximum °C (°F)	23.2 (73.8)	24.2 (75.6)	25.8 (78.4)	26.3 (79.3)	25.7 (78.3)	24.1 (75.4)	24.2 (75.6)	24.5 (76.1)	23.8 (74.8)	23.4 (74.1)	23.0 (73.4)	22.9 (73.2)	24.3 (75.7)
Daily mean °C (°F)	17.7 (63.9)	18.3 (64.9)	19.5 (67.1)	20.3 (68.5)	20.3 (68.5)	19.7 (67.5)	19.6 (67.3)	19.7 (67.5)	19.4 (66.9)	19.1 (66.4)	18.2 (64.8)	17.7 (63.9)	19.1 (66.4)
Mean daily minimum °C (°F)	12.2 (54.0)	12.5 (54.5)	13.2 (55.8)	14.3 (57.7)	15.0 (59.0)	15.3 (59.5)	15.1 (59.2)	14.9 (58.8)	15.0 (59.0)	14.8 (58.6)	13.5 (56.3)	12.5 (54.5)	14.0 (57.2)
Average precipitation mm (inches)	5 (0.2)	3 (0.1)	10 (0.4)	30 (1.2)	203 (8.0)	321 (12.6)	245 (9.6)	247 (9.7)	316 (12.4)	180 (7.1)	37 (1.5)	13 (0.5)	1,610 (63.3)
Source: Climate-Data.org

== Political Divisions ==
The seat of the municipality in the municipality of Fraijanes is the town of the same name: "Fraijanes". The municipal palace is located on the first avenue 1-15 of the municipal seat. The municipality is organized into the following divisions:

1. Aldea Puerta del Señor
2. Aldea El Cerritoç
3. Aldea Los Verdes
4. Aldea Canchón
5. Aldea Lo de Dieguez
6. Colonia Pavón
7. Caserío Concepción Rabanales
8. Caserío El Chocolate
9. Caserío San Arturo
10. Caserío Las Crucitas
11. Caserío Don Justo
12. Cantón La Ceiba

== Economy ==
In the decades prior to 2010, the economy was based mostly on agriculture, known especially for the cultivation of coffee and beans. A population explosion, driven by migrants from neighboring municipalities, led to the commercialization of its economy.

In the municipality the proportion of people who are in extreme poverty is 1.72%. Overall, 21.04% of the municipality's population are impoverished. According to the human development index, Fraijanes occupies ninth place among the municipalities of the department of Guatemala, as it has an index of 0.727 for 2008.

The percentage of homes that have access to drinking water is 70.60%.

=== Coffee ===
In Fraijanes, the cultivation of coffee has been fundamental not only from an economic point of view, but also from a cultural point of view, since the municipal authorities have promoted the cultivation of the grain as part of the identity of Fraijanes;

In the study of the coffee sector carried out by the Superintendency of Banks of Guatemala, it is established that Fraijanes is one of the five coffee production regions in Guatemala, as established by the Classification carried out by ANACAFE. The varieties grown in Fraijanes are: Arabica, Bourbon, Caturra, Catual and Pache.

== Government ==
=== Local ===
Members of the Municipal Council of Fraijanes
Mayor	Wilton Leonardo Berreondo Figueroa	Syndicate I	Otto Santiago Santos Guas
Syndicate II	Maynor Manolo Peréz Chajón	Supplementary Syndicate	Luis Miguel Briones Hernández
Councilor I	Jonnathan Hernan Sarceño Pivaral	Councilor II	Luis Lizandro Chávez
Councilor III	Francisco Santos Morales	Councilor IV	Nicolás Sicán García
Councilor V	Santiago Adelso Villeda Marcos	Supplementary Councilor	Edgar Miguel Castillo Álvarez

=== National ===
Pavón Prison is near Fraijanes.

== Education ==
The Lycée Français Jules Verne, an elite French international school, is in Fraijanes. Education in the municipality is provided by public and private institutions. There are official schools of the Ministry of Education, among which the Mixed Rural School No. 818, located in the village Don Justo, and the Mixed Rural School located in the Canchón village, among others, stand out. The majority of public schools are concentrated in the municipal center.

Institutions called "Cooperative Institutes" also operate in the municipality, which are responsible for providing basic level education, ranging from first to third grade; These school years are completed at the end of the primary level and constitute the prerequisite to access college-level education. Despite this, until the 2010s it was common for the majority of the population of age to attend college in Guatemala City to enroll in private schools and obtain their degree, since until that decade the schools or institutions that provided the service in the municipality were not as robust.

In the municipality there are 11 IGER (Guatemalan Institute of Radial Education) establishments for primary, middle and high school by maturity; 7 pre-primary level schools, 21 primary schools, 6 middle level institutes and one college level institute.

=== Statistics ===
According to what is published in the Municipal Development Plan, school dropout has a percentage of 3.38% for the primary level, 3.73% for the middle level and 2.48% for the high school level. The illiteracy rate in the municipality, for the year 2002, was 17.7%. According to the aforementioned publication, the municipality has a schooling rate of 94.11% for the primary level, 36.32% for the secondary level and 15.3% for the college level.

=== Technical education ===
Various technical courses are taught in the municipality, financed and developed at the local level by the municipal authorities, through the Municipal Women's Office and the Social Affairs Office of the Mayor's Wife (SOSEA), these are aimed mainly at women. young and old. The objective of these trainings is to provide lower class women with knowledge so that they can improve their economic situation.

=== Private education ===
Following the urban and commercial boom caused by the migration of families from other municipalities in the department of Guatemala, the installation of schools that provide private education in the municipality began to increase rapidly. Most of the private schools that operate in the municipality are institutions of very high academic level because, for the most part, the families that immigrated to the municipality at the beginning of the 21st century are middle and upper class. For its part, the original population of the municipality, made up mostly of people with a lower economic level, continued traveling to study in Guatemala City until the mid-2010s, since the costs of the private education institutions that operate in the municipality exceed their payment capacity. Among the private institutions that moved their facilities to the municipality is the Jules Verne School, which is a Franco-Guatemalan institution.

In 2014, the private University of the Istmo of Guatemala (UNIS) began its operations in the municipality. The public university is the University de San Carlos de Guatemala, but it is not based in the municipality and those who study there have to travel to the Central Campus in zone 12 of Guatemala City, or to the Metropolitan University Center, in the zone 11.

Two other universities operate in the Municipality, in the Marco Tulio Meda Mendoza Educational Complex, branches of the Galileo University and Pan American University operate, which teach classes for certain professions for a few days per week, both are private educational institutions.

== See also ==
- Guatemala Department

== Notes and references ==
=== Works cited ===
- Tecún Espinoza, Johny Amílcar (2012). Centro ecoturístico "La Cueva del Negro" (PDF) (Bachelors). Guatemala: Facultad de Arquitectura de la Universidad de San Carlos de Guatemala.
