= List of international schools =

This is a list of notable international schools from around the world.

== Albania ==
- Tirana International School

== Algeria ==
- American International School of Algiers
- Lycée International Alexandre-Dumas d'Alger
- Lycée International Alexandre-Dumas d'Annaba
- Lycée International Alexandre-Dumas d'Oran

== Andorra ==
- Instituto Español de Andorra

== Angola ==
- Luanda International School

== Argentina ==
- Asociación Cultural y Educativa Japonesa
- Asociación Escuelas Lincoln
- Colegio Pestalozzi (Argentina)
- Goethe-Schule Buenos Aires
- Northlands School
- St. Andrew's Scots School

== Armenia ==
- QSI International School of Yerevan
- UWC Dilijan

== Aruba ==
- International School of Aruba

== Australia ==
- Banksia Park International High School
- Deutsche Schule Melbourne
- German International School Sydney
- Glenunga International High School
- International Grammar School
- International School of Western Australia
- Kardinia International College
- Kooralbyn International School
- Lycée Condorcet
- Narrabundah College
- Professor Harry Messel International Science School
- Sydney Japanese International School
- The Japanese School of Melbourne
- The Japanese School in Perth

== Austria ==
- American International School - Salzburg
- American International School Vienna
- Danube International School Vienna
- Graz International Bilingual School
- International Christian School of Vienna
- Japanese International School in Vienna
- Linz International School Auhof
- Lycée Français de Vienne
- St. Gilgen International School
- Vienna International School

== Azerbaijan ==
- Baku International School
- International School of Azerbaijan

== Bahamas ==
- Lucaya International School
- Lyford Cay International School
- Saint Andrew's School

== Bahrain ==
- Abdul Rahman Kanoo International School
- Al Noor International School
- Al Raja School
- Bahrain School
- British School of Bahrain
- Ibn Khuldoon National School
- St. Christopher's School
- The Japanese School in Bahrain

== Bangladesh ==
- Aga Khan School, Dhaka
- American International School of Dhaka
- Bangladesh International School and College
- International School Dhaka
- Park International School and College, Dhaka
- Scholastica (school)
- St Francis Xavier's Green Herald International School

== Belgium ==
- Antwerp International School
- Bogaerts International School
- British School of Brussels
- Brussels American School
- European School of Brussels I
- European School of Brussels II
- European School, Brussels III
- European School, Brussels IV
- European School, Mol
- International School Ghent
- International School of Brussels
- International German School of Brussels
- St. John's International School
- SHAPE High School
- World International School
- Scandinavian School of Brussels

== Benin ==
- English International School
- Établissement Français d'Enseignement Montaigne
- QSI International School of Benin

== Bolivia ==
- American Cooperative School La Paz
- Cochabamba Cooperative School
- Deutsche Schule La Paz

== Bosnia and Herzegovina ==
- Sarajevo International School
- UWC Mostar

== Brazil ==
- American School of Brasília
- American School of Recife
- American School of Rio de Janeiro
- Associação Escola Graduada de São Paulo, American School
- Associação Civil de Divulgação Cultural e Educacional Japonesa do Rio de Janeiro, Japanese School
- Colégio Dante Alighieri
- Colégio Humboldt São Paulo
- Colégio Miguel de Cervantes. Spanish international school
- Colégio Suíço-Brasileiro de Curitiba, Swiss-Brazilian School
- Colégio Visconde de Porto Seguro, German School founded in 1878 (Sao Paulo)
- Deutsche Schule Rio de Janeiro
- Escola Japonesa de São Paulo, Japanese School
- Escola Suíço-Brasileira Rio de Janeiro, Swiss-Brazilian International School
- Istituto Italo-Brasiliano Biculturale Fondazione Torino, Belo Horizonte
- International School of Curitiba
- International School of Macaé
- Japanese School of Manaus
- Lycée Pasteur de São Paulo
- Lycée Molière de Rio de Janeiro
- Lycée Français François Mitterrand, Brasilia
- Pan American Christian Academy
- Pan American School of Bahia
- School of the Nations (Bahá'í)
- Scuola Italiana Eugenio Montale, Italian international school in Sao Paulo
- St Paul's School, Brazil, British international school (Sao Paulo)

== Brunei ==
- International School Brunei
- Jerudong International School
- Seri Mulia Sarjana School

== Bulgaria ==
- American College of Sofia
- Anglo-American School of Sofia
- Lycée Français Victor Hugo
- Zlatarski International School

== Cambodia ==
- International School of Phnom Penh
- International School of Siem Reap
- Northbridge International School Cambodia
- Zaman International School

== Cameroon ==
- American School of Yaounde

== Canada ==
- Alexander von Humboldt German International School Montreal
- Appleby College
- Bishop's College School
- Calgary French And International School
- Collège International Marie de France
- Columbia International College
- German International School Toronto
- Lester B. Pearson United World College of the Pacific
- Maxwell International School
- Northern Alberta Institute of Technology
- Pearson College UWC
- Sedbergh School
- Stanstead College
- Toronto French School
- York School

== Chile ==
- Colegio Suizo de Santiago
- Deutsche Schule Santiago
- Grange School, Santiago
- Instituto Alemán Carlos Anwandter
- International School Nido de Aguilas
- Lycée Antoine-de-Saint-Exupéry de Santiago
- Lycée Français Charles de Gaulle (Chile)
- Santiago College
- Scuola Italiana Arturo Dell'Oro

== Colombia ==
- Anglo Colombian School
- Colegio Bolivar
- Colegio Nueva Granada
- Deutsche Schule Bogotá

== Costa Rica ==
- American International School of Costa Rica
- Colegio Humboldt (The German School of Costa Rica), San José
- Costa Rica Country Day School
- Del Mar Academy, Nosara
- European School of Costa Rica
- UWC Costa Rica

== Croatia ==
- American International School of Zagreb
- British International School of Zagreb
- Deutsche Internationale Schule in Zagreb
- French School in Zagreb

== Cuba ==
- International School of Havana

== Curaçao ==
- International School of Curaçao

== Cyprus ==
- American Academy of Larnaca
- American Academy Nicosia
- American International School in Cyprus
- Falcon School Cyprus
- International School of Paphos
- The English School, Nicosia
- The Heritage Private School

== Czech Republic ==
- Carlsbad International School
- Deutsche Schule Prag
- English College in Prague
- English International School, Prague
- International School of Prague
- Japanese School in Prague
- Lycée français de Prague
- Park Lane International School
- Prague British School
- Townshend International School

== Denmark ==
- Copenhagen International School
- Herlufsholm School
- Rygaards International School
- St. Joseph's School, Roskilde
- German School St. Petri, Copenhagen
- Østerbro International School

== Dominican Republic ==
- Carol Morgan School
- Colegio Dominico-Americano

== Ecuador ==
- Academia Cotopaxi
- Alliance Academy International
- Colegio Americano de Quito
- Colegio Menor San Francisco de Quito
- Inter-American Academy of Guayaquil

== Egypt ==
- American International School in Egypt
- British International College of Cairo
- British International School in Cairo
- Cairo American College
- Cairo Japanese School
- Deutsche Evangelische Oberschule
- Deutsche Schule der Borromäerinnen Alexandria
- Deutsche Schule der Borromäerinnen Kairo
- German School Hurghada
- Green Land Pré Vert International School
- Lycée Français du Caire
- Malvern College Egypt
- New Cairo British International School
- New Generation International School
- Port Said American School
- Port Said International School
- Schutz American School, Alexandria
- St. Joseph Schools, Sharm El Sheikh
- The British School, Alexandria

== Estonia ==
- Tallinn English College
- Tallinn French School

== Eswatini ==
- Sifundzani School
- Waterford Kamhlaba United World College of Southern Africa (UWC)

== Finland ==
- English School, Helsinki
- Deutsche Schule Helsinki
- International School of Helsinki
- Lycée franco-finlandais d'Helsinki
- Oulu International School
- Ressu Comprehensive School
- Turku International School

== France ==
- American School of Paris
- American School of Grenoble
- Bordeaux International School
- British School of Paris
- Chavagnes International College
- Cité Scolaire Internationale de Grenoble
- Cité Scolaire Internationale de Lyon
- Deutsch-Französisches Gymnasium
- Deutsche Schule Toulouse
- Ecole Active Bilingue Jeannine Manuel
- International Bilingual School of Provence
- Internationale Deutsche Schule Paris
- International School of France
- International School of Paris
- International School of Toulouse
- Kingsworth International School
- Lycée International de Saint Germain-en-Laye
- Lycée International Georges Duby
- Marymount School
- Mougins School
- Notre-Dame International High School

== Georgia ==
- International Black Sea University
- International School of Georgia
- QSI International School of Tbilisi

== Germany ==
- Bavarian International School
- Berlin Brandenburg International School
- Berlin British School
- Berlin Cosmopolitan School
- Berlin Metropolitan School
- Bonn International School
- Deutsch-Französisches Gymnasium
- Franconian International School
- Frankfurt International School
- Heidelberg International School
- Independent Bonn International School
- International School Augsburg
- International School of Bremen
- International School of Düsseldorf
- International School of Stuttgart
- John F. Kennedy School, Berlin
- Leipzig International School
- Munich International School
- Nelson Mandela School, Berlin
- Robert Bosch United World College, Freiburg
- St. George's School, Cologne
- UWC Robert Bosch College

== Ghana ==
- Akosombo International School
- Ghana International School
- Lincoln Community School
- Tema International School
- SOS-Hermann Gmeiner International College

== Greece ==
- American Community Schools
- Campion School
- French School of Thessaloniki
- German School of Athens
- German School of Thessaloniki
- International School of Athens
- Lycée Franco-Hellénique Eugène Delacroix
- Philippine School in Greece
- Pinewood - The American International School
- St Lawrence College, Athens

== Guatemala ==
- Colegio Interamericano

== Honduras ==
- Albert Einstein International School of San Pedro Sula
- American School of Tegucigalpa
- Del Campo International School
- Escuela Internacional Sampedrana
- International School, Tegucigalpa
- Mazapan School

== Hungary ==
- American International School of Budapest
- Britannica International School
- Gustave Eiffel French School of Budapest
- International Christian School of Budapest
- The Budapest Japanese School
- Thomas Mann Gymnasium (Deutsche Schule Budapest)

== Iceland ==
- International School of Iceland

== Indonesia ==
=== Jakarta ===
- AIS Indonesia
- British School Jakarta
- Gandhi Memorial International School
- Jakarta Intercultural School
- Jakarta International Korean School
- North Jakarta Intercultural School
- Raffles Christian School
- Sekolah Pelita Harapan

=== Other locations in Indonesia ===
- Bandung Alliance International School
- Charis Global School Lippo Cikarang
- Surabaya International School
- Surabaya European School
- Yogyakarta International School

== Ireland ==
- St. Andrew's College

== Israel ==
- Walworth Barbour American International School in Israel

== Italy ==
- American Overseas School of Rome
- American School of Milan
- Aviano Middle/High School
- Canadian College Italy
- Deutsche Schule Mailand
- Deutsche Schule Genua
- Deutsche Schule Rom
- European School of Varese
- Institut Saint Dominique of Rome
- International French School of Turin
- International School of Brindisi
- International School in Genoa
- International School of Florence
- International School of Milan
- Liceo Español Cervantes de Roma
- Lycée français Chateaubriand de Rome
- Lycée Stendhal de Milan
- Lycée Victor Hugo of Florence
- Marymount International School of Rome
- Naples Middle/High School
- Rome International School
- Scuola Giapponese di Milano
- Scuola Giapponese di Roma
- Scuola Svizzera di Milano
- Scuola Svizzera di Roma
- St. George's British International School
- The British School of Milan
- UWC Adriatic
- Vicenza American High School

== Ivory Coast ==
- International Christian Academy
- Vavoua International School

== Jordan ==
- American Community School in Amman
- Amman Baccalaureate School
- International Community School Amman
- King's Academy
- Lycée Français d'Amman
- Modern American School
- Modern Montessori School
- New English School

== Kazakhstan ==
- Almaty International School
- Haileybury Almaty
- Haileybury Astana
- Kazakhstan International School
- Miras International School, Almaty
- Miras International School, Astana

== Kenya ==
- Braeburn Mombasa International School
- Brookhouse School
- GEMS Cambridge International School
- Greensteds School, Nakuru
- Hillcrest School
- International School of Kenya
- Nairobi Academy
- Oshwal Academy
- Rift Valley Academy
- Rosslyn Academy
- St. Andrews School, Turi

== Korea ==
- Branksome Hall Asia
- Busan Foreign School
- Busan Japanese School
- Chadwick International
- Cheongna Dalton School
- Daegu International School
- Dulwich College Seoul
- French School of Seoul
- German School Seoul International
- Global Christian Foreign School
- Gyeonggi Suwon International School
- International Mongolia School
- International School of Koje
- Japanese School in Seoul
- Korea International School Jeju
- Kwangju Foreign School
- Lycée International Xavier
- Overseas Chinese High School, Busan
- Overseas Chinese High School, Daegu
- Rainbow International School, Seoul
- Russian Embassy School in Seoul
- Seoul Chinese Primary School
- Seoul Foreign School
- Seoul International School
- Seoul Overseas Chinese High School
- Taejon Christian International School
- Yongsan International School of Seoul

== Kuwait ==
- American International School of Kuwait
- Carmel School
- Gulf English School of Kuwait
- Kuwait English School
- New English School

== Kyrgyzstan ==
- European School in Central Asia

== Laos ==
- Vientiane International School

== Latvia ==
- International School of Riga
- International School of Latvia
- Riga French Lycée

== Lebanon ==
- ACS Beirut
- Antonine International School
- Brummana High School
- Collège Protestant Français
- German School Beirut
- Grand Lycée Franco-Libanais
- International College
- Sagesse High School

== Lesotho ==
- National University of Lesotho International School

== Luxembourg ==
- International School of Luxembourg
- Lycée Vauban

== Macau ==
- International School of Macao
- School of the Nations (Bahá'í)

== Malaysia ==
- Lodge School
- Tenby International School, Penang
- The International School of Penang (Uplands)

=== Kuala Lumpur ===
- Nexus International School Malaysia
- elc International school
- Fairview International School
- Garden International School
- Global Indian International School
- International School of Kuala Lumpur
- The International School at ParkCity
- Mont' Kiara International School

== Malawi ==
- Bishop Mackenzie International School
- Saint Andrews International High School

== Malta ==
- Chiswick House School
- Verdala International School

== Mauritius ==
- Le Bocage International School

== Mexico ==
- American School Foundation of Monterrey, Monterrey
- American School Foundation of Guadalajara, Guadalajara
- ASF Mexico, Mexico City
- Centro Educativo Monteverde, Cancún
- Colegio Alemán Alexander von Humboldt, Mexico City
- Colegio Alemán de Guadalajara
- Colegio Americano de Puebla
- Edron Academy
- Greengates School, Mexico City
- John F. Kennedy School, The American School of Querétaro
- Liceo Mexicano Japones, Japanese school of Mexico
- Lycée Franco-Mexicain, Mexico City
- Peterson Schools, México City
- San Roberto International School, Monterrey
- The Wingate School (Mexico), México City

== Mongolia ==
- American School of Ulaanbaatar
- British School of Ulaanbaatar
- International School of Ulaanbaatar
- Mongol Aspiration School

== Morocco ==
- American School of Marrakesh
- Casablanca American School
- George Washington Academy
- Lycée André Malraux de Rabat
- Lycée français international Louis-Massignon
- Rabat American School
- Tangier Anglo-Moroccan School

== Myanmar ==
- International School Yangon
- Myanmar International School
- Network International School

== Namibia ==
- Deutsche Höhere Privatschule Windhoek
- Windhoek International School

== Netherlands ==
- American International School of Rotterdam
- American School of The Hague
- British School in the Netherlands
- British School of Amsterdam
- International School Amsterdam
- International School Groningen
- International School of The Hague
- International School Twente
- International Secondary School Eindhoven
- Rotterdam International Secondary School
- UWC Maastricht

== New Zealand ==
- Auckland International College
- John McGlashan College
- Kristin School

== Nicaragua ==
- Lincoln International Academy
- Nicaragua Christian Academy
- Notre Dame School

== Niger ==
- Lycée La Fontaine
- Sahel Academy

== Nigeria ==
- Charles Dale Memorial International School
- First Island Montessori School
- Hillcrest School
- International School Ibadan
- International School Lagos
- Olashore International School
- The Regent School

== Norway ==
- Birralee International School Trondheim
- British International School of Stavanger
- International School of Bergen
- International School of Stavanger
- Oslo International School
- UWC Red Cross Nordic

== Oman ==
- American British Academy
- British School - Muscat
- Indian School Muscat
- Sultan's School

== Panama ==
- Balboa Academy
- Crossroads Christian Academy
- International School of Panama

== Papua New Guinea ==
- Ukarumpa International School

== Paraguay ==
- American School of Asuncion
- Lycée Français International Marcel Pagnol

== Peru ==
- Markham College
- Colegio Pestalozzi
- Deutsche Schule Lima Alexander von Humboldt
- Newton College
- San Silvestre School
- Lycée Franco-Péruvien
- Colegio Italiano Antonio Raimondi

== Poland ==
- American School of Warsaw
- British International School of Cracow
- British School, Warsaw
- Embassy International School
- International School of Krakow
- Lycée René-Goscinny
- The Japanese School in Warsaw
- Willy-Brandt-Schule

== Portugal ==
- Aljezur International School
- Carlucci American International School of Lisbon
- Colégio Luso-Internacional do Porto
- International School São Lourenço
- Oeiras International School
- Oporto British School
- Saint Dominic's International School
- Saint Julian's School
- Vale Verde International School
- Vilamoura International School

== Qatar ==
- ACS International Schools
- American School of Doha
- Arab International Academy
- Bangladesh M.H.M High School & College, Doha-Qatar
- The Cambridge School Doha
- Compass International School
- Doha British School
- Doha College
- Dukhan English School
- GEMS American Academy Qatar
- German International School Doha
- Japan School of Doha
- Lycée Bonaparte
- Lycée Franco-Qatarien Voltaire
- Newton International School
- Nord Anglia International School Al Khor
- Park House English School
- Philippine School Doha
- Qatar Academy
- Qatar Canadian School
- Qatar International School
- Sherborne Qatar

== Romania ==
- American International School of Bucharest
- British School of Bucharest
- International School of Bucharest

== Russia ==
- Anglo-American School of Moscow
- Anglo-American School of St. Petersburg
- Atlantic International School
- British International School
- Interdom
- International Academy of St. Petersburg, Russia
- Sakhalin International School

== Saudi Arabia ==
- American International School – Riyadh
- American School Dhahran
- Bangladesh International School, Dammam
- Bangladesh International School, English Section, Riyadh
- British International School of Jeddah
- International Indian School, Dammam
- International Indian School Jeddah
- International Indian School, Riyadh

== Senegal ==
- Lycée Jean Mermoz (Senegal)

== Serbia ==
- École Française de Belgrade
- International School of Belgrade

== Seychelles ==
- International School Seychelles

== Slovakia ==
- Deutsche Schule Bratislava
- École française de Bratislava
- The British International School Bratislava

== Slovenia ==
- British International School of Ljubljana
- Danila Kumar International School
- European School Ljubljana
- French School in Ljubljana
- Gimnazija Bezigrad

== South Africa ==
- American International School of Johannesburg
- Lycée Jules Verne (South Africa)
- American International School of Cape Town

== Spain ==
- American School of Barcelona
- American School of Madrid
- Benjamin Franklin International School
- British School of Barcelona
- Colegio Japonés de Madrid
- Chester College International School
- David Glasgow Farragut High School
- Guadalaviar School
- International College Spain
- International School of Barcelona
- Japanese School in Barcelona
- Kings College, Madrid
- Lycée Français René-Verneau of Gran Canaria
- St. Anthony's College, Mijas
- St. Peter's School, Barcelona

== Sudan ==
- Khartoum American School
- Khartoum International Community School
- Unity High School

== Sweden ==
- Bladins International School of Malmö
- British International School of Stockholm
- Deutsche Schule Stockholm
- Internationella Engelska Skolan
- International School of the Gothenburg Region
- Kungsholmens gymnasium
- Lycée Français de Stockholm
- Sigtunaskolan Humanistiska Läroverket
- Stockholm International School

== Switzerland ==
- Aiglon College
- American School in Switzerland
- Brillantmont International School
- Collège Alpin International Beau Soleil
- Collège Champittet
- Collège du Léman
- Ecole d'Humanité
- École nouvelle de la Suisse romande
- GEMS World Academy - Etoy
- Geneva English School
- Inter-Community School Zürich
- International School Basel
- International School of Central Switzerland
- International School of Geneva
- International School of Lausanne
- International School of Zug and Luzern
- International School Zurich North
- Institut auf dem Rosenberg
- Institut International de Lancy
- Institut Le Rosey
- Japanese School in Zurich
- Kumon Leysin Academy of Switzerland
- La Côte International School
- Leysin American School
- SIS Swiss International School
- Villa St. Jean International School
- Zurich International School

== Syria ==
- International School of Aleppo, Aleppo

== Tajikistan ==
- Dushanbe International School

== Tanzania ==
- Aga Khan Mzizima Secondary School, Dar es Salaam
- International School of Tanganyika
- International School of Zanzibar
- UWC West Africa

== Togo ==
- American International School of Lomé
- British School of Lomé
- Ecole Internationale Arc-en-Ciel
- Lycée Français de Lomé

== Trinidad and Tobago ==
- International School of Port of Spain

== Tunisia ==
- Lycée Pierre Mendès France, Mutuelleville - French medium

== Turkey ==
- American Collegiate Institute
- Deutsche Schule Istanbul
- Istanbul International Community School
- Liceo Italiano Statale Istanbul
- Istanbul Japanese School
- MEF International School Istanbul
- Robert College
- St. George's Austrian High School
- Üsküdar American Academy

== Uganda ==
- École Française Les Grands Lacs
- International School of Uganda
- Kampala International School Uganda
- Rainbow International School

== Ukraine ==
- Kyiv International School
- Meridian International School, Kyiv
- Pechersk School International

== United Arab Emirates ==
- American Community School of Abu Dhabi
- American International School
- American School of Dubai
- British International School
- Dubai American Academy
- Dubai British School
- Dubai College
- Dubai English Speaking College
- Dubai International Academy
- Dubai International School
- Dubai Modern High School
- Dubai Japanese School
- Emirates International School
- English College Dubai
- GEMS American Academy
- German International School Abu Dhabi
- German International School Dubai
- German International School Sharjah
- International Indian School Ajman
- Japanese School in Abu Dhabi
- Jumeirah English Speaking School
- Lycée Français International de Dubaï
- Nord Anglia International School
- Our Own High School
- Ras Al Khaimah Academy
- Raha International School
- Ryan International School
- Sharjah American International School
- Sharjah Indian School
- The Abu Dhabi Indian School
- The Indian High School

== United Kingdom ==
- ACS International Schools, Cobham, Egham, London
- American School in London
- Anglo European School, Ingatestone, Essex
- Box Hill School, Mickleham, Surrey
- Buckswood School, Guestling, East Sussex
- Cambridge International School
- EIFA International School London
- EF International Academy, Oxford
- European School, Culham, Oxfordshire
- German School London
- Greek Secondary School of London
- Hockerill Anglo-European College, Bishop's Stortford, Hertfordshire
- ICS London
- International Community School, London
- International School of Aberdeen
- Lycée Français Charles de Gaulle, London
- Marymount International School London
- St Clare's International School, Oxford
- Southbank International School, London
- TASIS England, Thorpe, Surrey
- Japanese School in London
- Rikkyo School in England, Rudgwick, West Sussex
- Sherborne International, Sherborne, Dorset
- Teikyo School United Kingdom, Wexham, Buckinghamshire,
- UWC Atlantic, Llantwit Major

== Uruguay ==
- German School of Montevideo
- Lycée Français de Montevideo
- Scuola Italiana di Montevideo
- The British Schools of Montevideo
- Uruguayan American School

== Venezuela ==
- British School, Caracas
- Colegio Humboldt, Caracas
- Colegio Internacional de Caracas
- Escuela Bella Vista
- Escuela Campo Alegre
- International Christian School
- International School of Monagas

== Vietnam ==
- ABC International School
- American International School of Saigon
- APU International School
- British International School Vietnam
- British Vietnamese International School
- British Vietnamese International School Hanoi
- European International School Ho Chi Minh City
- FOSCO International School
- International School Ho Chi Minh City
- Lycée français Alexandre Yersin, Hanoi
- Renaissance International School Saigon
- Saigon South International School
- United Nations International School of Hanoi

== Yemen ==
- Sana'a International School

== Zambia ==
- American International School of Lusaka
- Banani International Secondary School
- International School of Lusaka

== Zimbabwe ==
- École Française de Harare
- Harare International School

== See also ==
- Lists of schools
- Tetr College of Business
