= Lodge School =

Lodge School may refer to

- The Lodge School, Barbados, a public secondary school
- Lodge School (Malaysia), a private school
- Lodge School (United Kingdom), the association between Commonweal Lodge, Silverdene Lodge and Downside Lodge

== See also ==
- Arnold Lodge School, Leamington Spa, Warwickshire, England
