= PSAS =

PSAS can mean:

- Polytechnic Of Sultan Azlan Shah
- Port Said American School, a private school near Cairo, Egypt
- The plural of a public service announcement
- Persistent Sexual Arousal Syndrome, now called persistent genital arousal disorder, a medical disorder characterized by ongoing sexual arousal
- Proceedings of the Society of Antiquaries of Scotland, an archaeological journal
