= Birralee =

Birralee may refer to:

- Birralee, Belair, a mansion in Belair, South Australia
- Birralee, Glenelg, a mansion in Glenelg, South Australia
- Birralee International School Trondheim, Norway
- Birralee, Tasmania, a locality in the Meander Valley Council
- Bride at Birralee, a novel by Marion Lennox
- Brisbane Birralee Voices, a children's community choir
- Repatriation Hospital "Birralee", a subsequent use of Birralee, Belair
