= Vale Verde International School =

International school in Burgau, Algarve, Portugal

Coordinates: 37°4′38.3″N 8°45′58.5″W

Information
- Established: 2002
- Age: 5 to 18
- Language: English, Portuguese
- Website: https://www.vvis.org/

Vale Verde International School (VVIS) is an international school located in Burgau, Algarve, Portugal. The school was established in 2002 when it obtained its official license from the Ministry of Education. The school is one of two licensed international private primary schools in the Western Algarve. VVIS has an emphasis on British education and follows a modified version of the English curriculum and prepares students for IGCSE and A level examinations. All IGCSE subjects are based on the Cambridge University curriculum. Admission to the school is dependent on a successful interview and entry examination.

The school became a member of the European Council of International Schools ECIS and the Council of International Schools CIS. It is also an accredited University of Cambridge Examinations Centre, one of only five school centres in the Algarve.

In 2007 it received planning permission to build Portugal's first bilingual primary school which delivers some subjects in Portuguese.. The buildings were officially opened in August 2010 and are fully air conditioned. The bilingual concept took two years to devise and formed the basis of a Masters in International Education dissertation by its director, Louise De Beer.

VVIS also completed a purpose built theatre, which is used for the schools art, drama, and music lessons, in 2008, following the successful addition of a sports centre and an adaptable marque for open air productions and dining purposes.

== See also ==
- List of international schools
