= Danube International School Vienna =

Private international school in Vienna, Austria

Coordinates: 48.2100°N 16.3973°E

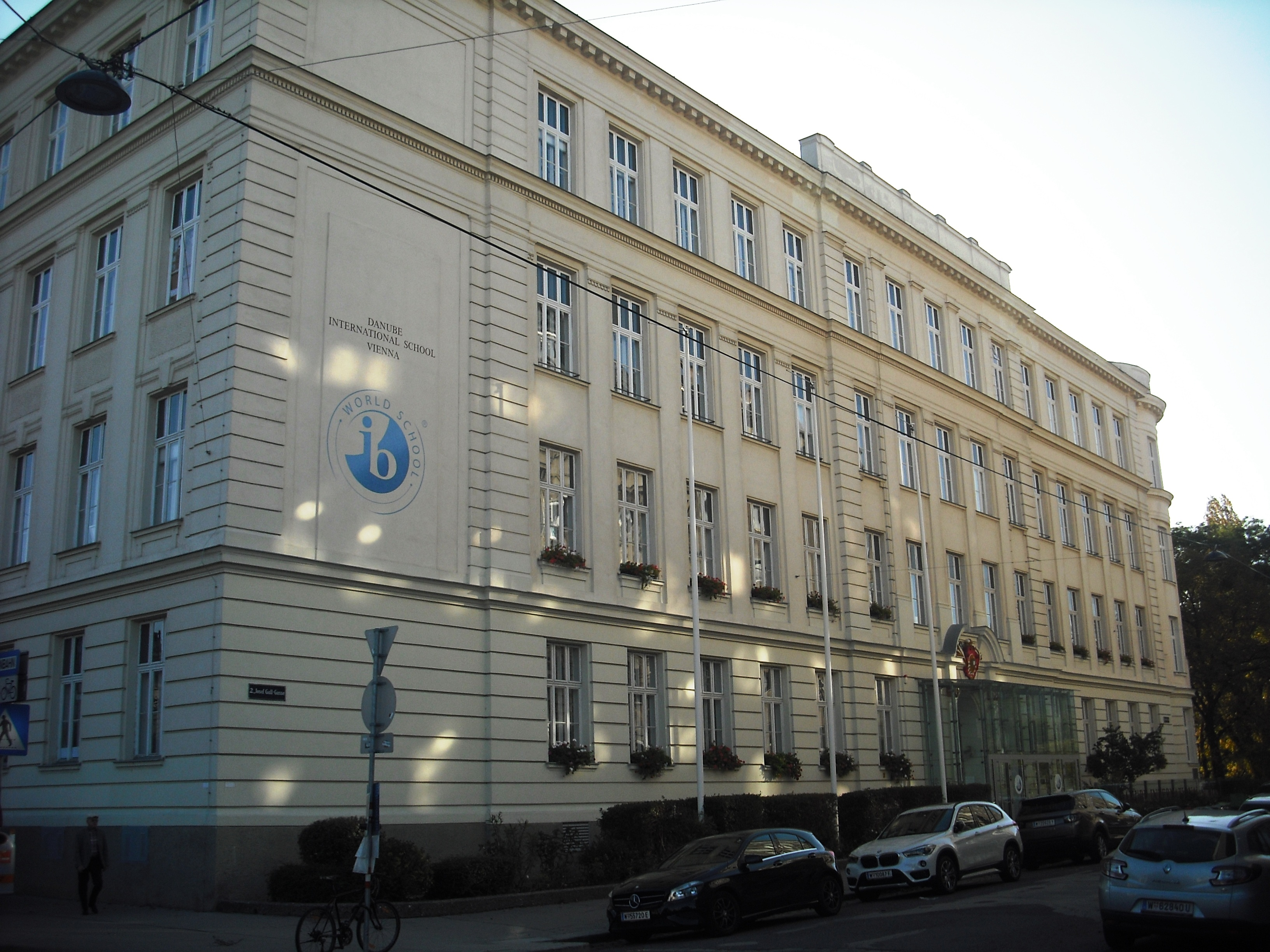
Danube International School Vienna

Danube International School Vienna (DISV) is a private international school in Vienna, Austria. It is located in the Second District, between the Danube Canal and the Prater.

The school is privately owned and managed and is accredited by the Austrian government. It is evaluated by the International Baccalaureate Organisation (IBO).

== History ==
The school began in 1990 as a response to quotas imposed by the other international schools in Vienna, which had restrictions on the number of Austrians that could attend their schools. The school started as Pawen International Community School with 9 students and by the end of the first year, in June 1992, the intake had risen to over 170 students. The school reformed as Danube International School Vienna in 1992 and international students were allowed to enroll. The school outgrew the first building in Schrutkagasse in the 13th District of Vienna (which now houses a Rudolf Steiner School), and relocated to a building at Gudrunstraße 184, in the 10th District. That location was home to DISV from 1992 to 1999.

== Current state ==
Danube International School Vienna is located at Josef-Gall-Gasse 2 in Leopoldstadt, Vienna's 2nd district. According to the school's published fee schedule for 2026–27, standard annual tuition ranges from €18,226 for its lowest listed level to €35,240 for Grade 12.
