= International School São Lourenço =

Location
- Sítio da Rabona; 8135 Almancil; Algarve; Portugal
- Coordinates: 37.10000°N 8.02445°W

Information
- Established: 1978
- Website: algarveschool.com

International School São Lourenço (ISSL) is an international school located in Almancil in Algarve, Portugal.

Founded in 1978 and a private fee-paying school, ISSL is a nonprofit organisation. It has been run since 2006 by a Board of Governors composed of parents elected by the Parent Teacher Association (PTA).

Children from the ages of 3 to 18 attending ISSL enjoy an exceptional education. The school operates with the internationally recognised and demanding Cambridge IGCSE and A-Level programme of study. This programme offers a broad choice of curriculum and has a reputation for developing successful students.

ISSL has integrated the teaching of the national language and culture into their curriculum, with a department of dedicated and qualified Portuguese staff specialising in the teaching of their country's language and culture. Portuguese language lessons are now mandatory at the younger levels with children taking these classes divided into groups according to their linguistic skill level. This will increase the opportunity for those attending the school to leave it fully bi-lingual.

Portuguese children at the school, meanwhile, achieve an education in English while still being able to learn their own language and literature in accordance with the Portuguese Education Ministry programme.

== See also ==
- List of international schools
