= International School of Georgia =

Address
- 35 Tskneti Highway 0162; Bagebi, Tbilisi; Georgia
- Coordinates: 41°42′38″N 44°43′48″E

Information
- Established: 1999
- Founder: Marina Zhgenti
- Age: 5 to 18
- Language: English, Georgian
- Website: http://newschoolgeorgia.com/

New School, International School of Georgia is a primary and secondary international school in Tbilisi, Georgia, serving local and expatriate children from ages 3 to 18. Its curriculum, delivered in English (the English Department) or Georgian (the Georgian Department) conforms with standards of international education. It is accredited by the International Baccalaureate Organisation.

== Organisation ==
The school has students from many countries. It is Georgia's only school offering all three International Baccalaureate levels: the PYP (Primary Years Programme), MYP (Middle Years Programme) and IB Diploma Programme.

The school has an active extracurricular programme with sports, ski trips, talent shows, field trips and other activities.

== History ==
The school was founded in 1999.

== See also ==
- Education in Georgia (country)
- International Baccalaureate
- List of international schools
