= Lycée Français de Lomé =

French international school in Lomé, Togo

Location
- 6.12675°N 1.2064°E

Information
- School type: International School
- Language: French
- Website: https://www.lfl-togo.org/

The Lycée Français de Lomé (LFL) is a French international school in Nyékonakpoé, Lomé, Togo. It includes primaire (primary), collège (junior high school), and lycée (senior high school) levels.

Its current primary school facility, école Charles-de-Gaulle, opened in 2016.

== See also ==
- List of international schools
- Education in Togo
- Institut français du Togo
