= Colegio Interamericano =

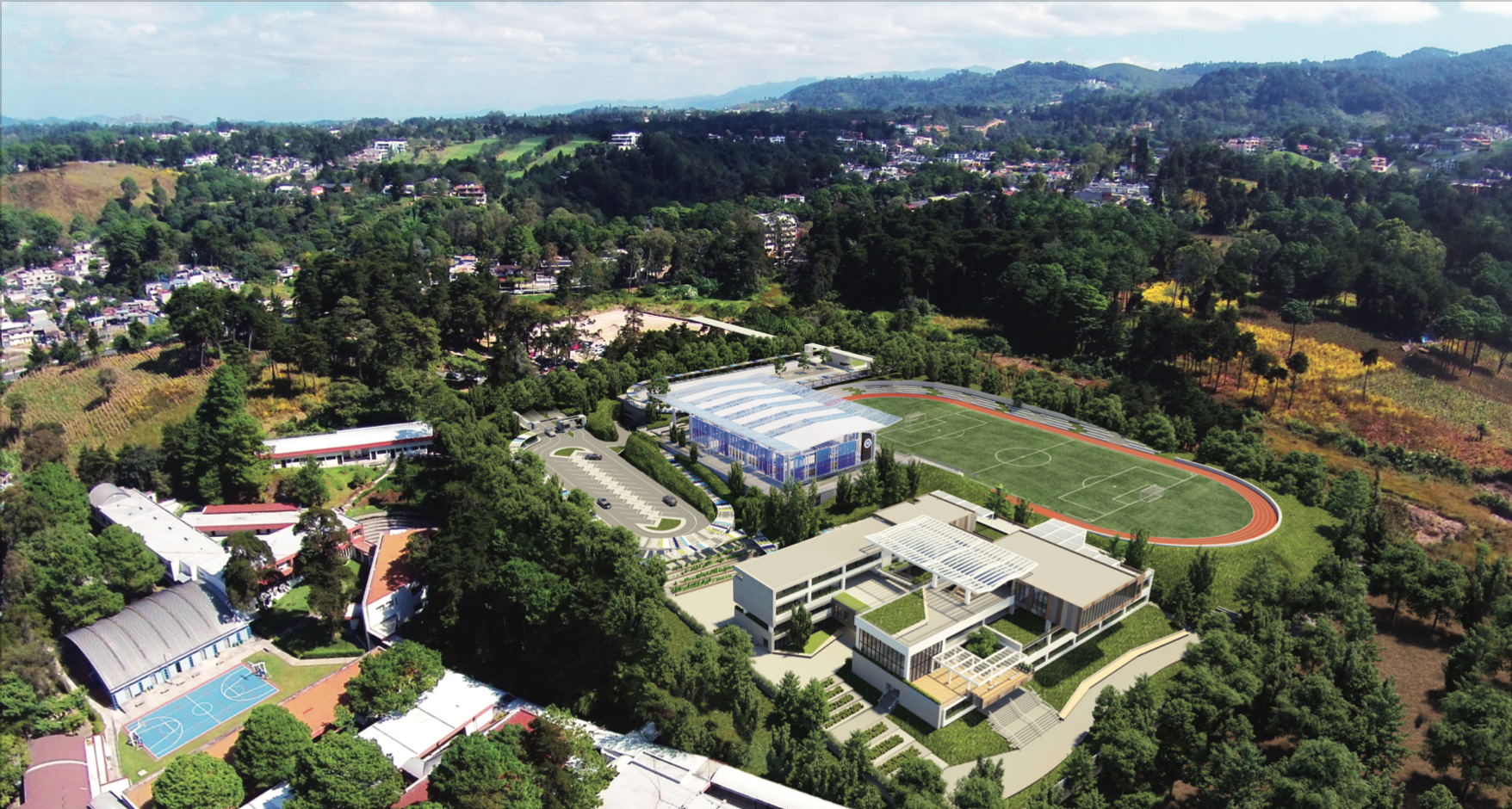
- An aerial photo of Colegio Interamericano, in 2020

Location
- Boulevard La Montana, Apartado 1681, Fca. El Socorro, Zona 16; Guatemala City; Guatemala

Information
- Other name: Colegio Interamericano de Guatemala
- Type: Private international pre-school, primary and secondary school
- Established: 1976; 49 years ago
- Founders: Alumni of American School Guatemala
- Principal: Dr. Sharon Canadine
- Grades: Pre-school; K-12
- Language: English; Spanish
- Affiliations: Southern Association of Colleges and Schools; AdvancEd, Cognia; Association of American Schools in Central America
- Website: www.interamericano.edu.gt

Colegio Interamericano is a private international pre-school, primary and secondary school located in Zone 16 of Guatemala City, Guatemala. Founded in 1976, the bilingual school serves approximately 1,300 students and is accredited with the Southern Association of Colleges and Schools and AdvancEd, Cognia; and is a member of the Association of American Schools in Central America (AASCA).

Students that graduate from Colegio Interamericano receive both the American High School Diploma and the Guatemalan Diploma (Spanish: Bachillerato en Ciencias y Letras).

== History ==
Colegio Interamericano was founded in 1976 by the alumni of American School Guatemala, another international school in Guatemala City. In 1981, Colegio Interamericano relocated to its current location in Zone 16, and received its United States accreditation in 1989. The school is accredited by Cognia and in 2024 received its five-year accreditation renewal. The school has an Early Childhood Education, Elementary School, Middle School, and High School system of education.

== See also ==
- Education in Guatemala
- List of international schools
