= Vilamoura International School =

- Vilamoura; Portugal

Information
- Type: Private Day School
- Motto: Educational excellence for life
- Established: 1984
- Director: Mrs. Cidália Bicho
- Gender: Co-educational
- Age: 2 to 18
- Enrolment: 660 pupils (approx.)
- Colours: Navy & Yellow
- Athletics: Football, Cross Country, Basketball, Track and Field, Tennis
- Website: http://civ.pt/en

Vilamoura International School is a co-educational Independent day school located in Vilamoura, Portugal, founded in 1984 by a group of parents and teachers with the aim of providing a quality education to a small group of students which eventually grew to over 600.

== School ==
It is an International school, which follows an English and Portuguese curriculum up to IGCSE, AS and A-Level Cambridge exams and a National section where Portuguese is taught as a first language and the National Curriculum is taught. French and German are taught as foreign languages. The school has some 660 pupils of over 30 nationalities. In recent years, the practical success of a learning and creative environment has received attention from the scientific community. In 2009, it reached the top high schools in the world in scientific research and in 2011 topped the annual ranking of secondary schools according to the Ministry of Education. Currently, it has a significant community of alumni scattered by various parts of the world, from Europe to Asia, the U.S. and Australia.

=== Sports Facilities ===
Within the college grounds, there are playing fields. These include, football pitches, volleyball courts, tennis courts, basketball courts, handball courts, and two gymnasiums. Students are actively encouraged to play Golf and conditions are provided for this at nearby Golf Courses.

== Curriculum ==
The International Section of Vilamoura International School follows the Cambridge Assessment International Education curriculum.

The subjects which are currently offered at AS/A Level are:

Humanities	English Language, History, French, Portuguese
Sciences	Chemistry, Biology, and Physics.
Arts	Art and Design
Statistical Sciences	IT, Mathematics, Business Studies

== School terms ==
There are three academic terms in the year:

- The First Term, from early September to mid December
- The Second Term, from mid January to late March;
- The Third Term, from late April to late June. Senior Secondary students commence study leave during this term in order to study for the Cambridge Exams which are sat in May/June.
