= International School of Zanzibar =

The International School of Zanzibar

Location
- Zanzibar; Tanzania
- 6°12′11″S 39°12′28″E

Information
- Type: International School
- Established: 1988; 38 years ago
- Locale: Kiembe Samaki
- Head of School: Mark McCarthy
- Years offered: Pre-kindergarten – grade 13
- Enrollment: 200 +
- Colors: Green, blue, and yellow
- Website: isz.co.tz

The International School of Zanzibar is a private international school located on the island of Zanzibar, Tanzania. As of 2018, the School educated students from over 29 countries, aged from 2 to 19 years, from pre-kindergarten, to Year 13. The official language, and language of instruction of the school is English. The academic programs are IPC, Cambridge International Lower Secondary, International General Certificate of Secondary Education (IGCSE) and Cambridge International AS/A-Level. Established in 1988, in 2018 there were approximately 200 students enrolled in the school.

The school is located in East Africa, Tanzania, Zanzibar, in the Mazizini area which is 5 minutes from the airport and 10 minutes from Stone Town.

== History ==
The International School of Zanzibar was founded by parents from foreign countries as a play area for their children. It is a community school catering to both local and foreign families, especially those interested in the Cambridge International curriculum.

== Curriculum ==
In principle the International School of Zanzibar follows the National Curriculum for England including the administration of IGCSEs and AS/A-Level exams (the school is an accredited Cambridge Examination Centre that also accepts private candidates). Included in the curriculum are English, mathematics, science, history, geography, information technology, Swahili language, French language, music, physical education & swimming.

== More information ==
The school grew from 10 children in 1988 to more than 200 by October 2015. In 2021, the school graduated its first Year 13 class, with students continuing their studies in the UK, Switzerland, and Tanzania. The school amenities include a swimming pool, science lab, tennis court, football field, art room, and an ICT (Information and Communication Technology) lab. The school employs a diverse teaching staff from around the world, such as Zanzibar, mainland Tanzania, the United States, the United Kingdom, Belgium, and South Africa.

The school has an international student body, with enrolments across all age ranges, representing 29 different countries. These include Tanzanian (46%), Germany (7%), the United Kingdom (6%), Italian (5%), Egyptian (4%), Finnish (3%), and Spanish (3%). The remaining 27% of the student population comes from 22 other nations.
