= American International School of Lusaka =

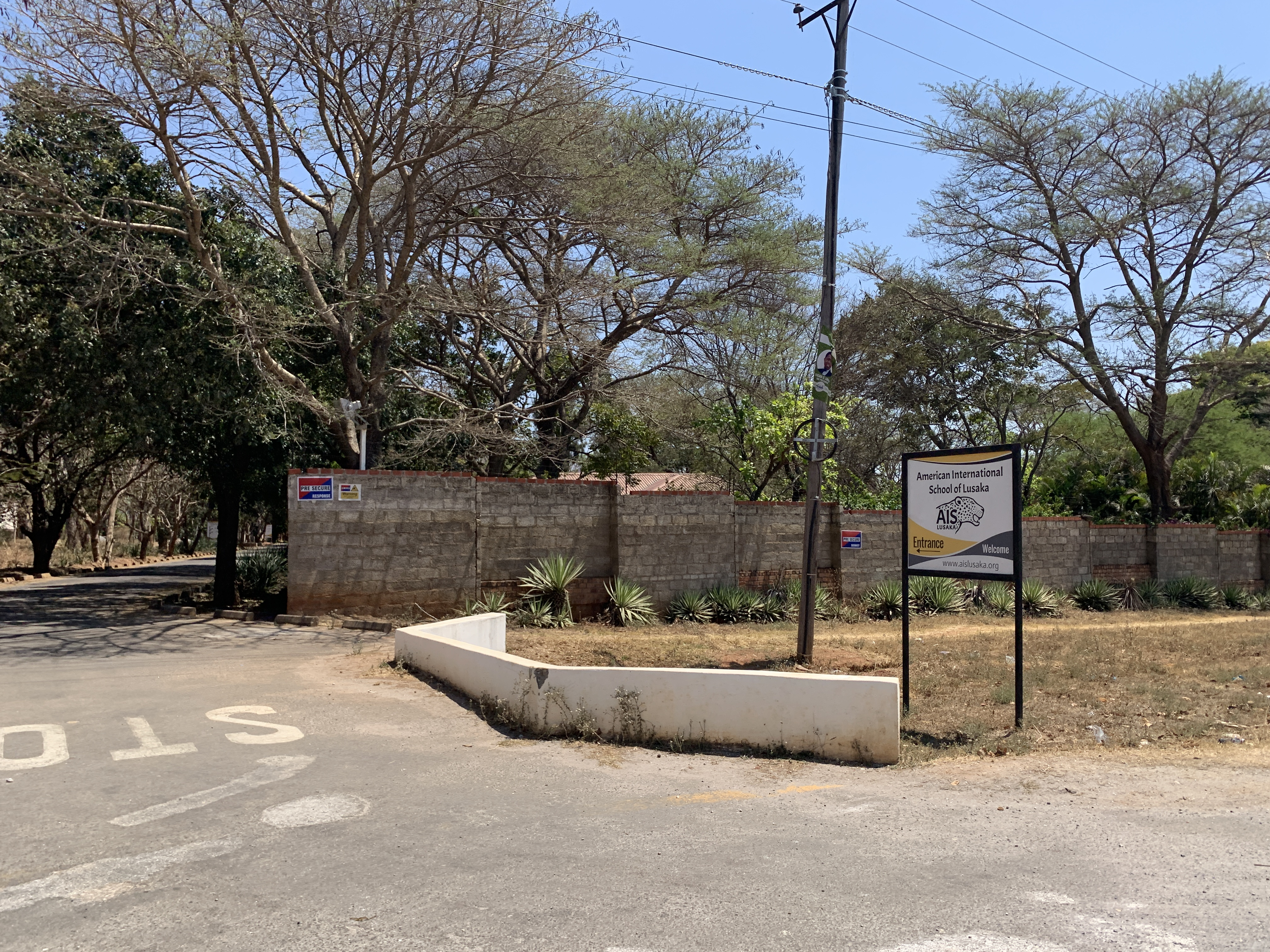

Location
- Lusaka, Zambia
- Coordinates: 15.4730°S 28.3926°E

Information
- School type: Independent school
- Founded: 1986
- Grades: P-12
- Gender: Co-Educational
- Enrolment: 580
- Average class size: 20
- Education system: International Baccalaureate
- Language: English
- Mascot: Leopard
- Website: American International School of Lusaka

American International School of Lusaka (AISL) is an American international school in Lusaka, Zambia. It serves students of ages 3–18.

== History ==
The school was established in 1986.

== Student body ==
As of 2015 the school has about 580 students, with 35% of European nationalities, 33% of African nationalities, 24% of North American and South American nationalities, and 8% of Australasian nationalities.

As of 2020 the school now has over 500 students, with The school attracts students from a wide range of nationalities, including approximately 26% European, 31% North and South American, 28% African. Including these nationalities there are 41 nationalities represented. The student to teacher ratio is 1:8 and a 1:1 Laptop/iPad Program.

== Education ==
AISL has MYP, PYP, DP, and the International Baccalaureate Diploma.

== Facilities ==
As of 20 August 2020, AISL has just finished renovations on the primary school and the carpark. This has modernised all of the early years up to grade 6. It has also changed the liberty.
