= Embassy International School =

International school in Krakow, Poland

Coordinates: 50.0729°N 19.9246°E

Embassy International School (Polish: Szkoła Międzynarodowa) is an international school in Kraków, Poland, offering A levels. It serves an age range of 3 to 18/19.

Embassy International School offers education for the international and local community of all ages, from 3 to 19, from Nursery (Kindergarten) to the end of high school exams (A levels).

Their pupils are recruited from the expat community as well as the local community and represent more than 25 nationalities.
