= The Regent School =

The Regent School is a British-style co-education school established to cater for children of British expatriate working in the city. It is located in Abuja, the federal capital territory of Nigeria. It was established in 2000.

The Regent School is the first British School Overseas (BSO) in Nigeria, and the first to have an outstanding school inspection report as adjudged by PENTA, a DfE-approved directorate of inspections for British Schools Overseas (BSO) and iQTS.

The Regent School, Abuja stands proud to be regarded as the best school in Nigeria as a result of their achievements and standards over the years.

== History ==
The school started with the admission of primary school pupils from ages 2 to 11. Senior school opened in 2007.

== Enrollment ==
The school has 500 pupils in primary and 600 pupils in the secondary school. The secondary school offers both a day and boarding option. The boarding has 4 houses, 2 male and 2 female.

== House system ==
The house system is a way of facilitating relationships among the pupils and also to enhance their team and leadership spirit. Each house is coordinated by a prefect. The house system operates on unit bases. The maximum points that can be earned are 25 units. Certificates and badges are the rewards for good behaviour. Most houses are named after African countries. The four houses in the school are:

- Red House :Congo
- Blue House :Benue
- Yellow House :Senegal
- Green House :Volta

== Curriculum ==
As a British styled school, it offers the following curriculum:

1. National Curriculum for England and Wales in year 7 and 8.
2. CIE Checkpoint in Year 9
3. CIE IGCSE in Year 10 and 11

== Alumni ==
The Regent School established The Alumni as a way of developing relationships among the pupils that have left the school and those that are still in the school.

== Parent-teacher association ==
This is a group of volunteer parents who contribute money towards the community. PTA links the parents and teachers to discuss ways of developing the school.
