= European School of Costa Rica =

Coordinates: 9.99519°N 84.10327°W

Information
- Established: 1989; 37 years ago
- Grades: K-12
- Enrollment: c.500
- Average class size: max. 20
- Language: English; Spanish; French

The European School of Costa Rica is a K-12 International Baccalaureate school located in San Pablo de Heredia, Costa Rica with enrollment of approximately 500. It was founded in 1989.

== Languages ==
Instruction is in English, Spanish and French. Sixty percent of the students are Costa Rican. Assistance is provided in Spanish and French. Teachers originate from over a dozen countries.

== Academics ==
The curriculum is created by director Anne Aronson. Class size is capped at 20. Enrollees attend lunch with their teachers. Student conduct and responsibility is a focal point of the daily curriculum, in addition to mandatory annual class trips within Costa Rica.

== Facilities ==
The school has soccer fields, basketball courts, a gymnasium, and string music program.

== Events ==
This school has many special events in its calendar: Wearable Arts, School Picnic, I.B. Art exhibit, Trash Picking, 15 de Septiembre, Valentines Day, Halloween, State Fair. These are all celebrations on a specific date where students partake in several activities.
