= French School in Ljubljana =

Coordinates: 46°2′2.0″N 14°30′13.2″E

French School in Ljubljana École Française internationale de Ljubljana

Address
- Ulica Dušana Kraigherja 2, 1000 Ljubljana

Information
- Established: 1991
- Principal: Marie-Thérèse Furic
- Age range: 2–15
- Website: http://www.efl.si/en/

The French School in Ljubljana (EFL; French: École Française internationale de Ljubljana) is a school in Slovenia that caters to students from over 15 nationalities, ranging from 3 to 15 years of age. It was established in 1991.

== Location ==
The French School in Ljubljana is located in Ljubljana's Trnovo District in the premises of Livada Primary School (Slovene: Osnovna šola Livada). It is in a mixed-used area containing residential housing and some small businesses. Mali Graben, a branch of the Gradaščica River, flows past the neighborhood to the northwest, and the Ljubljanica River lies to the east.
