= International School of Tegucigalpa =

Location
- P.O. BOX 5210 and 2282; Tegucigalpa, Francisco Morazán, Honduras; Honduras
- Coordinates: 14.04437°N 87.19990°W

Information
- Type: Private Co-educational
- Established: 1991
- Founder: Bertha de Flores
- Faculty: 150
- Grades: Pre-K-12
- Enrollment: 1177
- Colors: Blue, Gold & White
- Athletics: ABSH Tigers
- Mascot: Tigers
- Website: http://www.internationalschool.hn

International School of Tegucigalpa, (IST) is a private N-12 American standard based school in Tegucigalpa, Honduras. Its current enrollment is approximately 2,000 students. IST was founded in 1991 and in June 1992 graduated its first senior class.

== Student body ==
86% of the student body is comprised Hondurans, 8% North America, 6% Multi-ethnic. IST has a 99.9% graduation rate and graduates traditionally continue on to study in four year universities. Approximately 25-30% of the graduating class study abroad, in the United States or other foreign countries.

== Faculty and administration ==
The minimum requirements for IST teachers is to hold a bachelor's degree and/or have a teaching license.

== Accreditation ==
IST is Internationally accredited through AdvancED. The Honduran National Ministry of Education accredited IST and even went as far as naming it the best school in the capital. ACSI has commended and accredited IST.
