= Heidelberg International School =

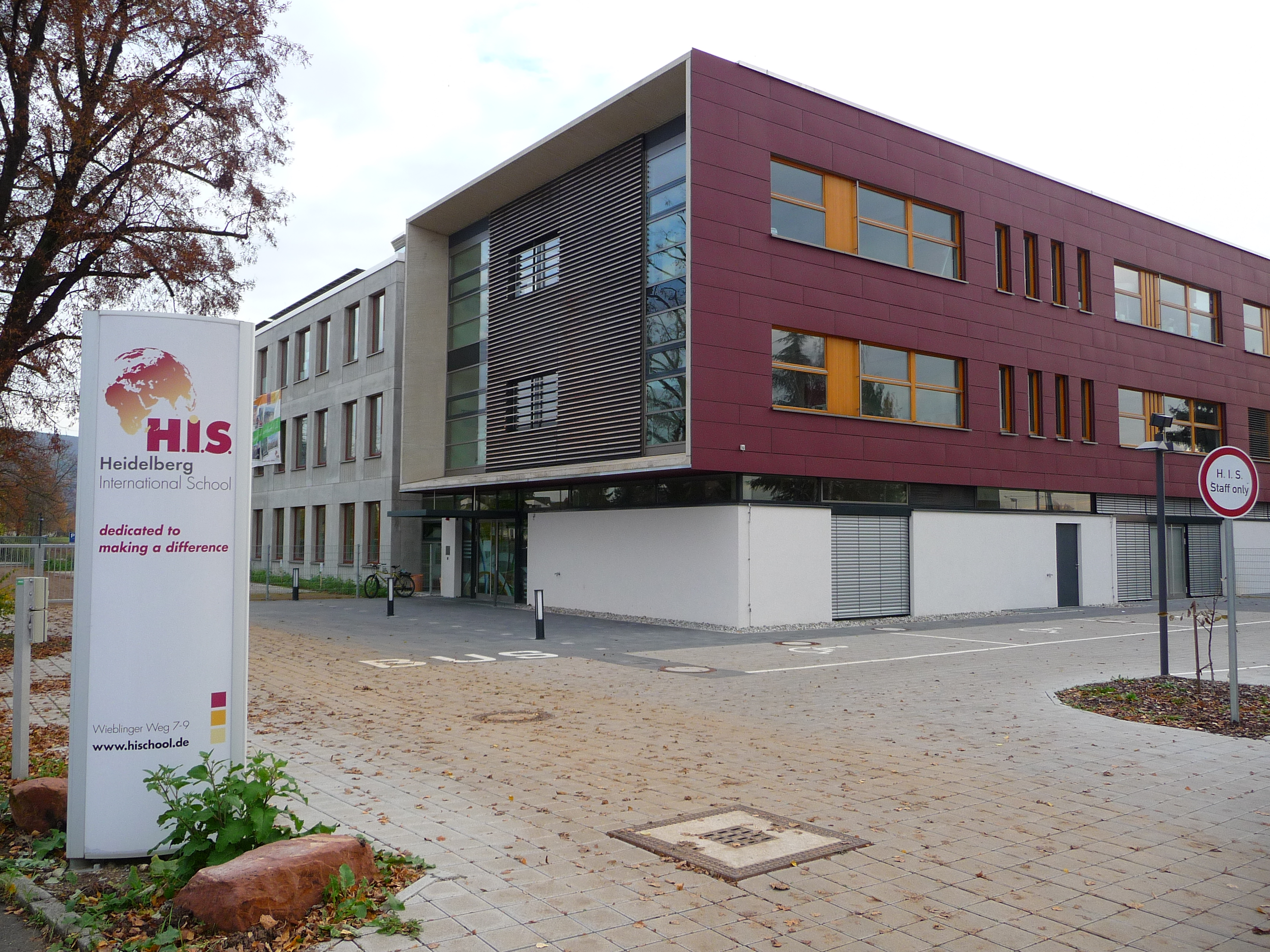

Location
- Rhine-Neckar Metropolitan Region; Germany; 49.4087°N 8.6621°E

Information
- Type: International School
- Established: 9 September 2000
- Enrollment: 222 (March 16, 2013)
- Website: HIS Website

The Heidelberg International School (H.I.S.), located in the Rhine-Neckar Metropolitan Region, is a private International Baccalaureate (IB) World School for globally mobile and local internationally minded students aged 4–19.

== History ==
The school was founded on 9 September 2000 in Karlsruhe, using rooms rented from a kindergarten. Nine students were enrolled.

Growing student numbers determined the need for a larger building. As appropriate facilities could not be found in Karlsruhe, the search was extended, until the Villa Heinstein in Heidelberg, was found. The school moved to Heidelberg in the summer of 2002, and was renamed the Heidelberg International School (H.I.S.).

The official opening of H.I.S. was celebrated on October 2, 2002.

Since then, the school enrollment numbers have grown continually. An extension building was erected in 2003 behind the villa in order to make space for additional classes, larger classrooms and resources.

In the summer of 2005 a second floor was added to the extension building, providing even more classrooms and resource facilities.

The construction of a new, purpose-built facility directly adjacent to the Villa Heinstein represents the current progress in the school’s expansion.

=== New building ===
In August 2008, H.I.S. moved into new facilities, consisting of three inter-connected buildings of more than 4,000 square metres.

There are currently more than 220 students enrolled in H.I.S. specifically 222 as of March 16, 2013

=== Extension 2018 ===
In November 2018, the official ceremony for the new extension building took place. The new extension includes new offices for several teaching staff, a new staff room, and a few new classrooms. A new playground was also organised. New climbing racks were built and a new sand pit too.
