= Lycée International Georges Duby =

Coordinates: 43.4798°N 5.4126°E

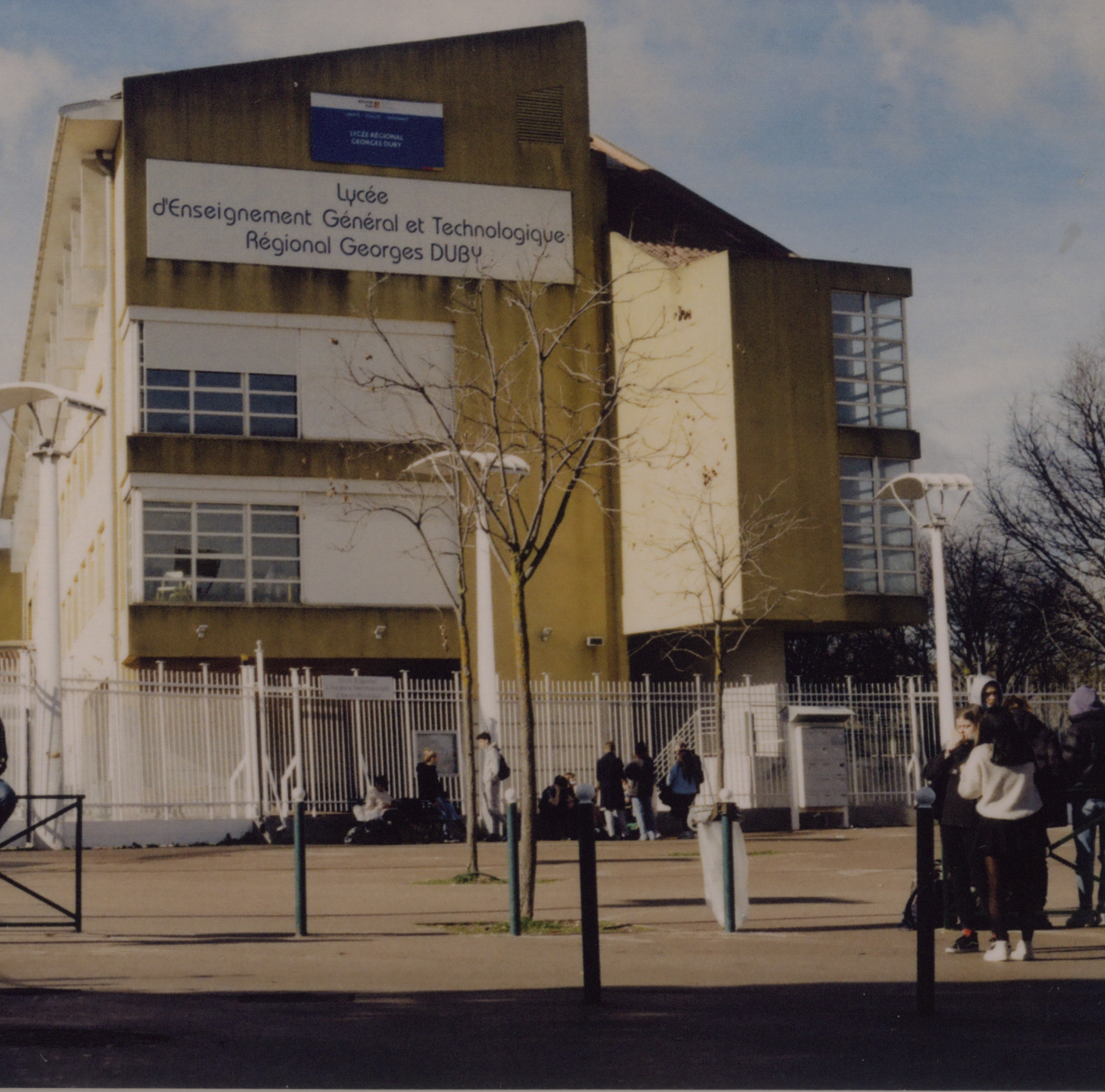

Location
- 200 Rue Georges Duby; PACA; Luynes; France

Information
- School type: Public
- Established: 1997
- Educational authority: Aix-marseille
- Principal: Virginie Leydet
- Years taught: Grades 10-12
- Language: French, English, German

Lycée International Georges Duby (Georges Duby International High School) is a non fee-paying state high school in southern France, which prepares students for the French Baccalauréat. Students in the main section of the lycée are drawn from the residential areas of the southern suburbs of Aix-en-Provence.

The lycée is also accessible via a competitive entrance process for students interested in joining the British International Section (FR) or the German Bi-National Section.

== Location ==
The lycée is located on a hillside in the village of Luynes, on the southern outskirts of Aix-en-Provence. The surrounding area includes residential neighborhoods and the Montagne Sainte-Victoire.

The site for the school buildings was chosen to combine accessibility to urban centers with a calm environment suitable for education.

== History ==
The school is named after Georges Duby, an influential twentieth-century historian who taught at the University of Aix-en-Provence.

== Specializations ==
The Lycée provides three years of French secondary education to students ages 15 to 18.

The first-year students are typically 15 or 16 and are called Secondes, the equivalent of the American term Sophomores. During this year the students take the same general courses.

The second-year students are 16 to 17 and are called Premieres, or Juniors. After the first year, students are expected to choose three different spécialité, three academic specializations similar to “majors” at an American university. During this year the students take courses in their spécialité, such as :

- History geography, geopolitics, and political science
- Math
- Physics and chemistry
- Economic and social science
- Biology
- History of arts
- Humanities and philosophy
- English literature

They can also choose a technical série, including sciences et technologies de la gestion (STMG) – Management Sciences and Technologies.

The third-year students are 17 or 18 and are called Terminales, or Seniors. They are required to drop one of their three speciality courses and keep two instead.

If a student desires to pursue professional, post–baccalauréat studies at the lycée, he or she can apply for a two-year course entitled the Brevet de technicien suppérieur (BTS). It is a professional education in international trade and business, training students through a combination of coursework, internships in companies, and other training periods. Students who complete the program are prepared to be professional international businesspeople.

== International Sections ==
The lycée has two international sections, the English Section and the French-German Section.

=== The British Section ===
The English Section plays an important role in the lycée. There are upwards of 350 students in the section of whom one third are native English speakers (Anglophones). Students in the section follow mainstream courses in common with the students in the rest of the lycée, but they spend 10 hours per week in specific classes designed to cater for the international objectives of the students and to fulfil the aims of the school.

Up until Class of 2023, the British section was part of a diploma known as Option Internationale du Baccalauréat (OIB), which has been subject to a reform by the French Ministry of education, changing its name to Baccalauréat Français International (BFI).

There are usually 5 OIB/BFI classes per Grade, of approximately 20 to 25 students.

The head of the section is Mrs Sharon Miron-Hughes, is seconded by association named AGESSIA that helps students with extra curricular activities like clubs as well as with future educational opportunities.

The OIB/BFI is not a Bi-national section (French equivalent of a dual diploma at Baccalauréat level), and its students graduate with a specific French Baccalauréat bearing the mention "Option Internationale" or "Section Internationale".

Nonetheless, many UK organisms, such as OxfordAQA help the French Ministry of Education in achieving the dire task of maintaining both UK and French standards of education. As a result, the OIB/BFI allows students for direct applications to undergraduate degrees in most UK universities with no proof of English proficiency being needed, and an equivalence of subjects between A-levels and Spécialités, as well as A-Level English with OIB/BFI English Language and Literature, and A-Levels History / Geography with OIB/BFI History-Geography subject.

Lycée Georges Duby's international section is a member of ASIBA, an association that helps coordinating the different British and American sections of the OIB/BFI in and out of France. They help with the drafting of mock-exams, or the diffusion of the specific curriculums.

=== The French-German Section ===
This section is designed to deliver both the general French education and an additional German element simultaneously. The Franco-German curriculum begins in the Seconde year and lasts three years. At the end of the Terminale year, students take both the French Baccalauréat and the German Abitur qualifications.
