= Rome International School =

Private international school in Rome, Italy

Location
- Via Guglielmo Pecori Giraldi, 137 - 00135; Rome; Italy
- 41.93974°N 12.44953°E

Information
- Type: Private school, International school
- Established: 1988
- Head of School: Ms. Corina Rader
- Faculty: 91
- Gender: Co-educational
- Age: 2 to 18
- Enrolment: 519
- Education system: IB Primary Years Programme, Cambridge IGCSE, IB Diploma Programme
- Language: English
- Area: 9,000 square metres (11,000 sq yd)
- Colours: blue and green
- Affiliation: Globeducate Network
- Website: www.romeinternationalschool.it

Rome International School (RIS) is a private and co-educational international school in Rome, Italy. The school offers international education to children aged 2 to 18 years from Nursery through to Grade 13. The language of instruction is English. RIS is an International Baccalaureate School offering the IB Primary Years Programme in the Elementary School and the IB Diploma Programme in the last two years of High School. Students in Grades 10 and 11 take the Cambridge IGCSE.

== History ==
RIS opened its doors to its first Elementary School students in September 1988. The Middle School opened in September 2001 and the High School was launched in 2007. RIS was authorised to deliver the International Baccalaureate Diploma Programme in June 2009.

== Organisation ==
In 2018, Rome International School was acquired by Globeducate (formerly known as NACE Schools).

== Curriculum ==
RIS has been an International Baccalaureate World School since June 2009.

In July 2012, Rome International School received authorisation from the IB governing body in The Hague, The Netherlands to offer the IB Primary Years Programme (PYP).

RIS is a meritocratic school: advancement is based on individual ability and achievement. Admission to the school is selective, subject to interviews, entrance tests and reports from previous schools, and scholarships are available for worthy international students.

== Elementary School ==
Elementary School children from 6 to 11 years old attend the International Baccalaureate Primary Years Programme (IB PYP). The PYP encourages children to take responsibility for learning and build their skills to become lifelong learners.

The PYP is transdisciplinary, meaning students investigate big ideas supported and enriched by the traditional subject areas. The IB is committed to assuring that students in IB programmes meet and exceed local or national standards.

Students at Rome International School are educated in a transdisciplinary way in the following subjects:

- English
- Italian
- Mathematics
- Science
- History
- Geography
- The Arts:
  - Drama
  - Music
  - Visual Arts
  - PSPE (Personal, Social and Physical Education)
  - Music
  - ICT
- Science
- History and Geography (Social Studies)

== Middle School ==
Pupils from 12 to 14 years old attend Middle School. The school is not pursuing full implementation of the IB Middle Years Programme. However, many of the fundamental concepts of the MYP are included in the Middle Years curriculum with the aim of developing the qualities of the IB Learner Profile.

The Middle School programme is the range of learning resources available for Cambridge Secondary Education.

In the 2015/16 school year, the school introduced Cambridge Checkpoint for Grade 9 students, a diagnostic tool designed to assess learners at the end of the Middle Years, in English, Maths and Science.

The school offers a choice of French, Spanish, Arabic or Chinese languages and also offers students the opportunity to follow an Italian curriculum to coincide with the international curriculum where at the end of Year 9, these students can take the Italian Terza Media.

== High School ==
From 14 to 18 years old teens attend High School where Grade 10 and 11 students take the Cambridge International General Certificate of Secondary Education (IGCSE) examination at the end of Grade 11 and successful applicants can then take the two-year IB Diploma Programme and are also able to take the Italian Maturità.

== Location and facilities ==
In July 2014, Rome International School relocated to a new campus in Via Guglielmo Pecori Giraldi, 137. The campus is situated in a natural park of over 3.5 hectares (8.6 acres) and has a covered surface area of around 9,000 square metres (11,000 sq yd). It features a 230-seat auditorium, two gyms, a cross-country running track, large external sports grounds, and ample recreational and study areas.
