= Birralee International School Trondheim =

School in Trondheim, Norway

Coordinates: 63°25′38.5″N 10°23′29″E

- Motto: Disce ut vivas (Learn to live)
- Type: International school, private school
- Established: Autumn 1973
- Founders: Margot L. Tønseth
- Principal: Elin Hitchman
- Academic staff: 50
- Students: 290
- Location: Bispegata 9C, 7013 Trondheim, Trondheim, Norway
- Website: www.birralee.no/

Birralee International School Trondheim is a certified Cambridge International School. It was founded in 1973 and is one of the oldest international schools in Norway. The Australian founder gave the school the name "Birralee," meaning a "safe place for children". While a private school, the school is non-profit and co-educational.

== About ==
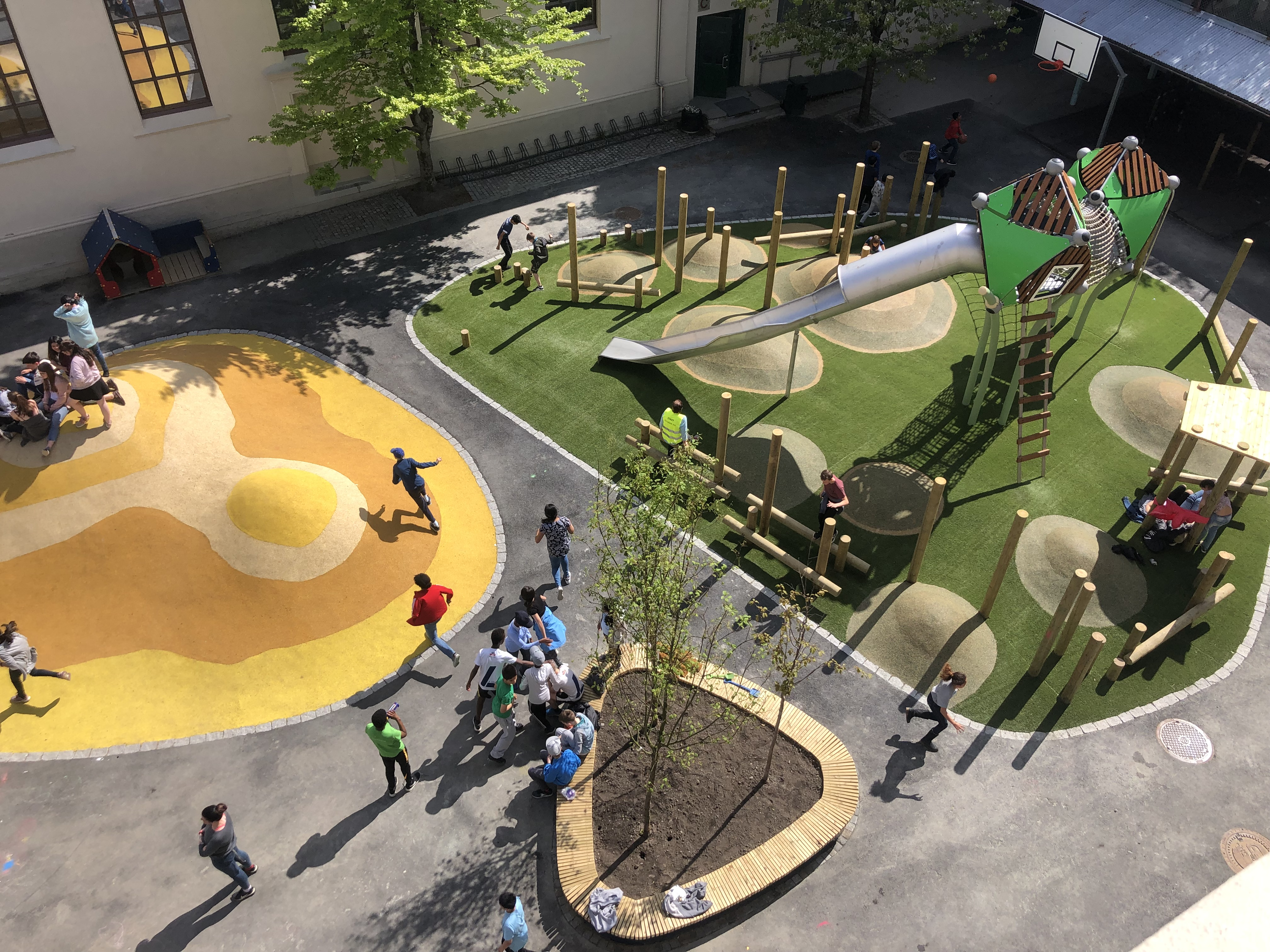
School playground

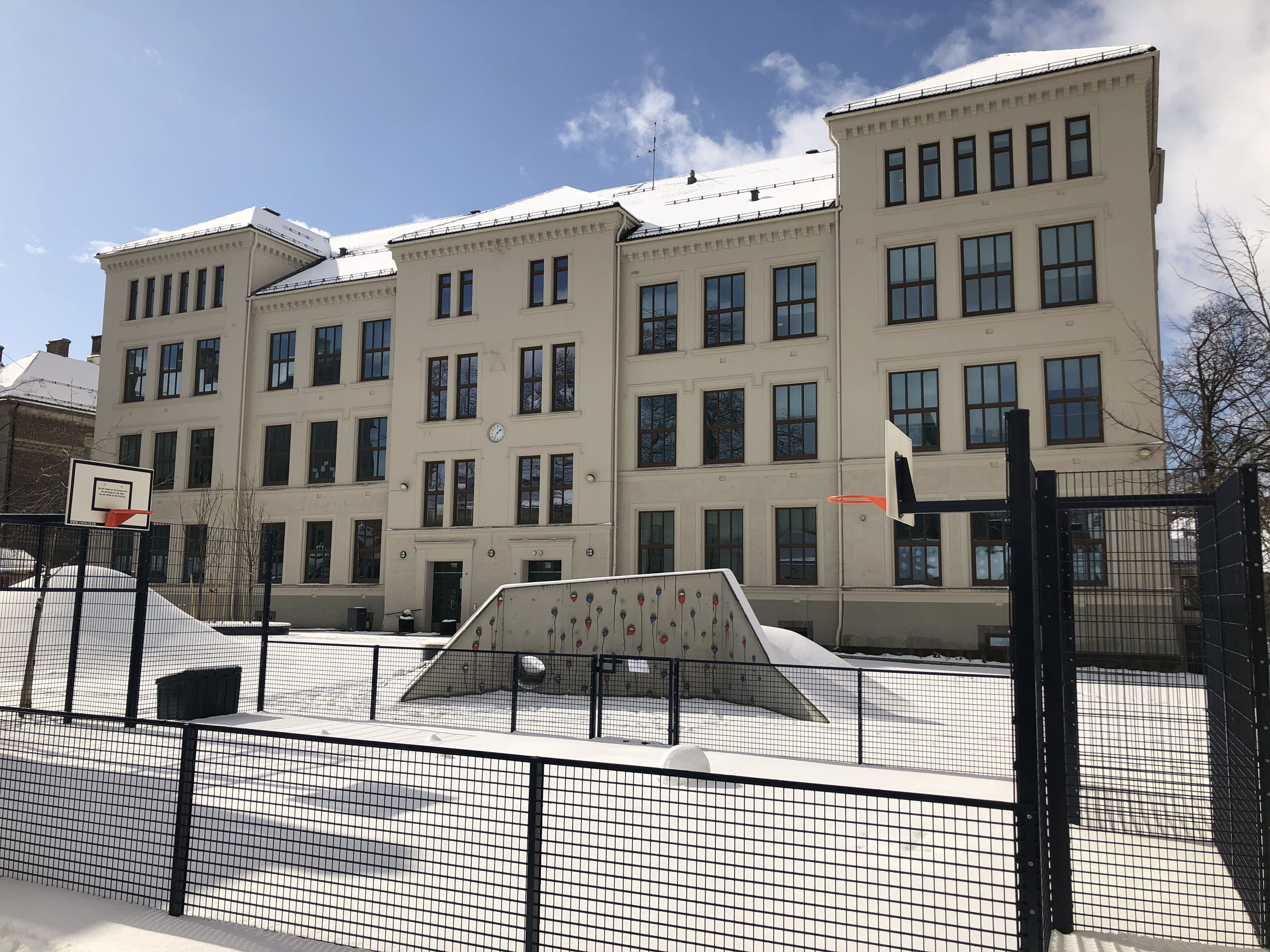
Main building

The school consists of a Kindergarten, a Primary School and a Middle School, and accepts children from 3 to 16 years of age. Birralee International School Trondheim is home to 320 students, 40 teachers and 15 assistants, and is the biggest international school in Trondheim.

Since 1977, the school is located at Kalvskinnet in the heart of Trondheim, close to the famous medieval Nidaros Cathedral. The school is easily accessible by public transport and bicycle. Students who live more than four kilometers away are offered a free bus card.

English is the language of instruction in all subjects at Birralee International School Trondheim. In addition, the children have four to five Norwegian lessons per week. The school offers a diverse after-school program.

== Close ties to NTNU ==
The school has close ties to the Norwegian University of Science and Technology, Norway's biggest university. Many of the school's students have family members who work at the university. The school also offers student teacher placements to student teachers at NTNU's Teacher Training Programme. Birralee International School Trondheim is also a full research partner in NTNU's MOST project.

== Awards ==
In 1991, the school's founding head Margot Tønseth was awarded the Albert Einstein Academy Foundation Alfred Nobel Medal. (Note: The Albert Einstein International Academy Foundation was founded in 1965 and ceased to exist in 1998.)

In 2008 the Year 9 students scored highest in the country on their national tests, according to Norwegian newspaper VG.

In 2009 the entire middle school, Years 9-11, scored the highest in the English national tests for their respective peer groups, according to VG.

== See also ==
- List of international schools
