= St. Peter's School, Barcelona =

St Peter's School
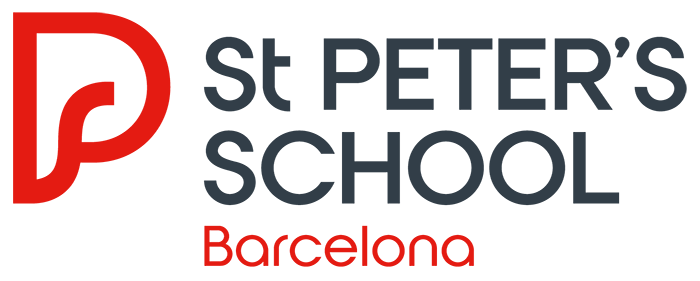

Location
- Carrer Eduard Toldrà 18, 08034, Barcelona, Spain; Spain; 41.3889°N 2.1058°E

Information
- Type: International school
- Motto: A step beyond
- Established: 1964
- Principal: Jordi Ginjaume
- Grades: Nursery (1 year) to pre-university (18 years)
- Website: St. Peter's School

St. Peter's School is an international school located in Barcelona, Spain. It was founded in 1964 by Josep Maria Ginjaume i Mencerré, Mariano Garriga i Gimferrer, and Jaime Lerma i Macías.

== Overview ==
St. Peter's School offers the three programmes of the International Baccalaureate (IB): the Primary Years Programme (PYP), the Middle Years Programme (MYP), and the Diploma Programme (DP).

The school is accredited by the Spanish Ministry of Education, the Generalitat de Catalunya, and the International Baccalaureate. It is listed in the *Barcelona Welcome Guide* published by the Barcelona City Council (Ajuntament de Barcelona).

== School structure ==
- Nursery (1–2 years)
- Primary Years Programme (ages 3–9), including Foundation Years (3–5) and Primary (6–9)
- Middle Years Programme (ages 10–14)
- Pre-university education (ages 15–18), including the IB Diploma Programme

== Multilingual environment ==
English is the main language of instruction throughout the school. Spanish and Catalan are incorporated progressively during the school years, and French is introduced as an additional language in later stages. Other languages may be offered through extracurricular activities.

== History ==
St. Peter's School was founded in 1964 as a coeducational educational project. According to an article published by *La Vanguardia* on the occasion of its 60th anniversary, the school was among the early English-language schools established in Barcelona.

== IB results ==
According to publicly available data compiled by IB Schools, students completing the IB Diploma Programme at St. Peter's School have obtained average results comparable to other IB schools in Spain.

Students holding the IB Diploma may access Spanish universities through the official conversion and recognition process administered by the National University of Distance Education (UNED).
