= Bogaerts International School =

School in Brussels, Belgium

Location
- Brussels; Belgium
- Coordinates: 50°46′41″N 4°21′04″E

Information
- Type: Private school
- Established: 2011
- Principal: David Bogaerts
- Website: http://www.bischool.com/

Bogaerts International School (BIS) is an international K-12 school in the municipality of Uccle in Brussels, Belgium. The school, founded in 2011 by Yann Bogaerts, is located in an area classed as semi-urban, while the campus is in a wooded area. The school offers an education to both local Belgian and foreign families.

The school follows an international baccalaureate (IB) curriculum. The school offers a continuum of three programmes of education: the Primary Years Programme (PYP), Middle Years Programme (MYP) and Diploma Programme (DP).

== History ==
BIS got its first authorisation by the Belgian programme in 2012 to offer the IB Middle Years Program for Grades 6 to 10. The following year, BIS was authorized by the IB to offer the IB Diploma Program for grades Primary Years Programme 1 to Diploma Programme 2. In the year 2021, BIS was authorized by the IB to offer the Belgian programme for Grades Pre-primary up till year 5, thus becoming the only fully accredited IB school in Brussels.

== Campus ==
The school is situated on the Domaine Latour de Freins in Brussels. The building was designed by the architect Henri Maquet and inaugurated in the presence of King Leopold II in 1903. The W-shaped building are a Flemish neo-renaissance shape, typical for the period and features brick masonry with white and blue stone bonds, and a natural slated roofing. The property comprises a wooded park with a surface area of 62,800,000m2. The school consists of a large parking area, an outdoor tennis court, a backyard play area, an indoor gymnasium, boarding houses and a large indoor cafeteria.

== Academics ==
Currently, BIS is the only fully accredited IB world school in Brussels, offering a continuum of three programmes of education: IB Primary Years Programme (PYP), IB Middle Years Programme (MYP) and the IB Diploma Programme (DP). BIS also offers an early years programme which is a part of the PYP for children aged between 3 and 6 years.

Besides the IB programme the school also offers language courses from beginner to advanced levels for students in French and Spanish.

== Extra-curricular activities ==
BIS offers sports and extra-curricular activities including music, hip-hop dance, cooking, tennis, robotics, boxing and coding classes.
