= ISF Waterloo =

International school in Belgium

Coordinates: 50.735546°N 4.395026°E

ISF Waterloo (International School of Flanders) is an international school for young people aged 2 ½ to 18. It is a member of the European Council for International Schools. The campus is located south of Brussels right on the border between the communes of Sint-Genesius-Rode and Waterloo. It currently has over 200 students enrolled, from 49 different nationalities, meaning that classes are usually small (around 18 students) . Every one of the teachers is trained in English as an Additional Language. French is taught daily to every student.

In 2015, ISF Waterloo has become the first Google for Education School in Belgium. Students access the learning resources on the Google platform using Chromebooks, tablets, and also the Interactive Whiteboard which is installed in every classroom. The school follows the International Primary Curriculum in Primary School. The Middle and High School students take the Cambridge International examinations.

The school sits on the site of the former World International School, which provided an international education in English for pupils aged 2½ to 18. It closed in 2012.

In 2021, ISF Waterloo has gained accreditation from Council of International Schools, which took five years to achieve, and also from Council of British International Schools.

== General Facts ==
- ISF Waterloo was the first school in Belgium to use Google for Education.
- ISF Waterloo is also CIS and COBIS accredited.
- ISF also has a Daycare/Creche which is exposed to a Trilingual envinronment, with English, French and Dutch.
- ISF also offers English classes and workshops for parents
- All teachers are Google Certified Educators
- ISF also offers activities for every Secondary student on Monday
- Primary students also can enroll in During-Recess or After-School activities
