= Surabaya European School =

Coordinates: 7.293983°S 112.665755°E

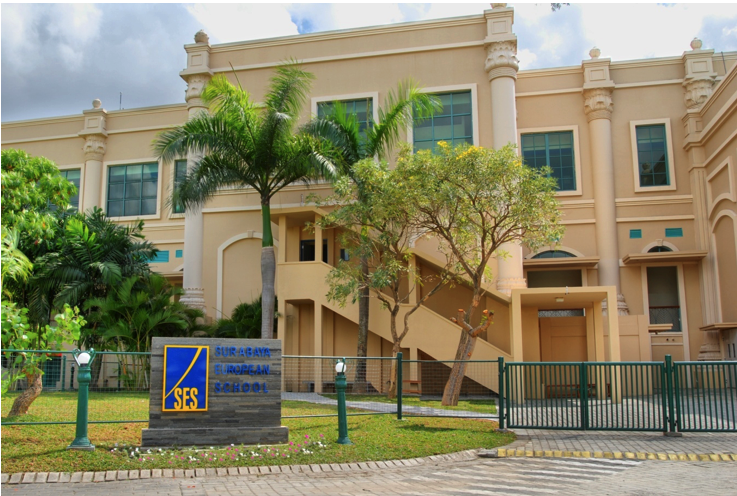
- Pakuwon Golf & Family Club Villa Bukit Regensi, Pakuwon Indah, Surabaya 60123; Indonesia

Information
- Type: Private, Day School
- Established: 1997
- Principal: Jill Robinson
- Grades: Montessori-Year 13
- Website: surabayaeuropeanschool.com

Surabaya European School (SES), Indonesia is a British international school that was established in 1997 as the first Montessori school in Surabaya with an AMI (Association Montessori International)-trained teacher. In 2001, in collaboration with the British International School Jakarta, the school grew to embrace the British National Curriculum. SES subsequently progressed to full Cambridge International Examinations accreditation in 2011 and administered its first on site Cambridge examinations in a newly constructed campus the same year. In 2015, SES adopted the International Primary Curriculum (IPC), to run in unison with the Cambridge International Curriculum, for students in year 2-6.

== SES School Vision ==
‘In a caring and supportive environment, our school community develops self-motivated learners with a global perspective so that they are empowered to create positive change in their world and beyond’.

== Curriculum ==
SES offers Montessori education for students from ages 3–6, the International Primary Curriculum (IPC) and Cambridge International Examinations (CIE) for the primary school, and the Cambridge International Curriculum for Key Stage 3 and IGCSE, AS and A Level education for secondary school students. SES is a registered Cambridge International Examinations School and Examination Centre

SES is registered with the Indonesia Ministry of Education as Satuan Pendidikan Kerjasama (SPK/ a school with international cooperation). It is in line with the MoE rule number 31/2014.

== Facilities ==
The campus has a gymnasium, swimming pool, dance studio, table tennis, science laboratory, primary and secondary computer laboratories, football field, tennis courts and play areas.

== Activities ==
An after school activities programme is offered from Year 2 onwards. The programme includes activities covering sports, arts (music, drama, visual art), leadership, clubs and special interests.

Sports available vary from term to term some of the most prevalent ones include athletics, badminton, basketball, cricket, football, gymnastics, hockey, swimming, tennis, touch rugby and ultimate frisbee.

Students participate in the International Award (Duke of Edinburgh) program and have gone on expeditions in various parts of Indonesia and Thailand. SES is a licensed Independent Award Centres (IACs) by the International Award organization.

Many secondary students take part in MUN (Model United Nations) program. Past conferences have included travel to Malang and Bandung in Indonesia and to Doha, Qatar for the THIMUN Conference. The Hague International Model United Nations.

All students participate in community service. Current projects include supporting the Yayasan Abdi Asih HIV Shelter in Surabaya and children with leukaemia at Dr Soetomo Hospital through education.

In 2015, SES secondary students constructed a recreation room in a joint venture with Somerset Hotel & Serviced Residence at Zoe’s Kindergarten. The building is dedicated in memory of Zoe Choi Man Suen, who was a member of the Surabaya European School community who died in December 2014.

== Houses ==
The school has a house system that is used for both sporting and academic purposes. The four school houses are Sura, Baya, Garuda and Komodo. Students are placed in these houses when they start school at SES.

Surabaya (Suroboyo) is locally believed to have derived its name from ‘suro’ (shark) and ‘boyo’ (crocodile). According to a local myth, these animals fought to be known as the most powerful and strongest animal in the area.

Sura (Blue) is represented by a shark Baya (Green) is represented by a crocodile Garuda (Yellow) is represented by the legendary bird-like creature Komodo (Red) is represented by a Komodo dragon (large monitor lizard)
