= FOSCO International School =

Location
- Coordinates: 10.77755°N 106.68807°E

Information
- Established: 1997
- Grades: Nursery - Grade 5
- Age: 18 months to 11
- Website: https://en.fis.edu.vn/

FOSCO International School (FIS) is an international school located in District 3 of Ho Chi Minh City, Vietnam. It is under the control of FOSCO, whose main purpose is that of a service company to foreign missions.

== History ==
The school was founded in 1997.

== Structure ==
FIS operates using the American-based curriculum and its core standards for students ranging from 18 months (nursery school) to 11 years of age (Grade 5). The regular school year runs from mid-August to mid-September, and summer school July to August.
