= International School of Hellerup =

School in Copenhagen, Denmark

Coordinates: 55°43′21″N 12°33′38″E

The International School of Hellerup, formerly Østerbro International School, is an IB World School, offering the IB Primary Years Programme, IB Middle Years Programme, and IB Diploma Programs. It is located on Rygårds Allé 131, in Hellerup, Copenhagen and Præstogade 17, in Østerbro, Copenhagen. It was previously located in the Østerbro district of Copenhagen, Denmark.

It has over 700 students from Pre-kindergarten to DP2 (also known as 12th grade).
