= Établissement Français d'Enseignement Montaigne =

Coordinates: 6.3520°N 2.3946°E

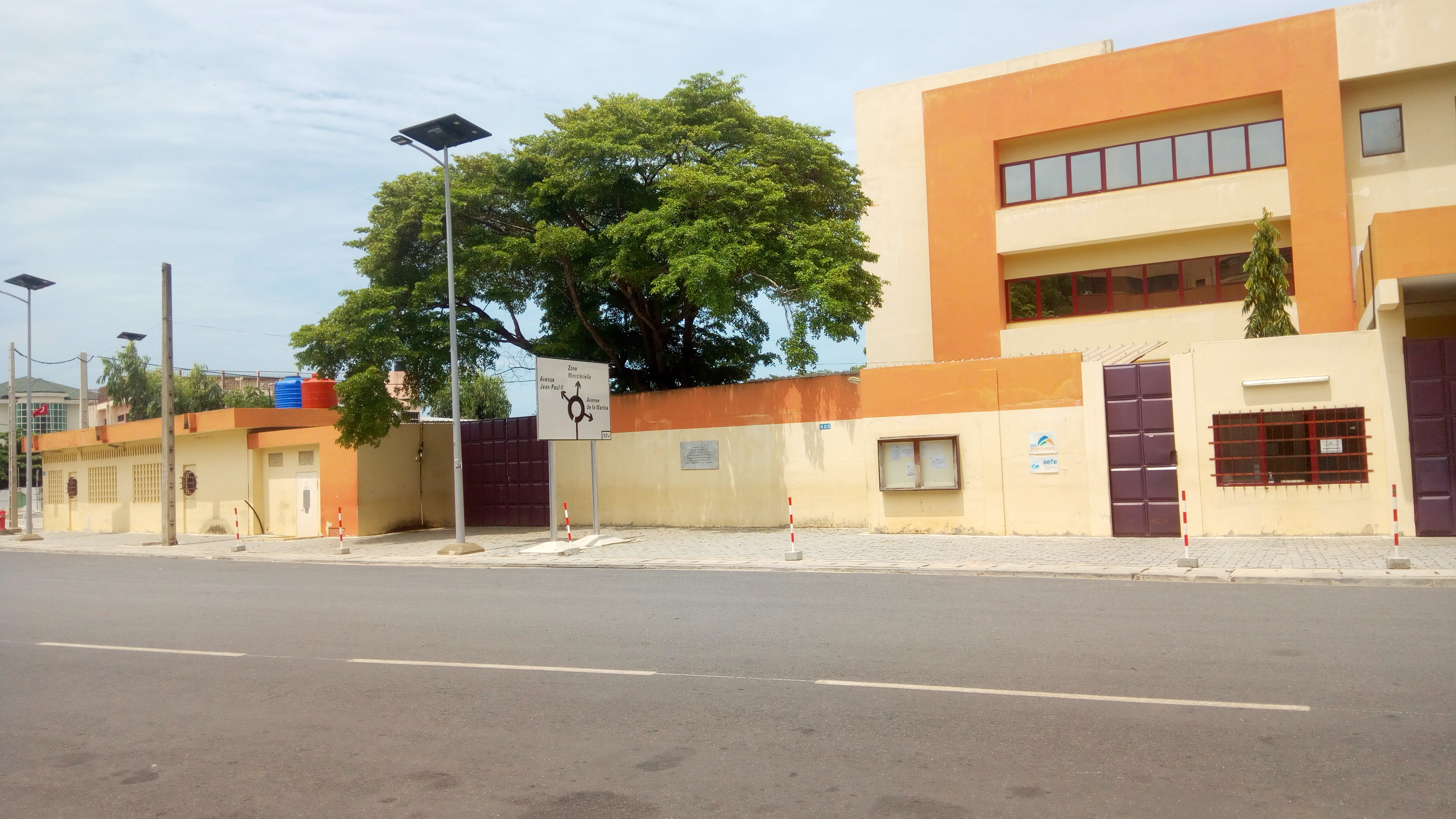
- Cotonou; Benin

Information
- Established: 1951
- Principal: M.Legendre
- Language: French

The Établissement Français d'Enseignement Montaigne (EFE Montaigne), or the École Montaigne, is a French international school in Cotonou, Benin. It has the levels primaire (primary) through lycée (senior high school).

Its origins stretch to 1951, when the cours Montaigne was created. The school in its present form opened in 1984.
