= British International School of Zagreb =

School following British education system in Zagreb, Croatia

Coordinates: 45.8428894°N 15.9443013°E

- Zagreb; Croatia

Information
- School type: International Boarding School
- Motto: sapentia et potentia (Wisdom and Power)
- Established: 2013
- Principal: Dr Martin-Tino Časl
- Age: 3 to 18

The British International School of Zagreb (BISZ) is a British international school in Zagreb, Croatia. It is a sister institution of the Kreativan razvoj Primary School.

== History ==
The school opened on 2 September 2013.

== Structure ==
The school takes students from Nursery to Year 13. Students can board from the age of 13.
