= Danila Kumar International School =

Coordinates: 46°5′13.7″N 14°30′38.7″E

Address
- Gogalova ulica 15, 1000 Ljubljana

Information
- Established: 1993
- Principal: Klemen Strmljan
- Age range: 3–15
- Website: http://en.os-danilekumar.si/

Danila Kumar International School is a public school in Slovenia that caters to students from over 40 nationalities, ranging from 3 to 15 years of age. It was established in 1993, and it has been an International Baccalaureate school since March 2, 1994. The school is named after the communist political commissar Danila Kumar (1921–1944).

== Location ==
Danila Kumar International School is located in Ljubljana's Bežigrad District in the premises of Danila Kumar Primary School (Slovene: Osnovna šola Danile Kumar). It is surrounded by residential housing. Beyond the housing, fields and the Kleče Pumping Station (Slovene: Vodarna Kleče) lie to the west, and to the east are more fields and the Sava River. The H3 expressway runs south of the neighborhood.
