= American International School in Cyprus =

American International School in Cyprus (AISC)
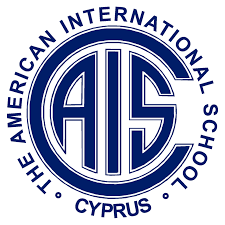

Location
- 11 Kassos St. Nicosia, Cyprus; 35.15907°N 33.3568°E

Information
- Type: Private
- Motto: Inspiring Students to Become Lifelong Learners
- Established: 1987
- Director: Dr. Misha Simmons
- Grades: K–12
- Colors: navy blue and white
- Website: www.aisc.ac.cy
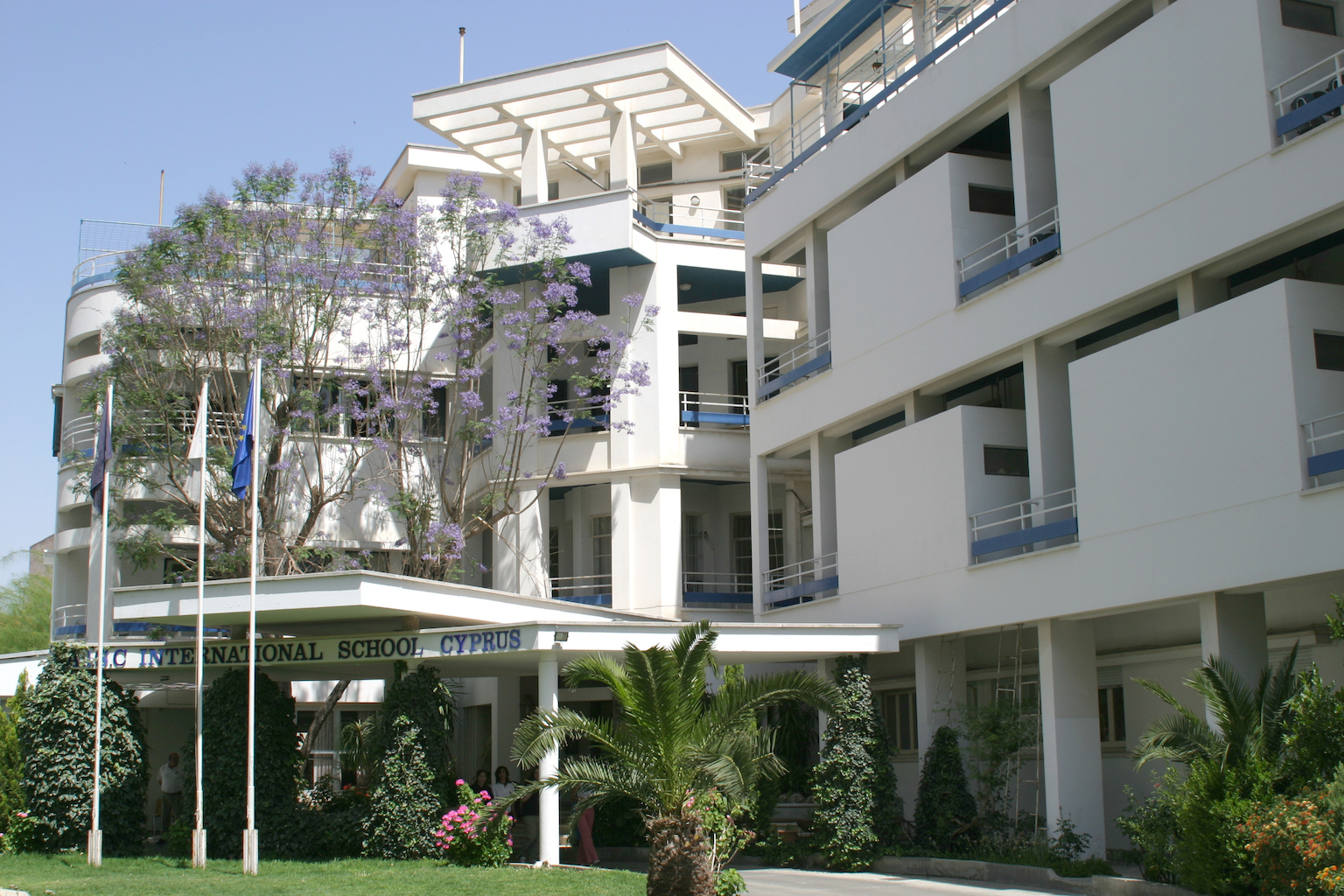
- Main school building entrance, 2004

American International School in Cyprus (AISC) is a private coeducational school in Nicosia, Cyprus. It offers an American and international university preparatory education, including the option of the International Baccalaureate program for the last two years of secondary school. AISC is owned by Esol Education.

== History ==
The building that currently houses AISC was originally constructed in 1950 and housed the St. Barbara's Polyclinic. In 1964, the clinic was converted into the Hill Hotel, and three floors were constructed. After the Hill Hotel closed in 1983, the school was founded in 1987 as the International School in Cyprus (ISC) and was later purchased in 1993 by its current owner Esol Education and changed the name to American International School in Cyprus. In 1994, the IB Diploma Programme was added to the 11th and 12th grade curriculum. In 2014 the Cyprus Minister of Education prohibited AISC from charging a €750 building development fee.

The school reopened in 1987 at the request of the American Embassy in Nicosia, with 51 students from kindergarten to Grade 12. When Esol Education bought it in 1993, it kept renting the same premises. It now serves students aged 3 to 18. Many are children of diplomats, international company employees and UN staff, alongside local families, and the school says it has about 400 registered students from over 40 nationalities.

In Grades 11 and 12, many students take the IB Diploma Programme alongside the American high school diploma. The school describes itself as the only one in Cyprus with an American-accredited programme, and its programme is approved by the Cyprus Ministry of Education. Beyond sports courts and a pool, the campus has science and IT laboratories and spaces for arts and performances. Students can join after-school activities, service-learning projects and field trips in Cyprus and abroad.

== Accreditation ==
AISC is accredited by the Middle States Association of Colleges and Schools (MSA) and Council of International Schools (CIS)

== Partnership ==
In April 2016, AISC and its parent organization, Esol Education, entered into an MOU with Stanford Pre-collegiate International Institutes, to send students from Cyprus to Stanford, California. The program allows students to experience college life at Stanford University, ranked in 2016 as #4 in the world by US News "Best Global University Ranking." The two-week residential program includes courses such as sciences and engineering, writing and humanities, covering concepts such as creativity, leadership, design-thinking, problem-solving, and communication, as well as field trips and excursions to other colleges and landmarks nearby. Students from 14 to 17 years may apply for the program and will be selected based on academic merit.
