= British School of Ulaanbaatar =

Private school in Khan Uul, Ulaanbaatar, Mongolia

Coordinates: 47°52′27.9″N 106°50′50.6″E

- Ulaanbaatar; Mongolia

Information
- Type: Private day school
- Motto: "An education for the world"
- Established: 2010
- Headmaster: Mark Reed
- Staff: 152
- Gender: Mixed
- Age: 3 to 18
- Enrolment: 601 (approx.)
- Houses: St.David; St.George; St.Andrew; St.Patrick
- Colours: Purple and Gold
- Website: britishschool.edu.mn

The British School of Ulaanbaatar (BSU) is a private international day school founded in 2010 and is located in Khan Uul Disttrict, Ulaanbaatar, Mongolia. The School offers an educational programme based on the National Curriculum of England and Wales and prepares students to sit the IGCSE and A-Level qualifications provided by Cambridge Assessment International Examinations (CAIE). After graduation, most of the students attend universities in North America, Europe and Australia. BSU is a Patron's Accredited member of COBIS, a member of the Council of International Schools (CIS) and accredited by British Schools Overseas (BSO).

== Curriculum ==
BSU offers an academic programme that prepares students to sit IGCSE and A-Level qualifications, provided by CAIE, at 16 and 18, respectively. Additionally, the Mongolian Diploma programme is also offered as an option to students in Years 12 and 13 who wish to gain entrance to universities in Mongolia. Academic subjects taught at the School are English (Literature and Language), Mathematics, Biology, Chemistry, Physics, History, Geography, Economics, Business Studies, Art, Design, Physical Education, PSHE, Global Perspective, Music, Mandarin Chinese, Mongolian Language and Mongolian History and Culture. All lessons are taught in English except for modern languages and the Mongolian History and Culture classes. English as an Additional Language (EAL) is provided for students who require support to develop their fluency in English, as are sessions for students with identified specific educational needs.

== Composition and Operations ==
Classes are provided for students from three to eighteen years of age and the School admits students of all nationalities who wish to study an international British curriculum in the medium of English. The School has grown from 190 students in 2012 to over 600 by 2023. Class sizes are limited to no more than twenty-four students, and the majority of the teachers are British. The School has four day Houses named after the patron saints of the British Isles (St. George, St. Andrew, St. David and St. Patrick). Every student is a member of one of the Houses. The school day runs from 8:00 to 16:00 on Tuesday, Wednesday, and Thursday, while on Monday and Friday, it ends at 15:00. Each day begins with registration or assembly at the start of the day followed by lessons that begin at 8:30 on Tuesday, Wednesday, and Thursday, and at 8:10 on Monday and Friday. Lessons on Tuesday, Wednesday, and Thursday are split into periods of one hour, on Monday and Friday, lessons are 55 minutes long. A range of optional extra-curricular activities (ECAs) are also offered each afternoon, providing students to participate in academic groups, preparation programmes for national and international competitions, creative and performing arts clubs and team sports.

== Scandals ==
On 23 February 2019, a scandal broke out and hooded men burst into the "British School of Ulaanbaatar" and bombarded the school, attacking staff, stealing computer parts and finance papers. In the scandal, the 49% shareholders of the school, Bayar-uchral, Amraa and Ariunaa were fired from the school by the 51% shareholder, Oyuungerel. Within a month, they had stolen students' tuition through their own bank accounts, therefore hiring masked men to break into the school to steal finance papers, computer CPUs, hard drives, and large amounts of cash, causing dozens of foreign teachers to leave the school and Mongolia completely.
