= Tangier Anglo-Moroccan School =

Coordinates: 35°44′15.27″N 5°52′21.15″W

Anglo-Moroccan School
- Tangier; Morocco

Information
- Type: Private
- Motto: "We are preparing for future life"
- Established: 2008
- Gender: Co-educational
- Website: Official website

Construction of the Anglo-Moroccan School (AMS) in Tangier, Morocco was completed in August 2008.

The AMS project created by Russell Edwards was started in 2005 with substantial assistance from the Moroccan authorities. The aim was to create a modern international style school that would help Tangier by providing education for the growing number of children of foreign nationals and Moroccan expatriates living in Tangier. The school, located in the city suburb of Ziaten, offers primary and secondary British international education to children and young people whatever their nationality.

Building began in July 2007, and the school received its first group of students in the September 2008. The Anglo-Moroccan School is licensed by the University of Cambridge as an International Examinations Centre (MA008) and a registered Cambridge International Primary Programme school.

In the Spring of 2009, the Anglo-Moroccan School was honoured to receive a visit from a member of the Moroccan Royal Family, Cherifa Lalla Oum Keltoum.

== Studies ==
Students are prepared for the Cambridge Primary Achievement Award, Cambridge Checkpoint, IGCSE, A Level and the CIE English Language qualifications such YLEs, KET, PET and FCE. The teaching of Arabic and French languages is offered as a part of the programme.
