= International School of the Gothenburg Region =

School in Gothenburg, Sweden

Coordinates: 57.69452°N 11.97431°E

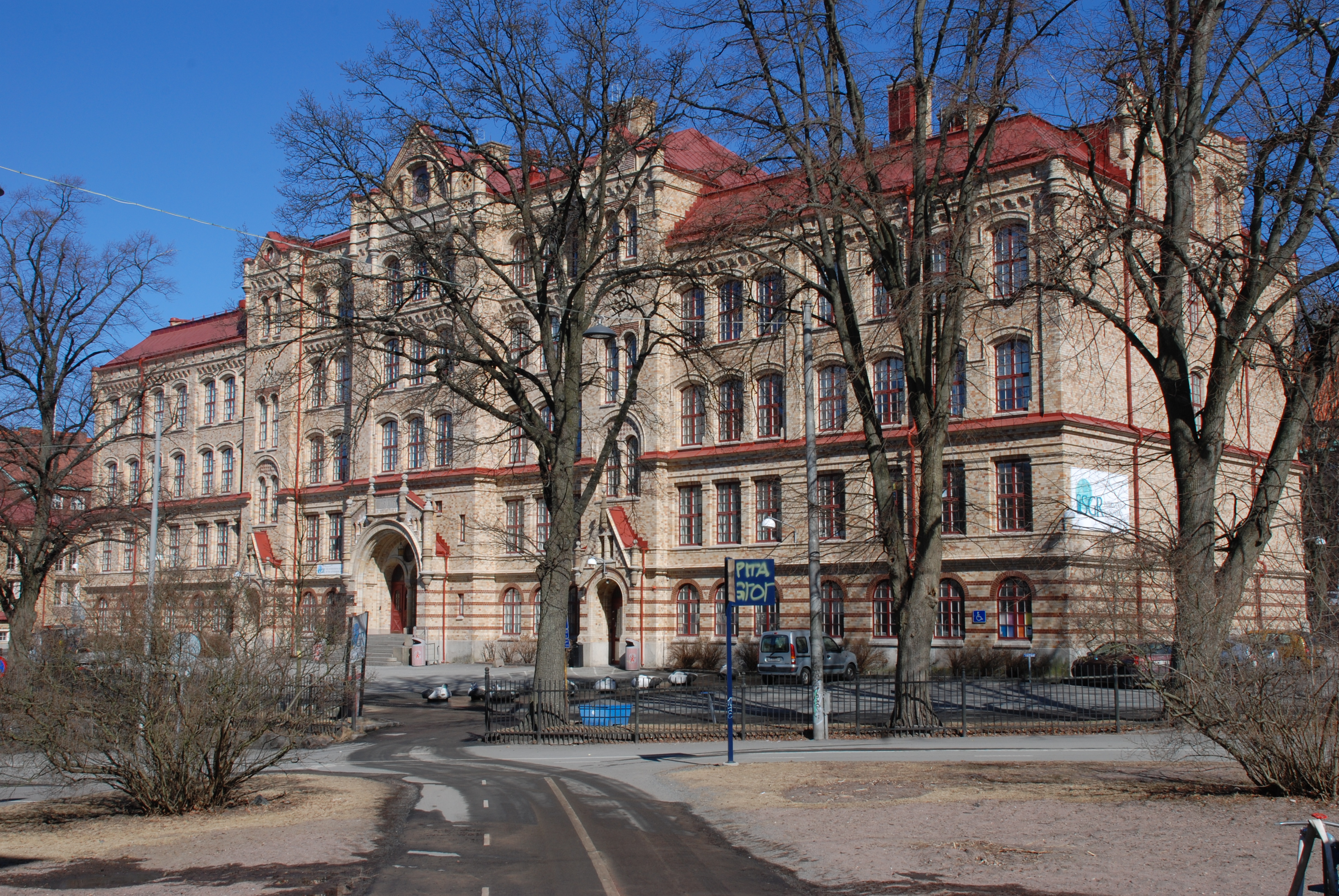

Location
- Guldhedsgatan 6 Gothenburg; Västra Götaland; Sweden

Information
- Type: International Baccalaureate school
- Motto: "Embrace diversity explore the world"
- Established: 1997
- Founder: The Gothenburg region Association of Local authorities (GR)
- Principal: Patrick MacAulay, Lee Brown and Corinna Ljungberg
- Head of school: Annika Simonsson Bergqvist
- Teaching staff: 90
- Grades: F-5
- Enrollment: ~1000
- Language: English, Swedish
- Website: ISGR website

The International School of the Gothenburg Region (ISGR AB) is an international school in Gothenburg, Sweden fully owned and founded by GR, the Gothenburg Region Association of Local Authorities. The school offers the International Baccalaureate (IB) and the Swedish National Programme for grades F-9. The school has been an IB World School since August 2000, and CIS-accredited as of March 2008.

The school consists of two campuses. Guldheden Campus for grades 0-5 is located at Guldhedsgatan while the Götaberg Campus for grades 6-10 is located on Molinsgatan, in metropolitan Gothenburg. Both campuses are connected to the transport System of Gothenburg; the Guldheden Campus is located at the tram stop "Kapellplatsen" while the Götaberg Campus is located at "Wavrinskys Plats", which is only two stops away from the other campus. The gym is located on the South Campus.

The Head of school is Annika Simonsson Bergqvist.

Currently, 90 teachers work at ISGR and teach over 1000 students who are from 65 different countries.

== The National Programme LGR M & P ==
The National Programme at ISGR offers a Swedish education for grades 0 - 9 students. As in the International Programme, all the grade 0 - 6 students are situated at the Guldheden Campus, and all grade 7 - 9 students are situated at the Götaberg Campus. Admission priority is given to residents living in central Gothenburg, Majorna, Linné and Örgryte.

== The International Programme MYP & PYP ==
The International programme begins from PYP 0 up to MYP 5. The PYP section is located on the Guldheden Campus, and the MYP programme is located on the Götaberg Campus. Priority is given to students from outside or who have lived outside Sweden.

== School fees and government subsidy ==
All of the school's stocks are owned by the Gothenburg Region Association of Local Authorities. Due to the increased costs and limited government subsidy from the school offering the international programme, the school has to charge school fees to all international students in the International Section (except for year 10 students).

The student's municipality that they are registered as living in pays a subsidy for their student. The students of the school are often the offspring of people working for multi-national companies, most commonly Volvo, SKF, and AstraZeneca.
