= International School Twente =

Location
- Tiemeister 20, 7541 WG; Twente; Enschede, Overijssel; Netherlands
- Coordinates: 52.2025°N 6.8979°E

Information
- School type: Public with private funding, Cambridge school(secondary), IPC school(primary)
- Grades: Grade 1 to 13
- Years offered: 4-19
- Gender: Mixed
- Website: https://internationalschooltwente.nl/

The International School Twente (ISTwente ) is an English-teaching international school located in Enschede, Overijssel in the Netherlands. It is composed of a primary division and a secondary division. Both divisions teach all classes in English(except for some language classes). The primary division has classes from grade 1-6 while the secondary division offers grade 7 -13. Both divisions work in close cooperation but are yet to be fully integrated.

== History ==
The primary division of ISTwente opened its doors on August 25, 2008. The secondary division opened officially on January 13, 2012 by the Right Honourable Mrs Ank Bijleveld, the Queen's Commissioner for the province of Overijssel. After several years of development, it grew to a school with over 100 students from more than 40 nationalities.

== Facilities ==
The secondary division of ISTwente locates inside the Zuid campus of Het Stedelijk Lyceum. It has its own department within the campus while sharing the fully equipped gyms, sports field, science labs, and art & music department. A canteen is in service for ISTwente and a carpark belonging to the Zuid campus is located in front of the school.

The primary division of ISTwente is located separately in its own building in Johannes ter Horststraat.

== Curricula ==
The secondary department of ISTwente currently offers a Cambridge Secondary curriculum to students from 11/12-18/19, including Cambridge Secondary 1 (with Checkpoint), Cambridge IGCSE, Cambridge International AS and A-Level, and Cambridge Pre-U. A gradual transition from CIE A-Levels to the IB Diploma Programme is in progress. At this moment subjects offered include:

ISTwente's primary curriculum is based on the National Curriculum for England (NCE), and International Primary Curriculum (IPC). In July 2016, the school received its IPC accreditation, making it the third fully accredited IPC school in The Netherlands.
