= International School of Macaé =

Location
- R. João Batista da Silva Lessa, 275 - Glória; Macaé - RJ, 27933-160; Brazil
- 22°23′59″S 41°48′6″W

Information
- Type: Second Language Learning School
- Established: 2005
- Faculty: 9 faculty members and 7 teaching assistants
- Grades: Nursery through 9th Year
- Enrollment: 156
- Campus size: 2 acres (8,100 m^{2})
- Campus type: Suburban
- Colors: Red, blue and yellow
- Slogan: Inglês da melhor maneira!
- Sports: Futsal, Volleyball, and Judo
- Website: www.isom.net

The International School of Macaé (ISoM) is a language school located in Macaé, Brazil. The school was founded in 2005, offering Macaé's first English language immersion program, and previously also included a curriculum program for expat students in the region.

== Curriculum ==
International School of Macaé offers an intensive English Immersion Program for Brazilian national students ages 3 to 16. EIP Students spend a minimum of 2 hours a day, five days a week, in an English-only environment. Based on assessment, students are placed in one of five proficiency levels, from beginner level to advanced. The school recognizes that much of language learning comes from living and experiencing it in normal, structured, and unstructured activities. Structured language constructs are taught once a natural acquisition of spoken English has developed. However, when students are ready, teachers introduce active, direct, and explicit instructional methods which give students abundant opportunities to learn and produce new and more complex English language structures. The goal of the program is that students graduate with true bilingual language skills, readily comfortable working and speaking in both English and Portuguese.

== Facilities ==
The School's facilities include climatized classrooms, an English-language library, a theatre studio, IT lab, pool, student garden and play yard, an early childhood playlot, a cafeteria with full-service lunch and snack options, and two sports courts offering extracurricular activities including futsal, volleyball and judo.
