= ABC International School =

The ABC International School

Location
- Ho Chi Minh City, Viet Nam; 10.734067°N 106.691683°E

Information
- Established: 1995
- Principal: Steven Shaw
- Age: 2 to 19
- Enrollment: 800
- Academic Staff: 80
- Type: International, Private
- Inspection Rating: Outstanding in all areas (Grade 1), October 2017
- Website: www.theabcis.com

The ABC International School (ABCIS), Ho Chi Minh City is an international school in Ho Chi Minh City, Vietnam, offering both a English and International curriculum education. The school is co-educational and non-denominational. It comprises three campuses in Ho Chi Minh City (Saigon), both in the Binh Chanh residential area in the south. Students at the ABC International School follow the National Curriculum for England (and Wales) from age 2 to 14 (Nursery to Year 9) and IGCSE (International General Certificate of Secondary Education) and A-level examinations from Years 10–13. All students graduate from university and most attend top universities in the US, United Kingdom, Australia, and Canada, many receiving academic scholarships. The school is a registered center for the UK and many different international examination boards. 37 nationalities are represented among the student body.

== History ==
The ABC International School was founded in 1995 with an enrollment of 7 students of nursery age. Centered initially on a small site in District 3, the school rapidly expanded and by 2006 this expansion necessitated the movement to a new, larger campus in Binh Chanh District. The school grew over time from a Nursery to a Primary and then a Primary and Secondary school; the first IGCSE examination cohort sat exams in 2007. The school, already registered with the Department for Education in the UK and with the Cambridge International Examination Board, began to branch out and join other bodies such as FOBISIA (Federation of British International Schools in Asia) and COBIS (The Council of British International Schools). The scope of examinations and opportunities available to the students increased as the school grew.
