= École française de Bratislava =

Coordinates: 48°07′11.4″N 17°07′55.2″E

École française de Bratislava Slovak: Francúzska škola v Bratislave
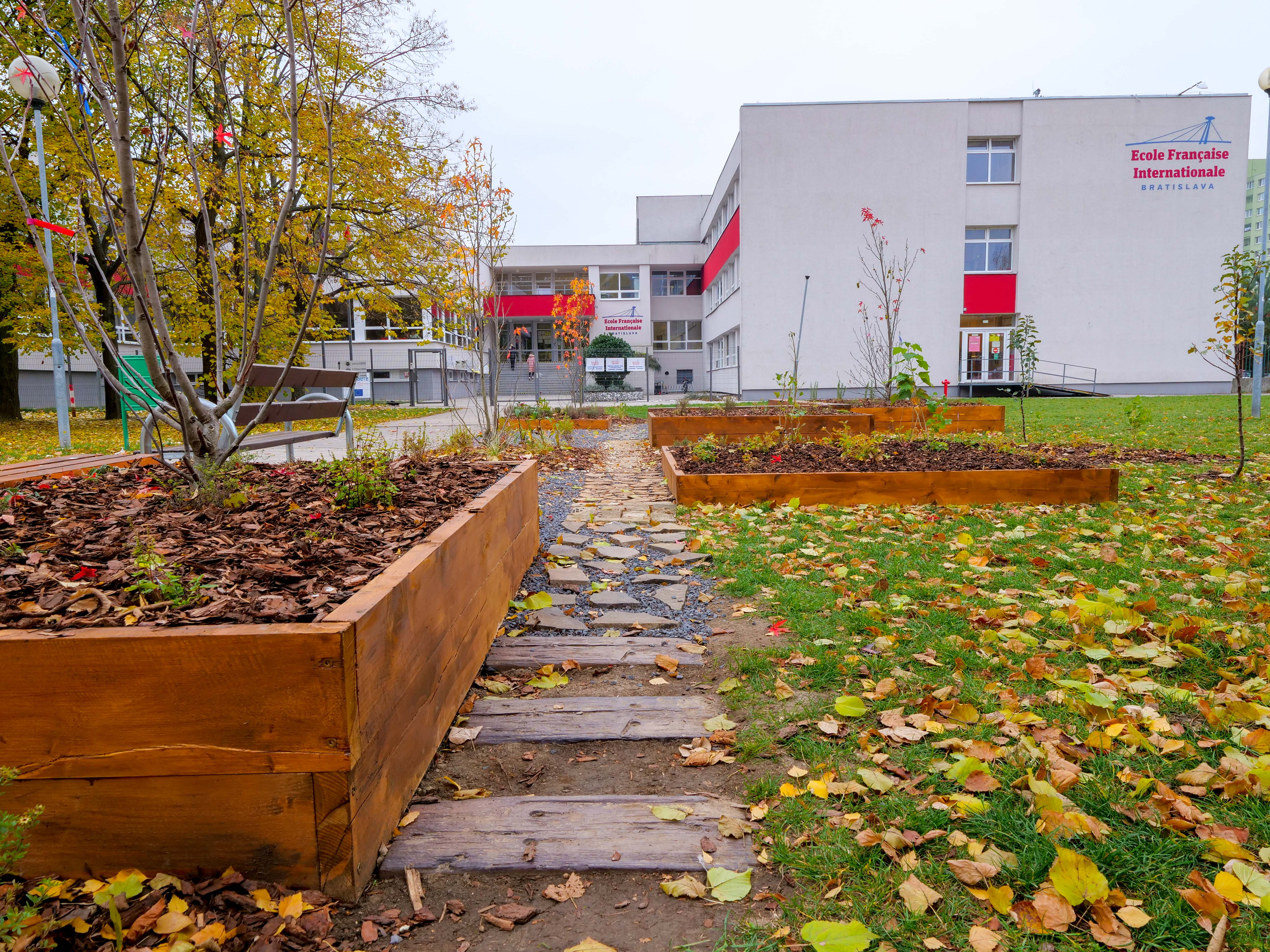

Information
- Established: 2003
- Age: 2 to 18
- Language: French; Slovak
- Website: https://ecolefrancaise.sk/

École Française de Bratislava (Slovak: Súkromná základná škola francúzsko-slovenská v Bratislave or Francúzska škola v Bratislave) is a French international school in Bratislava, Slovakia.

== Structure ==
The school serves maternelle (Kindergarten), élémentaire (Elementary), collège (Middle school) and lycée (High school) levels, from 2 to 18 years old (meaning from Kindergarten to High school).

The school teaches five languages: French and Slovak from the age of two and English from the age of five, with the opportunity learn Spanish and German in collège and lycée.

== History ==
The school was founded in 2003 with eight students.

In 2007, a middle school section was opened with the support of the CNED.

In 2014, the school relocated to new premises in Petržalka.

A high school section was opened in 2017.
