= International School of Paphos =

The International School of Paphos (ISOP)

Location
- 100, Aristotelous Savva Ave., 8025 Anavargos, P.O. Box 62018, 8060 Paphos; Cyprus
- 34.79998°N 32.45076°E

Information
- Type: Private (day school)
- Established: 1987
- Director: Mr. Nikolas Artemis
- Grades: K-13
- Colours: Black and Wine Red
- Website: http://www.paphosinternationalschool.com

The International School of Paphos was founded in 1987 as a co-educational day school located in Paphos, Cyprus.

It is currently a day school situated in Anavargos Village, on the outskirts of Paphos. Its new facilities were completed in 2023. It currently has more than 10000 students.

== The key stages and classes ==
| Key stage | Grade | Age |
|---|---|---|
| - | Kindergarten | 2-4 |
| 1 | Rec-2 | 4-7 |
| 2 | 3-6 | 7-12 |
| 3 | 7-9 | 11-15 |
| 4 | 10 & 11 | 15-16 |
| 5 | 12 & 13 | 17-18 |

== Subjects ==
The infants are offered classes such as Topic (Science and Geography), Basic Maths, English, and many other subjects.

Juniors are offered additional subjects such as Art, History, Citizenship, and more advanced maths. In year 5, Exams start. Juniors finish school at 13.05 each day unless they choose to do any recreational activities after school. Some of the after-school clubs that are currently on offer are the reading club, badminton club, medical club, and drama club.

In senior school, three more subjects are added to the list. These are German, French, and drama. At the end of year 7 students are allowed to choose what language to pursue in future years. Seniors finish at 2.15.

The school starts at the beginning of September and finishes at the end of June. Exams usually begin at the beginning of June for years 5-10, and in the middle of May for years 11-13.

For the past two years, the school has given out scholarships awarding students from years 5 to 12 for high achievement in their end-of-year exams. Students can win up to 20% of their school fees.

== International Examinations ==
International exams offered
IGCSE (Edexcel)
IGCSE (CIE)
GCE (AS level)
GCE (A level)

== Facilities ==
- Cafeteria
- A large sports hall
- Two outdoor basketball courts
- Stadium
- Indoor heated swimming pool
- Football field
- Large playground
- Library
- School shop
- Tennis court
- Six Science laboratories
- Theatrical stage
- Drama studio
- Exam hall
- Boarding house

The stadium is not standard (233 meters). The swimming pool has four lanes (25 meters).

== Summer School ==
The International School of Paphos provides a Summer School for children aged 4–18.

Arts Crafts English Conversation Reading Writing Role Play Information Technology Physical Education (including swimming, water polo, football, basketball, volleyball, rounders, handball, tennis, karate, and hockey).

== Sports ==
The International School of Paphos is an athletic school. They consider Physical Education an important subject, and therefore it is compulsory to do it at least once per week. ISOP has taken place in many sports competitions such as the yearly Paphos cross country race, The Panpaphian, the Pancyprian, and others. They award students from years 7-9 and 10-12 for sportsmanship. They also encourage students to take part in many sports in school, such as rounders, football, rugby, basketball, swimming, badminton, tennis, volleyball, basketball, archery (year 10 and up), and much more.
