= Global Christian Foreign School =

Private school in Seoul, South Korea

Global Christian Foreign School (지구촌기독외국인학교)

Location
- 4-22 Hannam-dong, Yongsan-gu; Seoul, Hannam-dong, Yongsan District; South Korea

Information
- Type: Independent, college preparatory school
- Motto: "Raising up global Christian leaders"
- Established: 1996
- Founder: Joseph Song
- Faculty: 16
- Grades: Kindergarten - 12
- Colors: Blue and Yellow
- Mascot: Lion
- Accreditation: Korean Ministry of Education
- Gender: Coeducational
- Affiliations: College Board, Association of Christian Schools International, Council of International School Administration in Korea
- School Address: 4-22 Hannam-dong, Yongsan-gu, Seoul
- Website: http://www.gcfskorea.org/

Global Christian Foreign School (commonly GCFS, or Korean 지구촌기독외국인학교 and formerly Global Christian School) is a private, international K-12 school in Seoul, South Korea that was founded in 1996. It is affiliated with College Board, Association of Christian Schools International, and the Council of International School Administration in Korea. It is currently accredited by the Korean Ministry of Education. The school is currently located in the Yongsan District , specifically in Hannam-dong across from the Hannam The Hills apartment complex in the UN Village vicinity.

== History ==
Global Christian Foreign School was founded in 1996 by the deceased Rev. Joseph Song with only three students but soon grew to about 75. One of the older foreign schools, it was originally located in the Itaewon area but moved to the current location in Hannam-dong. The school has always had a student body from a variety of nations in enrollment.

== Academics ==
The current curriculum is focused on preparing students to attend American universities and is based on that of the Common Core State Standards Initiative. There is also an option for high school students to take AP Courses through Apex Learning. Grading is done on a 4.0 scale with a graduation requirement of 25 credits for college-preparatory students, which include a variety of electives. The school calendar is the same as that of most American high schools which begin in August and extend until June of the following year.

== Extracurricular activities ==
While GCFS does not currently have any organized athletic teams, it offers a variety of clubs and activities including:

- Missions Club
- Origami club
- Podcast club
- School Newspaper
- Sports Club
- Student Council
- Yearbook Club

== Events ==
Throughout the year the school holds a variety of class specific and school wide events.

- Innovation Day
- Field Day
- Science Fair
- Middle School & High School Retreat
- Elementary School VBS
- Scavenger Hunt

== Christian emphasis ==
GCFS takes measures to ensure that it maintains a faith community atmosphere while also providing the academic needs of the student body. As a result, the school holds a chapel service twice a week that the students and staff are required to attend. One of these chapels are usually school wide while the other consists of only the middle and high school grades. The principal usually serves additionally as the school chaplain. Also, each educator that is hired on by the administration considers themselves to be missionaries as well as teachers and agrees to maintain Christian principles while on staff. As a result of this, the students are not required to be Christian whereas the teachers of the school are.
