= Scuola Svizzera di Roma =

Location
- Via Marcello Malpighi 14; Rome, Italy; 41°54′35″N 12°30′23″E

Information
- Established: 1946
- Director: Marc König
- Website: www.ssroma.it

Scuola Svizzera di Roma (German: Schweizerschule Rom, translation: Swiss School of Rome) is a Swiss international school with a holistic pedagogy that leads to the Swiss Matura.

The high school offers two profiles, with students choosing between a major in economics and law, and a major in physics and applications of mathematics.

== History ==
The school was founded in 1946 by members of the Swiss community in Rome after the collapse of Italian fascism. It is currently one of 18 Swiss schools abroad that have joined the umbrella organization Educationsuisse. It is officially recognized both in Switzerland and in Italy.

The school is neutral from a political and religious point of view. The Federal Department of Home Affairs, through the Federal Office of Culture, exercises the financial supervision, while the Canton of St. Gallen, as patron canton, is responsible for the pedagogy and curricula. The association “Swiss School Rome” is the body that runs the school in the narrow sense of the term. Every three years, the members of the association elect a board of directors, which – together with the principal – is responsible for the strategic management of the school.

== Pedagogical principles ==
The Swiss School of Rome promotes the development of each student according to the Swiss pedagogical model and Johann Heinrich Pestalozzi’s basic concept. The school encourages adolescents to develop their own independence and a sense of responsibility.

The Swiss School Rome taught most subjects in German and according to the curricula of the Canton of St. Gallen. The school community has people from about 20 different nationalities.

== Teaching languages ==
From the kindergarten level on, the students are taught the German language, which is the main language in the following school levels. In primary school, in addition to the Swiss curricula, the children take the “esame di idoneità” at the end of primary school (esame di idoneità al termine del quinto anno di scuola primaria, ai fini dell'ammissione al successivo grado d'istruzione) and the “licenza media” (esame di Stato conclusivo del primo ciclo d’istruzione) at the end of middle school. From the third school year onwards, English is added as a third language.

In middle school, in the sixth school year, French is added as a fourth language, and in high school, from the ninth school year on, students can additionally take Latin as an elective.

== Alumni association ==
In 2021, in celebration of the 75th anniversary of the school, the Swiss School of Rome's alumni association was founded.
