= Yogyakarta Independent School =

Location
- Interactive map
- Jl. Tegal Mlati No. 1 Sinduadi, Mlati; Java; Sleman Regency, Special Region of Yogyakarta, 55284; Indonesia
- Coordinates: 7.7456°S 110.3672°E

Information
- School type: Private
- Established: c.1989
- Principal: Becky Gray BA(Hons) MA MA CMgr MCMI FCCT
- Gender: Male and female coeducational
- Age range: 3 to 18 years
- Enrollment: 85
- Language: English
- Website: www.yis-edu.org

Yogyakarta Independent School (YIS), also known as Yogyakarta International School, is a primary and secondary school in Yogyakarta, Indonesia. Founded in 1989, the school features international curriculums delivered by a team of international and national teachers. The YIS is accredited to teach the International Baccalaureate (IB) curriculum, and is an IB World School. The school population is around 100 students. The school is affiliated with the East Asia Regional Council of Overseas Schools (EARCOS).
