= Sarajevo International School =

QSI International School of Sarajevo

Location
- Alipašina 41, Sarajevo 71000, Bosnia & Herzegovina; Sarajevo; Bosnia and Herzegovina
- Coordinates: 43°51′43″N 18°24′40″E

Information
- Established: 1997
- Principal: Leah Jamele
- Age range: 3-18
- Enrollment: 170
- Mascot: Wolf
- Website: sarajevo.qsi.org

QSI International School of Sarajevo is an international school in Sarajevo, Bosnia and Herzegovina. The language of instruction is English. The curriculum is based on US National Standards with the addition of three foreign languages. The school is funded by tuition fees. Students range from 3 to 18 years of age. It has approximately 170 students, representing 37 nationalities. The school's director is Leah Jamele.

The school was located in Vogošća, a quiet suburb of Sarajevo. It recently changed location to a building closer to the city center.

Sarajevo International School is part of Quality Schools International and is accredited by the Middle States Association of Colleges and Schools. The school is also part of the Central and Eastern European Schools Association (CEESA).
