= Ressu Comprehensive School =

Helsinki city school in Kamppi

Coordinates: 60.1668°N 24.9245°E

Ressu Comprehensive School Finnish: Ressun peruskoulu
- Kamppi; Helsinki; Finland

Information
- Type: International school
- Established: 1891; 134 years ago
- Language: English, Finnish
- Website: www.hel.fi/en/childhood-and-education/ressu-comprehensive-school

Ressu Comprehensive School (Finnish: Ressun peruskoulu) is a Helsinki city school in Kamppi, Helsinki, Finland. There are currently 9 grades in the school, grades 1–6 following the PYP, 7–9 the MYP. The languages of instruction are Finnish and English, students enroll either in the Finnish or the English language of acquisition stream. The school's objective is to provide basic education for all Helsinki residents.

Currently, Ressu has approximately 750 students and 50 teachers.

== Curriculum ==
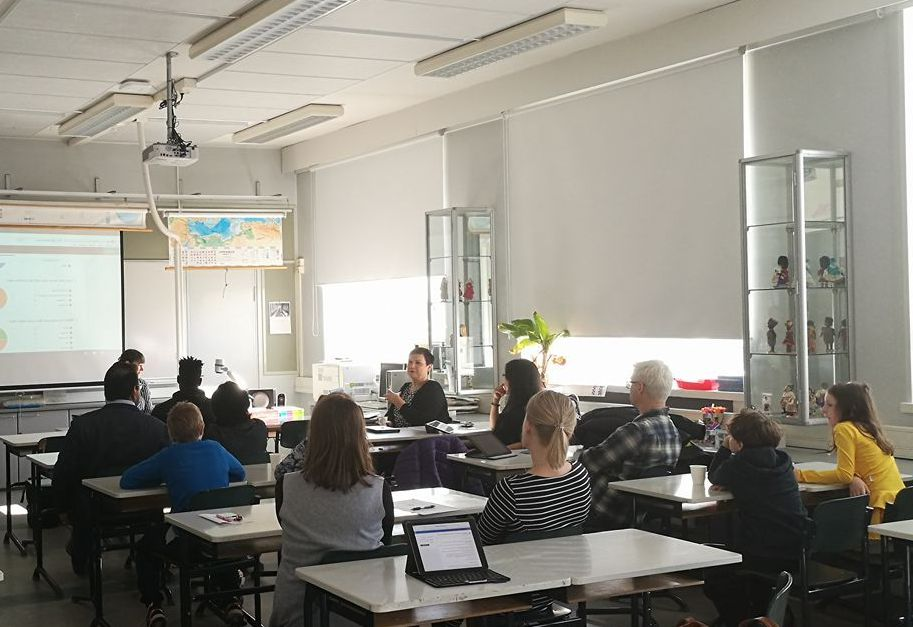
Inside the school

Ressu Comprehensive School

The school's curriculum is based on the Finnish national core curriculum and the frameworks provided by the International Baccalaureate Organization programmes (both IB Primary Years Programme, PYP, and IB Middle Years Programme, MYP).

In Finland, the comprehensive schools provide basic education for grades 1 to 9. Their objective is to provide each pupil with the opportunity for diverse learning, growth and development of healthy self-esteem. All comprehensive schools aim to provide good basic skills and knowledge and sufficient all-round learning. Ressu Comprehensive School is a city school and is managed by the City of Helsinki.

== History ==
The school was originally established in 1891. The current school building was built in 1939, and renovated in 1994–1996, 2006 and 2011–2012.

During World War I, the school building served as a military hospital.

== Notable people ==
- Ana Diamond
