= Benjamin Franklin International School =

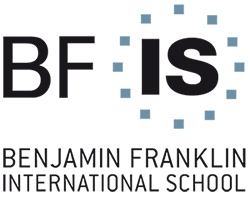

Location
- Martorell i Peña 9, Barcelona, Catalonia; Spain
- Coordinates: 41.406042°N 2.11922°E

Information
- Type: Private School
- Established: 1986
- Head of school: Lila Jorge
- Grades: Nursery - Grade 12
- Enrollment: 720
- Head of Elementary: Tara Zielinski
- Head of Secondary: Damon McCord
- IB Coordinator: Michal Valente
- Website: Benjamin Franklin International School Website

Benjamin Franklin International School is an International American school located in Barcelona that provides education from Nursery (3 years old) to Grade 12 (18 years old) to approximately 695 students from over 52 different nationalities. The school is a private, non-profit, co-educational day school with three divisions: Elementary School, Middle School and High School. BFIS offers three diploma programs: American High School Diploma, Spanish Baccalaureate Diploma and International Baccalaureate Diploma (IB Diploma).

BFIS is accredited by the Middle States Association of Colleges and Schools and the International Baccalaureate, and it is recognized in Spain as a Foreign School by the Generalitat de Catalunya and the Spanish Ministry of Education. BFIS is also a member of BISA (Barcelona International Schools Association)

== History ==
BFIS was founded in 1986 by a group of Barcelona parents. The school opened with 150 students and 23 teachers and it was located in Avinguda Pearson (Barcelona). BFIS moved to current address in Martorell i Peña (Barcelona) in 1991. The current building has historic significance, having been used during the Spanish Civil War to treat patients, among them English writer George Orwell.

== Divisions ==
- Early Childhood: Nursery and Pre-Kindergarten
- Elementary School: Kindergarten to Grade 5
- Middle School: Grade 6 to Grade 8
- High School: Grade 9 to Grade 12 (International Baccalaureate Diploma Program is offered in Grades 11 and 12)

== Program ==
- the American High School Diploma
- the International Baccalaureate (IB Diploma) Program
- the Spanish Baccalaureate certificate

BFIS standards reflect the international benchmarking of Achieve and the US Common Core Standards. The school is accredited by the Middle States Association of Colleges and Schools and the Spanish Ministry of Education. English is the instructional language, with language courses offered in Spanish, Catalan and French.

== After-school activities ==
BFIS offers three different after-school programs:

- Arts and Academics: ceramics, video-animation, French, Dutch, Chinese, creative writing, cinema, robotics.
- Performing Arts: theater, musical, orchestra, choir, individual instrument and singing classes, dance.
- Sports: Swimming, tennis, multi-sports, fencing, taekwondo, soccer, basketball, and volleyball.

== Faculty ==
Teachers: 110

- US Nationality: 38%
- Spanish Nationality: 31%
- International Nationality: 30%

Native Language

- English: 57%
- Spanish: 36%
- Other: 7%

== International community ==
BFIS community is integrated by approximately one third breakdown among US, Spanish and international families. The students, faculty, and parents represent over 45 nationalities and cultural heritages.
