= International School of Central Switzerland =

Coordinates: 47.1913892°N 8.4540218°E

Location
- Lorzenparkstrasse 8 Cham, Canton of Zug, 6330; Switzerland

Information
- Other name: ISCS
- Type: Private international school
- Motto: Helping Every Learner Shine
- Grades: K–12
- Gender: Mixed
- Age range: 3–18
- Language: English
- Colours: Red and Blue
- Accreditation: Cambridge International School
- Affiliation: Swiss Group of International Schools
- Website: iscs-zug.ch

The International School of Central Switzerland (ISCS) is a private international school in Cham, Canton of Zug, Switzerland. It serves students aged 3 to 18 in Kindergarten through Year 13 and is a Cambridge International School.

== History ==
The Primary School was founded in 2008 and opened in August 2009. The Middle School was launched in August 2012 and the school became an International School in October 2013. The secondary school started in August 2014.

== Accreditation ==
ISCS' kindergarten, primary school (Primarstufe 1.-6. Klasse, grade 1–6) and lower-secondary school (Sekundarstufe I, grade 7–9) are approved by the bureau for elementary school (Amt für gemeindliche Schulen) and administration for education (Bildungsdirektion), canton of Zug.
