= Del Mar Academy =

School

Coordinates: 9.96313°N 85.65770°W

Del Mar Academy is a bilingual (Spanish-English) school in Nosara, Costa Rica, that serves students from pre-kindergarten to grade 12. It is accredited by the Costa Rican Ministry of Education (MEP) and by IB World School, offering both the International Baccalaureate (IB) Diploma Programme and IB Middle Years Programme.

The school has approximately 300 students from many countries and is located on an 11 acre campus on the Pacific coast in Nosara, Guanacaste, Costa Rica.
