= Colégio Luso-Internacional do Porto =

Coordinates: 41.1733372°N 8.6710958°W

Colégio Luso- Internacional do Porto
- Oporto International School
- Porto; Portugal

Information
- Type: Private international school
- Motto: We Are One
- Established: 1988
- Grades: K-12
- Gender: Coeducational
- Houses: Kappa, Sigma, Delta, Lambda
- Accreditation: CIS; Ministry of Education
- Website: www.clip.pt

The Colégio Luso-Internacional do Porto (abbreviated as CLIP; Portuguese for Luso-International School of Porto), officially known in English as the Oporto International School, is a private international school in Porto, Portugal.

== History ==
CLIP was founded in 1988 as an initiative of the Luso-International Foundation for Education and Culture. CLIP inaugurated its first class in 1990 (school year 1990-91) with a class of 44 students.

CLIP is a fully accredited school by the Council of International Schools (CIS), since 2013.

== Student body ==
Today CLIP has approximately 1000 students, aged 3 to 18, from more than 40 countries, representing 35% of the student body.

== OPOMUN ==
CLIP annually hosts the Oporto Model United Nations (OPOMUN) since 2007.
