= International School of Bremen =

Coordinates: 53.108849°N 8.858119°E

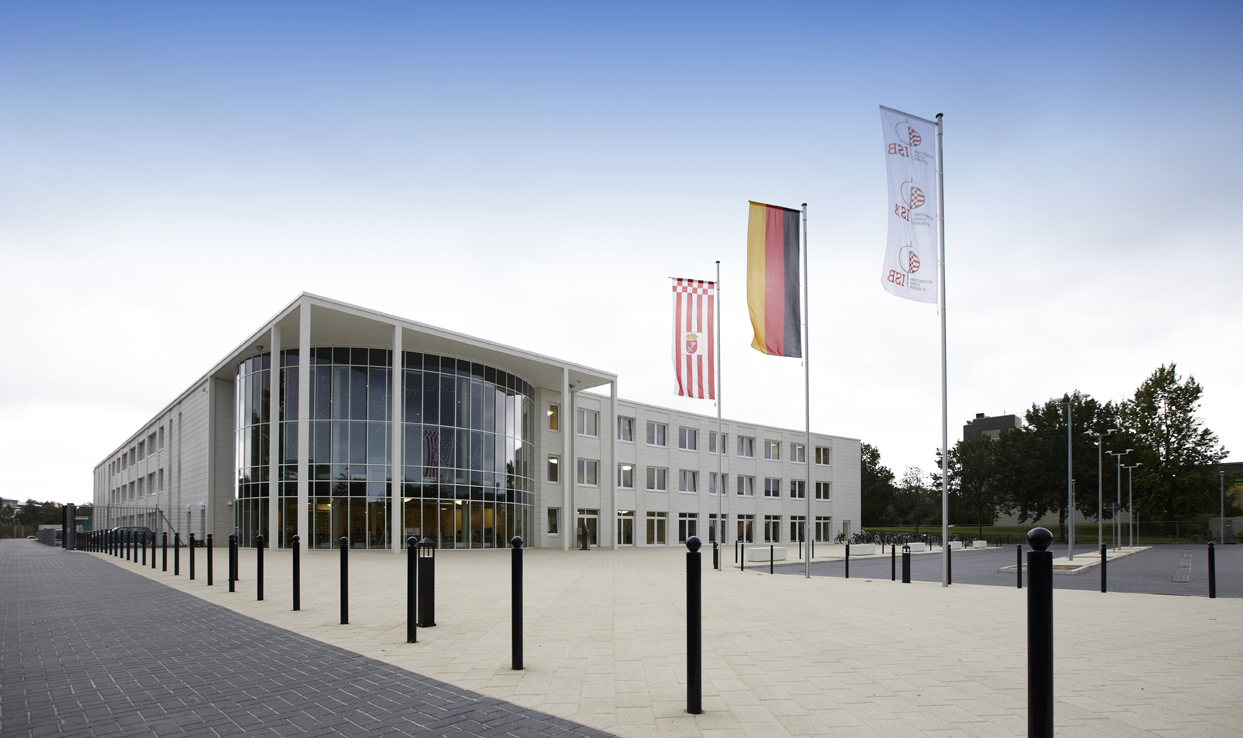
- Badgasteiner Str. 11, 28359 Bremen; Germany

Information
- Type: Private
- Established: 1998
- Director: Jamie Perfect
- Grades: EL 1 (age 3) to Grade 12
- Enrollment: 380
- Language: English
- Website: www.isbremen.de

International School in Bremen (ISB) is a private, co-educational, English-speaking school that was established in 1998 in Bremen - Horn-Lehe,, Badgasteiner Straße 11/Hochschulring, Germany. Jamie Perfect became Director of the school in 2018, following Malcom Davis.
