= Scuola Svizzera di Milano =

- German: Schweizer Schule Mailand; French: École Suisse de Milan; Romansh: Scola Svizra Milaun
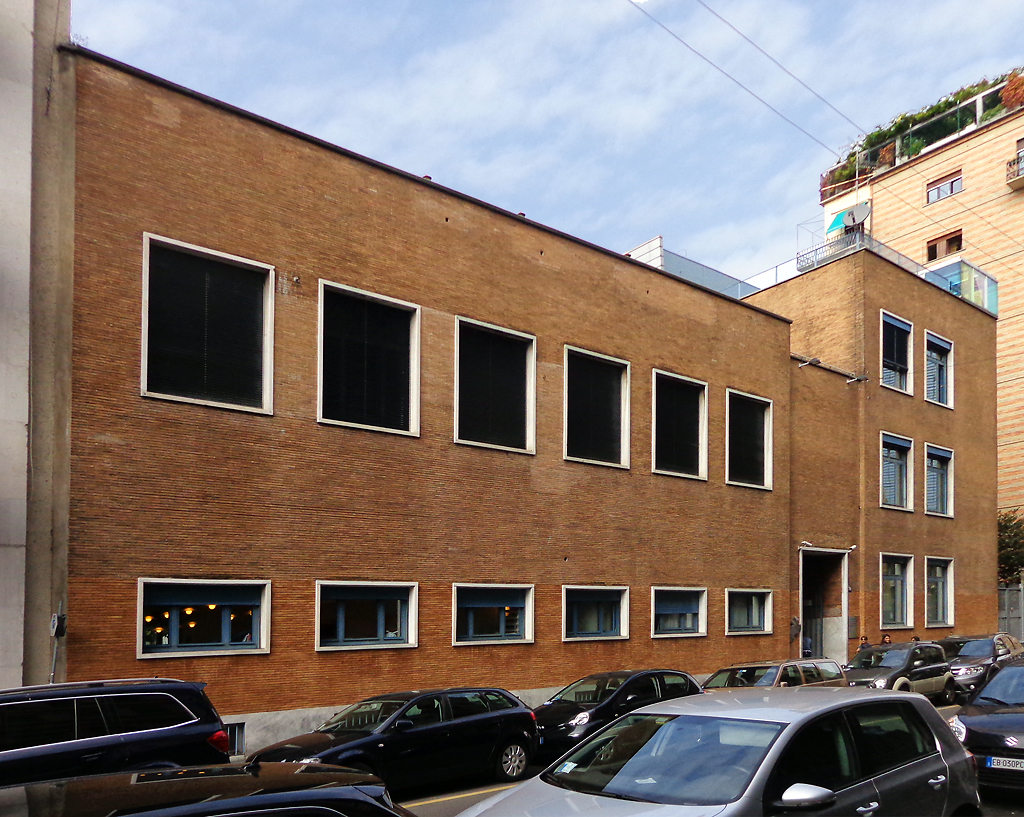

Information
- Established: 1919; 107 years ago

Scuola Svizzera di Milano (SSM; German: Schweizer Schule Mailand; French: École Suisse de Milan; Romansh: Scola Svizra Milaun) is a Swiss international school in Milan, Italy. It serves Kindergarten/Materna through Obserstufe/Liceo (senior high school).

It was first established in 1919.

== Notable alumni ==
- Bigna Francis-von Wyttenbach, Swiss writer
