= Rotterdam International Secondary School =

Coordinates: 51°55′28″N 4°27′23″E

Information
- Principal: Lani du Plessis
- Enrollment: c.400
- Language: English

The Rotterdam International Secondary School, or RISS for short, is an international school located in the Blijdorp area of Rotterdam in the Netherlands. English is used as the medium of instruction.

== Students ==
As of September 2021, the school had around 400 students which has grown since 2017. RISS boasts a wide variety of students from all around the world. In 2017, 82 countries were represented.

== Location ==
The school is near the Rotterdam Central Station and is housed across two campasus. It is part of the Wolfert van Borselen group of schools.

The junior campus is located on Bentincklaan 294, 3039KK, Rotterdam. The senior campus is located on Schimmelpenninckstraat 23, 3039 KS Rotterdam.

== Programmes ==
The school offers the International Baccalaureate Diploma Programme and the IGCSE in the two exam years.

== School Principal ==
The School Principal is Lani du Plessis.

== Levels ==
The school has 3 main levels, Foundation Course, IGCSE, and IB. 3 years in foundation course (ages 11 – 14), 2 years in IGCSE (ages 15–16), and 2 years in IB (ages 17–18).
