= Lodge School (Malaysia) =

Private school in Sarawak, Malaysia

Lodge School is a private school located in Kuching, Sarawak, Malaysia, established in 1953.

Lodge Group of Schools now operates under four different entities, namely:

- Lodge Kindergarten (Tadika Lodge T.1006)
- Lodge International School (Sekolah Antarabangsa Lodge SAS.1013)
- Lodge Primary School (Sekolah Rendah Lodge SRS.1008)
- Lodge Secondary School (Solah Menengah Lodge SMS.1020)
