= Port Said American School =

International school in Cairo, Egypt

Port Said American School (PSAS)
- Zamalek; Egypt

Information
- Type: Under authority of the National Institutes
- Established: 2000
- Head of school: Gihan S. Soliman
- Enrollment: 278

Port Said American School is a school, founded in 2000, in the suburbs of Greater Cairo, Egypt. It is a division of the Port Said Language Schools. The school campus is situated in Zamalek. It is accredited by AdvancEd, receiving its accreditation on 2001.

(After-revolution)Call for reform

International Day2011 -PSAS
