= CJM =

CJM or cjm can refer to:

- Canadian Journal of Mathematics
- Convent of Jesus and Mary, a network of Roman Catholic schools around the world
- Colegio Japonés de Madrid, a Japanese international school in Madrid, Spain
- Chumphon Airport, an airport in Chumphon, Thailand, by IATA code
- Contemporary Jewish Museum, a museum in San Francisco, California, U.S.
- Cham language, a language spoken in Vietnam and Cambodia, by ISO 639 code
- Chief Judicial Magistrate, a type of magistrate in India; see Magistrate#India
- Coach Jack Meagher Award, which American football player Jack Meagher received in 2015

== See also ==
- CJM Fiscal Management, an American wealth management firm
- CJM Bourges Basket, the former name of a women's basketball club from Bourges, France
- CJM Racing, a NASCAR racing team from 2006 to 2009
