= Japanese people in Spain =

- (Japan) (Spain)

Total population
- 8,080 (October 2015)

Regions with significant populations
- Madrid, Catalonia, Las Palmas

Languages
- Spanish, Japanese

Related ethnic groups
- Japanese diaspora

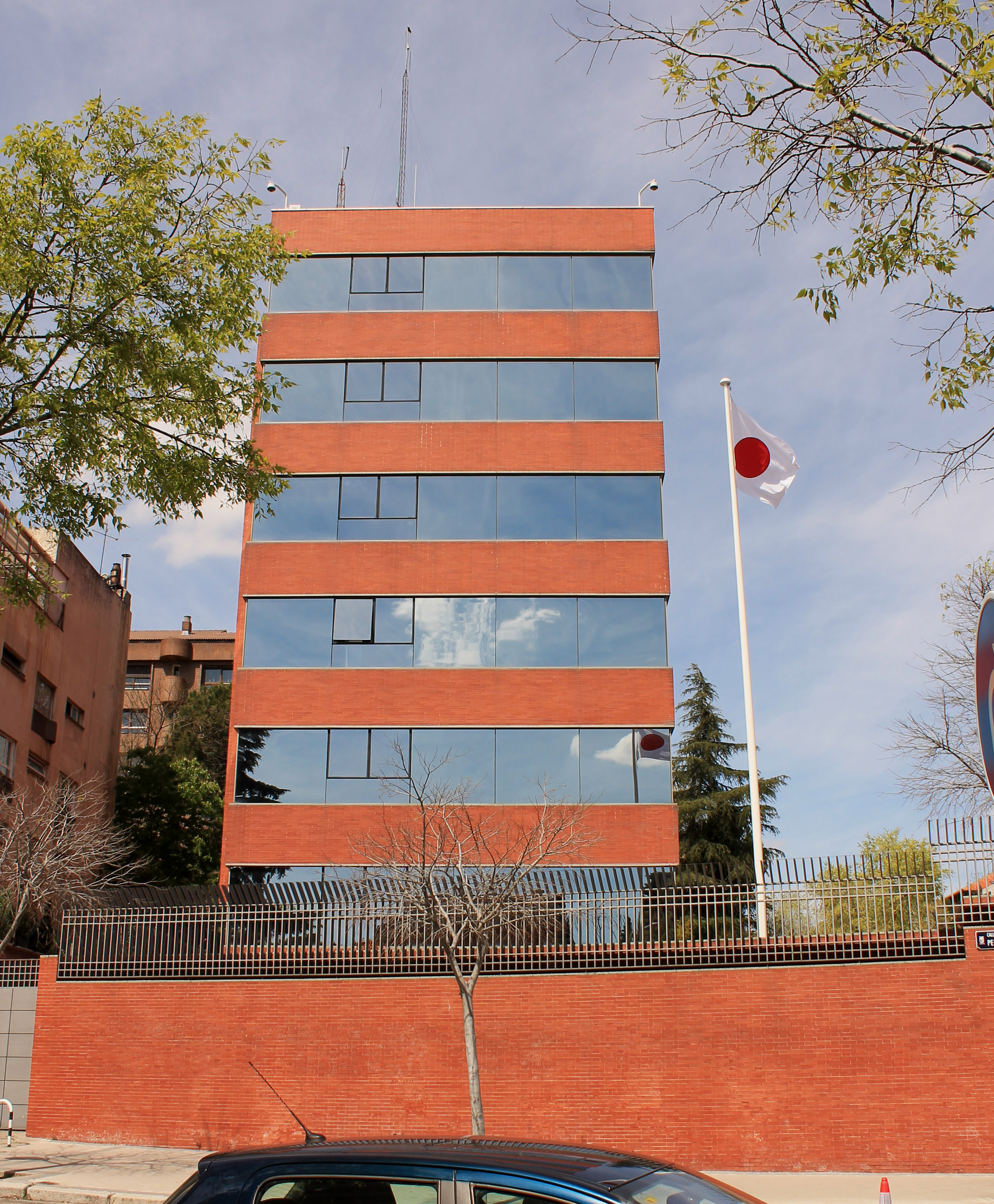
Japanese Embassy in Madrid

Japanese people in Spain consist largely of expatriate managers in Japanese corporations, as well as international students. There are also some people of Japanese ancestry in Spain, including descendants of 17th-century migrants to Spain, as well as migrants from among Nikkei populations in Latin America. According to Spain's National Statistical Institute, 4,898 Japanese citizens resided in the country as of 2009; Japan's Ministry of Foreign Affairs gave a higher figure of 8,080 as of 2015.

== History ==
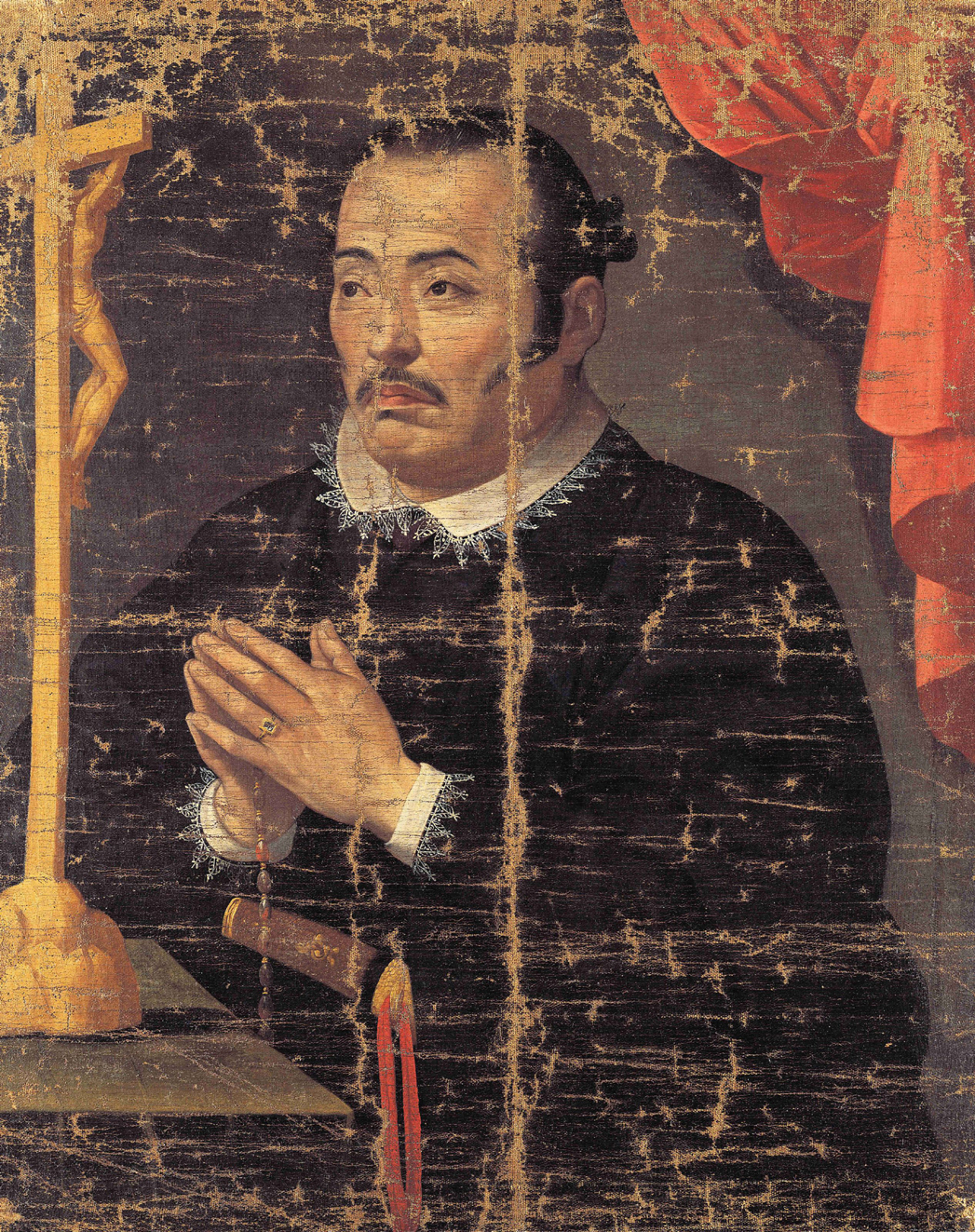
Hasekura Tsunenaga in prayer, following his conversion to Christianity in Madrid in 1615.

The first Japanese people to settle in Spain were the members of an embassy led by Hasekura Tsunenaga. Instead of returning to Japan in 1617, six samurai remained in Coria del Río, near Seville. The surname Japón (Spanish for "Japan") is conserved among approximately 700 inhabitants of Coria del Río, identifying them as descendants of the members of Hasekura Tsunenaga's delegation.

The first Japanese business established in Spain was SANYO España.S.A. in 1969. Since then Catalonia became the main point of Japanese business operations in Spain.

Between the 1970s and 1980s, Nikkeis—people of Japanese ancestry from various countries of Latin America—settled in Spain, fleeing financial crises or political oppression in their home countries. Since the 1970s, many Japanese have also come to Spain as businesspeople and students. In 1966, there were only about 280 Japanese nationals in Spain, but this number grew to 2,824 by 1993.

== Demographics ==
As of 2001 5,167 Japanese citizens resided in Spain, with 1,189 of them in Barcelona and 87 of them in the remainder of Catalonia. Most residing in Catalonia are employees of Japanese companies.

There are an estimated 2,000 people of Japanese descent in the Madrid area, most of them working for Japanese firms.

The peak number of the Japanese population in Las Palmas registered with the Japanese consulate there was 365 people in 1977.

== Institutions ==
The Barcelona Suiyokai is an association of Japanese companies that operates in Barcelona. It operates a Japanese new year festival. In 2004 57 companies were a part of the association.

In Barcelona there is also a Go club, a Haiku club, an association of Japanese language teachers, an association of the alumni of the Japanese complementary school, a golf club, and a Hispano-Japanese association.

In addition to the Japanese consulate, in Las Palmas there was the Casa de Japan (日本船員保険福祉会館, Nihon Sen'in Hoken Fukushi Kaikan) and a Japanese association. The Casa opened in 1967 in Monte Lentiscal and its annex opened in October 1973. The main building closed in June 1981 and the annex closed in December 1985.

== Health care ==
From 1971 to 1981 there were Japanese nurses sent to the Queen Victoria and Santa Catalina hospitals in Las Palmas to assist Japanese sailors.

== Education ==
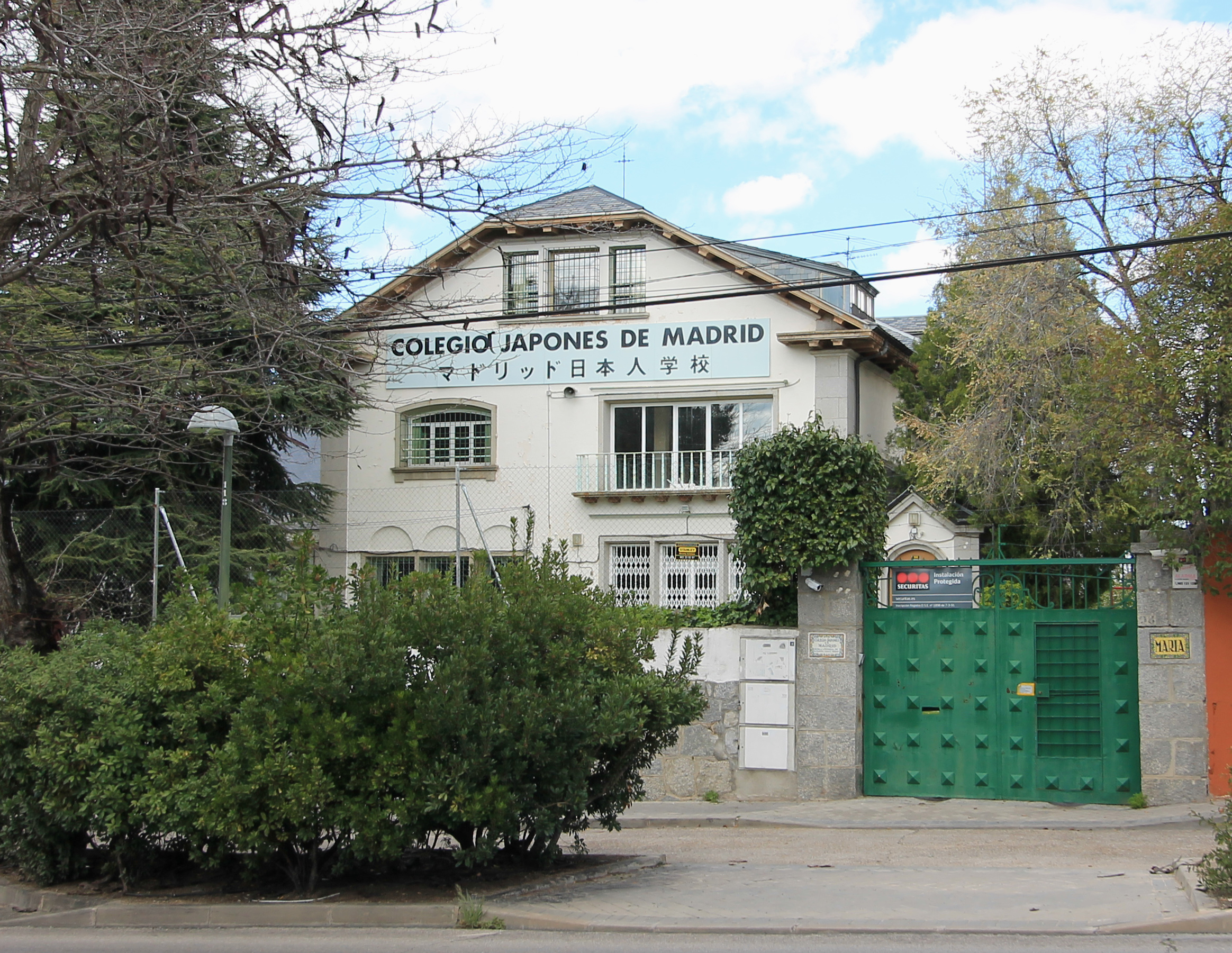
Colegio Japonés de Madrid

Spain has two Japanese international schools: the Japanese School in Barcelona and the Colegio Japonés de Madrid. The two cities, Barcelona and Madrid, also have weekend Japanese education programmes.

The Colegio Japonés de Las Palmas previously existed. Located in Tafira Baja, it opened in October 1973, making it the first Japanese school in Spain and the third-oldest in Europe. It closed in March 2001.

There is a Japanese library in Eixample, Barcelona that opened in 1992. Most of the patrons are Japanese, though locals may also use the facilities. The library is located inside a flat.

== Notable people ==
- Kiyoshi Uematsu, Spanish judoka
- Kenji Uematsu, Spanish judoka
- Yuu Shirota, actor and singer (Originally from Tokyo, Japan)
- David Silva, professional footballer
- Pedro Shimose, poet, professor and essayist; his working and living in Madrid.
- Rayito, musician and producer

== See also ==
- Japan–Spain relations
- Japanese diaspora
- Immigration to Spain
