= BJS =

BJS may refer to:

== Businesses ==
- BJ's Wholesale Club, a bulk retailer
- BJ's Restaurant & Brewery, a casual dining restaurant chain
- BJ Services Company, now a subsidiary of Baker Hughes

== Geography ==
- BJS, combined IATA airport code for Beijing, China metropolitan area
- Beijing Subway, Beijing's rapid transit system

== Organisations ==
- Bureau of Justice Statistics, a unit of the United States Department of Justice whose principal function is the compilation and analysis of data and the dissemination of information for statistical purposes
- Brimington Junior School, a school in Chesterfield, Derbyshire
- Broomhill Junior school, a school in Brislington, Bristol
- Budapesti Japán Iskola or The Japanese School of Budapest, a Japanese international school in Hungary

== Politics ==
- Bharatiya Jana Sangh, a political party in India
- British Journal of Sociology, a sociological journal
- British Journal of Surgery, a surgical journal

== People ==
- Bryan Jay Singer, American film director

== Language ==
- 'bjs', the (ISO 639-2 and ISO 639-5 codes) for the Bajan Creole language of Barbados.

== See also ==
- BJ (disambiguation)
