= YJS =

YJS may refer to:

- Yangon Japanese School, a Japanese international school in Burma, Myanmar
- YJS, the IATA code for Samjiyon Airport, Ryanggang Province, North Korea
