= Scuola Giapponese di Roma =

- ローマ日本人学校

Location
- Via di Monte Cucco, 127, 00148; Rome; Italy; 41.842581°N 12.440212°E

Information
- Type: Japanese international school
- Website: scuolagiapponeseroma.it

The Scuola Giapponese di Roma (ローマ日本人学校, Rōma Nihonjin Gakkō; English: "Japanese School of Rome") is a Japanese international school in Rome, Italy. The day school serves kindergarten, elementary, and junior high school levels.

The school, officially opened in 1991 after being accredited by the Japanese Government in 1990, serves Rome's Japanese community, which had 1,285 people in 2010. The school itself had, as of 2011, 40 students, a number that is lower than previous years due to the Great Recession causing some Japanese companies to close operations in Rome. The student number has declined even further since then, as there are 19 students enrolled at the school as of September 2022. The school also has a weekend programme for students who attend Italian schools during the week. The Japanese Weekend School of Rome (ローマ日本語補習授業校 Rōma Nihongo Hoshū Jugyō Kō; Scuola Giapponese di Istruzione Complementare di Roma) is held on the school property.

The school also includes the Roma Japanese Kindergarten (ローマ日本人幼稚園 Rōma Nihonjin Yōchien; Scuola Materna Giapponese).

It was formerly at Via Antelao, 14. It moved to its current location in 2003.

== See also ==
- Scuola Giapponese di Milano
