= Japanese community of Shanghai =

Ethnic expatriate community

Shanghai has a Japanese expatriate group, particularly in the Gubei area of Changning District, which houses the majority of Japanese expatriates in Shanghai. Some Japanese follow the "Shanghai dream" where they spend several years in Shanghai to gain professional experience or knowledge of Mandarin Chinese, and either continue working in Shanghai or return to Japan later.

== History ==
The Consulate-General of Japan in Shanghai opened in 1872. Japanese ships became a more constant presence in the Shanghai harbor in the 1870s and 1880s. In the 1880s Japanese companies began establishing operations in Shanghai. Prince Fushimi visited the Japanese community of Shanghai for one day in 1907. In 1908 a Japanese Club opened.

With mounting Japanese aggression towards China after the First World War, the Shanghainese organised protests against the Japanese occupation of Manchuria in 1931 and the bombing of Shanghai by the Japanese in 1932. A Japanese sailor, Tomomitsu Taminato, was murdered in Shanghai in 1936 due to increasing anti-Japanese sentiment. The Japanese invaded and occupied Shanghai in 1937, remaining until their unconditional surrender to the United States and its allies in 1945. Prince Kan'in Haruhito was tasked with personally visiting the city to ensure that the Imperial Japanese Army and Navy observed its terms.

Over 33,000 Japanese resided in Shanghai by 2008, making up 22% of the foreigners there and making the Japanese the largest expatriate group in that city.

== Economy ==
Some long-term residents are employees of Japanese companies stationed in Shanghai. The companies pay for living expenses including tuition for children, housing, and "hardship" allowances related to living in a foreign country. Some long-term Japanese residents have consultancies, restaurants, and businesses in Shanghai.

Takatoshi Iijima, the vice president of Sola Kamome Co., stated in 2010 that many Japanese companies in Shanghai hire Japanese already in the city instead of Japanese in Japan in order to reduce costs.

As of 2009 some Japanese who had newly graduated from universities arrive in Shanghai to try to gain employment on the spot.

== Education ==
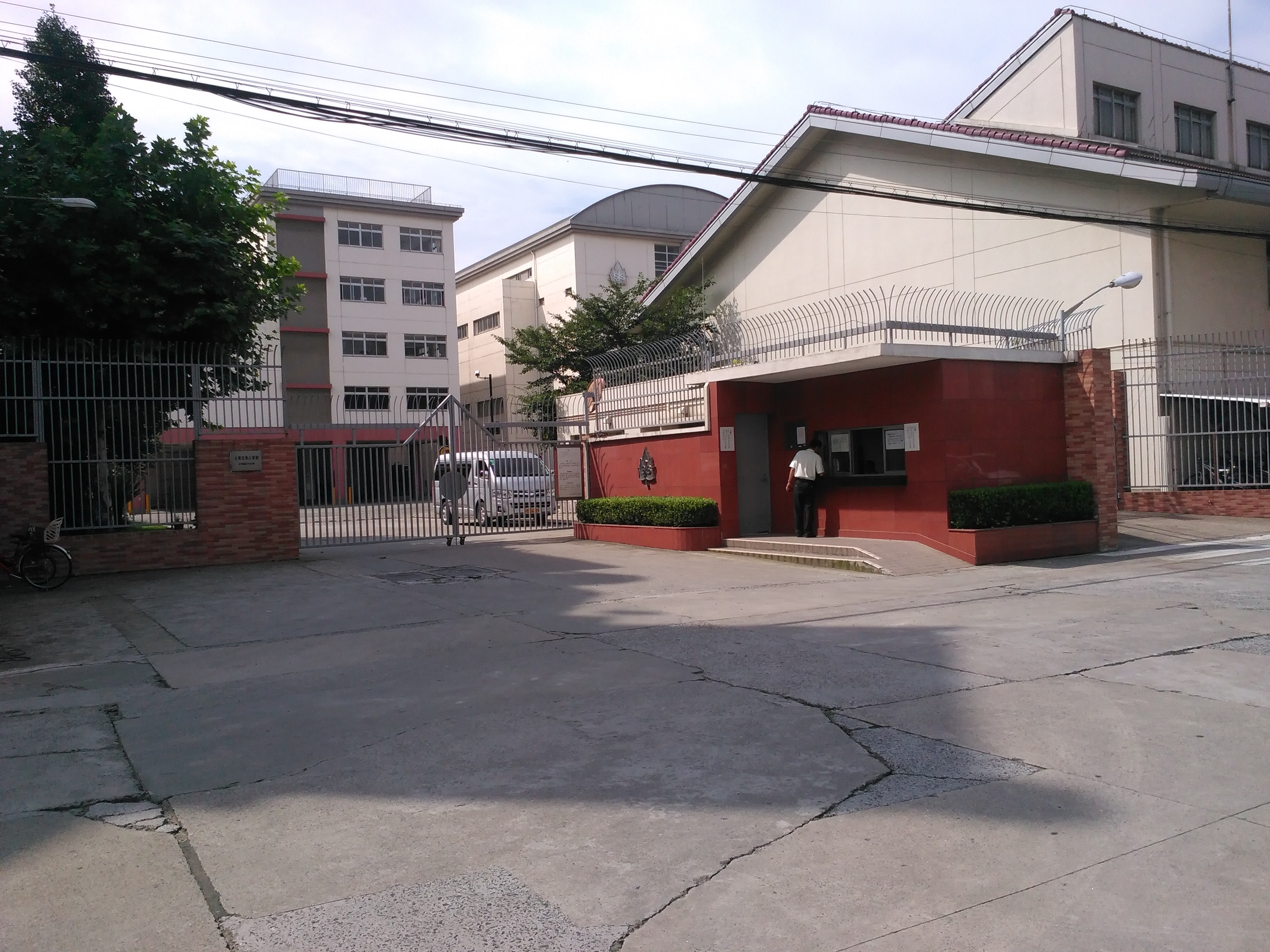
Shanghai Japanese School Hongqiao Campus

The Shanghai Japanese School, a Japanese international school serving primary, junior high, and senior high school levels, is located in Shanghai. It has two campuses, one in Hongqiao and one in Pudong.

Japanese kindergartens in Shanghai include Shanghai Dongjin Japanese Kindergarten (上海东进日本人幼儿园), Shanghai Utsukushigaoka Montessori Kindergarten (上海美丘第一幼儿园) and the Oisca Shanghai Japanese Kindergarten (上海奥伊斯嘉日本语幼儿园).

=== History of education ===
The first Japanese educational system school, the Tōyō gakkan, opened on Zhapu Road in 1883. Its primary focus was teaching Chinese and English to its students and its founders were associated with the Japan Popular Rights Movement. After several months it closed. It was not affiliated with the Higashi Honganji. The Ajia gakkan, which was created as what Joshua A. Fogel, author of Articulating the Sinosphere: Sino-Japanese Relations in Space and Time, described as a "kind of extension" of the Tōyō gakkan, opened in 1884 on Kunshan Road. It was established by young men who had involvement in the Popular Rights Movement and other pan-Asian groups. The Japan Residents Association acquired the management of the Japanese education in 1907. Japanese schools had opened in Shanghai by 1920. In 1926, 2,700 pupils studied at these schools. Christopher Howe wrote that students at the Japanese High School for Girls received an education superior to that in Japanese schools in Japan.

== Recreation ==
As of 2010 there is an all-Japanese baijiu club in Shanghai.

== Notable residents ==
- Zheng Pingru (of partial Japanese ancestry)

== See also ==
- Japanese people in China
- Battle of Shanghai
