= Japanese School of Phnom Penh =

International school in Phnom Penh, Cambodia

- プノンペン日本人学校

Location
- No. 205B, Street 2009, Sangkat Tuek Thla, Khan Sen Sok; Phnom Penh; Cambodia; 11°33′56″N 104°52′01″E

Information
- School type: Japanese international school
- Established: 2015; 11 years ago
- Principal: 伊藤 潔
- Grades: 1–9
- Enrollment: 54 (2026)
- Language: Japanese
- Website: jspp.tv

Japanese School of Phnom Penh (プノンペン日本人学校, Punonpen Nihonjin Gakkō) is a full-time Japanese school in Sangkat Toek Thla in Sen Sok Section. The institution, serving elementary and junior high school, is 1.5 kilometres (0.93 mi) northeast of Phnom Penh International Airport.

== History ==
Prior to the school's establishment, there was an increased number of Japanese families with children in Cambodia that occurred after the growth of Japanese business operations. In 2013 the Japanese Business Association of Cambodia established a committee for making a day school. It was established in 2015, with 14 teachers and 21 students upon opening. It is the first full Japanese day school in Cambodia.
