= IJS =

IJS may refer to:

- ISU Judging System or International Judging System, scoring system for figure skating
- Institute of Jazz Studies, library and archive in Newark, New Jersey
- International Journal of Speleology, scientific journal founded in 1978
- International Society for Evangelisation of the Jews, a Christian organisation, predecessor to the Christian Witness to Israel
- Islamabad Japanese School, international school in Islamabad
- Jožef Stefan Institute, science and technology institute in Ljubljana, Slovenia
- Southeast Ijo language (ISO 639 code)
- Sisters of the Infant Jesus, Catholic religious institute in Paris
