= Japanese school =

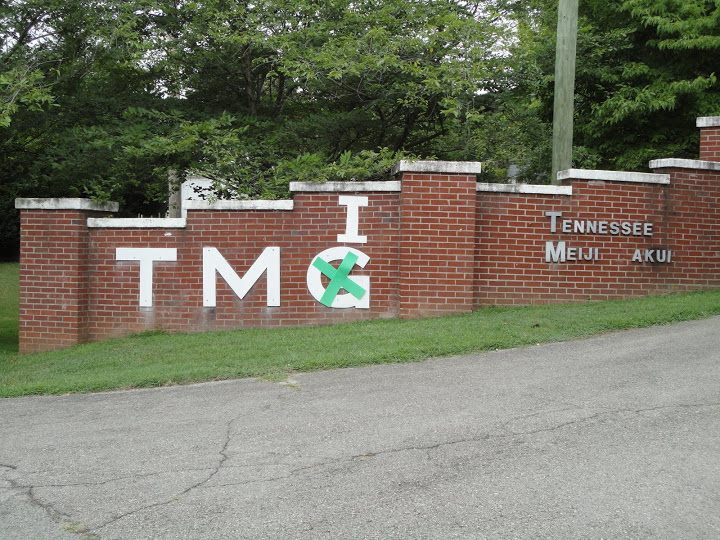
Tennessee Meiji Gakuin High School, an example of a shiritsu zaigai kyōiku shisetsu

Zaigai kyōiku shisetsu (在外教育施設 'Overseas educational institution'), or in English, Japanese international school or overseas Japanese school, may refer to one of three types of institutions officially classified by the Ministry of Education, Culture, Sports, Science and Technology (MEXT or Monbushō):

- Nihonjin gakkō (日本人学校), a full-time school outside Japan for the native speakers of Japanese which provides elementary and junior high school levels (with one in Shanghai also having a Japan-system senior high school). Accredited by MEXT.
- Hoshū jugyō kō (補習授業校) or Hoshūkō (補習校), a supplementary school outside Japan. It offers a part of Nihonjin gakkō's curriculum after school hours or on weekends. Accredited by MEXT.
- Shiritsu zaigai kyōiku shisetsu (私立在外教育施設 'private overseas educational institution'), a full-time overseas campus of a Japanese private school, thus run by a Japan-based private school corporation. They may include primary school, junior high school, and/or senior high school components. Each one is accredited by Japan's MEXT.

== See also ==
- Language school, a school for non-speakers of a language (such as Japanese) to learn the language.
