= Japan–Spain relations =

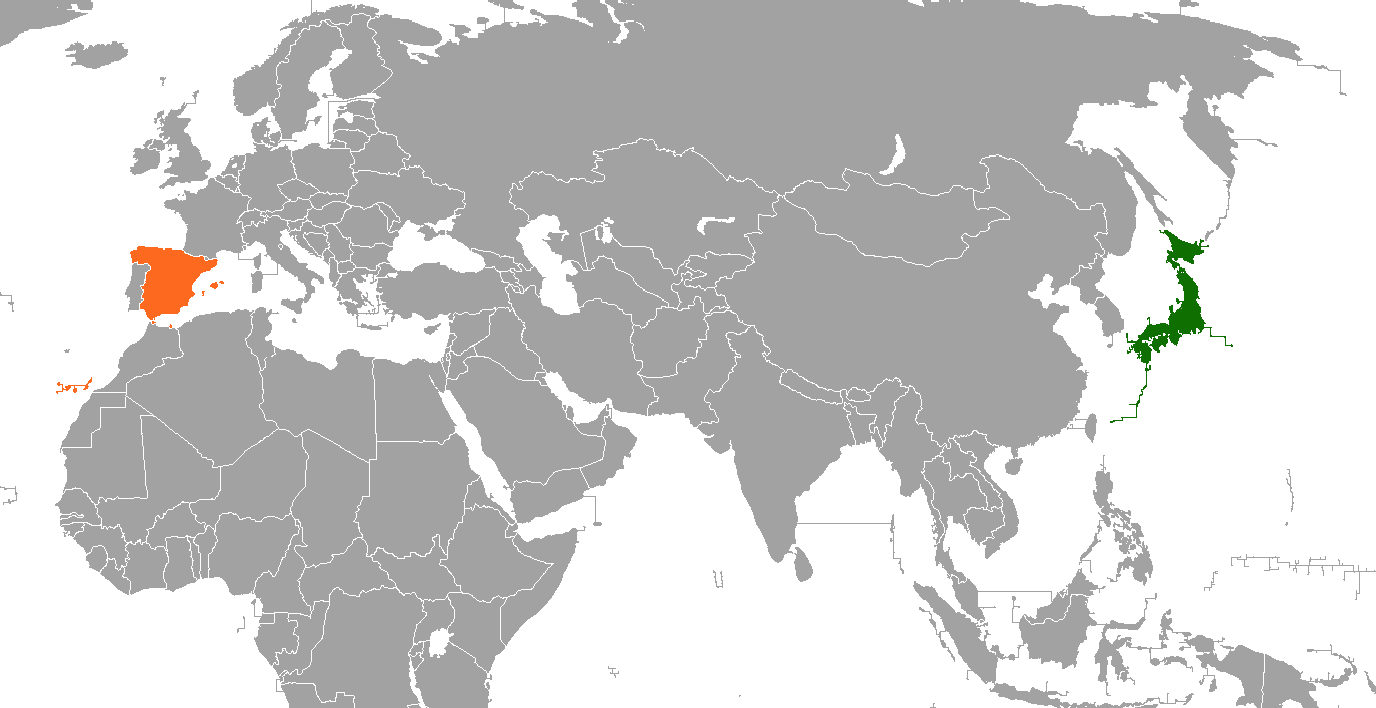
- Japan: Spain

Japan–Spain relations are the bilateral relations between Japan and Spain. Both nations are members of the Organisation for Economic Co-operation and Development.

== History ==
=== Early history ===
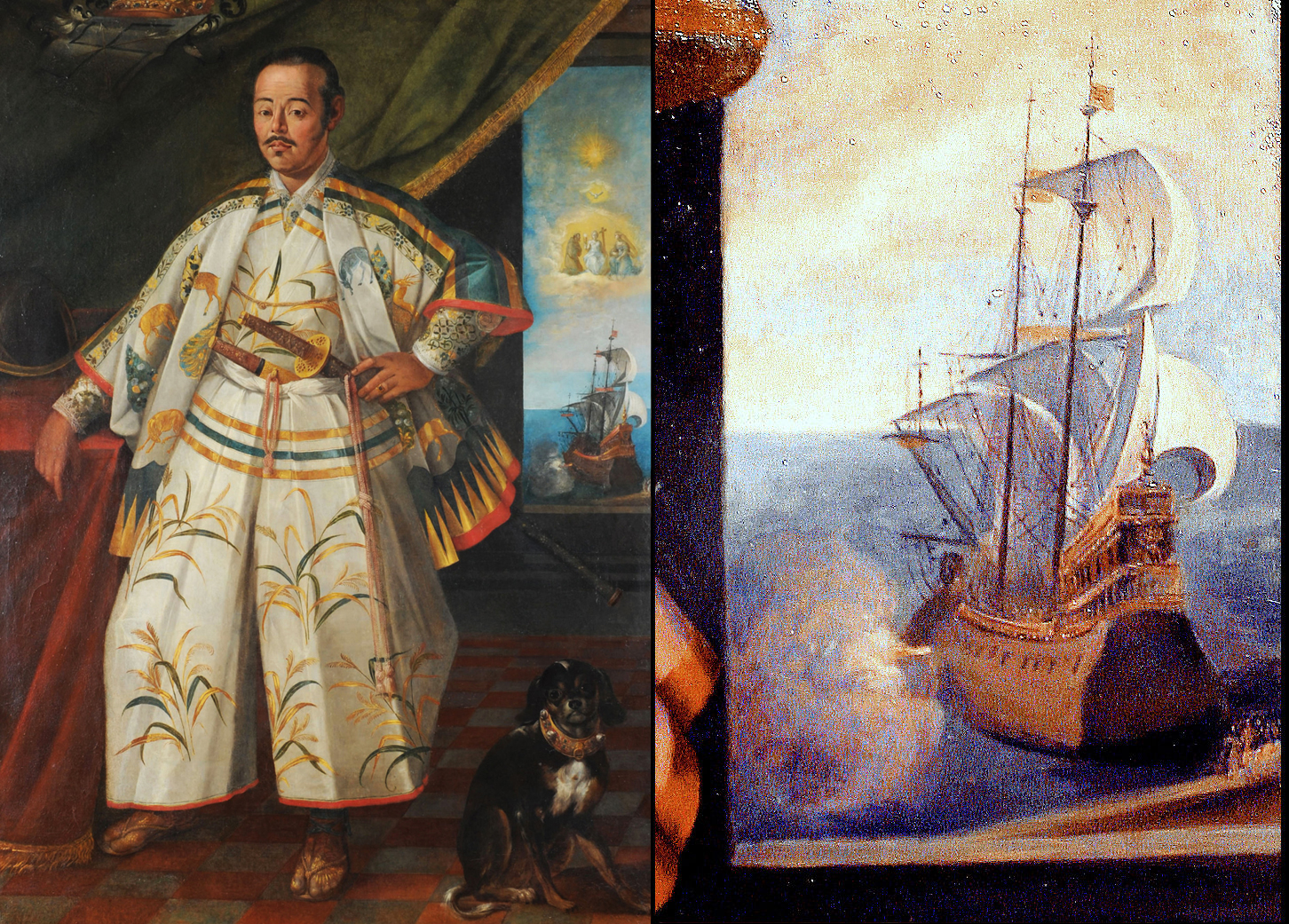
Hasekura Tsunenaga, the first Japanese ambassador to Spain

The first contact between Japan and Spain occurred in 1549 when Spanish missionary Francis Xavier arrived in Japan. While in Japan, Xavier embarked upon a major evangelizing project and he founded the first Catholic colony in Japan.

In 1565, Spain created the Manila-Acapulco trade route, which was a trade routes between Manila, capital of the Philippines and the Mexican port of Acapulco (both nations under Spanish rule at the time). Through this trade route, Spanish galleons sailed from Acapulco to the Philippines and traded with neighboring countries/territories within the vicinity. Some of those territories were the islands of Japan. In Manila, Japanese trading boats would arrive and bring goods and food to trade with the New Spanish government. From Manila, Spanish vessels would transport the goods back to Acapulco, traverse the Mexican terrain until they reached the port of Veracruz and from there transport the goods onto another Spanish vessel for sail to Spain.

In 1582, a group of Japanese Christian delegates known as the Tenshō embassy left Nagasaki, Japan and traveled on a grand tour of Europe. In 1584, the embassy arrived to Toledo and Madrid where they met with King Philip II of Spain. In October 1613, the first official Japanese diplomatic mission was sent to New Spain by Date Masamune, a regional strongman. This diplomatic mission was to be known as the Keichō embassy and it was the second diplomatic mission to travel to Europe after the Tenshō embassy. The Japanese ambassador, Hasekura Tsunenaga traveled from Japan to Acapulco and met with the Spanish viceroy Diego Fernández de Córdoba. In Mexico City (the capital of New Spain), Hasekura met with several colonial leaders and offered the New Spanish government free commerce between the New Spanish territories and Japan and asked for a group of Christian missionaries to return to Japan. The diplomatic mission also offered to expel both English and Dutch citizens from the country because both nations were considered at the time to be enemies of the Spanish king. In June 1614, Hasekura left New Spain via Veracruz and continued on his journey to Spain to meet with the Spanish king leaving behind a small delegation. In Spain, Hasekura was baptized a catholic and changed his name to Francisco Felipe Faxicura. Two years later in February 1617, Hasekura/Faxicura returned from Spain to Veracruz and traveled to Mexico City. Before leaving Spain, Hasekura left behind six samurais in the town of Coria del Río where their descendants remain today with the surname of Japón.

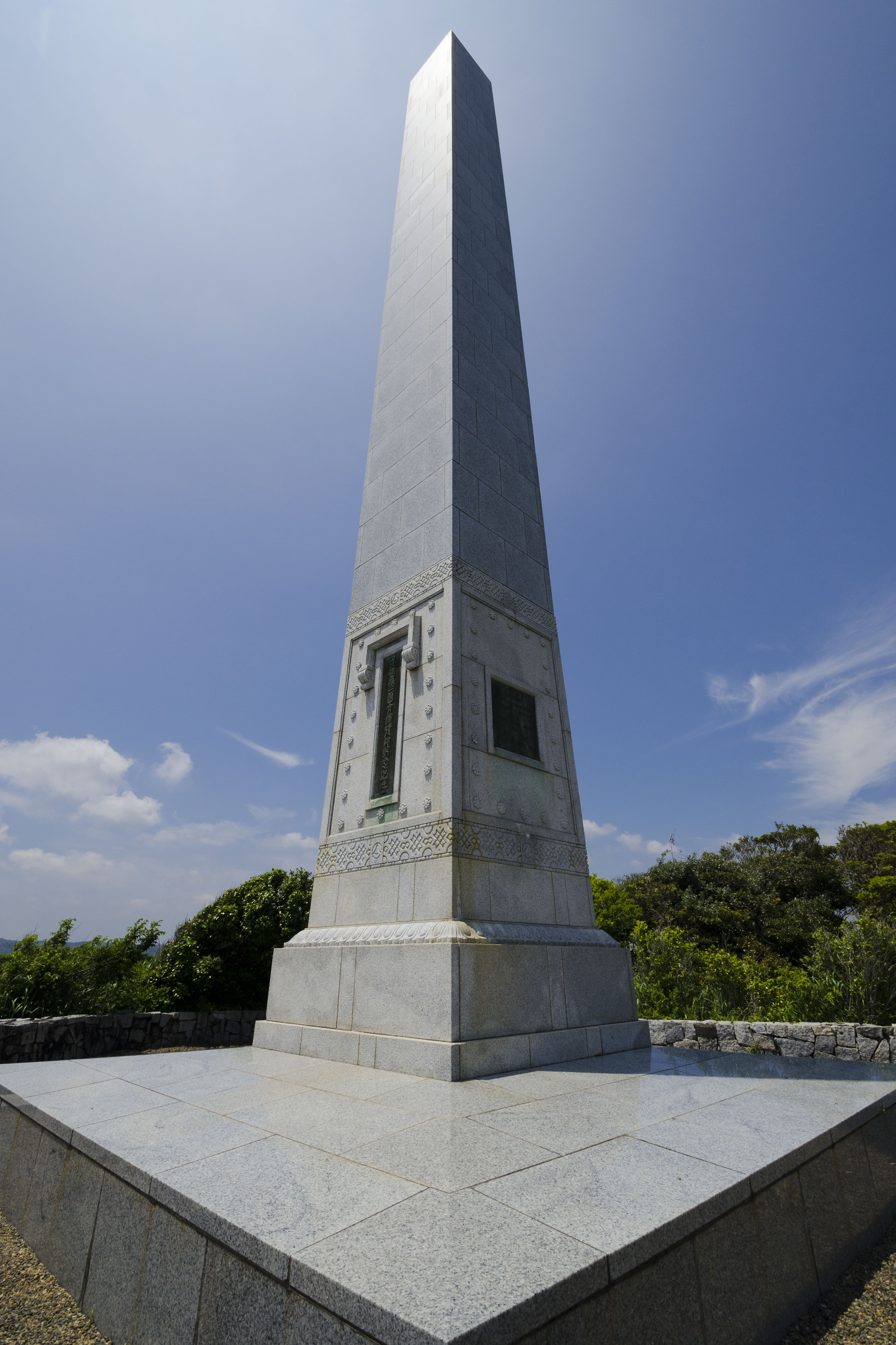
Birthplace Monument of Traffic and Friendship between Japan, Spain and Mexico in Onjuku, Japan

In 1618, Hasekura and his diplomatic mission set sail from New Spain and returned to Japan. On arrival, they were confronted with the fact that the country had dramatically changed since their departure in 1613 and that anything related to Christianity had been banned. Hasekura and his delegation had to renounce their adopted religion. Since Hasekura's diplomatic mission to Spain, Japan entered a time of isolation and refused to trade with foreign nations. It wasn't until 12 November 1868 that Japan and Spain officially established diplomatic relations with the signing of the Treaty of Friendship, Commerce and Navigation.

=== Japan and Spanish Philippines ===
The Spanish diplomat F.E. Reynoso stated that during the coronation of Tsar Nicholas II in 1894, the Japanese made an offer of 40 million pounds sterling to buy the Philippines from Spain. At the time, the Philippines were a Spanish colony. However, according to the Reynoso, the Spanish did not accept this offer. According to the scholar C.E. Russell, in 1896 Spain was rumoured to have offered to sell the islands to Japan for $3,000,000 gold dollars, but this offer was rejected.

During the Philippine revolution, Japan gave sanctuary to Filipino rebels fighting against Spanish rule, including Jose Ramos who had a Japanese wife, and Jose Rizal. The Japanese had also blocked arms sales to the rebels and, at the request of Spain, had kept Filipino rebels in Japan under close surveillance.

The start of the uprising in 1896 coincided with a visit of the Japanese cruiser Kongo to Manila, and members of the Katipunan approached the captain of the ship in an attempt to negotiate an arms deal with Japan. However, no steps were taken to undermine the 1897 Treaty of Friendship and General Intercourse that was then being negotiated between Japan and Spain recognising each other's spheres of interest.

During the Spanish–American War Japan declared official neutrality.

=== Relations during the 1930s ===
Relations between Japan and the Spanish Republic were generally poor during the 1930s as the Spanish representative at the League of Nations had been prominent in efforts to sanction Japan's invasion of Manchuria in 1931. Following the outbreak of the Spanish Civil War, Japan at first withheld recognition from Franco's regime, though they also did not intervene when diplomats loyal to Franco seized control of the Spanish embassy in Tokyo and prevented the entry of the chargé d'affaires appointed by the Republican government.

José del Castillo, a Spanish diplomat in Japan loyal to the nationalist cause, first applied for official recognition of the Franco government by Japan in August 1937. Kōki Hirota, the Japanese foreign minister at the time, responded to this by suggesting to Italian and German diplomats that recognition of the Spanish nationalist government should, in his view, also involve recognition of the Japanese-controlled state of Manchukuo. Franco accepted this, and on 12 November 1937 the Japanese cabinet decided to recognise Nationalist Spain and announced the decision publicly. The official ceremony of recognition was held in Tokyo on 1 December 1937, and the Franco government in turn recognised Manchukuo the day after. Both Japan and Nationalist Spain went on to join the Anti-Comintern Pact.

=== World War II and post war relations ===
During World War II, Spain initially aligned itself with the Axis powers (although officially neutral during the war). Japan chose Spain for the representation of Japanese interests in the Latin-American republics. The imminent victory of the United States in the Pacific Ocean theatre induced a change in the Spanish diplomatic position vis-à-vis Japan and, using as pretext the massacre of Spanish nationals in the conflict, the former accused the later of deliberate attacks and toyed with the idea of a war declaration. Some members of the Spanish government viewed Japan as being "Anti-Christian and Anti-Western". On 17 March 1945, the Spanish government decided to withdraw its protection of Japanese interests. On 12 April 1945, Spain declared the rupture of diplomatic relations with Japan after Japanese troops murdered Spanish citizens and consular officials in Manila and thereafter burned their consulate. Soon, Japan began suffering setbacks in the Pacific and Spain decided not to pursue further actions against Japan.

Relations at the embassy-level were not fully re-established until 1952. In October 1980, Spanish King Juan Carlos I paid an official visit to Japan. In September 1994, Japanese Emperor Akihito paid an official visit to Spain. Since the initial visits, there have been several high level Royal and Governmental visits between leaders of both nations. In 2017, both nations celebrated 150 years of diplomatic relations.

== Agreements ==
Both nations have signed numerous agreements such as a Treaty of Friendship, Commerce and Navigation (1868); Agreement on the Elimination of Tourist Visas (1965); Agreement on Air Services (1980); Agreement on Cultural Cooperation (1982); Agreement on Scientific and Technological Cooperation (2011); Agreement on Exchange and Cooperation in Defense (2014); Agreement on Sports Cooperation (2017); Agreement on Economic and Industrial Cooperation (2017) and an Agreement on Scientific and Investigative Medical Cooperation (2017).

== Tourism ==
Spain is the 5th largest European destination for Japanese tourists with 473,000 Japanese citizens visiting Spain and spending more than €900 million Euros in 2017. During the same period, 100,000 Spanish citizens traveled to Japan. There are direct flights between Madrid and Tokyo with Iberia airlines.

== Trade ==
In 2015, trade between Japan and Spain totaled €5.5 billion (¥729 billion). Japan's main exports to Spain include chemical products, machinery and transportation equipment. Spain's exports to Japan include transportation equipment and machinery. Japanese cultural exports to Spain include anime, film, video games, and food. Japan is Spain's second largest trading partner in Asia and Spain is Japan's sixth largest trading partner within the European Union.

== Resident diplomatic missions ==
- Japan has an embassy in Madrid, a consulate-general in Barcelona and a consulate in Las Palmas.
- Spain has an embassy in Tokyo.
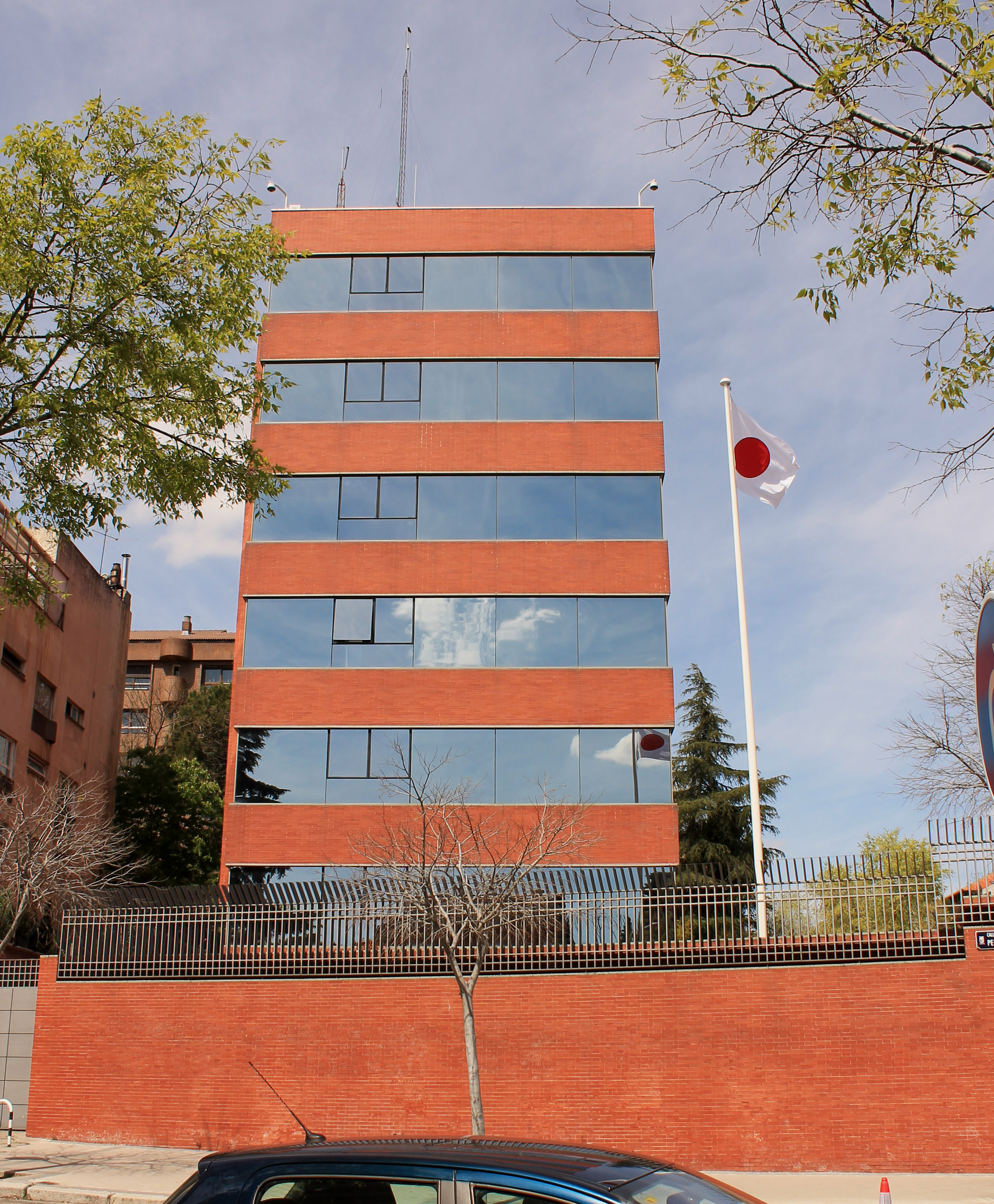
Embassy of Japan in Madrid

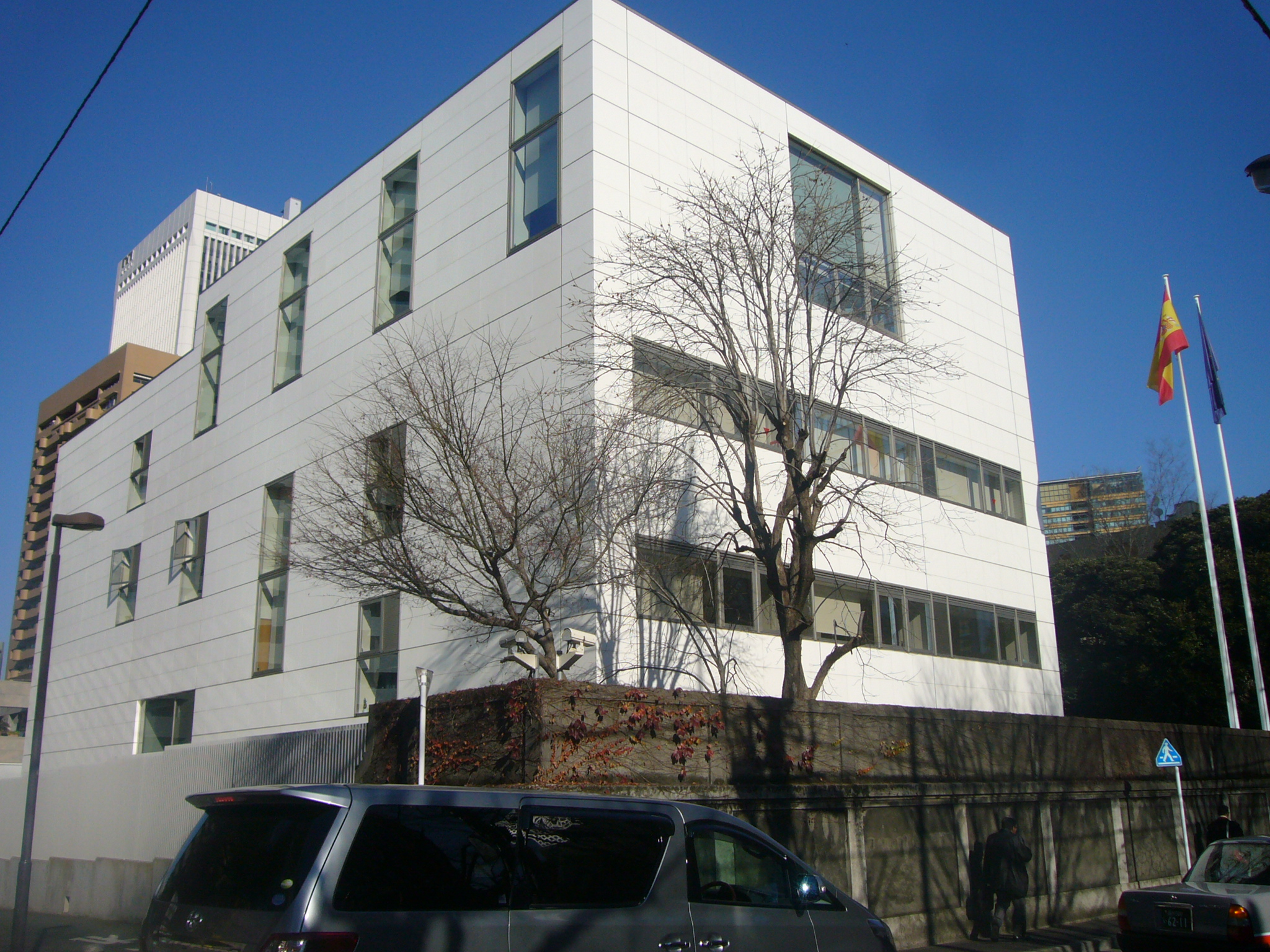
Embassy of Spain in Tokyo

== See also ==
- Colegio Japonés de Madrid
- Hidden Christians of Japan
- History of Roman Catholicism in Japan
- Japanese people in Spain
- Japanese School in Barcelona
- Kirishitan
- Medical School of Japan
- Nanban trade
- Los Japón, 2019 comedy film about a Spaniard who finds out he is the long-lost heir to the Japanese throne
