= Japanese School in Prague =

- プラハ日本人学校; Japonská škola v Praze

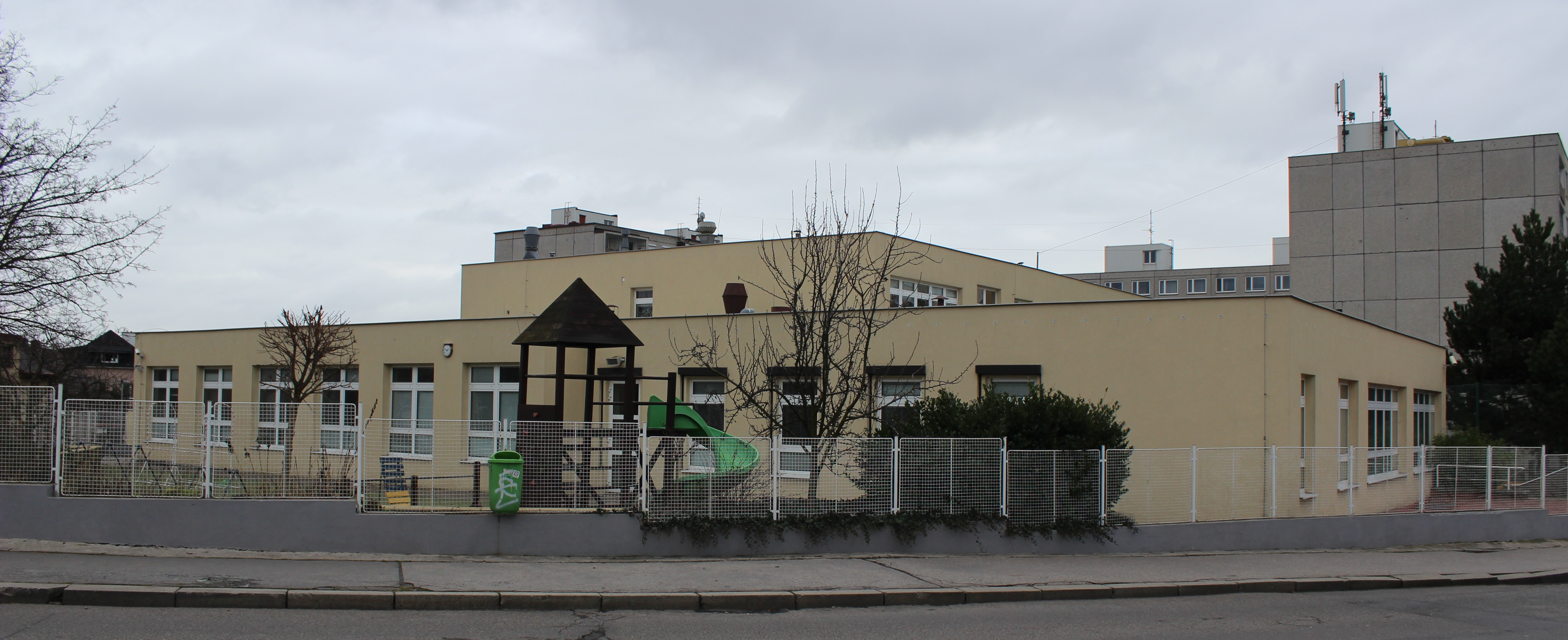
- Entrance

Location
- Skuteckeho 1388, 16300 Praha 6 Prague; Czech Republic; 50°4′9.98″N 14°18′42.37″E

Information
- Type: Japanese international school
- Established: 1980; 46 years ago
- Website: www.jpnschool.cz

The Japanese School in Prague (Czech: Japonská škola v Praze, プラハ日本人学校 Puraha Nihonjin Gakkō) is a Japanese international school in Řepy, District 6, Prague, Czech Republic. It is attached affiliated with the Embassy of Japan in Prague.

The school opened on April 28, 1980 (Showa 55), and it had its origins in an educational programme established in 1972. It was previously at Slunna 8.
