= Escuela Japonesa de Panamá =

- パナマ日本人学校

Location
- Calle Anastasio Ruiz Marbella Bella Vista, Panama; Panama City; Panama; 8.977958200000002°N 79.52020879999998°W

Information
- Type: 1-9 school
- Established: 1974
- Grades: 1-9
- Website: www.ejp1974.com

The Escuela Japonesa de Panamá ("Panama Japanese School"; パナマ日本人学校 Panama Nihonjin Gakkō) is a Japanese international school in the Marbella area, Bella Vista (ES), Panama City. It was established on October 12, 1974 (Shōwa 49).
