= Řepy =

- Cadastral area of Prague
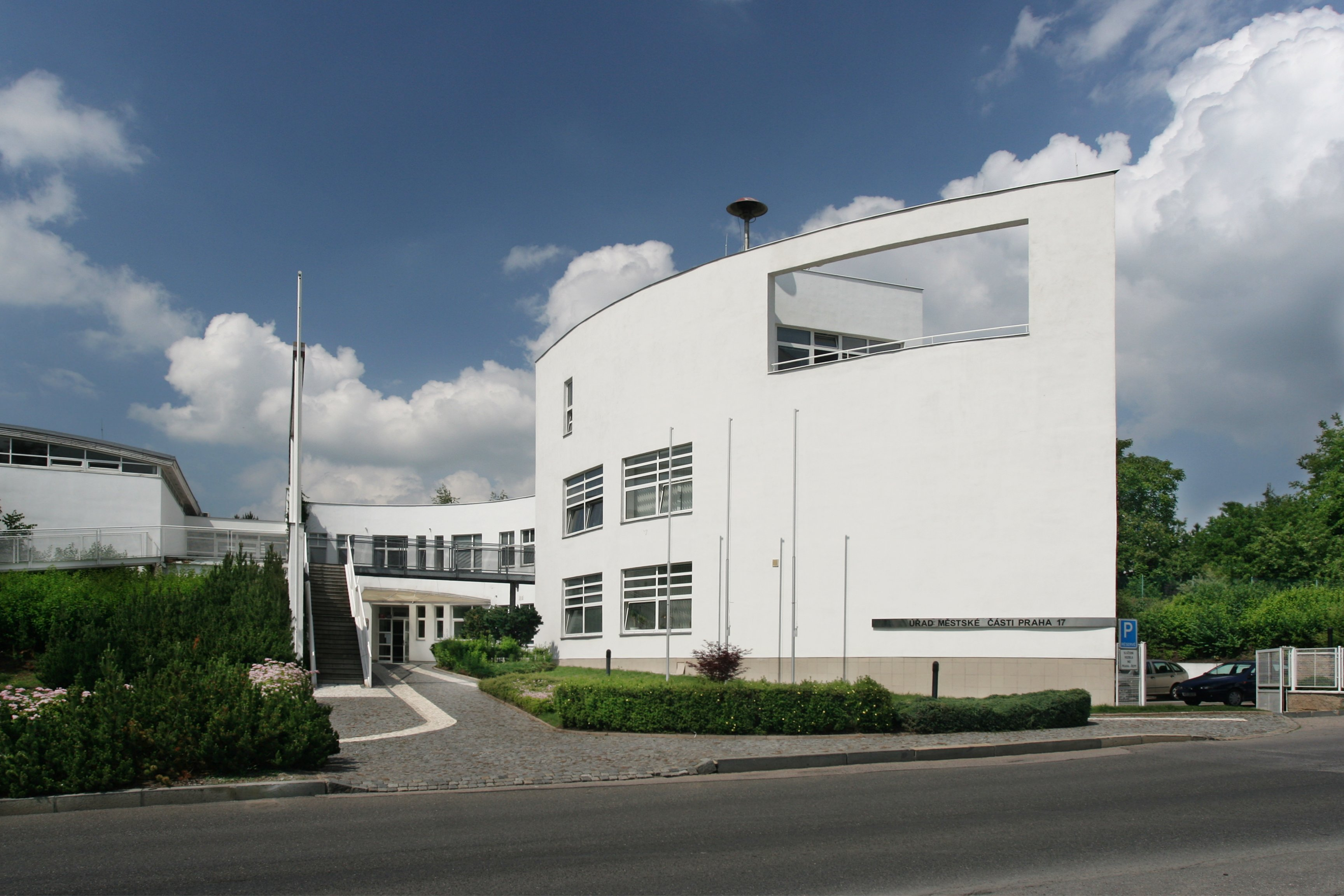
- Town hall of Prague 17

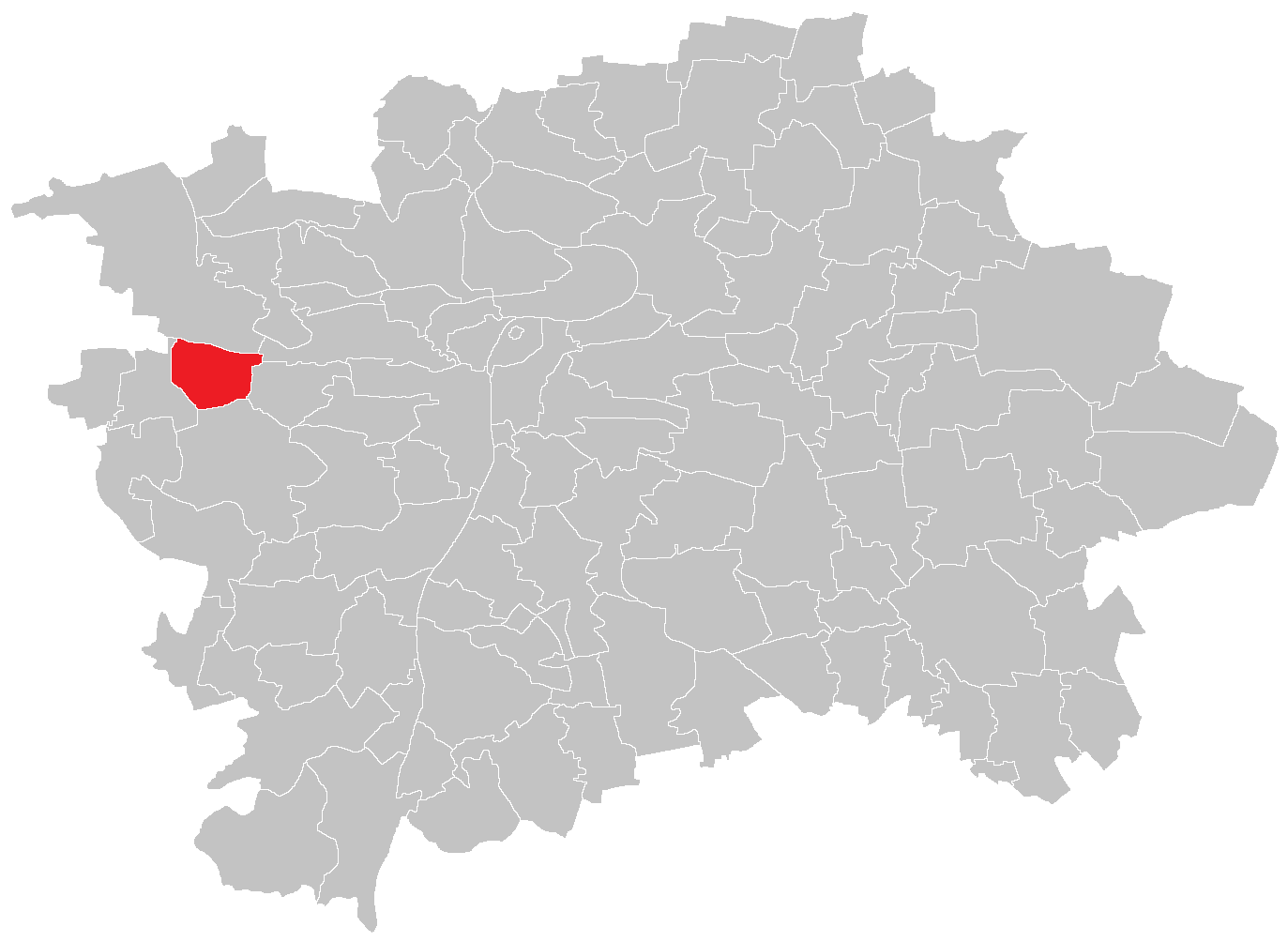
- Location of Řepy in Prague
- Coordinates: 50°4′8″N 14°18′13″E
- Country: Czech Republic
- City: Prague 6
- District: Prague 17
- Incorporated into Prague: 1968

Area
  - Total: 3.26 km^{2} (1.26 sq mi)

Population (2021)
  - Total: 22,461
  - Density: 6,890/km^{2} (17,800/sq mi)
- Postal code: 163 00

Řepy is a district in the west of Prague, located in and making up most of Prague 17 district, part of the Prague 6 administrative region.

== Education ==
The Japanese School of Prague is in the district.

== Demographics ==
Historical population

Year	Pop.	±%
1869	915	—
1880	1,185	+29.5%
1890	1,033	−12.8%
1900	934	−9.6%
1910	962	+3.0%
1921	1,078	+12.1%
1930	2,339	+117.0%
1950	3,430	+46.6%

Year	Pop.	±%
1961	3,387	−1.3%
1970	3,371	−0.5%
1980	2,959	−12.2%
1991	19,731	+566.8%
2001	23,252	+17.8%
2011	24,235	+4.2%
2021	22,461	−7.3%

Source: Censuses
