= Japanese International School in Vienna =

Japanische Internationale Schule in Wien
- ウィーン日本人学校

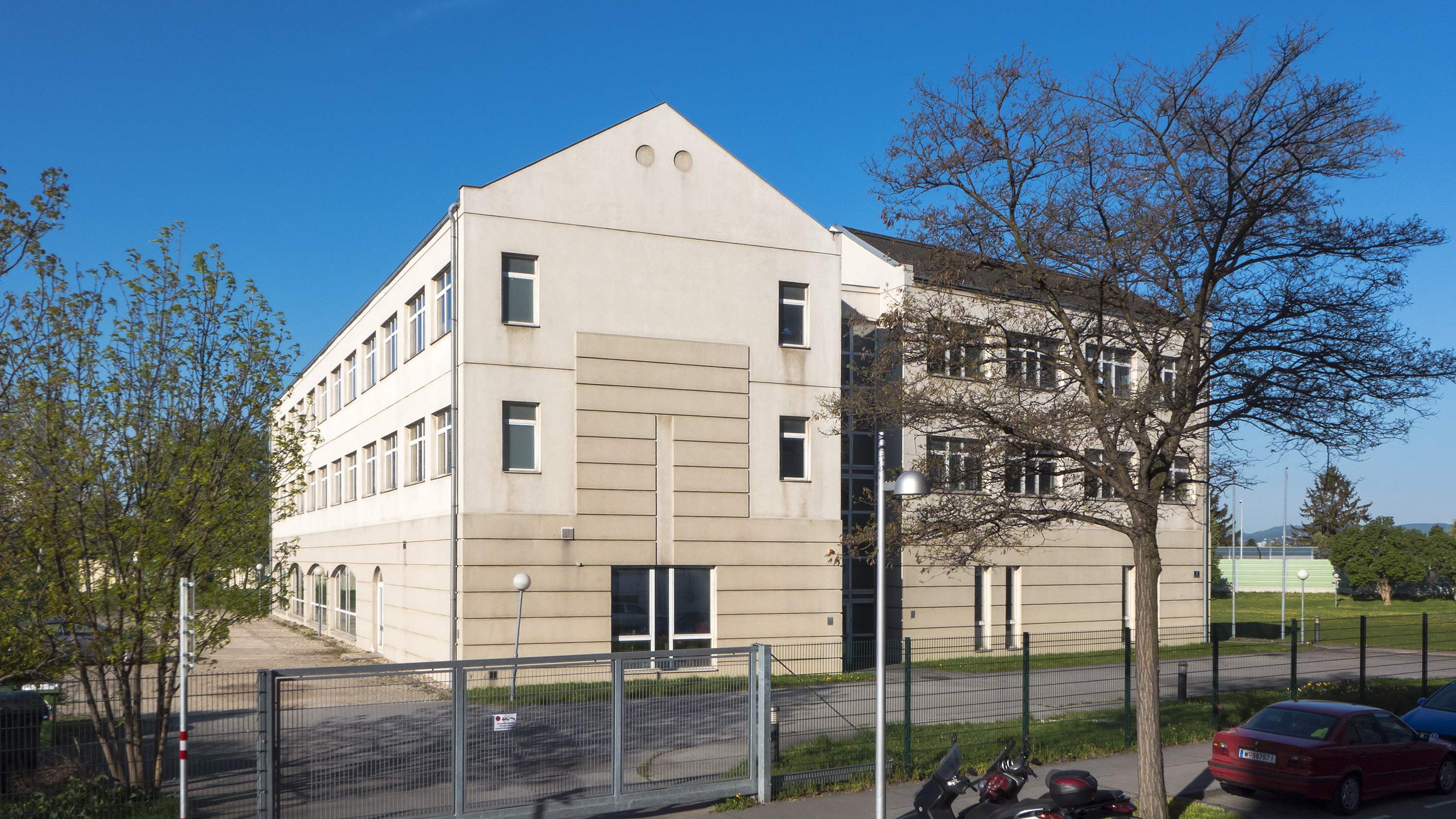

Location
- Prandaugasse 2 1220 Wien AUSTRIA; Vienna; Austria; 48.2464°N 16.4291°E

Information
- Type: Japanese international school
- Established: 1978; 48 years ago
- Website: japaneseschool.at

The Japanese International School in Vienna (ウィーン日本人学校, Wīn Nihonjin Gakkō; JSW; "Japanische Internationale Schule in Wien") is a Japanese international school in Donaustadt, Vienna, Austria. The school was established in 1978.
