= Prague 17 =

Prague 17 Praha 17
- Municipal District of Prague; Administrative District of Prague
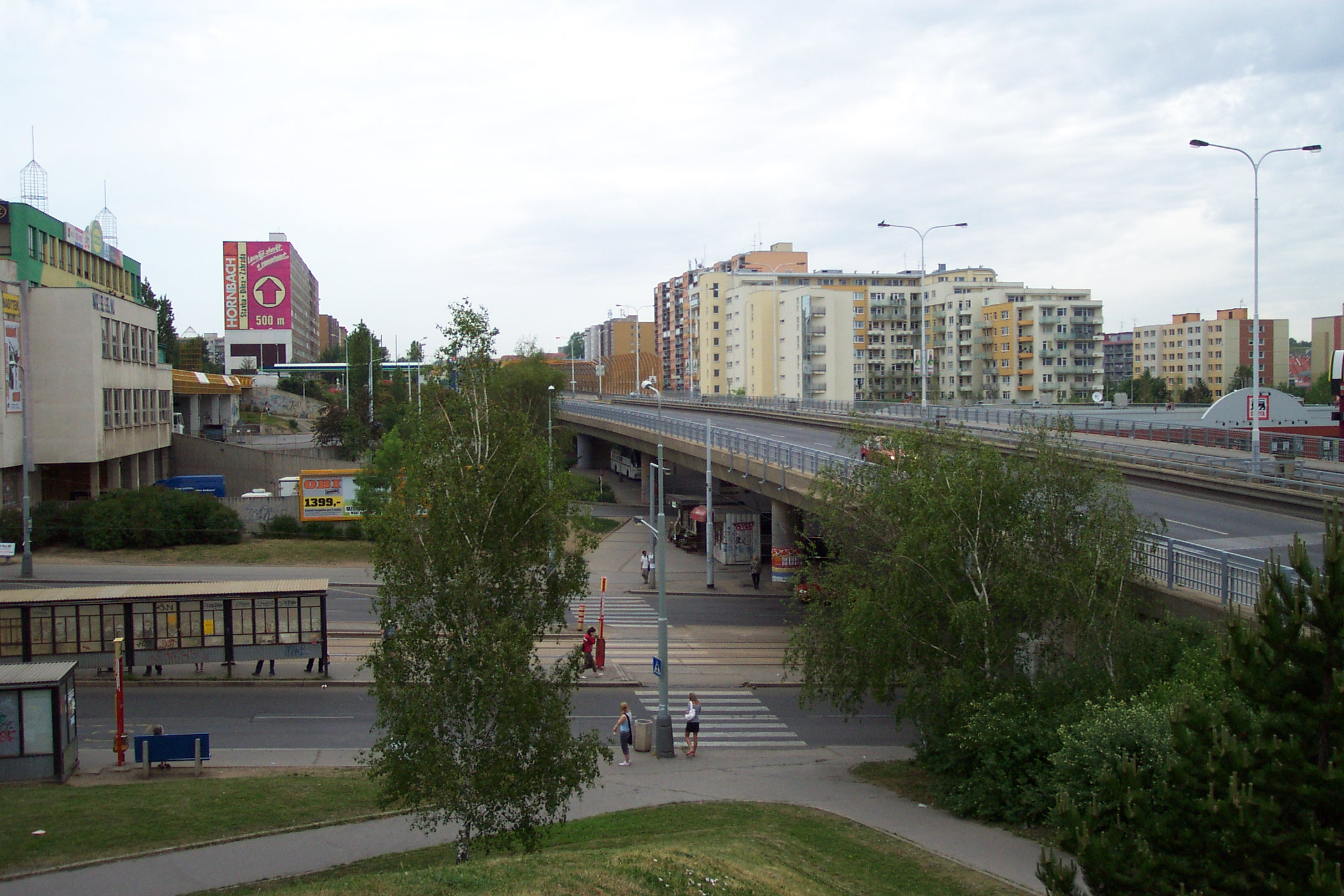
- Řepy, Slánská street

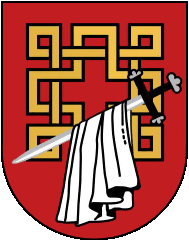
- Flag Coat of arms

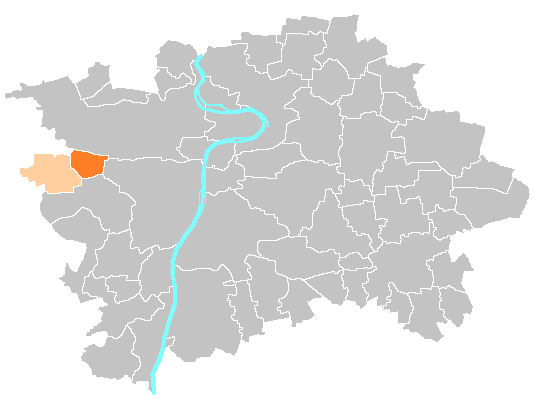
- Location of Prague 17 in Prague
- Coordinates: 50°4′22″N 14°18′27″E
- County: Czech Republic
- Region: Prague

Government
  - President: Alena Morakova

Area
  - Total: 3.26 km^{2} (1.26 sq mi)

Population (2021)
  - Total: 22,461
  - Density: 6,890/km^{2} (17,800/sq mi)
- Time zone: UTC+1 (CET)
  - Summer (DST): UTC+2 (CEST)
- Postal code: 163 00
- Website: repy.cz

Prague 17 is a municipal district of Prague, Czech Republic, located in the western part of the city. It is formed by the cadastre of Řepy. As of 2008, there were 25,365 inhabitants living in Prague 17.

The administrative district of the same name consists of the municipal districts Prague 17 and Zličín.

== Demographics ==
Historical population
Year	Pop.	±%
1869	915	—
1880	1,185	+29.5%
1890	1,033	−12.8%
1900	934	−9.6%
1910	962	+3.0%
1921	1,078	+12.1%
1930	2,339	+117.0%
1950	3,430	+46.6%
1961	3,387	−1.3%
1970	3,371	−0.5%
1980	2,959	−12.2%
1991	19,731	+566.8%
2001	23,252	+17.8%
2011	24,235	+4.2%
2021	22,461	−7.3%
Source: Censuses
