= Tehran Japanese School =

Coordinates: 35.7635177°N 51.41447560000006°E

- テヘラン日本人学校 مدرسه ژاپنی‌ها در تهران

Location
- 18 GHOBADIAN-WEST ST.AFRICHA AV.TEHRAN, IRAN

Information
- Established: June 8, 1968
- Website: tehranjpschool.com

The Tehran Japanese School (テヘラン日本人学校, Teheran Nihonjin Gakkō; Persian: مدرسه ژاپنی‌ها در تهران) is a Japanese international school located in Tehran, Iran, attached to the Japanese Embassy. It used to be located in another area of Tehran.

It serves primary school through junior high school.

It opened on June 8, 1968 (Shōwa 43).

In 2026, Takayuki Nishida (西田 隆之, Nishida Takayuki) was the principal. At the time the school had six teachers and seven students. Due to the 2026 Iran war, that year the students returned to Japan and had their graduation in Tokyo. The school was closed effective April 2026, which would be the start of the academic year in the Japanese schooling system. From 2024-2026, the school had four temporary closures due to political conflicts, with the March 2026 closure being the fourth time.
