= Japanese School in Warsaw =

The Japanese School in Warsaw
- ワルシャワ日本人学校; Szkoła Japońska w Warszawie

Location
- ul.Kormoranów 7A 02-865 Warszawa Poland; Warsaw; Poland; 52.135653°N 21.02251899999999°E

Information
- Type: Japanese international school
- Established: 1978; 48 years ago
- Website: www.japaneseschoolinwarsaw.com

Japanese School at the Japanese Embassy in Warsaw (在ポーランド日本国大使館付属ワルシャワ日本人学校 Zai Pōrando Nihonkoku Taishikan Fuzoku Warushawa Nihonjin Gakkō; Polish: Szkoła Japońska przy Ambasadzie Japonii w Warszawie), or The Japanese School in Warsaw, is a Japanese international school in Warsaw, Poland.
