= Japanese School in Barcelona =

- Colegio Japonés de Barcelona; Col·legi Japonès de Barcelona バルセロナ日本人学校

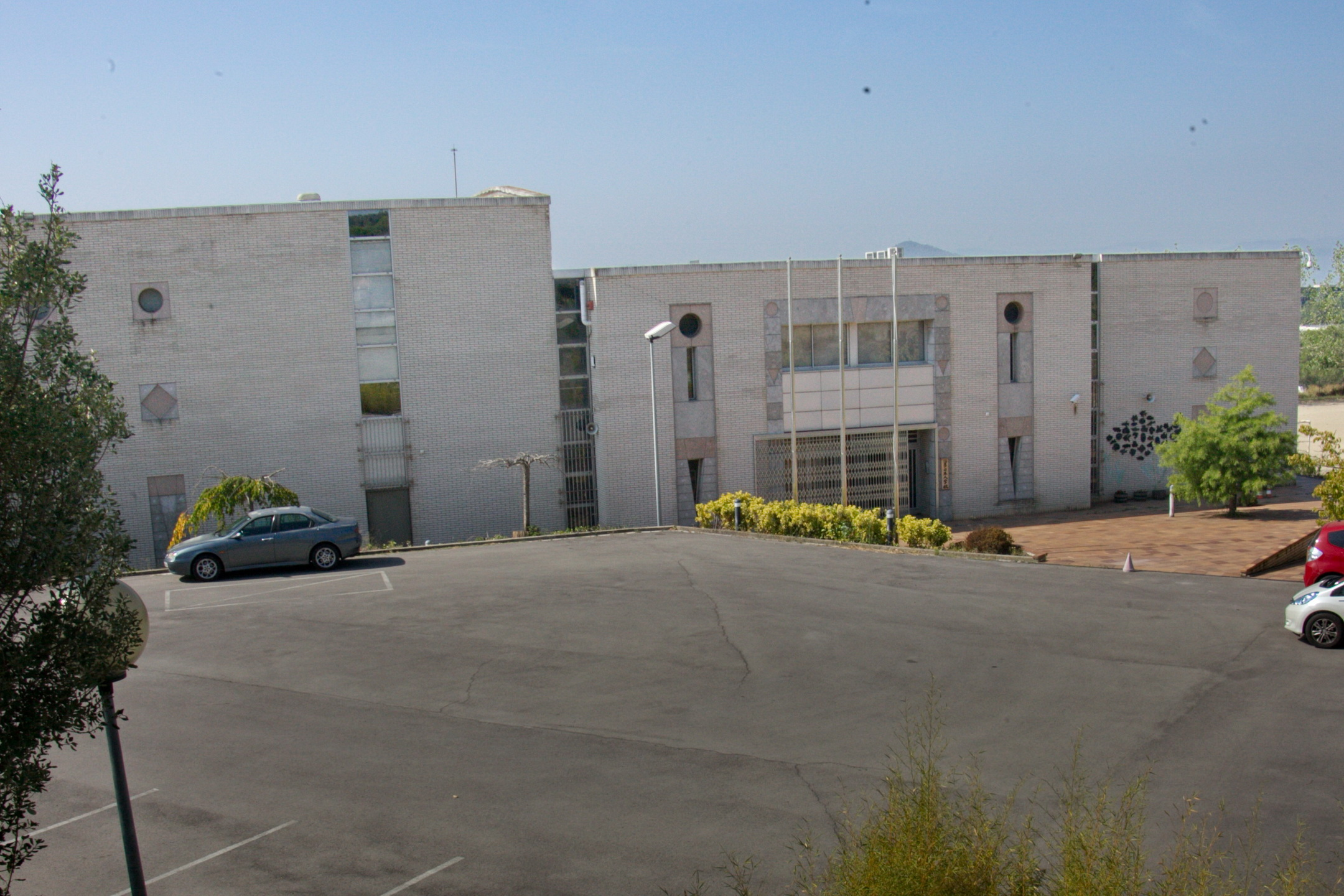
- School building

Location
- Can Graells 61, Sant Cugat del Valles, 08174; Spain; 41.49673°N 2.0626499999999623°E

Information
- Website: www.colegiojaponesbcn.org

The Japanese School in Barcelona (バルセロナ日本人学校, Baruserona Nihonjin Gakkō; Spanish: Colegio Japonés de Barcelona; Catalan: Col·legi Japonès de Barcelona) is a Japanese international school in Sant Cugat del Vallès, Catalonia, Spain, in Greater Barcelona. It is about 10 kilometres (6.2 mi) northeast of central Barcelona. Many Japanese families live along the school's bus route in northern Barcelona.

The Hoshuko Barcelona Educación Japonesa/Escuela de Educación Japonesa en Barcelona (バルセロナ補習校 Baruserona Hoshūkō), a weekend supplementary Japanese school, holds its classes in the Colegio Japonés de Barcelona building.

== Curriculum ==
The school uses Japanese as its language of instruction. Foreign language instruction is two hours per week and consists of the Spanish and English languages. Makiko Fukuda (福田 牧子, Fukuda Makiko), a professor at the Autonomous University of Barcelona and the author of Els usos lingüístics dels nens japonesos i nipocatalans/nipocastellans escolaritzats a Catalunya: el cas de l’alumnat de l’escola complementària de llengua japonesa i del col·legi japonès de Barcelona, stated that many students do not make sufficient progress in their foreign language instruction because they primarily have relations with other Japanese, have little motivation to learn the area language since they understand they will only be temporarily in Barcelona, and because of the few hours per week of foreign language instruction. Most CJB students have trivial amounts of Catalan language instruction for festivals and other symbolic reasons. Some of the part-Japanese students take a special Catalan class.

== Student body ==
Alternative view of the building

As of 2012, there were 60 students at the school. As of 2009, most students are children of temporary Japanese workers. Norio Sudo, the consul general of Japan in Barcelona, said that these parents are managers of Japanese companies. Some students are part-Japanese. The students range in age from five years old to 15 years old.

== See also ==
- Japan–Spain relations
- Japanese people in Spain
- Colegio Japonés de Madrid
