= Japanese School in Abu Dhabi =

Japanese international school in Abu Dhabi

Coordinates: 24.4568011°N 54.34297019999997°E

- アブダビ日本人学校 المدرسة اليابانية في أبوظبي

Location
- King Abdullah Bin Abdulaziz Al Saud St - Abu Dhabi - United Arab Emirates

Information
- Type: April 15, 1978 (certified January 24, 1995)
- Website: en.jsadedu.com

The Japanese School in Abu Dhabi (JSAD) (アブダビ日本人学校, Abu Dabi Nihonjin Gakkō; Arabic: المدرسة اليابانية في أبوظبي) is a Japanese international school located in Abu Dhabi. It is located in the former Umm Habiba Girls School. It is adjacent to the Lycée Français Théodore Monod (LfTM), the French international school.
