= CJM Fiscal Management =

US wealth management firm

- Founded: 2003
- Founder: Charles Massimo
- Headquarters: Melville, New York

CJM Fiscal Management is a wealth management firm located in Melville, New York.

== History ==
The firm was found in 2003, by its president Charles Massimo. Massimo is known for his involvement with autism support groups. He is also the founder of Legacy of Love, a comprehensive planning resource for families affected by autism, which operates as a division of CJM Fiscal Management.

As of September 2007, the firm has three employees and annual revenues of $1 million. It also has a psychologist to establish a proper way for its clients to communicate with their children in order to prevent the children from becoming complacent due to the knowledge of their parents' wealth.

As of 2009, CJM Fiscal Management oversees about $200 million in client assets and is considered as one of the top wealth management firms in Long Island. It provides wealth management and investment strategies for individuals, families and companies. It also holds regular seminars to help educate business owners with 401(k) planning and compliance.
