= Colegio Japonés de Las Palmas =

Japanese international school in Las Palmas de Gran Canaria

- ラス・パルマス日本人学校

Location
- Carretera Del Centro 47, Tafira Alta, Las Palmas de Gran Canaria, Espana; Spain
- Coordinates: 28.0954394°N 15.423389499999985°W

Information
- Type: Japanese International school
- Established: 1973
- Closed: 2001
- Website: Colegio Japonés de Las Palmas at the Wayback Machine (archive index)

Colegio Japonés de Las Palmas (ラス・パルマス日本人学校, Rasu Parumasu Nihonjin Gakkō) was a Japanese international school in Tafira Alta, Las Palmas de Gran Canaria, Spain.

== History ==
It opened in October 1973, making it the first Japanese school in Spain and the third-oldest in Europe if the Canary Islands are counted as being in Europe. A Japanese teacher arrived to the island as it opened. The school served members of the Japanese community involved in the fishing industry. Due to regulations, the business decreased in size, and accordingly the school decreased in size.

In 2001, the Japanese fleet was moved from Las Palmas, leading to a reduction in the area's Japanese community. The number of students fell below the minimum number supported by the Japanese government. It was closed in March 2001, and was replaced by the Escuela Complementaria Japonesa de Las Palmas (ラスパルマス日本語学校), a part-time school. The decline of the Japanese community of Las Palmas led many institutions catering to the Japanese community, including the day school, to close. The closure of the day school resulted in the demise of the island's Japanese cultural exchange programme.
