= Scuola Giapponese di Milano =

- ミラノ日本人学校

Location
- Via Arzaga 10, 20146; Milan; Italy; 45.4566351°N 9.138034000000061°E

Information
- Type: Japanese international school
- Opened: 25 February 1976
- Website: mngitalia.net

The Scuola Giapponese di Milano (ミラノ日本人学校, Mirano Nihonjin Gakkō; English: "Japanese School of Milan") is a Japanese international school in Milan, Italy.

The school is within a two-story white building. Francesco Segoni of the publication Magazine of the Università Cattolica del Sacro Cuore argued that the school building looks more like a country house than an educational building.

As of April 2022, the school had 63 students. Almost all of the students have parents working for Japanese multinational companies who had been transferred to Milan. It uses the public educational system of Japan, and is classified as a private school in Italy.

The school was founded on 25 February 1976. In 1990 it had 18 teachers, with one being the Italian teacher, and the other 17 being Japanese people. At that time, 140 companies with Milan area offices, all from Japan, helped finance the school.
