= Shanghai Japanese School =

Japanese international school in Shanghai, China

- 上海日本人学校

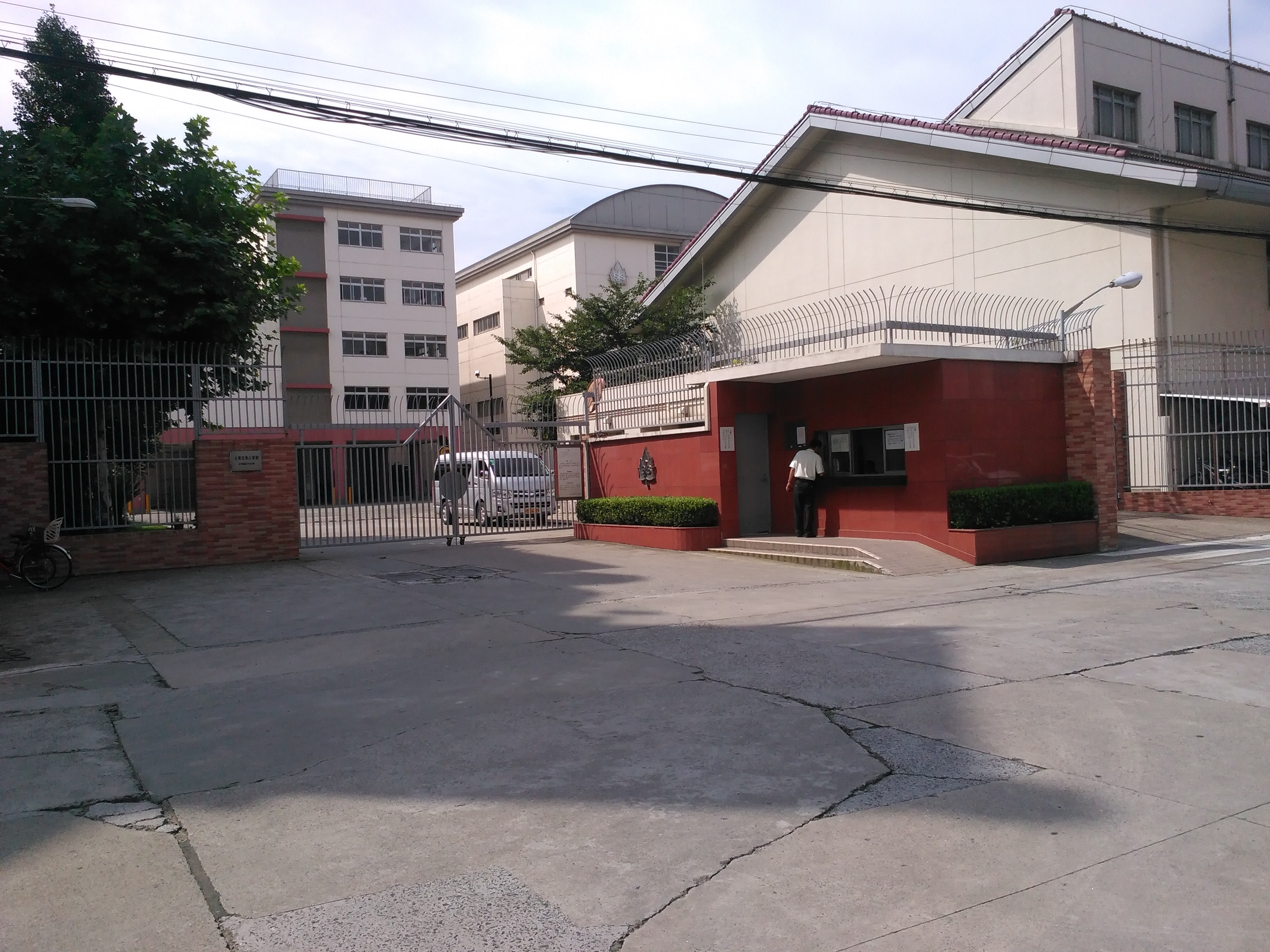
- Shanghai Japanese School Hongqiao Campus

Location
- Hongqiao: 3185 Hongmei Road, Minhang District, Shanghai 201103 〒201103 上海市閔行区虹梅路3185号 上海市闵行区虹梅路3185号 201103; Pudong: 277 Jinkang Road, Pudong New District, Shanghai, 200127 〒200127 上海市浦東新区錦康路277号 上海市浦东新区锦康路277号 200127

Information
- Website: srx2.net.cn

Shanghai Japanese School

Chinese name
- Simplified Chinese: 上海日本人外籍人员子女学校
- Traditional Chinese: 上海日本人外籍人員子女學校
- Literal meaning: Shanghai Japan Person Foreign Personnel Children School
Transcriptions
Standard Mandarin
- Hanyu Pinyin: Shànghǎi Rìběnrén Wàijí Rényuán Zǐnǚ Xuéxiào

Alternative Chinese name
- Simplified Chinese: 上海日本人学校
- Traditional Chinese: 上海日本人學校
- Literal meaning: Shanghai Japan People School
Transcriptions
Standard Mandarin
- Hanyu Pinyin: Shànghǎi Rìběnrén Xuéxiào

Japanese name
- Kanji: 上海日本人学校
Transcriptions
- Romanization: Shanhai Nihonjin Gakkō

The Shanghai Japanese School (SJS) is a Japanese international school serving primary and junior high school levels in Shanghai. It has two campuses, one in Hongqiao and one in Pudong. The school's teachers are Japanese citizens. The school also has a senior high school component.

As of 2020 the principal of the Pudong campus is Naoto Sashida(?) (佐次田 直人, Sashida Naoto)(?), and the principal of the Hongqiao campus is Kenji Fujihara (藤原 鎌次, Fujihara Kenji).

== History ==
In April 1987, the school was founded as The Japanese Government General Consulate of Shanghai, Shanghai Japanese School. The school has since changed its name to the current Shanghai Japanese School.

The high school opened in 2011 (Heisei 23).

== Campuses ==
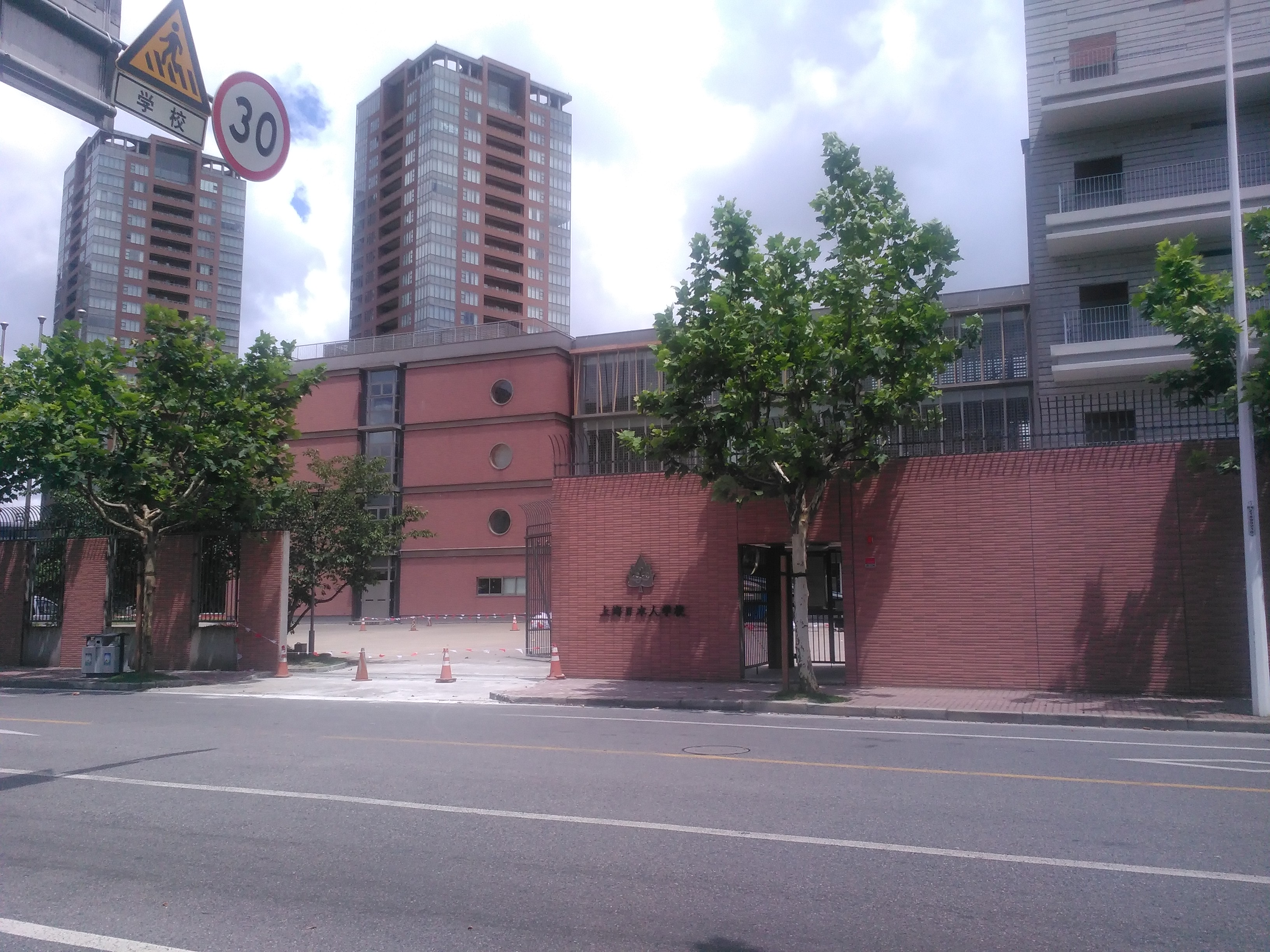
Pudong Campus

The Pudong campus (Japanese and Traditional Chinese: 浦東校, Simplified Chinese: 浦东校, Hepburn: Hotō/Pūton Kō, Pinyin: Pǔdōng Xiào), with 4,643 square metres (49,980 sq ft) of space, has 71 teachers and serves 1,079 students in the elementary and junior high school levels. The Hongqiao campus (Japanese and Traditional Chinese: 虹橋校, Simplified Chinese: 虹桥校, Hepburn: Honchao Kō, Pinyin: Hóngqiáo Xiào) in Minhang District, with 8,727 square metres (93,940 sq ft) of space, has 61 teachers and 1,340 students in elementary school. The SJS Senior High School is located on the Pudong campus.

Campuses

== See also ==
- Japanese community of Shanghai

Mainland China-aligned Chinese international schools in Japan:

- Kobe Chinese School
- Yokohama Yamate Chinese School
