= The Budapest Japanese School =

- ブダペスト日本人学校; Budapesti Japán Iskola

- Front door

Location
- 1125 Budapest Virányos út 48 (in Virányos Iskola); Budapest; Hungary; 47.5161019°N 18.990904999999998°E

Information
- Type: Japanese international school
- Opened: 2005
- Grades: Elementary School (Grades 1-6), Junior High School (Grades 1-3)
- Enrollment: Students with Japanese nationality
- Campus size: ≈11,500m² (Virányos Iskola) ≈350m²(Building)
- Website: sites.google.com/bpjpschool.hu/bpjp (Current) bpjpschool.hu (Discontinued)

The Budapest Japanese School (BJS; 在ハンガリー日本国大使館付属ブダペスト日本人学校 Zai Hangarī Nihon-koku Taishikan Fuzoku Budapesuto Nihonjin Gakkō; Hungarian: Budapesti Japán Iskola) is a Japanese international school operating in an auxiliary building of Virányos Iskola, a Hungarian-language elementary school in Budapest, Hungary. It serves as an elementary and junior high school, and it is affiliated with the Embassy of Japan in Budapest.

Interior view of the school

As of 2005 there were going to be around six students.
