= Islamabad Japanese School =

- イスラマバード日本人学校

Location
- Road No.20, Diplomatic Enclave; Islamabad, 44000; Pakistan; 33°43′27″N 73°06′41″E

Information
- Established: 1985; 41 years ago
- Website: ijs.net.pk

The Islamabad Japanese School attached to the Embassy of Japan in Pakistan (IJS) (在パキスタン日本国大使館附属イスラマバード日本人学校, Zai Pakisutan Nihon-koku Taishikan fuzoku Isuramabādo Nihonjin Gakkō) is a Japanese international school in the Diplomatic Enclave in Islamabad. It is opposite to the British High Commission.

It was established in 1985.

== See also ==
- Japanese people in Pakistan
