= Colegio Japonés de Madrid =

- マドリッド日本人学校

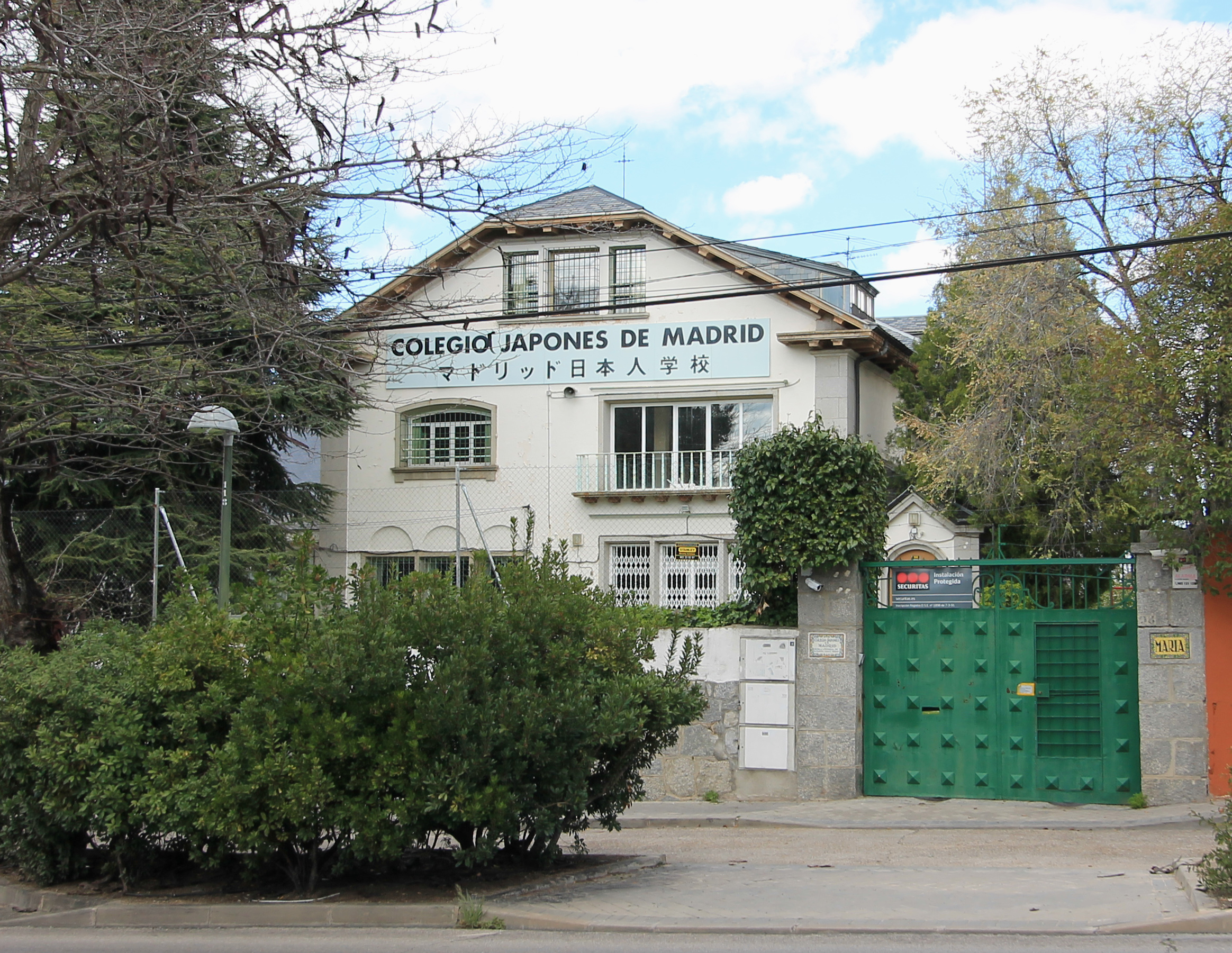

Location
- Avda. de la Victoria, 98, El Plantio 28023 Madrid Spain; Madrid; Spain; 40.4727916°N 3.8296338000000105°W

Information
- Type: Japanese international school
- Established: 1 September 1981
- Website: cjmspain.com

The Colegio Japonés de Madrid (CJM) (マドリッド日本人学校, Madoriddo Nihonjin Gakkō; Spanish: "Japanese College of Madrid") is a Japanese international school in the El Plantío area of Moncloa-Aravaca, Madrid, in the city's northwestern portion. Many Japanese families, particularly those with children, live in northwest Madrid, in proximity to the school. It was established on 1 September 1981 (Shōwa 56).

The Escuela Complementaria Japonesa de Madrid (ECJ; マドリッド補習授業校 Madoriddo Hoshū Jugyō Kō), a Japanese supplementary school, is a part of the CJM. The ECJ was merged into the Madrid Japanese School in April 1996 (Heisei Year 8).

As of 2011 the day school had fewer than 30 students, and as of 2012 it had 28 students. It gives progress evaluations to students, ranked 1 through 5, taking into account the students' maturity levels. It does not use suspensions or recoveries. Students who are higher performing help those who need assistance.

== See also ==
- Japan–Spain relations
- Japanese people in Spain
- Japanese School in Barcelona
