= Yangon Japanese School =

- ヤンゴン日本人学校

Location
- No. 1, Thantaman Road, Dagon T/S, Yangon, MYANMAR; 16.7866182°N 96.139717°E

Information
- Established: 1989; 37 years ago
- Website: www.yjs-ed.com

The Yangon Japanese School (YJS) (ヤンゴン日本人学校, Yangon Nihonjin Gakkō), previously the Rangoon Japanese School (ラングーン日本人学校, Rangūn Nihonjin Gakkō), is a Japanese international school in Dagon Township, Yangon, Burma. It is affiliated with the Embassy of Japan in Myanmar.

The school adopted its current name on September 22, 1989 (Heisei 1).
