= Nihonjin gakkō =

School outside of Japan run by the Japanese government

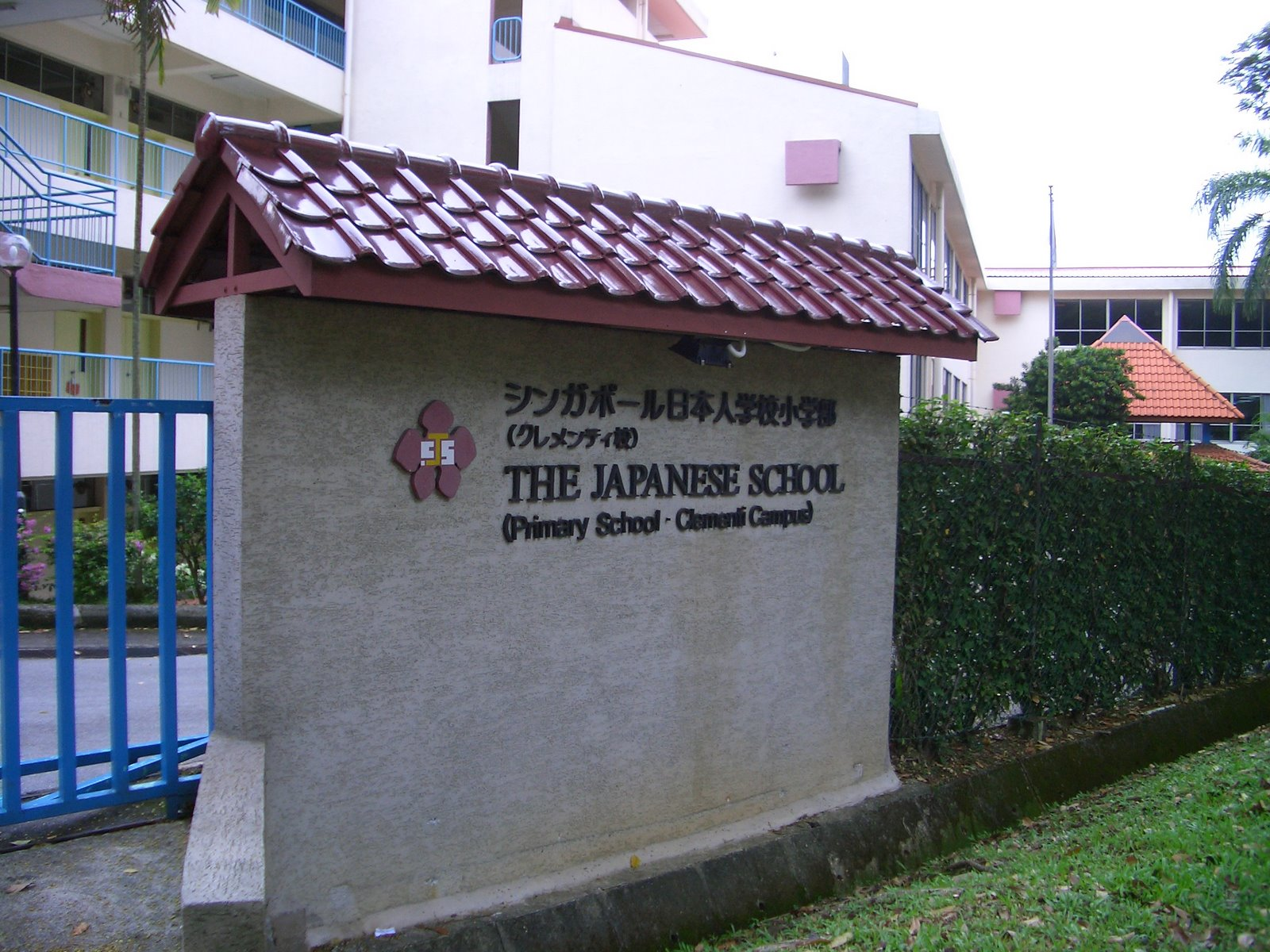
The Japanese School Singapore Primary School Clementi Campus, Singapore; as of 2013 this is the largest overseas Japanese school in the world.

Nihonjin gakkō (日本人学校; lit. Japanese people school), also called Japanese school, is a full-day school outside Japan intended primarily for Japanese citizens living abroad. It is an expatriate school designed for children whose parents are working on diplomatic, business, or education missions overseas and have plans to repatriate to Japan.

The schools offer exactly the same curriculum used in public elementary and junior high schools in Japan, so when the students go back to Japan, they will not fall behind in the class. Some schools accept Japanese citizens only; others welcome Japanese-speaking students regardless of citizenship.

They are accredited by Japan's Ministry of education and science and receive funding from the Japanese government. There were 85 schools worldwide as of April 2006, and all of these schools provide English classes in the primary education.

Every school hires teachers from Japan on a two- to three-year assignment, but they also hire people from the local community as Japanese-speaking teachers, English and other language instructors, administrative assistants, gardeners, janitors and security guards.

Nihonjin gakkō serve elementary school and junior high school. One nihonjin gakkō, Shanghai Japanese School, has a senior high school program.

Schools that partially offer the nihonjin gakkō's curriculum after school hours or on weekends are sometimes called Japanese schools, too, but strictly speaking they are categorized as hoshū jugyō kō or hoshūkō, a supplementary school. Overseas Japanese schools operated by private educational institutions are not classified as nihonjin gakkō, but instead as Shiritsu zaigai kyōiku shisetsu.

== History ==
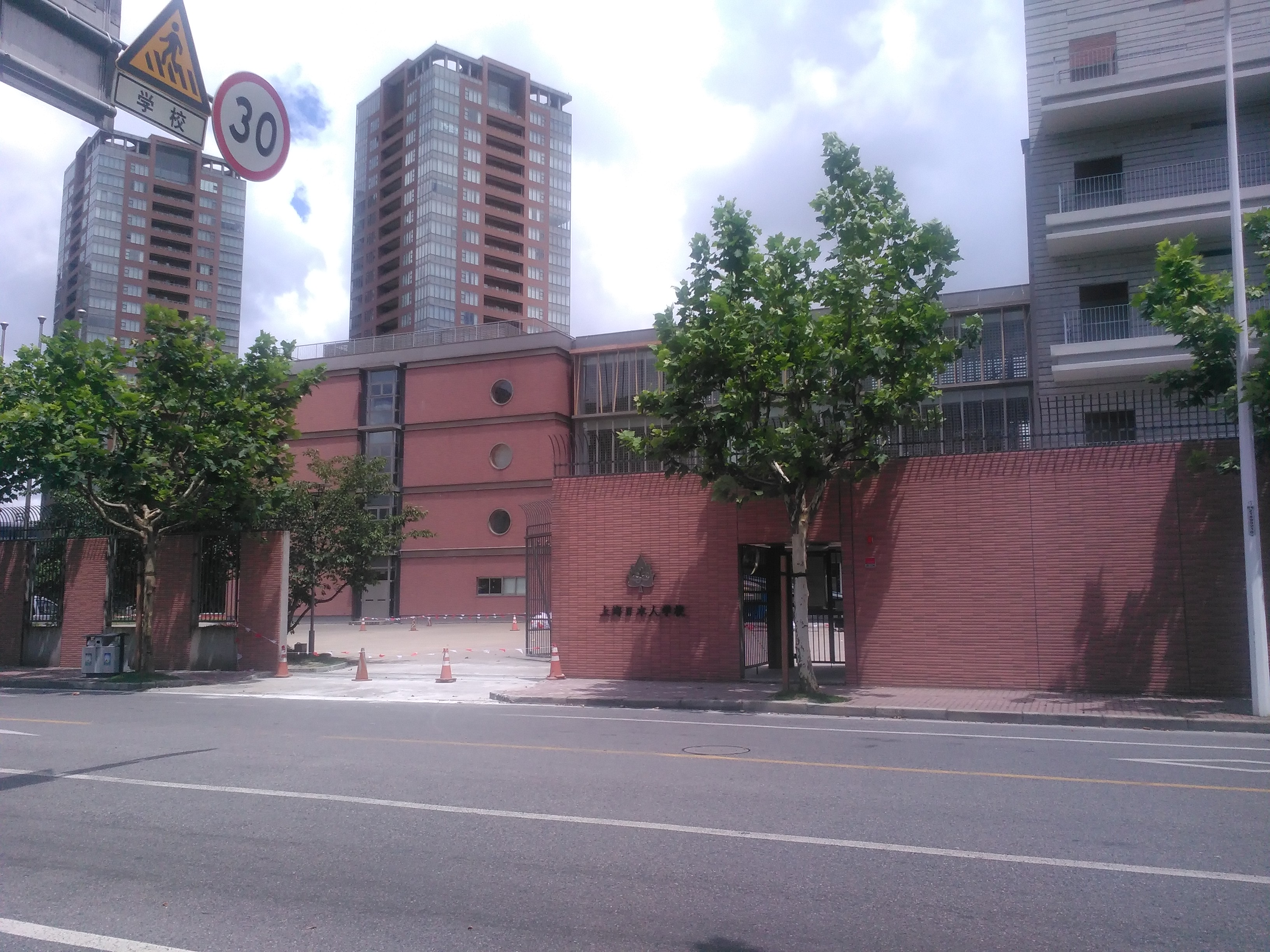
The Shanghai Japanese School (Pudong Campus pictured) is the only nihonjin gakkō in the world that offers senior high school classes.

Some of the nihonjin gakkō in Asia have a long history, originally established as public schools in the Japan-occupied territories in Thailand, Philippines, and Taiwan.

As Japan recovered after World War II, increased numbers of Japanese international schools serving elementary and junior high school levels opened around the world. The first postwar Japanese overseas school was the Japanese School of Bangkok, which opened in 1956.

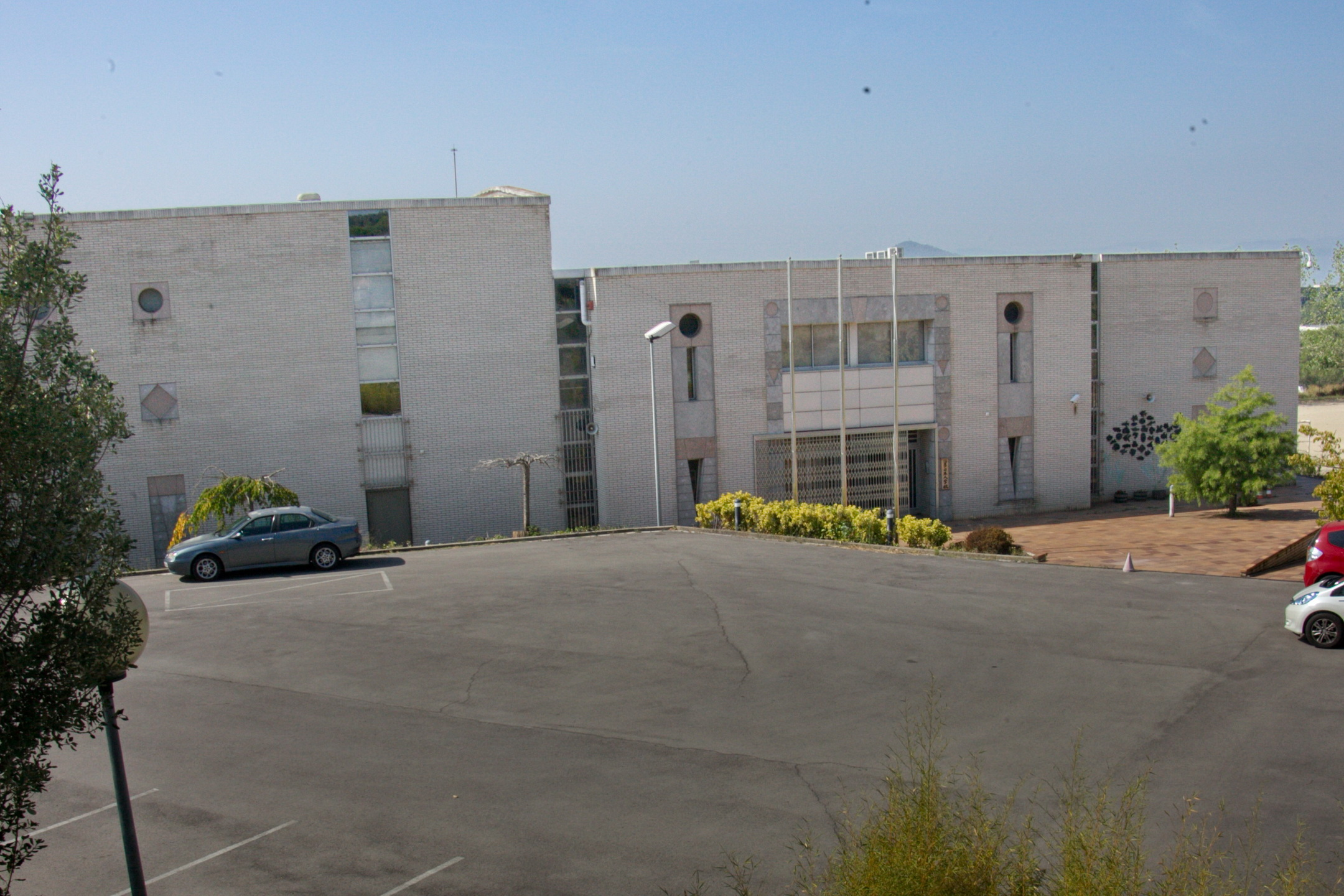
Japanese School in Barcelona

The Ministry of Education of Japan, as of 1985, encouraged the development of nihonjin gakkō, in developing countries, while it encouraged the opening of hoshū jugyō kō, or part-time supplementary schools, in developed countries. However, some Japanese parents in developed countries, in addition to those in developing countries, campaigned for the opening of nihonjin gakkō in developed countries due to concern about the education of their children.

In 1971, there were 22 nihonjin gakkō worldwide. During the postwar rapid economic growth in the 1950s to early 1970s and the Japanese asset price bubble in the 1980s, the country gained economic power and many sogo shoshas and major industries sent their employees all over the world. That was when many nihonjin gakko were established to educate their children in Asia, Europe, Middle East, North, Central and South America. The number of nihonjin gakkō increased to 80 in 1986 with the opening of Japanese schools in Barcelona and Melbourne. As of May of that year 968 teachers from Japan were teaching at these Japanese schools worldwide. That month 15,811 students were enrolled in those schools. The number of nihonjin gakkō increased to 82 by 1987.

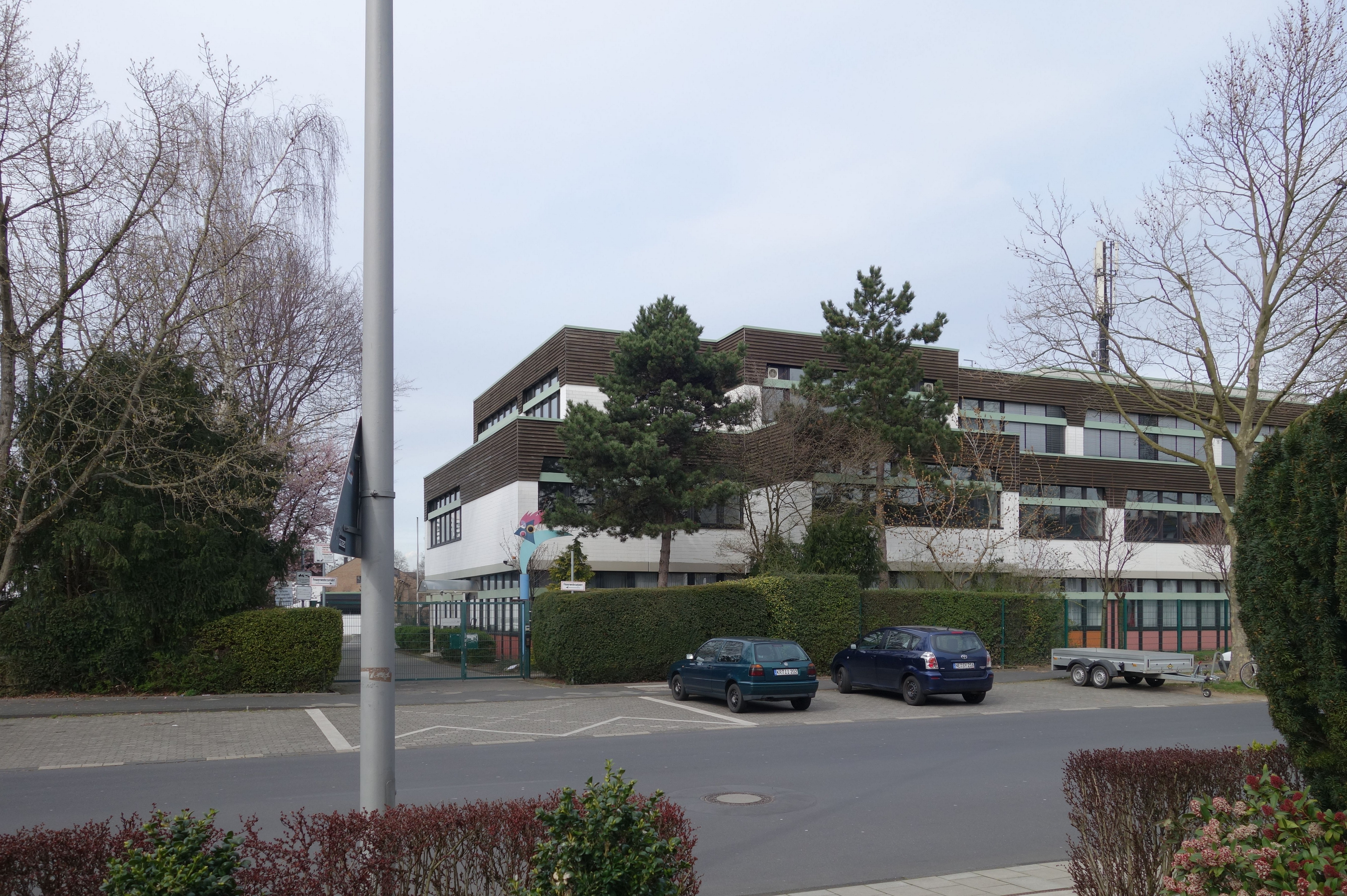
Japanische Internationale Schule in Düsseldorf

In the early 1980s, 40% of Japanese national children living in Europe attended nihonjin gakkō, while almost 95% of Japanese national children living abroad in Asia attended nihonjin gakkō.

Many Japanese parents abroad sent their children to Japan to attend high school after they completed the junior high school abroad, or leaving the children behind, so they could become accustomed to the difficult Japanese university entrance systems. Toshio Iwasaki, the editor of the Journal of Japanese Trade & Industry, stated that this reason inhibited the development of Japanese senior high schools in other countries. The first overseas international schools that served the senior high school level were the Rikkyo School in England, gaining senior high school level classes after 1975, and the Lycée Seijo in France, which opened in 1986. By 1991, Japanese international senior high schools were in operation in the United States, France, the United Kingdom, Singapore, Germany, Denmark, and Ireland.

By 1991 many overseas Japanese high schools were accepting students who were resident in Japan, and some wealthier families in Japan chose to send their children to Japanese schools abroad instead of Japanese schools in Japan.

While Japan was experiencing a major recession called the Lost Decade in the 1990s, so were nihonjin gakkō. Many of them were closed due to a dramatic decrease in enrollment.

China has been an exception to this trend, experiencing growth in educational institutions alongside its economic development. Schools in Beijing, Shanghai and Hong Kong have expanded, while new schools have been established in Dalian, Guangzhou, Tianjin, Qingdao and Suzhou since 1991.

By 2004, there were 83 Japanese day schools in 50 countries.

== Characteristics ==
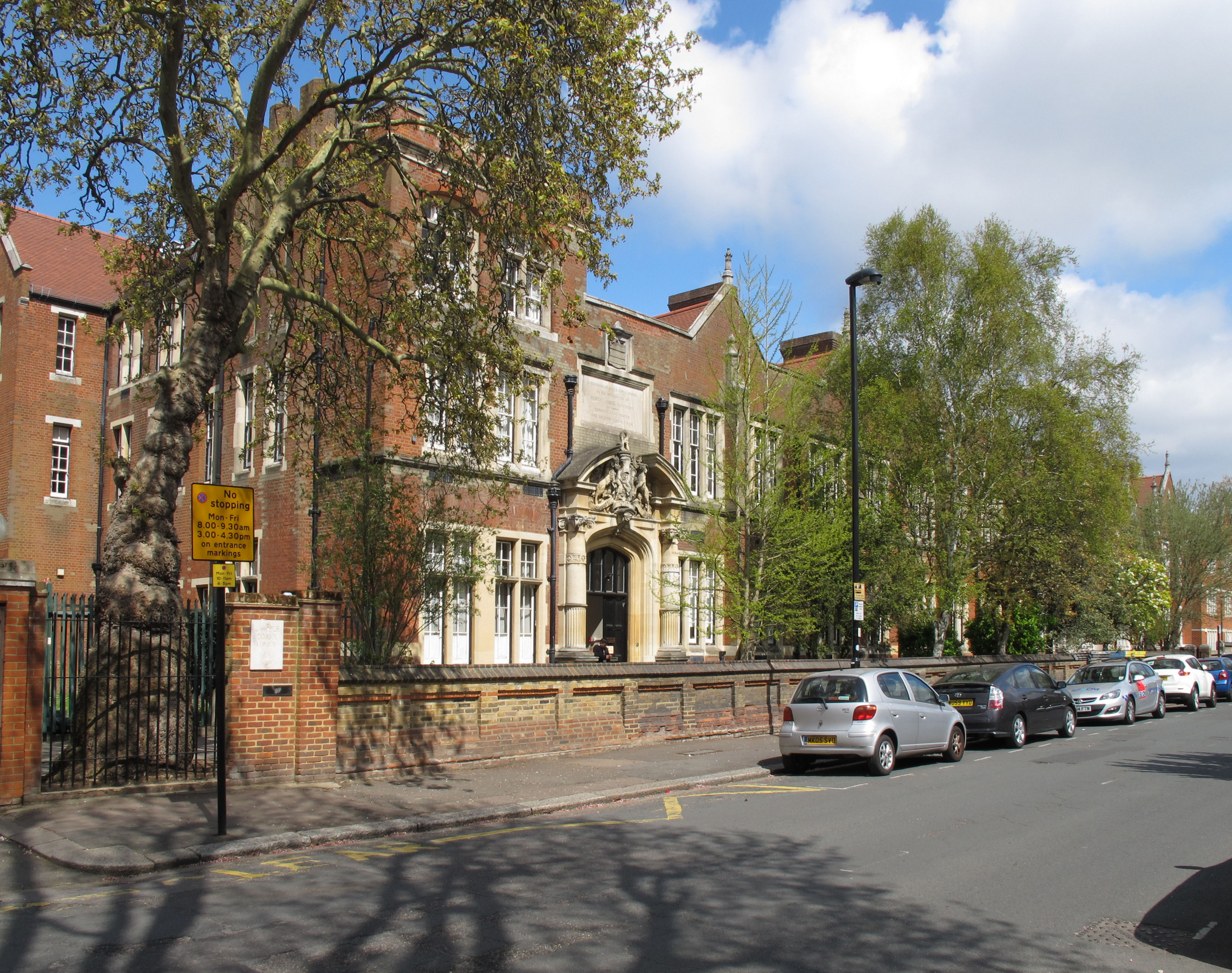
Japanese School in London

Nihonjin gakkō use Japanese as their language of instruction. The curriculum is approved by the Japanese Ministry of Education, Culture, Sports, Science and Technology (MEXT) so that students may easily adjust upon returning to Japan. For foreign language classes, each school usually teaches English and, if different, a major local language of the country. Most nihonjin gakkō do not admit people lacking Japanese citizenship. This practice differs from those of American and British international schools, which do admit students of other nationalities. Nihonjin gakkō usually use the Japanese academic calendar instead of those of their host countries.

== Tendencies ==
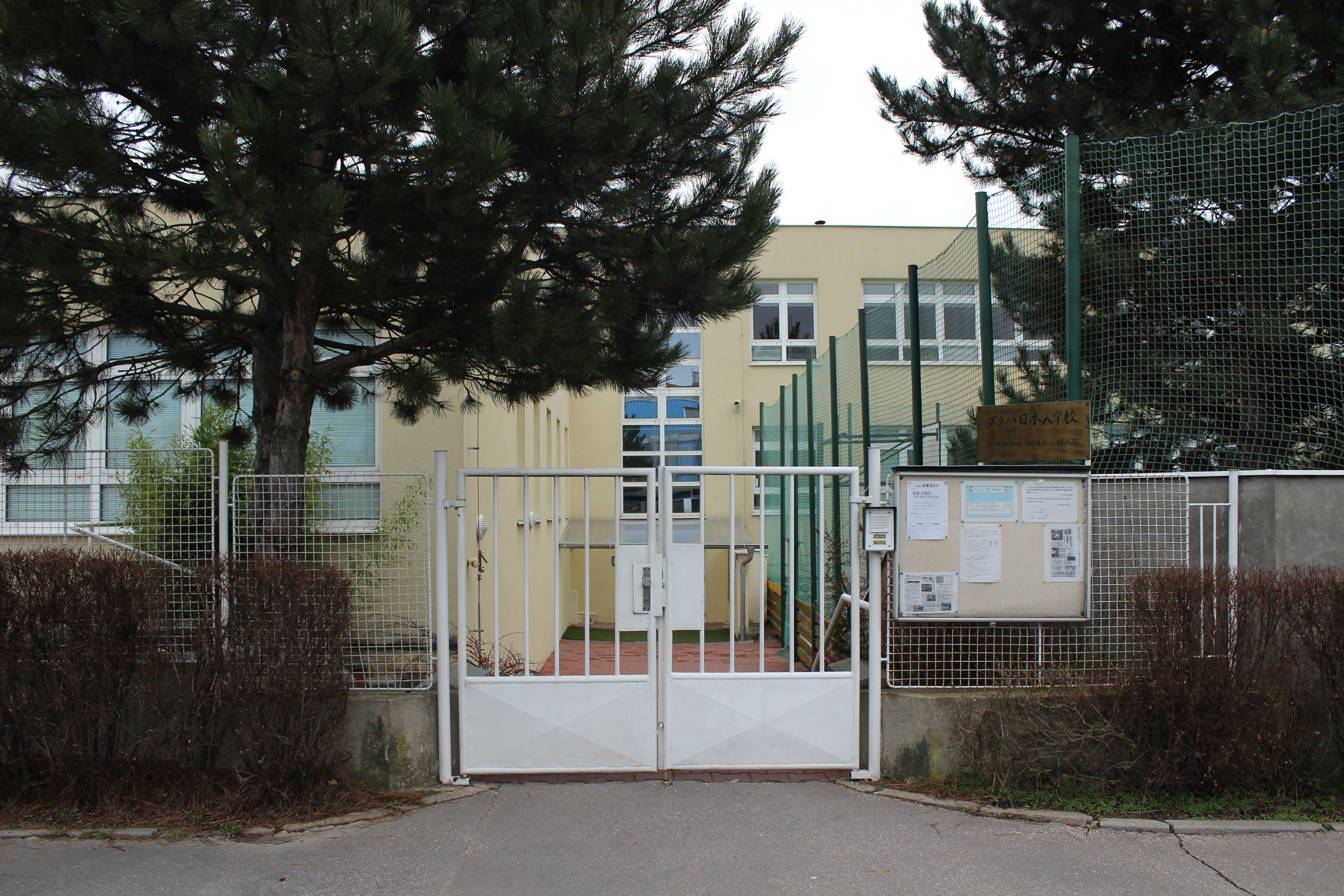
The Japanese School in Prague

As of 2005–2007, parents of Japanese nationality residing in the United States and Europe, as well as other industrialized and developed regions, generally prefer local schools over nihonjin gakkō, while Japanese parents in Asia and the Middle East prefer nihonjin gakkō.

In 2003 11,579 Japanese students living in Asia (outside Japan) attended full-time Japanese schools, making up more than 70% of the Japanese students in Asia. In Oceania, 194 Japanese pupils attended full-time Japanese schools, making up 7.7% of the total Japanese students in Oceania. In North America there were 502 students at full-time Japanese schools, making up 2.4% of Japanese pupils on that continent. As of 2007, there were a total of three nihonjin gakkō on the U.S. mainland recognized by MEXT.

Since the early 1990s, more parents have chosen a local school or an international school over nihonjin gakkō. Reasons include:

- The parents prefer for their children to receive education in English;
- Nihonjin gakkō have only elementary and middle schools, grades first through ninth, which are mandatory in Japan. Some schools offer a kindergarten program as well as a high school program, but they are uncommon. Children educated in an English-speaking environment will be able to continue their education where they live with their parents. Those who choose not to participate in the local education system will need to pass an entrance exam to enroll in a boarding school in Japan or one of the seven (as of October 2006) Shiritsu zaigai kyōiku shisetsu (私立在外教育施設), Japanese boarding schools worldwide.
- The parents' desire to acculturate their children;
- Many private and public Japanese schools have become flexible and accept expatriate students via a separate admissions system, or by offering exams in English.

== Locations ==
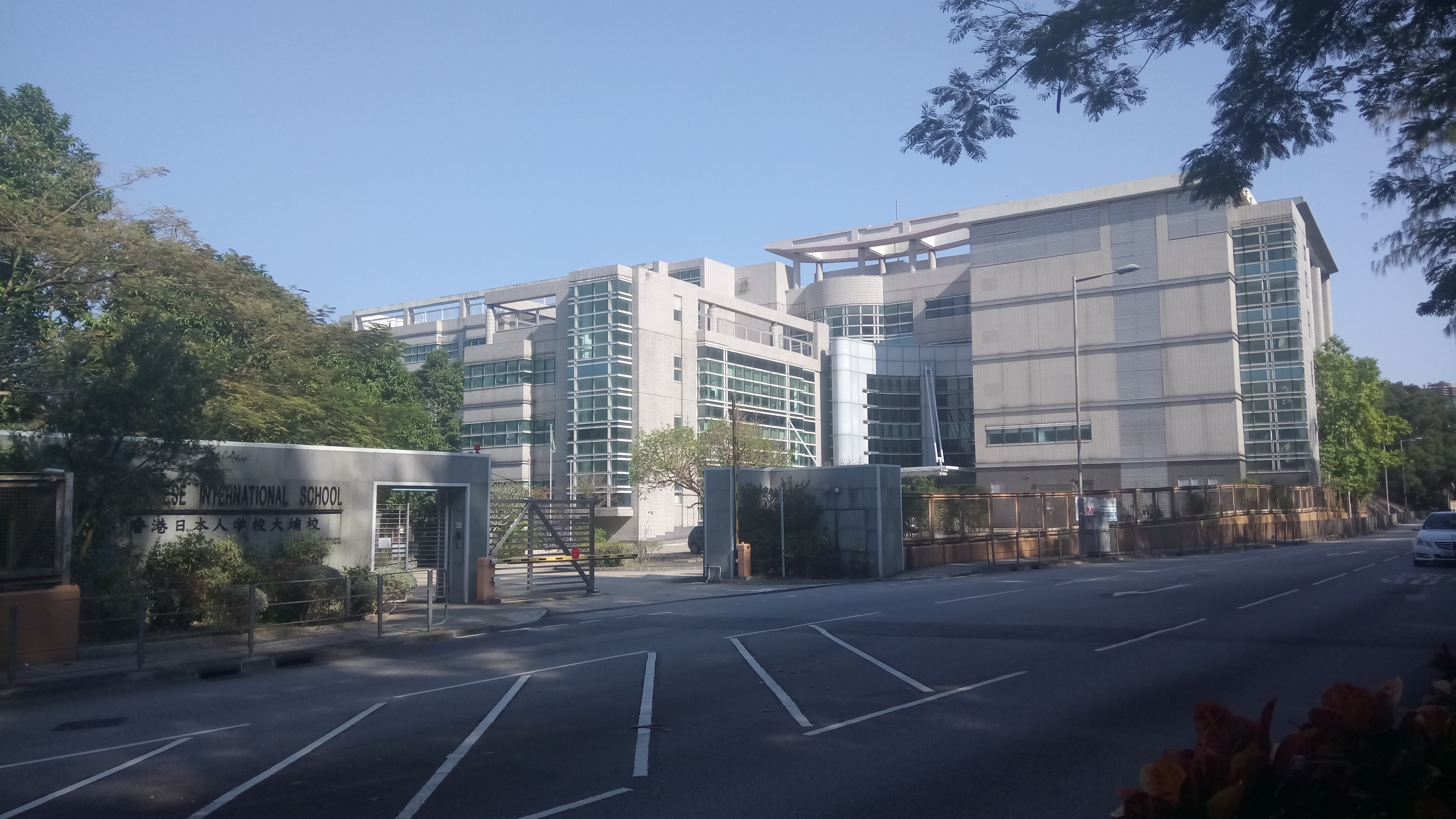
Hong Kong Japanese School International School Campus in Tai Po

Nihonjin gakkō tend to be in the following types of areas in the world:

- Those with a large Japanese temporary resident population, such as London or New York City.
- Those where English is not the official language, such as Düsseldorf, São Paulo, Mexico City, Lima, Dubai, Shanghai and Kuala Lumpur.

As of October 2006:

=== Map ===
Locations of nihonjin gakkō in the world (red dots are clickable)

=== Asia ===
Locations of nihonjin gakkō in Asia, Russia, and Turkey
- Bangladesh
  - Japanese School Dhaka
- Cambodia
  - Japanese School of Phnom Penh, established in 2015
- Mainland China
  - Japanese School of Beijing
  - Japanese School of Dalian
  - Japanese School of Guangzhou
  - Hangzhou Japanese School (杭州日本人学校)
  - Qingdao Japanese School (青島日本人学校)
  - Shanghai Japanese School
  - Shenzhen Japanese School
  - Japanese School of Suzhou
  - Tianjin Japanese School (天津日本人学校)
- Hong Kong
  - Hong Kong Japanese School
- India
  - Japanese School of Mumbai
  - Japanese School New Delhi
- Indonesia
  - Bandung Japanese School
  - Cikarang Japanese School
  - Jakarta Japanese School
  - Surabaya Japanese School (スラバヤ日本人学校)
- Malaysia
  - Japanese School of Kuala Lumpur
  - The Japanese School of Johor (ジョホール日本人学校, Malay: Sekolah Jepun (Johor))
  - Kota Kinabalu Japanese School (コタキナバル日本人学校)
  - Penang Japanese School (ペナン日本人学校, Malay: Sekolah Jepun P. Pinang)
  - The Japanese School of Perak (ペラ州日本人学校, Malay: Sekolah Jepun Perak)
- Myanmar
  - Yangon Japanese School
- Pakistan
  - Islamabad Japanese School
  - Karachi Japanese School
- Philippines
  - Manila Japanese School (Taguig)
- Republic of China (Taiwan)
  - Kaohsiung Japanese School
  - Taichung Japanese School
  - Taipei Japanese School
- Singapore
  - Japanese School Singapore
  - Other schools catering to Japanese are Waseda Shibuya Senior High School in Singapore — a Shiritsu zaigai kyoiku shisetsu (私立在外教育施設) or overseas branch of a Japanese private school.
- South Korea
  - Busan Japanese School
  - Japanese School in Seoul
- Sri Lanka
  - Japanese School in Colombo
- Thailand
  - Thai-Japanese Association School (Bangkok)
  - Thai-Japanese Association School Sriracha (Si Racha)
- Vietnam
  - Japanese School of Hanoi
  - Japanese School in Ho Chi Minh City

=== Middle East (not including Africa) ===
Locations of nihonjin gakkō in the Middle East and North Africa
- Egypt
  - See Africa
- Iran
  - Tehran Japanese School
- Qatar
  - Japan School of Doha
- Saudi Arabia
  - Jeddah Japanese School
  - Riyadh Japanese School
- Turkey
  - Istanbul Japanese School
- United Arab Emirates
  - Japanese School in Abu Dhabi
  - Dubai Japanese School

=== North America ===
Locations of nihonjin gakkō in North America (Guam is on the Oceania map)
- Mexico
  - Escuela Japonesa de Aguascalientes (アグアスカリエンテス日本人学校) (in Japanese) (Aguascalientes)
  - Instituto Educativo Japonés de Guanajuato (グアナファト日本人学校 (in Japanese) (Irapuato, Guanajato)
  - Liceo Mexicano Japonés (Mexico City)
- United States (Note: There are additional schools which are not classified as nihonjin gakkō by the Ministry of Education, Culture, Sports, Science and Technology; they are instead shiritsu zaigai kyōiku shisetsu (overseas branches of Japanese private schools): Nishiyamato Academy of California and Keio Academy of New York, as well as the defunct schools Seigakuin Atlanta International School and Tennessee Meiji Gakuin - Also these are day schools neither authorized nor designated by MEXT; therefore they are not nihonjin gakkō nor are they shiritsu zaigai kyōiku shisetsu: Japanese Children's Society (a.k.a. New York Ikuei Gakuen) (in Japanese) (Englewood Cliffs, New Jersey) and Sundai Michigan International Academy (Novi, Michigan))
  - Japanese School of Guam (Mangilao, Guam)
  - Chicago Futabakai Japanese School (Arlington Heights, Illinois)
  - New Jersey Japanese School (Oakland, New Jersey)
  - Japanese School of New York (Greenwich, Connecticut)

=== Central and South America ===
Locations of nihonjin gakkō in South America
- Argentina
  - Asociación Cultural y Educativa Japonesa (ブエノスアイレス日本人学校, "Japanese School of Buenos Aires")
- Brazil
  - Japanese School of Manaus
  - Escola Japonesa de São Paulo
  - Associação Civil de Divulgação Cultural e Educacional Japonesa do Rio de Janeiro
- Chile
  - Instituto de Enseñanza Japonesa (サンチャゴ日本人学校) - Lo Barnechea, Santiago Province
- Colombia
  - Asociación Cultural Japonesa (ボゴタ日本人学校; "Japanese School of Bogotá")
- Costa Rica
  - Escuela Japonesa de San José - Moravia, San José Province
- Guatemala
  - Escuela Japonesa en Guatemala (グァテマラ日本人学校)
- Panama
  - Escuela Japonesa de Panamá
- Paraguay
  - Colegio Japonés en Asunción (アスンシオン日本人学校)
- Peru
  - Asociación Academia de Cultura Japonesa (Lima)
- Venezuela
  - Colegio Japonés de Caracas (カラカス日本人学校) -

=== Europe ===
Locations of nihonjin gakkō in Europe
- Austria
  - Japanese International School in Vienna
- Belgium
  - Japanese School of Brussels
- Czech Republic
  - Japanese School in Prague
- France
  - Institut Culturel Franco-Japonais – École Japonaise de Paris (Montigny-le-Bretonneux, Île-de-France)
- Germany
  - Japanische Internationale Schule zu Berlin
  - Japanische Internationale Schule in Düsseldorf
  - Japanische Internationale Schule Frankfurt
  - Japanische Schule in Hamburg
  - Japanische Internationale Schule München
- Hungary
  - The Budapest Japanese School
- Italy
  - Scuola Giapponese di Milano
  - Scuola Giapponese di Roma
- Netherlands
  - Japanese School of Amsterdam
  - Japanese School of Rotterdam
- Poland
  - Japanese School in Warsaw
- Romania
  - Japanese School in Bucharest
- Russia
  - Japanese School in Moscow
- Spain
  - Japanese School in Barcelona (Sant Cugat Del Vallès, Catalonia)
  - Colegio Japonés de Madrid
- Switzerland
  - Japanese School in Zurich (Uster, Canton of Zurich)
- Turkey
  - See Middle East
- United Kingdom
  - Teikyo School United Kingdom (Wexham, Buckinghamshire)
  - Rikkyo School in England (Rudgwick, West Sussex)
  - Japanese School in London

=== Africa ===
Locations of nihonjin gakkō in Africa
- Egypt
  - Cairo Japanese School
- Kenya
  - Nairobi Japanese School
- South Africa
  - Japanese School of Johannesburg

=== Oceania ===
Locations of nihonjin gakkō in Oceania
- Australia
  - Japanese School in Perth
  - Japanese School of Melbourne
  - Sydney Japanese International School
- Guam (U.S.)
  - See North America

=== Former locations ===
Locations of closed nihonjin gakkō in the world (brown dots are clickable)

Africa:

- Algeria
  - École japonaise d'Alger (アルジェ日本人学校) - Algiers - Designated on January 11, 1978 (Showa 53), certified on January 12, 1994 (Heisei 6), revoked March 29, 2002 (Heisei 14)
- Nigeria
  - Lagos Japanese School (ラゴス日本人学校) - Designated and certified on March 1, 1975 (Showa 50), revoked March 29, 2002 (Heisei 14)

Asia (excluding Middle East):

- India
  - Calcutta Japanese School (カルカタ日本人学校) - Designated on March 30, 1976 (Showa 51), certified on December 18, 1992 (Heisei 4), revoked March 29, 2002 (Heisei 14).
- Indonesia
  - Medan Japanese International School or Medan Japanese School (メダン日本人学校, Indonesian: Sekolah Internasional Jepang, Medan)
    - It was affiliated with the Japanese Consulate General in Medan, and occupied a 481.88-square-metre (5,186.9 sq ft) building on a 1,880-square-metre (20,200 sq ft) property. It originated as a supplementary school in the consulate's library that opened in April 1972 (Showa 49). A committee to establish a new day school was created in 1978 (Showa 54), and in January 1979 (Showa 55) the school remodeled an existing building for this purpose. The school opened in April 1979. It closed in March 1998.

Middle East (excluding Africa):

- Bahrain
  - Japanese School in Bahrain (バハレーン日本人学校)
- Iraq
  - Baghdad Japanese School (バグダッド日本人学校)
- Kuwait
  - Kuwait Japanese School (クウエイト日本人学校)
- Lebanon
  - Beirut Japanese School (ベイルート日本人学校) - Designated February 10, 1972 (Showa 47), revoked March 29, 2002 (Heisei 14)
- Turkey
  - Ankara Japanese School (アンカラ日本人学校), under the name Japanese Embassy Study Group - Opened April 1, 1979 (Showa 54),

Europe:

- Greece
  - Japanese Community School of Athens - Closed March 2007
- Spain
  - Colegio Japonés de Las Palmas - Opened in October 1973, closed in March 2001,
- Former Yugoslavia
  - Belgrade Japanese School (ベオグラード日本人学校)

South America:

- Brazil
  - Escola Japonesa de Belém (ベレーン日本人学校) - Designated on February 25, 1977 (Showa 52), Certified on December 18, 1992 (Heisei 4), revoked March 29, 2002 (Heisei 14).
  - Escola Japonesa de Belo Horizonte (ベロ・オリゾンテ日本人学校), a.k.a. Instituto Cultural Mokuyoo-Kai Sociedade Civil - Santa Amélia, Paumplha, Belo Horizonte - Designated on February 6, 1982 (Showa 57), Certified on December 18, 1992 (Heisei 4), revoked March 29, 2002 (Heisei 14).
  - Escola Japonesa de Vitória (ヴィトリア日本人学校) - Designated February 10, 1981 (Showa 56), Certified December 18, 1992 (Heisei 4), revoked March 29, 2002 (Heisei 14)
- Ecuador
  - Colegio Japonés de Quito (キト日本人学校) - Closed in 2003

== See also ==
- Japanese language education in the United States
