= List of Quality Schools International schools =

This is a list of schools currently or formerly operated by Quality Schools International.

== Current schools ==
Country	City	School name	Region	Established
Albania	Tirana	Tirana International School	Europe	1991
Armenia	Yerevan	QSI International School of Yerevan	Caucasus	1995
Azerbaijan	Baku	Baku International School	Caucasus	1994
Belarus	Minsk	QSI International School of Minsk	Europe	1993
Belize	Belize City	QSI International School of Belize	The Americas	2011
Benin	Cotonou	QSI International School of Benin	Africa	2012
Bosnia & Herzegovina	Sarajevo	QSI International School of Sarajevo	Europe	1997
China	Chengdu	QSI International School of Chengdu	Asia	2002
China	Dongguan	QSI International School of Dongguan	Asia	2004
China	Shenyang	QSI International School of Shenyang	Asia	2012
China	Shenzhen	QSI International School of Shenzhen	Asia	2001 (Shekou)
China	Zhuhai	QSI International School of Zhuhai	Asia	1999
Djibouti	Djibouti	QSI International School of Djibouti	Africa	2016
East Timor	Dili	QSI International School of Dili	Asia	2005
Georgia	Tbilisi	QSI International School of Tbilisi	Caucasus	1995
Germany	Münster	QSI International School of Münster	Europe	2015
Guyana	Georgetown	QSI International School of Guyana	The Americas	2022
Hungary	Pápa	QSI International School of Pápa	Europe	2012
Italy	Brindisi	QSI International School of Brindisi	Europe	2005
Kazakhstan	Atyrau	QSI International School of Atyrau	Asia	2007
Kazakhstan	Almaty	Almaty International School	Asia	1993
Kazakhstan	Astana	QSI International School of Astana	Asia	2005
Kosovo	Pristina	QSI International School of Kosovo	Europe	2015
Kyrgyzstan	Bishkek	QSI International School of Bishkek	Asia	1994
Malta	Mosta	QSI International School of Malta	Europe	2007
Moldova	Chișinău	QSI International School of Chișinău	Europe	1996
Montenegro	Podgorica	QSI International School of Montenegro	Europe	2005
North Macedonia	Skopje	QSI International School of Skopje	Europe	1996
Slovakia	Bratislava	QSI International School of Bratislava	Europe	1994
Suriname	Paramaribo	QSI International School of Suriname	The Americas	2018
Tajikistan	Dushanbe	QSI International School of Dushanbe	Asia	2004
Thailand	Phuket	QSI International School of Phuket	Asia	2000
Togo	Lomé	QSI International School of Togo	Africa	2022
Turkmenistan	Ashgabat	Ashgabat International School	Asia	1994
Ukraine	Kyiv	Kyiv International School	Europe	1992
Venezuela	El Tigre	QSI International School of El Tigre	The Americas	2004
Vietnam	Haiphong	QSI International School of Haiphong	Asia	2005

== Former schools ==
Country	City	School name	Region	Notes
Afghanistan	Kabul	QSI International School of Kabul	Asia	
China	Chongqing	QSI International School of Chongqing	Asia	
China	Macau	QSI International School of Macau	Asia	
China	Suzhou	QSI International School of Suzhou	Asia	
China	Wuhan	QSI International School of Wuhan	Asia	
Kazakhstan	Aktau	QSI International School of Aktau	Asia	
Russia	Novosibirsk	QSI International School of Novosibirsk	Europe	
Russia	Vladivostok	QSI International School of Vladivostok	Europe	
Russia	Yekaterinburg	QSI International School of Yekaterinburg	Europe	
Slovakia	Košice	QSI International School of Kosice	Europe	
Slovenia	Ljubljana	QSI International School of Ljubljana	Europe	
Trinidad and Tobago	Trinidad	QSI International School of Trinidad	The Americas	
Venezuela	Puerto La Cruz	QSI International School of Puerto La Cruz	The Americas	
Vietnam	Hanoi	QSI International School of Hanoi	Asia	
Yemen	Aden	QSI International School of Aden	Asia	
Yemen	Sanaa	Sana'a International School	Asia	1971
