= Almaty International School =

QSI - Almaty International School
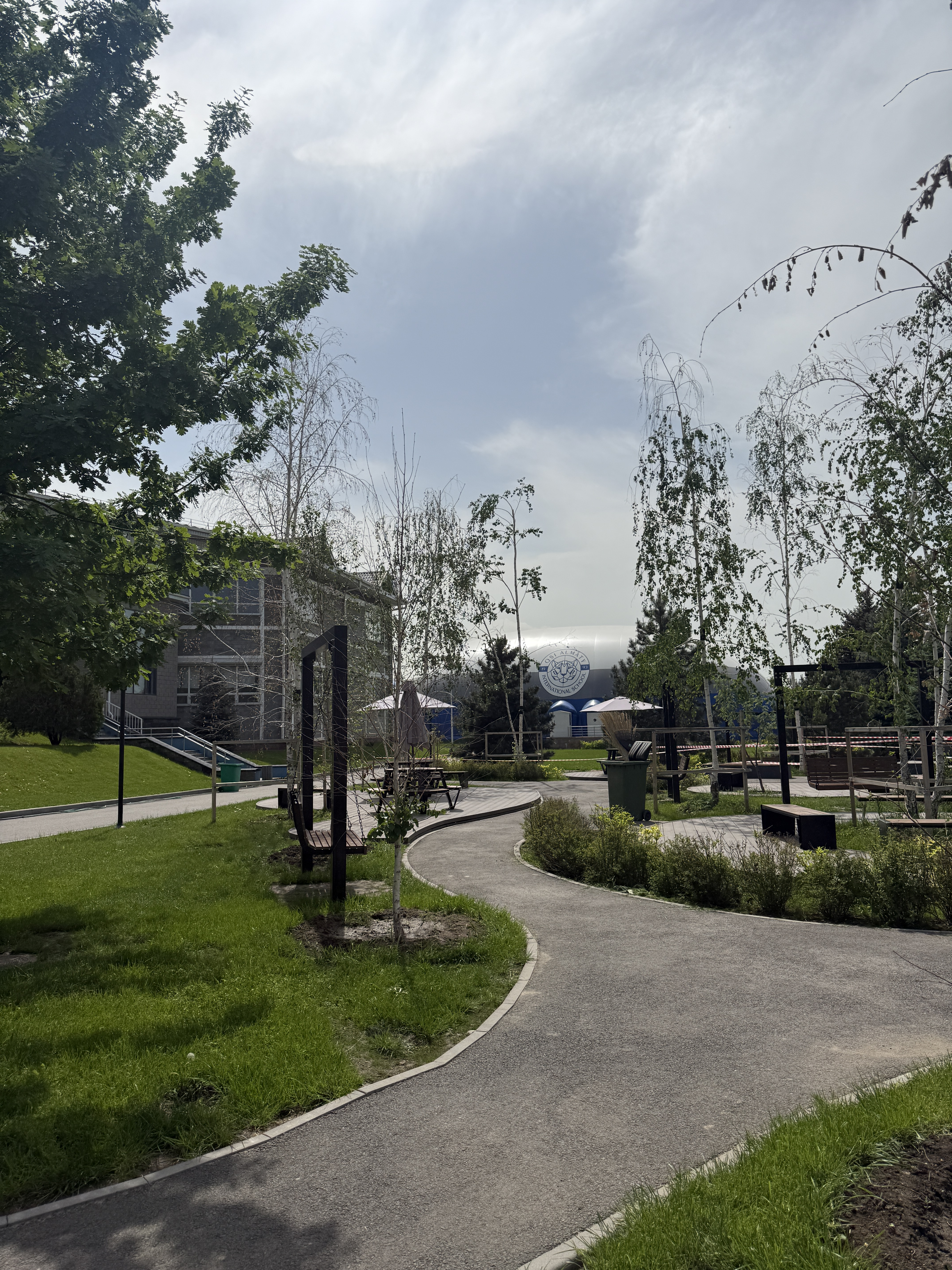
- Almaty International School campus

Location
- Baiken Ashimov Street 185; Kalkaman Village, Almaty 050006; Kazakhstan

Information
- Type: Private, non-profit
- Motto: Success For All
- Established: August 1993
- School district: Nauryzbai District
- Oversight: Quality Schools International
- CEEB code: 788021
- Directors: Ms. Carla Grossman
- Directors of Instruction: Mr. Matthew Stalker; Mr. Tom Kaualoku
- Grades: K-12
- Years offered: Pre-K to 12th Grade
- Enrollment: about 500 (June 2026)
- Education system: American/QSI/Advanced Placement
- Language: English (Kazakh, Russian, Spanish and French in the case of World Languages)
- Hours in school day: 8:00-3:30 (normal school day) 3:30-5:00 (athletics/after-school activities) 8:00-11:16 (half days)
- Campus size: 7 hectares
- Campus type: suburb
- Colors: Blue and White
- Athletics: Yes
- Athletics conference: COASH/CAFA
- Sports: Football, Flag Football, Basketball, Cross Country, Volleyball, Track and Field, Badminton
- Mascot: Snow Leopard
- Nickname: AIS, QSI Almaty
- Teams: Varsity Boys, Varsity Girls, JV Boys, JV Girls (varies by sport)
- Team name: Snow Leopards
- Accreditation: MSA/CEESA
- Annual tuition: Pre-K (half-day): $7,300, Pre-K (full-day): $8,800, grades K-12: $25,000
- Website: www.qsi.org/almaty/

Almaty International School (AIS) is a private school located in Almaty, Kazakhstan. Founded by QSI (Quality Schools International) in 1993, it is the third largest school out of all the QSI schools. The school offers an American-based Pre-K and K-12 programs. School facilities include: an elementary building, secondary building, annex (music building), small gym, big gym, sports dome, library, cafeteria, birch room, birch tree area, field with an Olympic size track, 3 playgrounds, and the teachers apartments. The school hosts international events and participates in many sports events such as the CAXC (Central Asian Cross Country Classic), CASC (Central Asian Soccer Classic), CABC (Central Asian Basketball Classic), and CAVC (Central Asian Volleyball Classic). The school is also used as a site for SAT, PSAT and AP testing. The school is operated with the authorization of the Kazakhstani Government.

== Study and Programs ==
Elementary students learn Literacy, Writing, Math, Cultural Studies, Science, World Languages, Music, Technology, Art, and PE (physical education). Middle and Secondary Students get to choose electives which include PE/Wellness, Technology, Music (Band/Orchestra/Choir/Guitar), Drama or Art. Students that can not go yet into their appropriate age program will be placed in IE (Intensive English) classes for Literacy, Writing, and World Languages. They move up when they can go to the appropriate program of their age. The school has 7 Success Orientations to follow:

- Responsibility
- Kindness & Politeness
- Trustworthiness
- Aesthetic Appreciation
- Concern for Others
- Group Interaction
- Independent Endeavor

Students may receive an E (Exemplary) or an N (Not Yet) on their grade report for the success orientations. The norm is an S (Success). Es and Ns are not awarded lightly and goes through a separate process.

The school is funded partially by the U.S. Department of State. The school is accredited by CEESA and MSA.

== History ==
Founded by QSI (Quality Schools International) in 1993, it is the third largest school out of all the QSI schools. The school offers an American-based Pre-K and K-12 programs. The school is fully accredited through Middle States Association (MSA) and affiliated with the U.S. Department of State Office of Overseas Schools (AOS).

== Controversies ==
Over the course of its existence, the school has been at the center of a number of controversies. On January 28th, 2026, a student was hospitalized after she attempted to commit suicide at the school. Later that day her father, Kazakhstani entrepreneur Kanat Amirkin wrote a viral Facebook post, describing how the school ignored repeated instances of bullying towards his daughter, eventually leading to her attempting to end her life. The following day, an investigation was opened in adherence to Article 105 - Incitement to Suicide of the Criminal Code of the Republic of Kazakhstan. On January 31st, the case was closed. In the following weeks, Kanat Amirkin continued to advocate for his daughter, claiming the investigation was closed unusually quickly.

== Curriculum ==
The QSI education system differs from the traditional American system in several aspects. The naming of the key stages in the QSI curricular system diverges from typical naming. Additionally, the different stages cover different age groups. The table below represents all the changes:

QSI Education System
Traditional American Schools	QSI Schools	Age Group
Preschool	Pre-K	3-4
Preschool	Kindergarten	5
Elementary School	Kindergarten	5
Elementary School	Lower Elementary	6-8
Elementary School	Upper Elementary	9-11
Middle School	Upper Elementary	9-11
Middle School	Middle School	12-13
High School	Secondary	14-18

A variety of AP Courses is offered, ranging from AP World History to AP Chemistry. Spanish, French, Russian and Kazakh languages are offered in QSI Almaty. The school, being located in Kazakhstan, is obligated to abide by Kazakhstan's Ministry of Education's regulations. To meet the regulations, QSI Astana, QSI Aktau, QSI Atyrau, and Almaty International School (QSI Almaty) made Kazakh History, Kazakh Language, and Military Preparation classes mandatory for all Kazakh nationals. Intensive English class is compulsory for ESL (English as a Second Language) students who have struggles effectively communicating in English. A university counselor is also offered to the Secondary classes. An AP Lab/Study Hall is offered to high school students with tight schedules and/or numerous AP subjects.

The QSI grading system also differs from that of traditional American schools:

QSI Grading System					
A level	B Level	P (In Progress)	H (On Hold)	W (Withdrawal)	D (Deficient)
Student illustrated knowledge beyond mastery, went beyond what was expected of him/her and has completed all the TSW's	Student illustrated mastery in the unit and completed all the TSW's	Student is in progress of mastering the unit and has not completed the unit at that point in time	Student is placed on hold for a particular reason by the teacher; H's can be issued to a whole class or one student	Student withdrew from the particular unit or the subject as a whole	Student showed deficiency in completing a unit; therefore, receives a D for that particular unit

TSW ("The Student Will") are a set of guiding points that illustrate what the student should learn in the unit/subject. A TSW sheet is created by a group of teachers with expertise in that particular subject. Every unit in every subject has a TSW sheet.

== AP Courses and Activities ==
The school offers diverse AP Courses which include:

- AP Art
- AP Calculus AB/BC
- AP Statistics
- AP Biology
- AP Chemistry
- AP Environmental Science
- AP Physics 1
- AP Physics C
- AP US History
- AP Music Theory
- AP Seminar
- AP Research
- AP English Language and Composition
- AP English Literature and Composition
- AP Human Geography
- AP World History: Modern
- AP Micro/Macro Economics
- AP Spanish Language
- AP French Language
- AP Computer Science Principles
- AP Computer Science A
- AP Comparative Government and Politics

Activities at the school are:

- Student Council
- National Honor Society
- Speech and Debate
- Model United Nations
- Tri-M Music Honor Society
- Yearbook Club
- Math Club

== See also ==
- List of international schools
- List of schools in Almaty
- Kazakhstan International School
- Quality Schools International
