= Education in Kazakhstan =

Kazakhstan's 1995 constitution provides mandatory, socialized secondary school education. Citizens compete for socialized institutions of higher learning. Private education is increasing in the country, with about 5% of students enrolled in the private schools that remain largely under arbitrary state control.

In 2000, the government of Kazakhstan joined the governments of the Kyrgyz Republic and Tajikistan, and the Aga Khan to establish the world’s first internationally chartered institution of higher education, the University of Central Asia (UCA). The UCA will have three campuses of equal size and stature in each of the founding countries. The Kazakh campus is under construction in Tekeli in the Zhetysu region, 35 minutes east of the regional capital Taldykorgan, and three hours by car from Almaty. The UCA will benefit from the resources of the Aga Khan Development Network to offer an internationally recognized standard of higher education in Central Asia. Currently, the University operates a School of Professional and Continuing Education (SPCE), with a School of Undergraduate Studies and a Graduate School of Development in the process of being established.

In 2002 Asian Development Bank provided technical assistance to Kazakhstan to identify key issues and priorities in the education sector and to contribute to strengthening the government's education sector development strategy. The United States provided 137 Peace Corps members to "work in education and NGO development" in 2004.

Kazakhstan has a 99.1% literacy rate for males and 97.7% for females as of 1999.

When United States Secretary of State Condoleezza Rice visited Kazakhstan from 12–13 October 2006, she said "The future of any state depends on its level of education. This is my fourth visit to Kazakhstan, I have already been to Atyrau and Almaty and I have been able to see for myself the high level of education of your nation, which is a key to success of any country."

The Human Rights Measurement Initiative (HRMI) finds that Kazakhstan is fulfilling only 81.0% of what it should be fulfilling for the right to education based on the country's level of income. HRMI breaks down the right to education by looking at the rights to both primary education and secondary education. While taking into consideration Kazakhstan's income level, the nation is achieving only 62.2% of what should be possible based on its resources (income) for primary education and 99.8% for secondary education.

== Process of education ==
=== Kindergarten ===
The Constitution of the Republic of Kazakhstan protects the right to access to kindergarten. Children typically start kindergarten at age 5. As of 2004, there were 100 kindergartens in the nation (83 public, 4 directly under the Ministry of Education, and 13 private) and 135 856 children enrolled in kindergartens (or 63% of the 5- and 6-year-olds). All kindergartens are expected to teach Kazakh and Russian, and most emphasize one language over the other.

One major problem has been the reduction of the number of kindergartens, due to the lack of state funding and virtually non-existence of private sources of money. There are also reported declines in the quality of kindergartens including a lack of hot meal or low quality food served and buildings in poor repair.

=== Primary school ===
Primary school in Kazakhstan typically starts at age 7 (some parents send their children to school, when they turn 6, very rarely - 8) and runs from years 1 – 4. Classes typically run in two sessions, from 8 until 1 and from 2 until 7, with students either going to class in the morning or in the afternoon. All primary schools are state-owned and primary and secondary education are constitutionally protected rights.

The curriculum for both primary and secondary school is established by the Ministry of Education, with little choice left up to the individual schools. Textbooks are published by independent retailers and must be bought by the students themselves.

Primary school is provided free to all citizens and residents of Kazakhstan and parents typically pay only for extra-curricular activities such as sports programs, music programs, and sometimes lab equipment or other special equipment.

=== Lower secondary school ===
Students continue in lower secondary school from grade 5 to year 9. This roughly corresponds to what is called in the USA, junior high school, or middle school. Typically a student in year 8 is 14–15 years old. The curriculum is a general education curriculum covering subjects like literature, student's first language, Russian or Kazakh language (depending on the language of the school in general), history, physics, mathematics, biology, chemistry, foreign language, and so on.

=== Higher secondary school ===
Once leaving lower secondary school, there are three tracks available. Students are free to choose any track of higher secondary education but are required to pursue one. Graduates of all tracks are eligible to enter university. The first track is a general secondary school which covers grades 10-12 and provides general education. In addition, there are two curriculum tracks for vocational education: initial vocational education which is provided by training schools and lycees, and secondary vocational education provided by colleges and trade schools.

- Initial training schools are designed to train students in a skilled profession. The program is usually two or three years, (typically ages 16–18), but for some professional training four-year programs are required. Students who graduate can go on to colleges for advanced vocational training or attend university. The state pays the costs of education.
- Lyceums provide basic vocational education to prepare students for skilled professions and includes general academic education. The course of study is three years. The state pays the costs of education.
- Colleges give a program that provides both academic general education and advanced vocational education. Colleges, if licensed, can provide initial vocational education. Programs last for three or four years (grades 10–12, 13). Accelerated programs exist for students who have already completed general secondary education and initial vocational training in the same field. Graduates may go on to university or may begin working. As of the 1999 Budget Law, colleges are state-owned and self-financed. In principle, however, all compulsory education (primary and secondary) is provided free of charge.

The curriculum for primary and secondary school is established by the Ministry of Education, with little choice left to the individual schools. Textbooks are sold in bookstores and are purchased by the students themselves. Like primary school, secondary school is subsidized by the government. Parents only pay for extracurricular activities such as sports programs, music programs, and sometimes lab equipment or other special equipment.

=== Tertiary institutions ===
Most of universities, following the Russian system, focus entirely on teaching and do not engage in research. Students who are accepted to university at any level apply under a specific major, and the curriculum is set by the university (according to State legislation) for each major. For example, economics majors will all study in the same courses in the same order, separate from English majors who have a different curriculum. Some courses are required for a variety of majors and there is a possibility of switching majors but typically classes do not transfer to the new major and the student is expected to reenter in the new major as a first year.

The government is currently pursuing a program to adopt a credit-system which would allow students to study more easily internationally, and to add the possibility of a curriculum with electives and student-chosen courses.

There are four levels of tertiary education in Kazakhstan:

- Bachelor's degree — typically a four-year degree
- Specialist Degree — typically a five-year degree and more intensive than the Bachelor's
- Master's degree — typically a two-year degree, roughly corresponding to the Western master's.
- Doctoral Degree — typically a five-year program

Universities are usually headed by a rector, appointed by the President of Kazakhstan, who wields considerable authority over the institution, approving all decisions including those regarding curriculum, personnel, and admission. Thus Kazakhstan universities are more centralized than their Western counterparts.

The flagship research university in Kazakhstan is Nazarbayev University. Two other prominent universities in Kazakhstan are al-Farabi Kazakh National University in Almaty and L. N. Gumilyov Eurasian National University located in Astana.

In addition, there are a few international universities such as KIMEP, which is a joint program, 40% owned by the government of Kazakhstan, but education is based on the Western system. The Kazakh-British Technical University and the Kazakh-American University represent joint projects between Kazakhstan and the UK and the USA, respectively. In all three institutions, the language of instruction is English. The University of Central Asia, founded jointly by the Governments of Kazakhstan, Kyrgyzstan and Tajikistan and by the Aga Khan, is affiliated with the Aga Khan Development Network. Its Kazakhstan campus is located in Tekeli. A number of specialty universities also exist. As of, there were public universities and private universities.

Private universities, typically for-profit institutions, are subject to the same regulations regarding curriculum but are free to set tuition and salaries as they see fit. Public universities are subject to the same regulations as other government-owned organs, regarding not only fees and salaries, but also administrative structure, contracting and subcontracting, and ownership of property.

State owned universities receive funding if their enrollment reaches 86,000 students or 34%. A small number of universities are financed through a budget line in the Republic budget, such as art academies or international universities.

== Public funding of education ==
Students who have not received general upper secondary education have the academic portion of their program financed by the state. As for the vocational track, some students pay fees and others are financed through the state order program, where state authorities request a certain number of trained workers and specialists in certain fields. These students are chosen through a merit-based competition based on grades and recommendations from teachers or public officials.

Education for the nation as a whole made up

- 14.4% of public expenditures in 1999
- 12.1% in 2000
- 11.9% in 2001
- 12.6% in 2002

of which the lion's share went to general education:

Share (%) of public expenditure on education by level and type, 1999-2003

| Level/type of education | 1999 | 2000 | 2001 | 2002 | 2003 | Average |
|---|---|---|---|---|---|---|
| Pre-school education | 3.1 | 3.7 | 3.2 | 3.3 | 3.0 | 3.3 |
| General education | 68.4 | 73.7 | 65.2 | 68.7 | 66.2 | 68.4 |
| Primary vocational education | 3.2 | 3.3 | 2.9 | 3.3 | 3.6 | 3.2 |
| Secondary vocational education | 3.5 | 3.3 | 2.5 | 2.5 | 2.3 | 2.8 |
| Other educational programmes | 11.9 | 6.1 | 17.1 | 12.3 | 16.4 | 12.8 |
| Higher education | 9.9 | 10.0 | 9.1 | 9.9 | 8.5 | 9.5 |

Comparative average monthly salaries (KZT), 1999-2003

| sector | 1999 | 2000 | 2001 | 2002 | 2003 (first half) |
|---|---|---|---|---|---|
| National | 11,864 | 14,374 | 17,303 | 20,323 | 21,991 |
| Industry | 16,370 | 20,647 | 23,812 | 26,280 | 27,952 |
| Public administration | 11,308 | 11,758 | 14,970 | 16,930 | 17,374 |
| Health care and social work | 6,821 | 7,267 | 8,288 | 10,863 | 12,089 |
| Education | 8,149 | 8,512 | 9,937 | 12,863 | 14,510 |

== Projects and programs ==
=== Nazarbayev Intellectual Schools ===
Nazarbayev Intellectual Schools (NIS) was founded in 2008 (as Orken) with a mission "to enhance the intellectual capacity" of Kazakhstan. In effect, the organisation develops, pilots and disseminates programmes for use in the national system of primary and secondary education, through its network of primary and secondary schools, professional development centres (Centres of Excellence), international schools, and associated organisations. The recent curriculum reforms were initiated by the NIS working in partnership with the National Academy of Education.

=== Arystan Specialized Lyceum ===
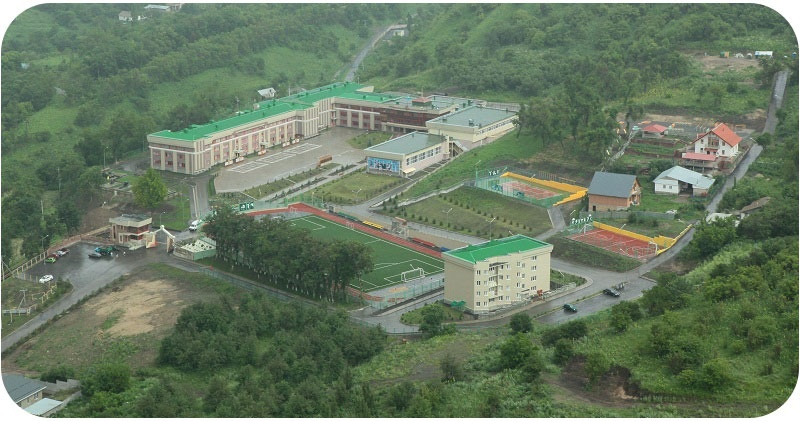
The Arystan Specialized Lyceum

The Specialized Lyceum "Arystan" began operating in January 2011, with students from all regions coming to study at the lyceum from the ninth to eleventh grade. It is sponsored by the Nazarbayev Foundation. Heavily entrenched in the army way of life, there are 21 military officers and 5 military specialists who work at the lyceum, which also allows for basic military training and the promotion of discipline. The lyceum has its own flag like a military unit, as well as an emblem, oath of allegiance, and code of honour. In April 2013, President Nazarbayev described the lyceum as "a good example of participation of private capital in expanding access to qualitative education". There have been six graduating classes, of which many have entered military educational institutions of Defence Ministry, Nazarbayev University and Eurasian University, as well as educational Institutions of Russia, Belarus, Ukraine, and the United States.

=== Bolashak ===
The Bolashak Scholarship of the President of the Republic of Kazakhstan, was created in 1993 by the decree of the President: “In Kazakhstan’s transition toward a market economy and the expansion of international contacts, there is an acute need for a workforce with advanced western education, and so, it is now necessary to send the most qualified youth to study in leading educational institutions in foreign countries”. The Scholarship is merit-based and the selection process includes not only academic credentials, but also competence in the language of study, psychological testing and an interview process. Commitment to development of Kazakhstan and patriotism are factors as well. The final decision is made by the Republican Commission, chaired by the State Secretary and composed of the Ministers, members of Parliament, and members of the Office of the President. The Republican Commission also approves the country of study and program of study.

The Scholarship requires that all recipients return to Kazakhstan after graduating and work for five years in Kazakhstan. The Scholarship pays for all costs related to education, including tuition and fees, costs of travel, and a living stipend. Scholars are expected to maintain academic excellence. In the US, this translates to a 3.0 GPA.

There are currently about 1,800 scholarship recipients studying abroad in 24 countries. About 1,700 were awarded the Scholarship in 2005. The most popular countries are the USA (about 700 students chosen in 2005), the UK (about 400 students chosen last year) and Russia (about 300 students chosen in 2005). Australia and Malaysia are two countries represented for the first time in 2005 and host 2 Bolashak Scholars each. Nazarbayev University started his work from 2010, and it covers Bolashak system, therefore, Bolashak program has been closed for bachelors only.

=== Bologna Process ===
The Government is in finishing stage of implementing a credit system with Western academic three-levels (Bachelor-Master-PhD) which allows Kazakh students to study internationally without any understanding issues. Kazakh National educational system also allows the possibility of a curriculum with electives and student-chosen courses.

=== Spiritual and moral ===
In March 2001, Sara Nazarbayeva initiated the development of the Project of Moral and Spiritual Education (SME) "Self-knowledge".

On September 1, 2010, the mass introduction of the subject "Self-knowledge" into the system of continuous education of the Republic of Kazakhstan began: kindergarten - school - college - university. In pedagogical universities, the specialty "Social pedagogy and self-knowledge" was introduced, within the framework of which the training of future teachers of self-knowledge began.

In June 2012, the first graduation of certified teachers of self-knowledge, trained by the Humanitarian College "Self-knowledge" of harmonious human development, was carried out.

== Problems ==
In connection with a lack of school facilities or a lack of teachers, some primary and secondary schools run three, instead of two sessions, so one group of students attends from 8 to 1pm, a second from 1pm to 6. This results in overworked teachers, students who are kept up late, and overused facilities.

The Asian Development Bank (ADB) published a report on financing of public education in Kazakhstan in 2004, which mentions widely agreed upon criticisms of the public education system reported elsewhere. According to this report, financing of public education is low, and mechanisms to introduce private financing have been unsuccessful. Furthermore, the Budget Code and the law 'On education' fail to clearly delineate responsibilities of local and central government, nor do they include sufficient mechanisms for monitoring budget expenditures.

The Organisation for Economic Cooperation and Development published a report in 2014 on the education system in Kazakhstan. According to the report, Kazakhstan achieved significant improvements in the quality of education and increased access to primary and secondary education. The report also indicated that Kazakhstan had embarked on profound reforms to improve the quality of the education system and was increasingly looking to international standards and best practices.

== See also ==
- List of universities in Kazakhstan
- Kazakhstan International School
- List of schools in Almaty
- Japanese language education in Kazakhstan
- Education in the Soviet Union
- National Library of Kazakhstan
- American Corners in Kazakhstan
