= Japanese language education in Kazakhstan =

Language education

Tertiary students of Japanese, 2007
Institution	Major	Minor	Other	Total
Al-Farabi University	72	46	10	128
Kazakh University of International Relations	35	133	85	253
Kazakh Academy of Labour and Social Relations	13	10	0	23
Kazakh National Pedagogical University	0	149	19	168
Eurasian National University	0	0	163	163
Kazakh Economics University	0	0	20	20
KIMEP	0	0	25	25
Total	120	338	322	780

Japanese language education in Kazakhstan dates back to 1992; the Japan Foundation's 2006 survey showed 51 teachers teaching the language to 1,569 students at thirteen institutions in Kazakhstan; the number of students increased by 38% as compared to the 2003 survey and more than triple the number in the 1998 survey. As of 2024, according to the Japan Foundation, 581 people were learning Japanese in Kazakhstan.

== History ==
Japanese language education in Kazakhstan formally began with the 1992 establishment of a Japanese language course at Almaty's Al-Farabi University; Kazakh National Technical University, Kazakh University of International Relations, Kazakh National Pedagogical University, Almaty Management University, and two other universities in Kazakhstan soon followed. Courses at the elementary and secondary levels were established several years later; two schools began offering Japanese classes in 1996, followed by another three in 1998 and an additional four schools after 2000. However, by 2003, four of the primary and secondary programmes were terminated due to lack of teaching staff, while an additional two universities and one non-school institution began to offer Japanese language courses. For students in primary and secondary schools, Japanese language classes might begin as early as the fifth year of compulsory education, proceeding until the eighth or the eleventh year. As of 2007, Kazakhstan had 43 teachers of Japanese, among whom eight were native speakers. Students majoring in Japanese faced problems such as low wages and lack of opportunities to use their skills in professional contexts, leading to limits on the growth of interest in the language.

Much language study is funded not indigenously, but rather through a portion of the US$95 million in official development assistance provided by Japan's Ministry of Foreign Affairs, as well as additional private aid. There is no unified national curriculum for Japanese studies at either the primary, secondary, or tertiary levels; rather, institutions design their own curricula, typically with the aid of, and using textbooks published by, the Japan Center, which is also funded by the Japanese government.

== Standardised testing ==
JLPT examinees in Kazakhstan
Year	City	Examinees by Level				
Year	City	L1	L2	L3	L4	Total
2006	Almaty	50	98	135	91	374
2005	Almaty	28	43	68	25	164
2004	Almaty	34	63	61	28	186
2003	Almaty	41	87	42	24	194

The Japanese Language Proficiency Test has been offered in Kazakhstan since 2003, solely in the former capital of Almaty. The number of examinees fell every year for the first two years after the test's introduction, but in 2006, their count more than doubled; the number of people taking the introductory 4th-level examination nearly quadrupled. However, JETRO's Business Japanese Test was not offered in Kazakhstan or any other former Soviet Union member state as of 2006.

== See also ==
- Japanese as a foreign language
- Education in Kazakhstan
- Japanese language education in Kyrgyzstan
- Japan–Kazakhstan relations
