= List of educational institutions in Astana =

This is a list of educational institutions located in Astana, Kazakhstan.

== Higher education ==
- L.N.Gumilyov Eurasian National University
- Nazarbayev University
- S.Seifullin Kazakh Agro Technical University
- Kazakh Humanities and Law Institute
- Kazakh National University of Arts
- Kazakh University of Economics, Finance and International Trade
- Astana Medical University
- Astana International University
- Astana IT University

== Secondary education ==
Private schools in Astana:

- Miras International School
- Haileybury Astana
- Nur-Orda International School
- Astana Kazakh-Turkish High School
- Nazarbayev Intellectual Schools
- QSI International School of Astana
