= Miras International School =

Miras International School may refer to either of two schools in Kazakhstan:

- Miras International School, Almaty
- Miras International School, Astana
