= International School of Almaty =

Coordinates: 43.23547°N 76.90536°E

- Satpayev, 40B, Almaty 050006; Kazakhstan

Information
- Type: Private
- Established: 2000
- Director: Akasheva Zhibek Zekenovna
- Nickname: ISA
- Website: www.qsi.org/kazakhstan/kaz/

The International School of Almaty (ISA) in Kazakhstan is a branch of the "Education Fund of Nursultan Nazarbayev". The school provides education on integrated programs of the state educational standard of the Republic of Kazakhstan and the International Baccalaureate of primary and basic schools from the 1st to the 11th grade.

In 2017, the school was admitted to the UNESCO Associated Schools. The International School of Almaty hosts an annual contest of social and creative projects of UNESCO Associated Schools.

== Administration ==
The first director of the International School of Almaty is Akasheva Zhibek Zekenovna, an Honored Worker of Education of the Republic of Kazakhstan, laureate of Tarlan Prize. The coordinator of international programs is Bazarbayeva Roza Kasymovna. Loginova Irina Viktorovna has been appointed as a new director of the International School of Almaty in 2020.

== History ==
In 2000, the school became the first in Kazakhstan to be authorized by the International Baccalaureate Organization for the Middle Years Program. In 2013, the school was authorized for the Primary Years Program, an elementary school program.

== See also ==
- List of international schools
- List of schools in Almaty
