= QSI International School of Dushanbe =

Location
- 3 Turakul Zehni Street; Dushanbe; Tajikistan

Information
- Type: Private; Non-Profit
- Established: 2004
- School district: Quality Schools International
- Director: Mrs. Taizu Wold
- Grades: K-12
- Enrollment: ≈150
- Mascot: Falcon
- Website: dushanbe.qsi.org

QSI International School of Dushanbe is a branch of the non-profit organization Quality School International and is located in Dushanbe, Tajikistan. QSI International School of Dushanbe was founded in 2004 as a private institution and currently has approximately 150 students. QSI International School of Dushanbe teaches students from preschool (age 3) to secondary school (age 18) with a curriculum entirely in English. In addition to English, there are also other foreign-language classes offered in Russian (native and non-native), German, and French.

== Facilities ==
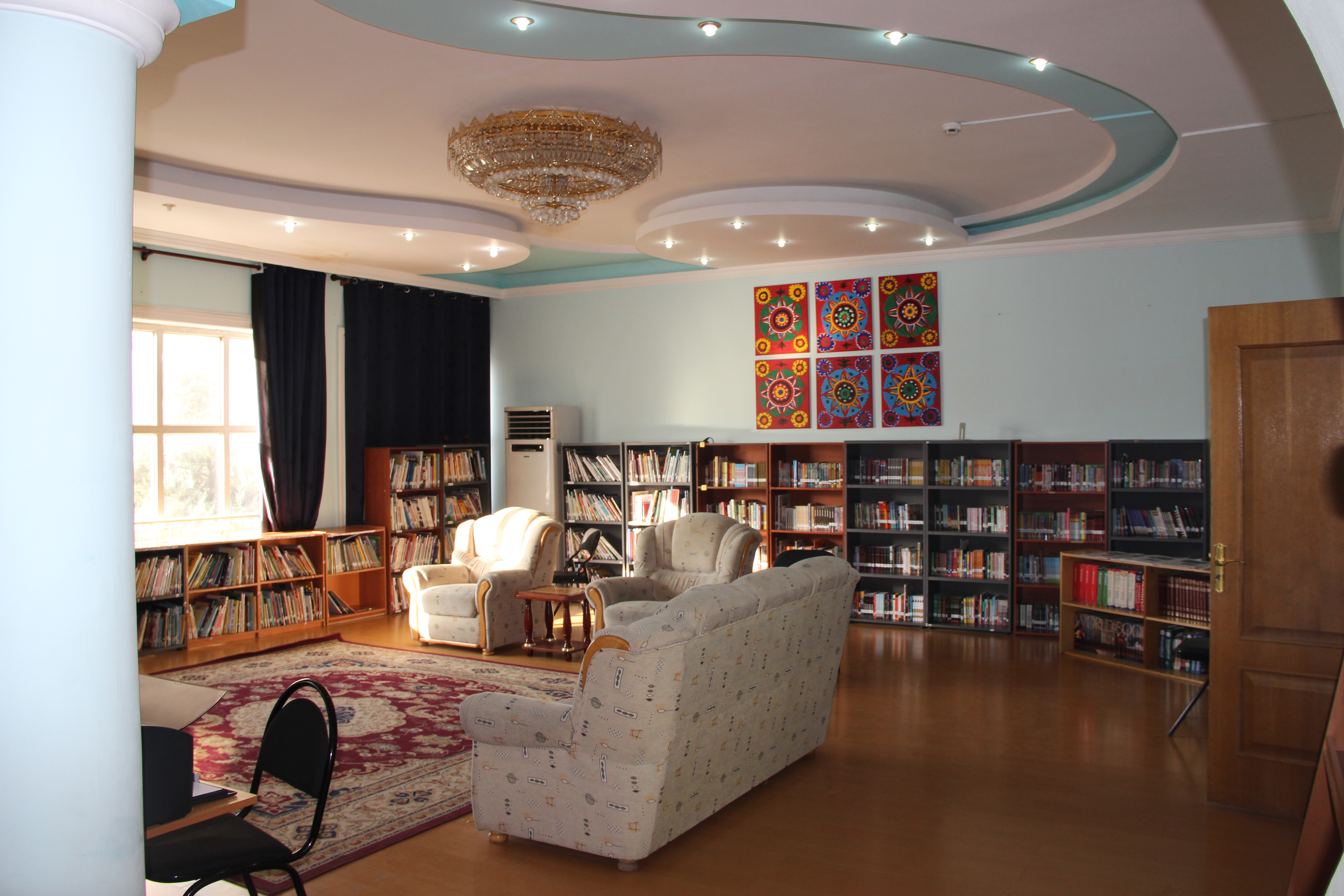
The library in Building 1 of QSI Dushanbe

QSI Dushanbe was first established in 2004 at 2 Osipenko Street. The school changed its location in March 2010 since the student population grew to 39 students and the facility no longer provided the necessary space for the development of the school. The school relocated to 85 Sovetskaya Street in 2016. In the summer of 2022, the school relocated to a purpose-built facility at 3 Turakul Zehni Street.

== Educational Program ==
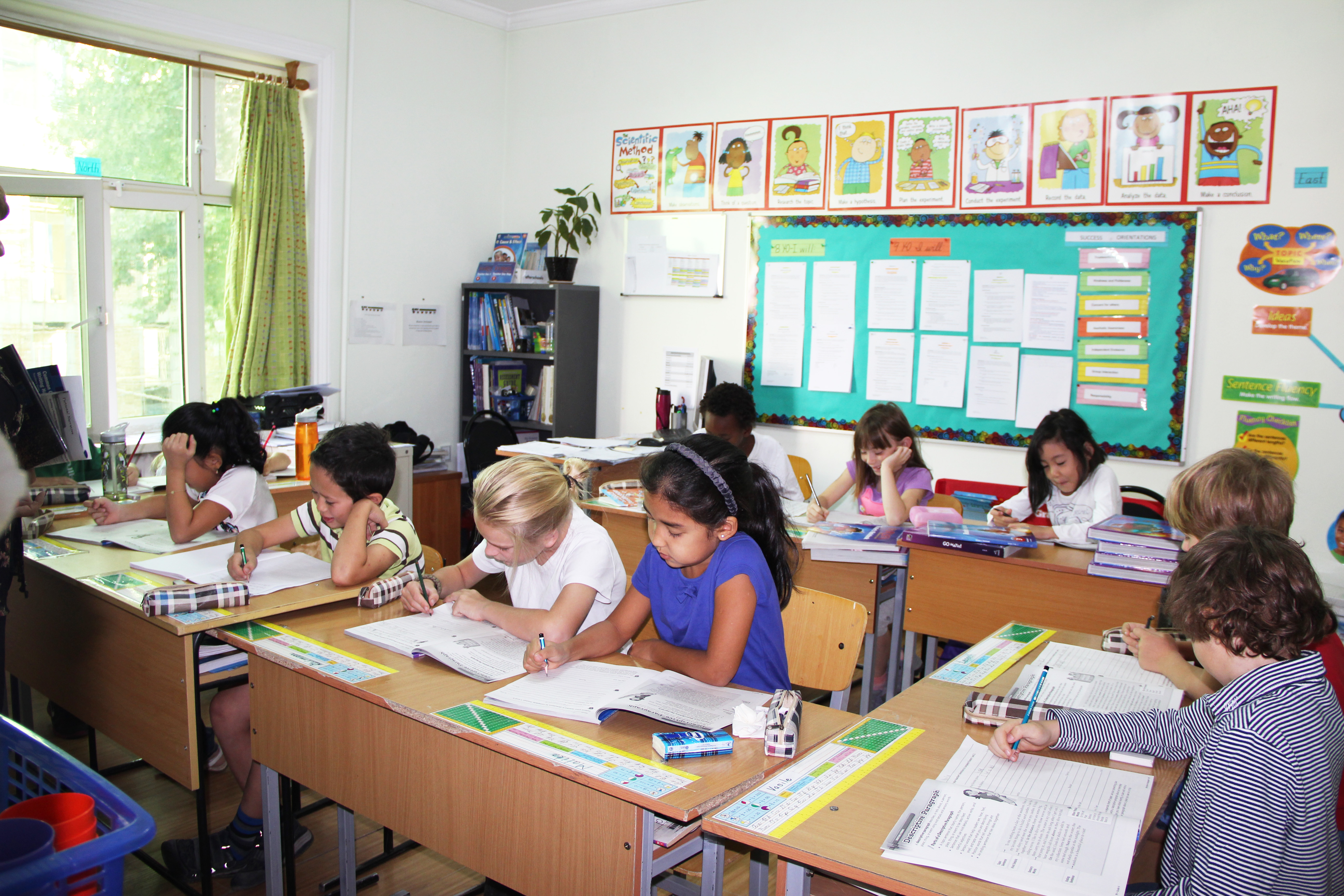
QSI Dushanbe students studying in one of the classrooms

The Elementary program of QSI Dushanbe consists of grades 1-8 and the curriculum is based on the American education system. The subjects that are taught include: Mathematics, Literature, Writing, Cultural Studies, Music, Art, Physical Education, Science, Technology, Study Skills, Russian, French, and German.

QSI Dushanbe offers a secondary program that leads to a Secondary School Diploma. The three diplomas that are offered by QSI Dushanbe are the general diploma, the academic diploma, and the academic diploma with honors. The academic diploma requires a total of 240 credits, while the academic diploma with honors requires at least two Advanced Placement (AP) classes on top of 240 credits. The general diploma requires a total of 220 credits and is available to students experiencing English language difficulties, time restraints, or other challenges that make it impractical to pursue an academic diploma. The general diploma is only available to students who are in their fourth year of secondary studies or who will turn 18 years old no later than 30 October following their graduation.
