= Tirana International School =

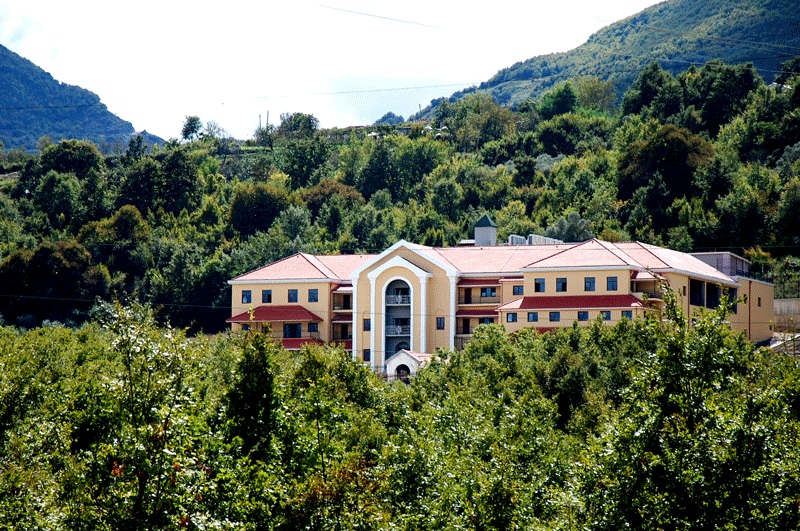

Location
- Rruga Gim Gilson, Mullet Village (Near TEG), Tirana; Albania
- Coordinates: 41.2722°N 19.8660°E

Information
- Type: Private
- Motto: Success For All
- Founded: 1991
- Principal: Jonathan Mudd
- Grades: Pre-K - 12
- Language: English
- Colors: Orange and black
- Mascot: Tiger
- Team name: TIS Tigers
- Website: www.qsi.org/tirana

Tirana International School, established in 1991 directly before the fall of the communist system in Albania, is an English-medium international school in Tirana, Albania. Its curriculum, while similar to US schools, contains links to both local culture and international educational elements. The current enrollment is approximately 520 students from 35 countries in preK – 12th grade classes. Tirana International School is part of Quality Schools International and is accredited by the Middle States Association of Colleges and Schools.

With tuition fees starting at around 25,000 euros per year, since its inception Tirana International School has been the most expensive private education provider in Albania, attended almost exclusively by the children of the country's wealthiest elite and the children of diplomatic staff based in Tirana.

== Curriculum ==
The curriculum focuses on English literacy skills, mathematics, cultural studies, the sciences, computer literacy, art, music, foreign languages (French, Spanish, German, Albanian and Russian) and physical education as part of the regular program. Intensive English classes are provided for those with a limited knowledge of the English language.

TIS offers onsite the College Board Advanced Placement (AP) Capstone Diploma and individual AP courses. As of 2021, TIS offers the International Baccalaureate diploma (IB). Students choose the IB, AP, or standard TIS track to complete high school.

== Faculty ==
There are 87 teachers currently employed at TIS, and 121 total staff. Teachers come mainly from the United States and Albania, with several other countries represented, including the UK, China, and Senegal. All teachers are certified.
