= Lycée français de Bakou =

Location
- 15 Nobel Avenue; White City, Baku; Azerbaijan

Information
- Type: Private
- Established: 2013
- Closed: 2024
- Principal: Alain Mante
- Grades: Pre-school; 1–12
- Affiliations: Ministry of Education of France
- Languages: French
- Foreign languages: English, Azerbaijani
- Website: Official website

Lycée français de Bakou (LFB; Azerbaijani: Bakı Fransız Liseyi) was a French international school in Baku, Azerbaijan founded in 2013 in order to provide education for French-speaking foreigners and Azerbaijanis who wished to study French. It served the école maternelle and the école primaire directly, while the collège (junior high school) and the lycée (senior high school/sixth form) were served with the National Center for Distance Education (CNED). It was affiliated with the Mission Laïque Française (MLF).

== History ==
The Heydar Aliyev Foundation, the Embassy of France in Baku and the State Oil Company of the Azerbaijan Republic (SOCAR) initialized the building of the school by the agreement signed in March 2011. The foundation ceremony was held in the same year by the participation of the presidents of the two countries.

During the official trip to Azerbaijan in 2014, president of France François Hollande met the construction procedures of Lycée français de Bakou by the attendance of Azerbaijani president İlham Aliyev and the first lady Mehriban Aliyeva. The opening ceremony was held on September 12, 2014, and followed by the participation of Ilham Aliyev and Mehriban Aliyeva.

=== Closure ===
In April 2024, a decision was made to close the Lycée français de Bakou at the end of the academic year 2023-2024, citing commercial problems. However, the announced closure of the French high school in Baku came during a time of steadily deteriorating relations between Azerbaijan and France, which it accused of supporting Armenia against Azerbaijan during the Second Nagorno-Karabakh War in 2020 and after.

== Overview ==
The Lycée français de Bakou is situated in the area called "White City" in Baku. The school was capable to provide educational service for 400 students. Approximately, 70% of the students were Azerbaijanis. The rest of students were from various countries. Trainings were taught in French and qualified to the France National Education System. There were organized several special trainings such as, additional pedagogical trainings, French as a foreign language and theater for non-French students. Azerbaijani language was taught as a mother tongue. Besides, English was also taught as an additional language and Cambridge University program was applied for non-Azerbaijanis.

Graduation Certificates are accepted by the Ministry of Education (Azerbaijan) and Ministry of National Education (France). Moreover, graduates optionally can apply to all universities in France.

== The structure of the school ==
Pedagogical activities at the school were realized by the head of the school. The head of the school was defined by the Management Committee and makes reports to the committee.

The Management Committee constituted of four delegates such as, consultant of French Embassy in Azerbaijan, representatives from the Ministry of Education of Azerbaijan, State Oil Company of the Azerbaijan Republic and Heydar Aliyev Foundation.

== Admission ==
At the age of 2 children were accepted to the nursery school. Two types of schedule were available for pupils: 1) 08:00 – 15:00, 2) 08:00 – 19:00.

When children reached 6 years of age, they could apply for the primary school. Application procedure from the third grade followed by a French exam. Lessons lasted seven hours including breaks from 08:00 until 15:00. After the lessons, additional trainings were arranged for students.

Students were accepted to college and lyceum from the fourth and sixth grade. Distance education CNED was available from the eighth grade. The lessons started at 08:00 and continued until 15:00. During the week, Azerbaijani language, Literature, Geography and History compulsory lessons were taught between 15:00 and 15:45.

== See also ==
- International schools in Azerbaijan
- Baku International School - English-language international school
