= QSI International School of Ljubljana =

Coordinates: 46°2′15.2″N 14°27′30.4″E

Location
- Dolgi most 6a, 1000 Ljubljana

Information
- Established: 1995
- Principal: John M. Newton, Jr.
- Age range: 3–18
- Website: https://www.qsi.org/ljubljana/

QSI International School of Ljubljana (QSIL) is a school in Slovenia that caters to students from 15 different nationalities ranging from 3 to 18 years of age. It was established in 1995 and instruction of its core classes are carried out in English by native English speakers. QSIL also offers Slovene (language and culture), German, French, and Spanish to all students from 5 to 18 years old. QSI International School of Ljubljana (QSIL) offers an academic program that is based on mastery learning. The program emphasizes mathematics, the sciences, social studies, English, art, fine arts, and PE. The location near a river and woods offers an opportunity for outdoor education as well. It is operated by Quality Schools International, a global consortium of 39 non-profit schools in 27 countries.

== Location ==
QSI International School of Ljubljana is located in Ljubljana's Vič District. It is partially surrounded by woods, and the Mali Graben—a branch of the Gradaščica River—flows past the school to the east. The A1 Freeway runs about 120 meters (390 ft) south of the school. The closest facilities include the Dolgi Most Sports Center (Slovene: Športni center Dolgi most), immediately north of the school.
