= QSI International School of Astana =

Coordinates: 51°08′45.5″N 71°23′16.4″E

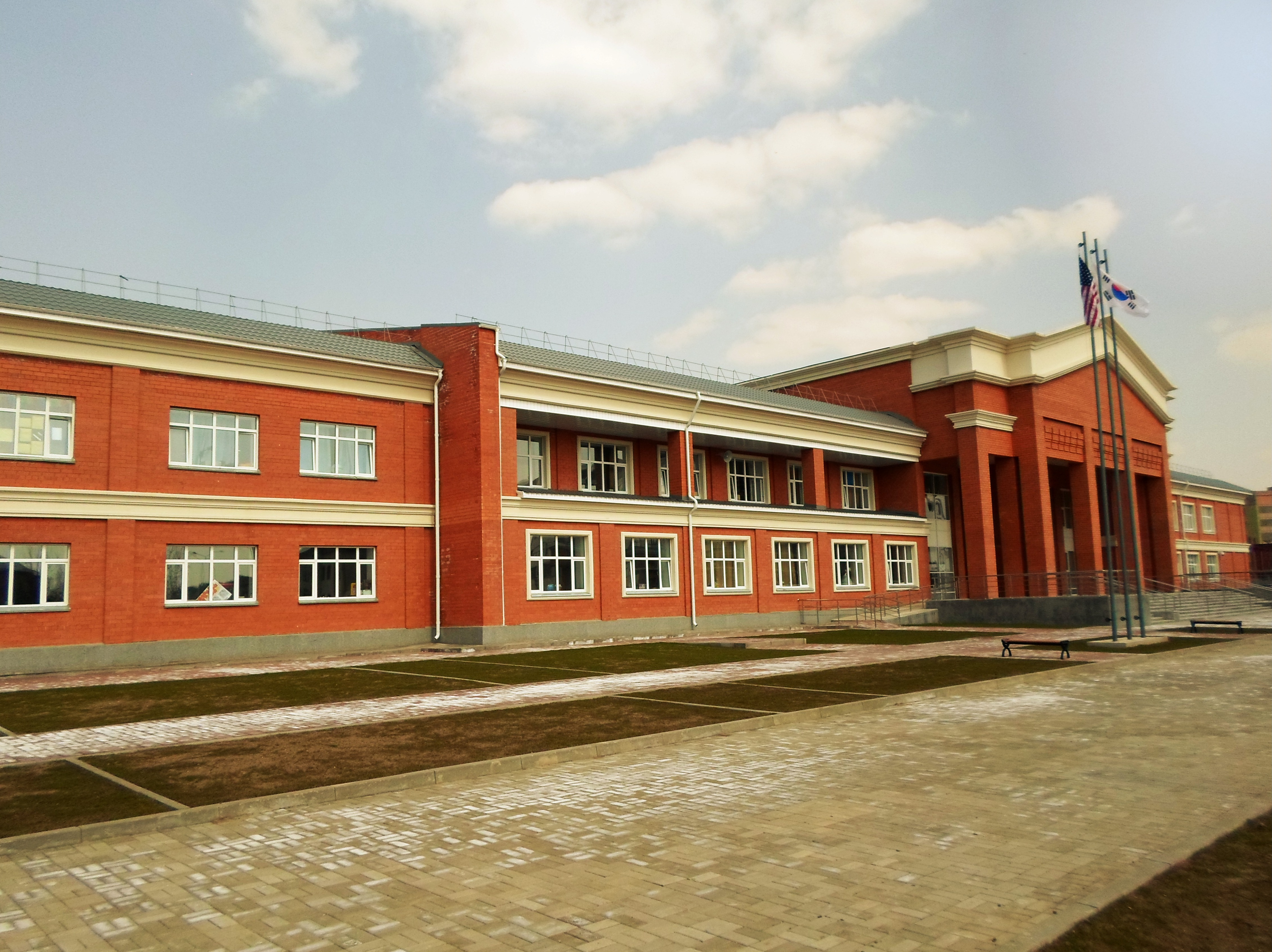
- QSI Astana from the front entrance (Sept. 2013)
- 15 Bayan-Sulu Street, Komsomolsky Village; Astana, Akmola Region 010000; Kazakhstan

Information
- Type: Private; Non-Profit
- Established: 2005
- School district: Quality Schools International
- Director: Shah Yessentayev
- Grades: K-12
- Enrollment: 350
- Colors: red, white and grey
- Mascot: Astana Wolves
- Website: astana.qsi.org

QSI International School of Astana is a branch of Quality Schools International located in Astana, Kazakhstan. QSI Astana was founded in 2005 as a non-profit, private institution. QSI International School of Astana has an English language of instruction; it offers a curriculum taught entirely in English from elementary school to secondary school. In 2013 a new facility completed construction, containing 32 classrooms, 3 computer labs, an auditorium, gymnasium, cafeteria, library, outdoor soccer field (with an Olympic running track) and basketball court, and several playgrounds. Classes range from Preschool to High School level.

== Accreditation ==
QSI Astana is based on the American Education system. All subjects (excluding second-language classes) are taught in English. Standardized MAP (Measurement of Academic Progress) tests have been adopted to provide an initial academic benchmark and intellectual progress of the school's students. The school has been accredited by CEESA and MSA/CESS (Middle States Commissions on Elementary and Secondary Schools) since 2011. QSI International School of Astana has also been certified as a legitimate testing center for the SAT Reasoning Test and all AP (Advanced Placement) tests. PSAT (Preliminary SAT) exams are offered to all secondary students. The school is licensed by Kazakh Ministry of Education.

== Curriculum ==
The QSI education system differs from the traditional American system in several aspects. The naming of the key stages in the QSI curricular system diverges from typical naming. Additionally, the different stages cover different age groups. The table below represents all the changes:

QSI Education System
Traditional American Schools	QSI Schools	Age Group
Preschool	Pre-K	3-4
Preschool	Kindergarten	4-5
Elementary School	Kindergarten	5-6
Elementary School	Lower Elementary	6-9
Elementary School	Upper Elementary	9-11
Middle School	Upper Elementary	11-12
Middle School	Middle School	12-14
High School	Secondary	14-18

A variety of AP Courses is offered, ranging from AP World History to AP Chemistry. Apart from Spanish, Russian and Kazakh languages are also offered in QSI Astana. The school, being located in Kazakhstan, is obligated to abide by Kazakhstan's Ministry of Education's regulations. To meet the regulations, QSI Astana, QSI Aktau, QSI Atyrau, and Almaty International School (QSI Almaty) made Kazakh History, Kazakh Language, and Military Preparation classes mandatory for all Kazakh nationals. Intensive English class is compulsory for ESL (English as a Second Language) students who have struggles effectively communicating in English. A university counselor is also offered to the senior class. Study Hall is offered to high school students with tight schedules and/or numerous AP subjects.

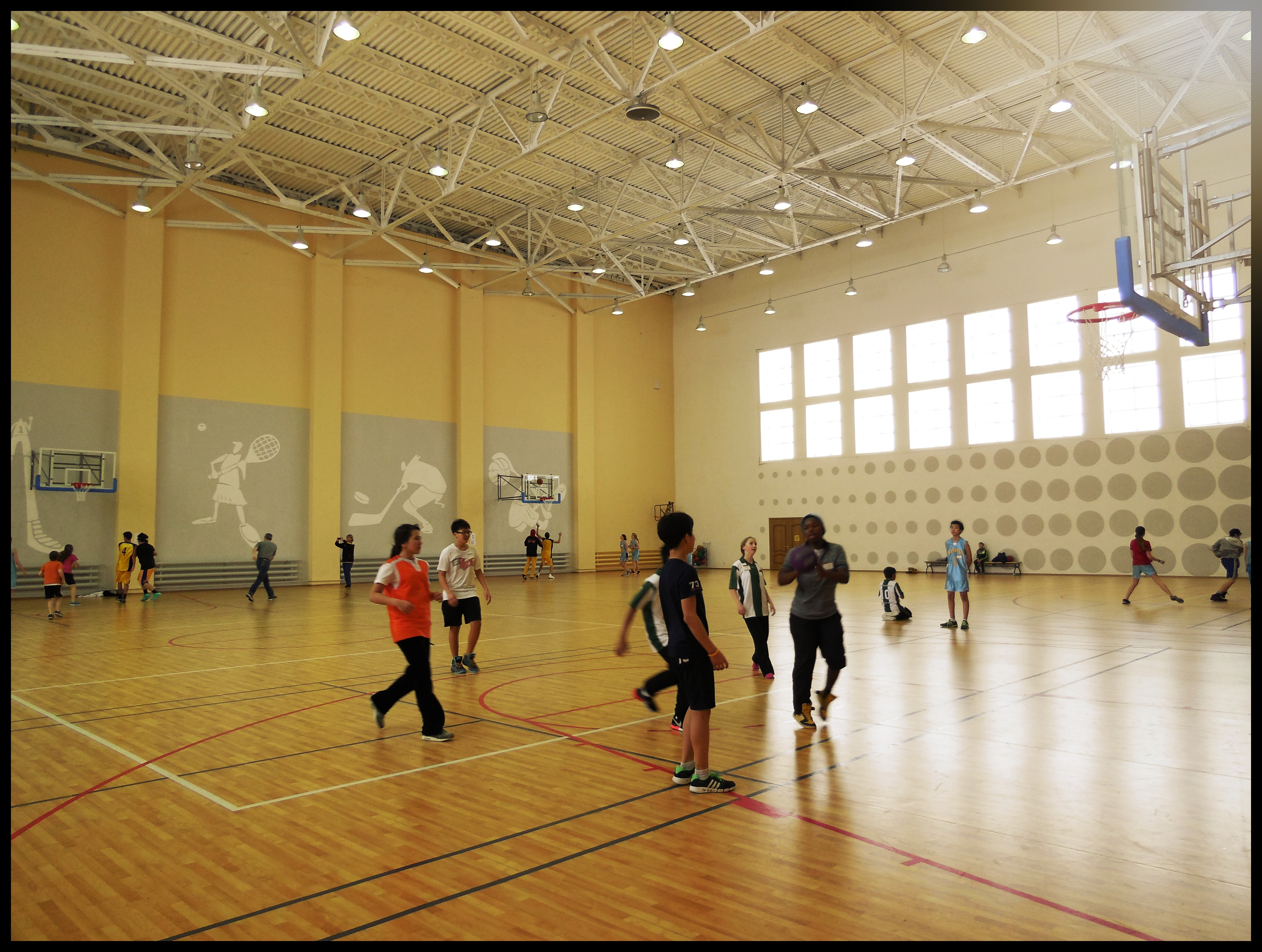
The indoor gym facility.

== Facility ==
The newly built school offers students a much broader spectrum of extra-curricular activities. The facility contains a fully functional 400m track with proper markings. Inside the track is an official size soccer field, made from synthetic grass and rubber bits. Adjacent to the track is a Long Jump Pit and an outdoor tennis/basketball court.

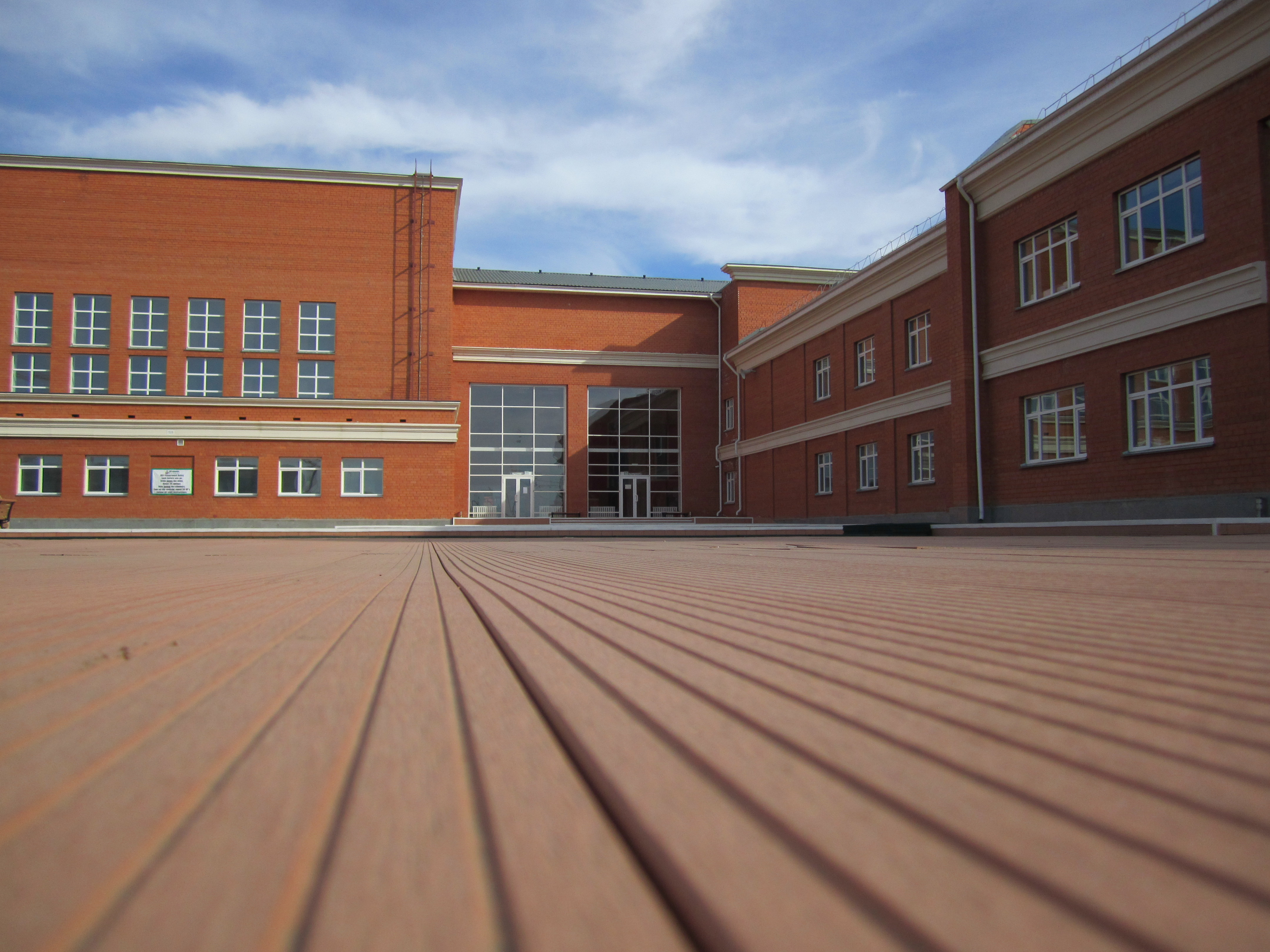
View of the facility from the track field.
