= Baku International School =

Location
- Ajami Nakhchivani street Baku; Azerbaijan
- Coordinates: 40.4203°N 49.85137°E

Information
- Type: Private, non-profit
- Motto: Success For All
- Established: 1994
- School district: Ganjlik District
- Oversight: Quality Schools International
- Director: Dr. Burnside Jody
- Grades: K-12
- Years offered: Pre-K to 12th Grade
- Enrollment: 192 (as of November 2023)
- Education system: American
- Language: English (Spanish, German, and French in the case of foreign languages taught)
- Hours in school day: 8:00AM-3:15PM
- Colors: Blue and White
- Athletics: Yes
- Sports: Football, Basketball, Cross Country, Volleyball, Track & Field
- Mascot: Eagle
- Nickname: BIS
- Team name: BIS Eagles
- Accreditation: MSA/CEESA
- Affiliations: Quality Schools International
- Languages: English
- Website: https://baku.qsi.org/

Baku International School (BIS) is an international school located in Baku, Azerbaijan, which was established by the Quality Schools International (QSI) group in 1994. The school provides preschool education, elementary education, middle school, and secondary education. The school programs are accredited by the Middle States Association of Colleges and Schools (MSA) in the United States.

As an international school, there are students from the United States, Azerbaijan, India, Poland, Greece, South Korea, Turkey, Germany, Japan, Colombia, Spain, Russia, Australia, Trinidad, and Romania.

For after-school activities, there are Boy Scouts, Girl Scouts, and ballet for preschool and elementary students. For middle and high school students, there are sports activities such as cross-country running, soccer, basketball, and track and field.

== Study and programs ==
Elementary students learn Literacy, Math, Cultural Studies, Science, World Languages, Music, Technology, Art, and PE (physical education). Middle and Secondary Students get to choose electives which include PE/Wellness, Technology, Music (Band/Orchestra/Choir/Guitar), Drama or Art. Students that cannot go yet into the appropriate age program go to IE (Intensive English) classes for Literacy and World Languages. They move up when they can go to the appropriate program for their age. The school has 7 Success Orientations to follow:

- Responsibility
- Kindness & Politeness
- Trustworthiness
- Aesthetic Appreciation
- Concern for Others
- Group Interaction
- Independent Endavour

The school is funded partially by the U.S. Department of State. The school is accredited by CEESA and MSA.

== Curriculum ==
The QSI education system differs from the traditional American system in several aspects. The naming of the key stages in the QSI curricular system diverges from typical naming. Additionally, the different stages cover different age groups. The table below represents all the changes:

QSI Education System
Traditional American Schools	QSI Schools	Age Group
Preschool	Pre-K	3-4
Preschool	Kindergarten	4-5
Elementary School	Kindergarten	5-6
Elementary School	Lower Elementary	6-9
Elementary School	Upper Elementary	9-11
Middle School	Upper Elementary	11-12
Middle School	Middle School	12-14
High School	Secondary	14-18

A variety of AP Courses is offered, ranging from AP World History to AP Chemistry. Intensive English class is compulsory for ESL (English as a Second Language) students who have struggle effectively communicating in English. A university counselor is also offered to the senior class. Study Hall is offered to high school students with tight schedules and/or numerous AP subjects.

== See also ==
- International schools in Azerbaijan
- Lycée Français de Bakou - French school in Baku
