= Baku White City =

City in Azerbaijan

Baku White City Bakı Ağ Şəhər
- Modern District
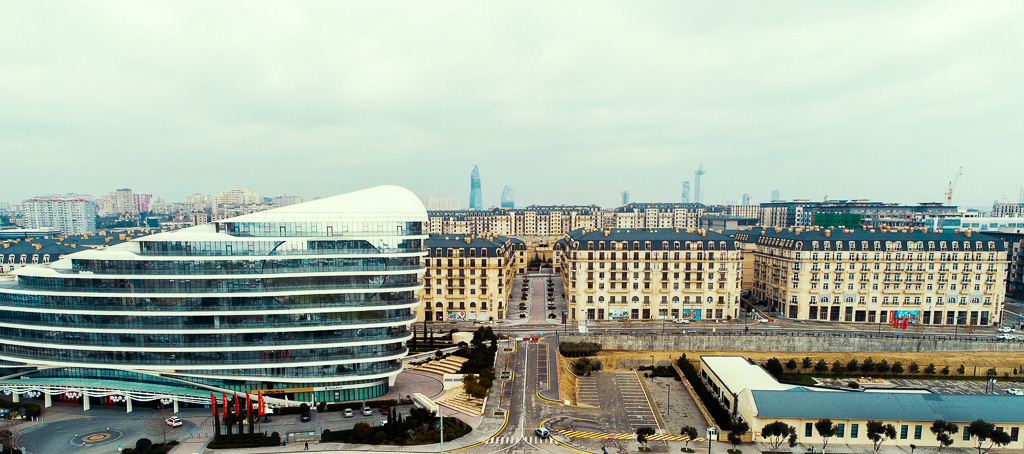
- View of Baku White City

- Location within Azerbaijan
- Coordinates: 40.382°N 49.888°E
- Country: Azerbaijan
- City: Baku
- District: Xətai-Khatai
- Established: 24 December 2011

Area
  - Total: 6.21 km^{2} (2.40 sq mi)

Population
  - Total: 50,000
  - Density: 8,100/km^{2} (21,000/sq mi)
- Time zone: UTC+4 (AZT)
- Website: bakuwhitecity.com/en

Baku White City (Azerbaijani: Bakı Ağ Şəhər [bɑˈcɯ ɑx ʃæˈhæɾ]) is a planned urban development in the Xətai-Khatai district of Azerbaijan. It is part of the 2021 strategic plan for Baku. It refers to the re-development of a portion of Black City, a 221-hectare (550-acre) land area.

== Development ==
The project was designed by Atkins and Foster and Partners. According to the plan, around 75% of the project consisted of residential units, totaling approximately 19,700 homes intended to house around 50,000 people. Commercial and leisure units were also included, which is projected to support up to 48,000 jobs. The project was completed in 2022.

The opening ceremony of Baku White City took place on 24 December 2011. In 2014, the Lycée français de Bakou (Baku French Lyceum) located in White City was inaugurated by President Ilham Aliyev. In 2015, the eastern part of the Baku Boulevard, the city's seaside promenade, was extended by two kilometers to cover the coastal part of White City. The Boulevard Hotel Baku was also established in the area.

One example of luxury accommodation in White City is the Knightsbridge Residence, designed by Chapman Taylor and built by Pasha Construction, part of Pasha Holding, which is investing heavily in the White City and is one of the developers.

Other notable projects are the Central Park District, the Baku White City Boulevard, Baku White City Gateway as well as the Port Area.

== Baku White City Office Building ==
In 2015, the Baku White City Office Building became the first building in Azerbaijan to be awarded BREEAM certification under international ecological standards, achieving a 'Good' rating.

== Transportation ==
=== Bus ===
From 19 November 2023, passenger buses operate on regular route number 4 (Nariman Narimanov - White City residential area).

=== Metro ===
- The Baku White City Metro Station Y-14 in
  Green line
  is under construction.
- B-8 in
  Purple line
  is planned in this area by Baku Metro.

=== Tram ===
In February 2012, the government of Azerbaijan announced that it would be planning to restore the tram line in Baku. A new line had to be laid along the seaside promenade of Baku Boulevard in central Baku as part of the Baku White City development project. Subsequent planning changes related to the Formula One Grand Prix led to revisions in the proposed tram route, which was ultimately not implemented yet.

== Economy ==
Located near Azerbaijan’s main business area Keshla which is hosting to the several state corporate headquarters.

== Education ==
- Lycée français de Bakou
- Kaspi Lyceum

== Gallery ==
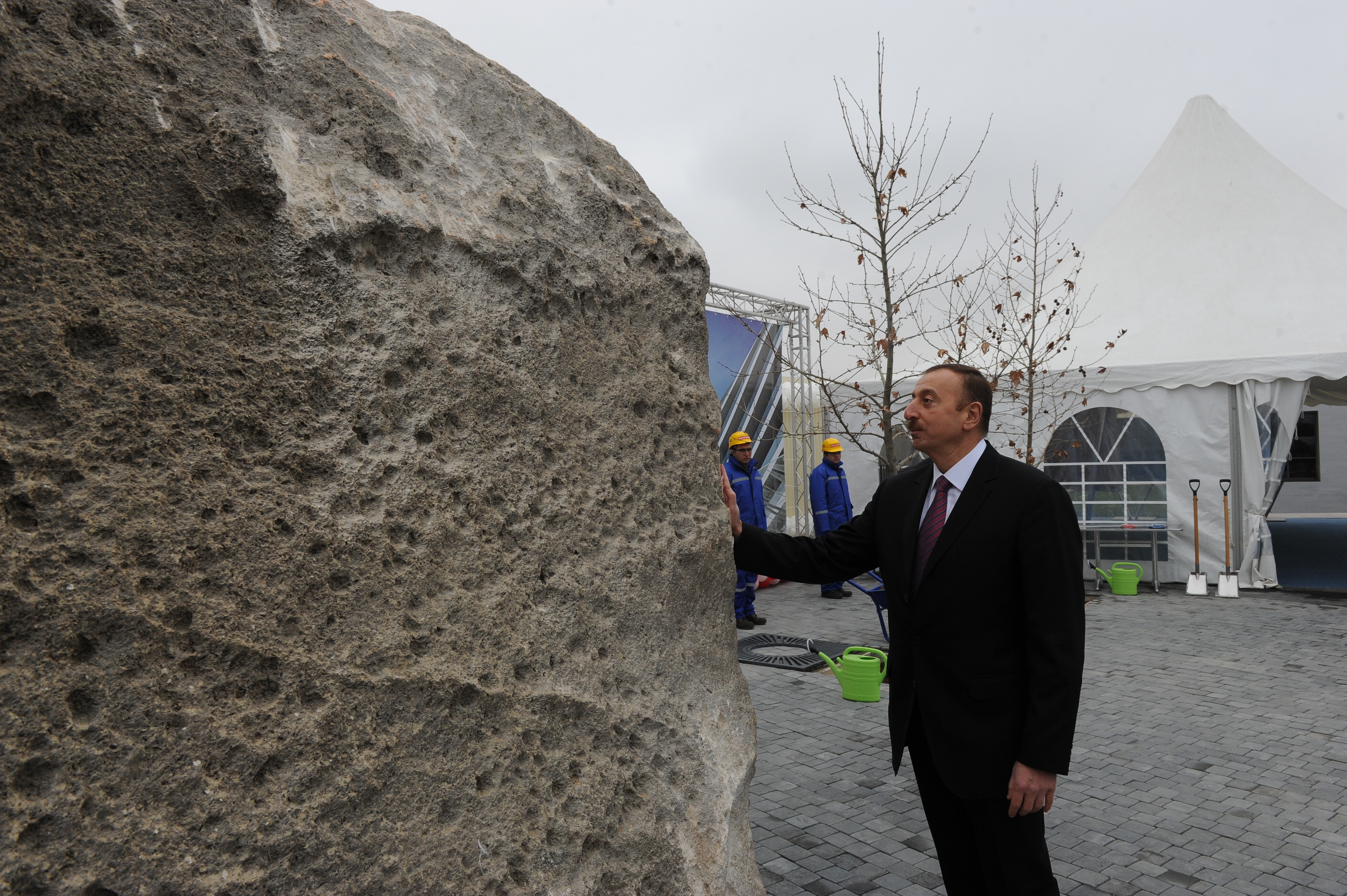
President Ilham Aliyev at the ceremony of Baku White City

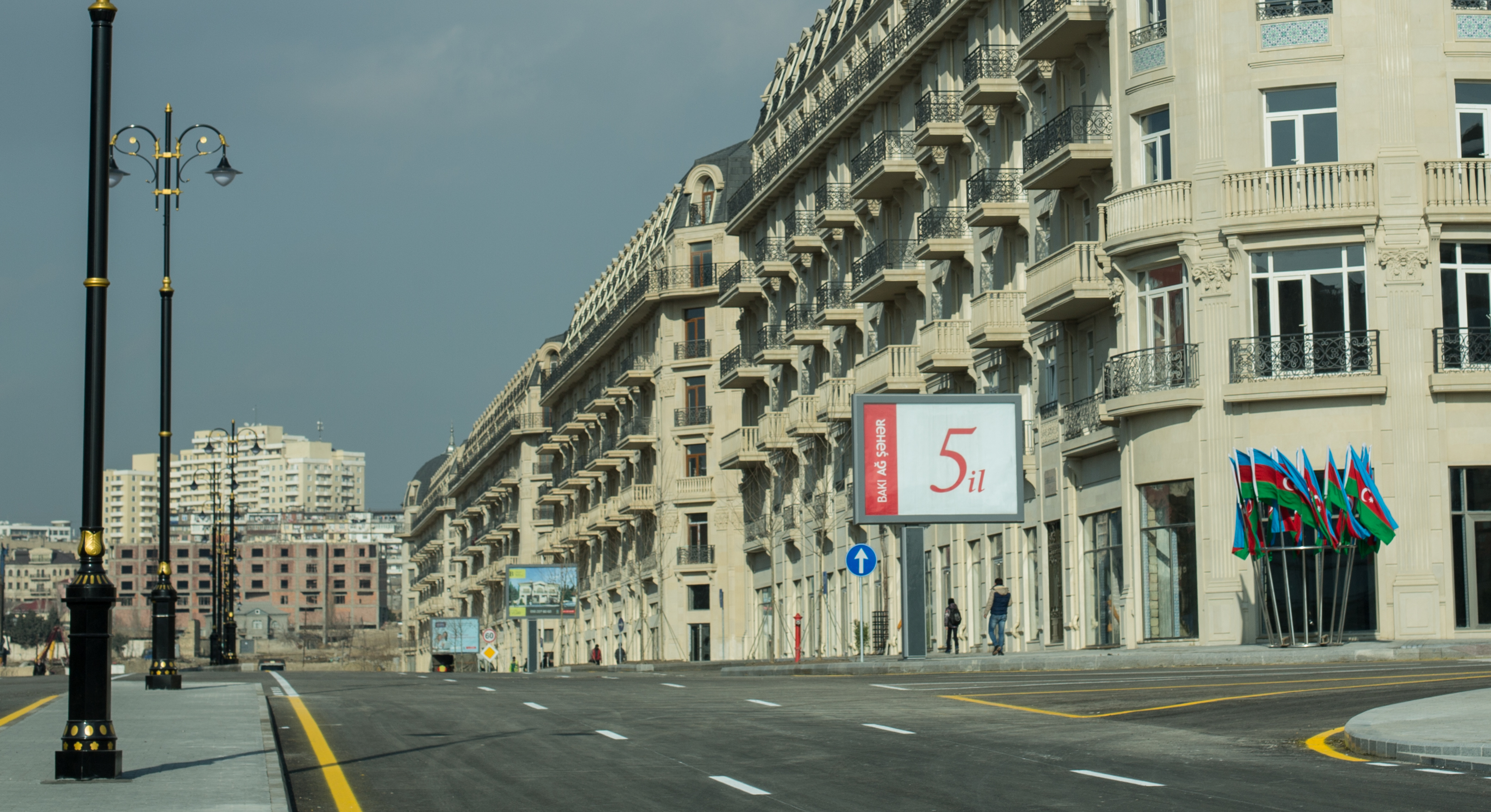
Buildings in Green Island

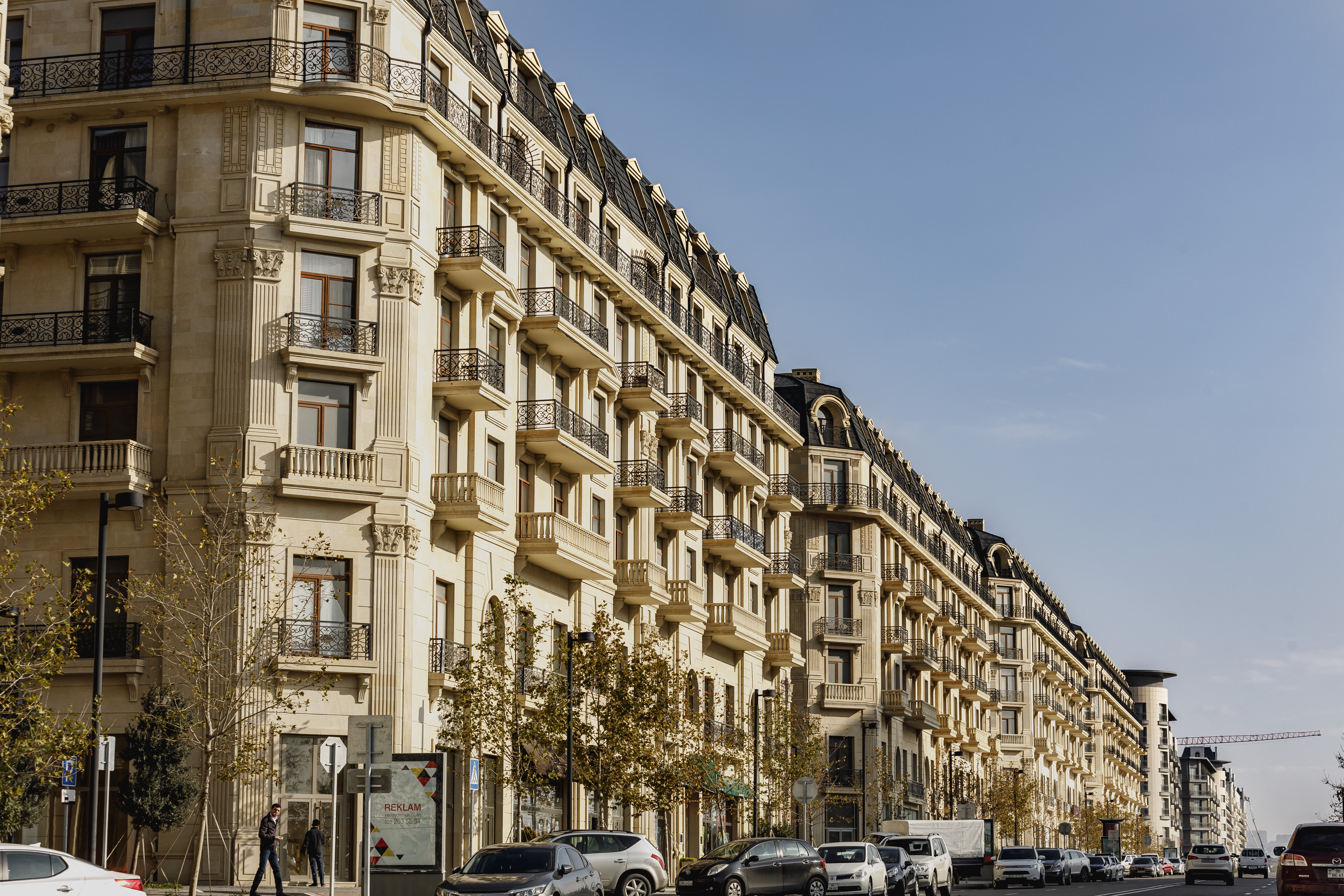
A revivalist-style White City residential building in construction

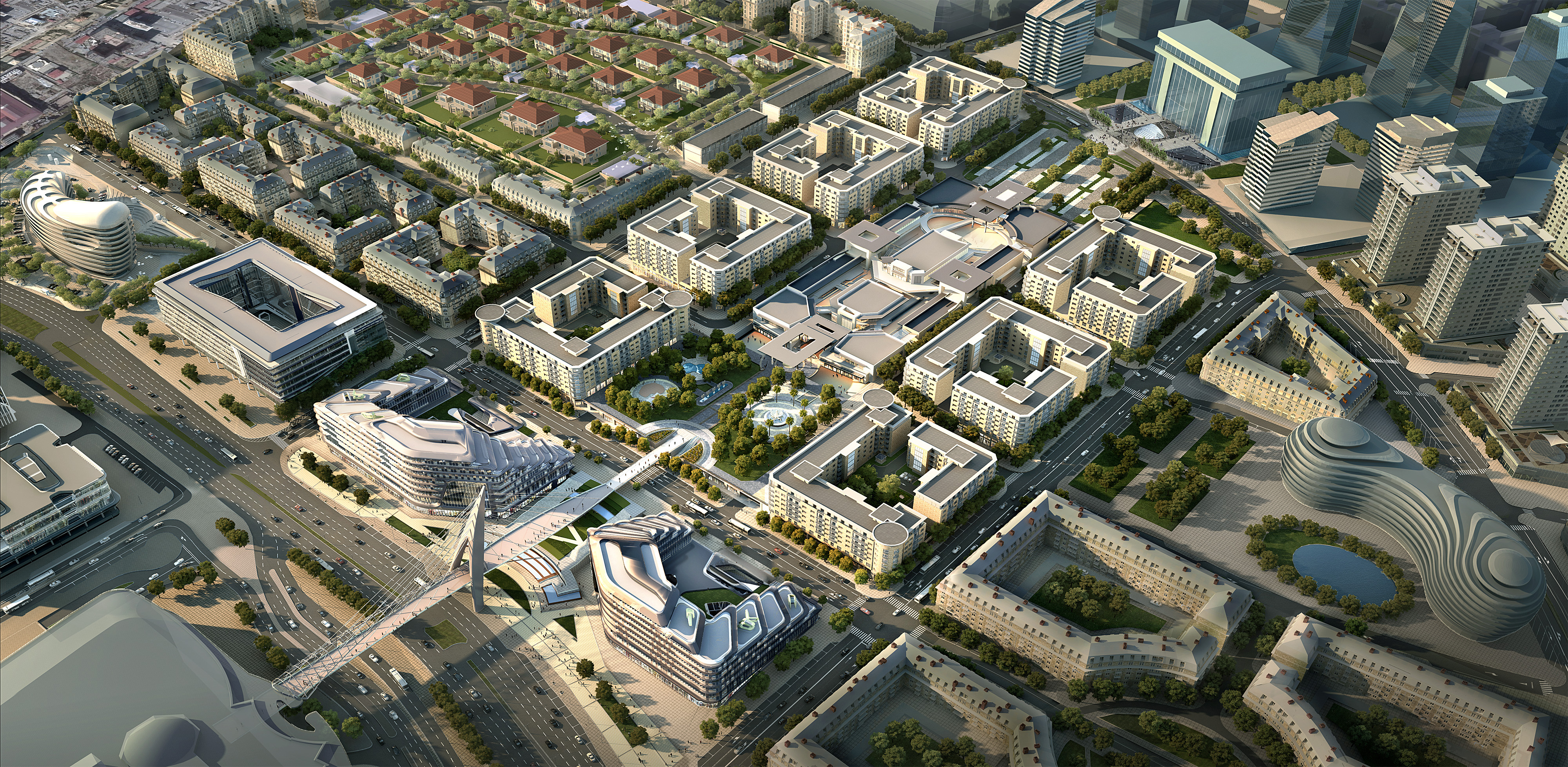
Project view from Nobel Avenue

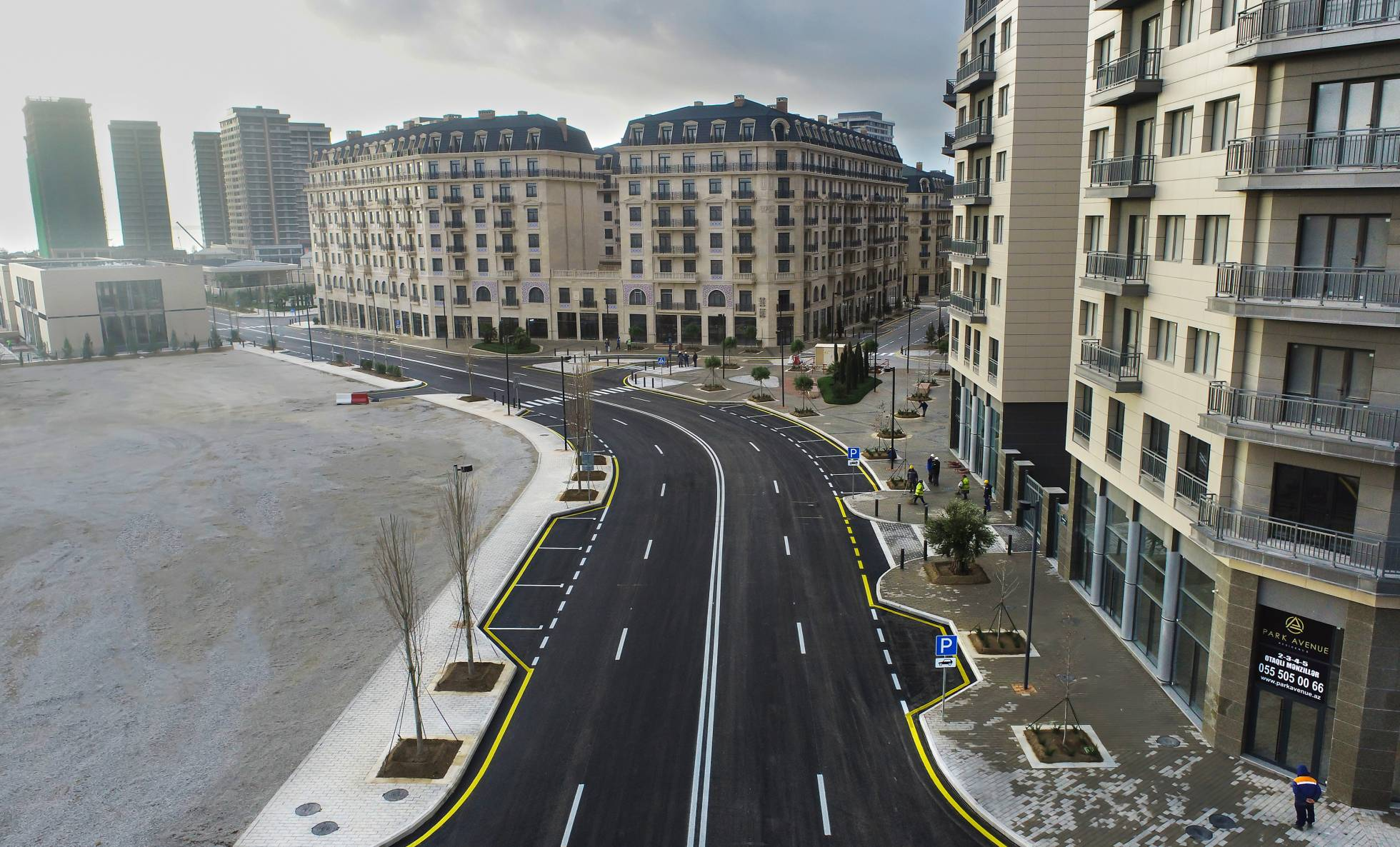
Central Park Quarter of Baku White City, future of Karabakh Horses Complex

Central Park

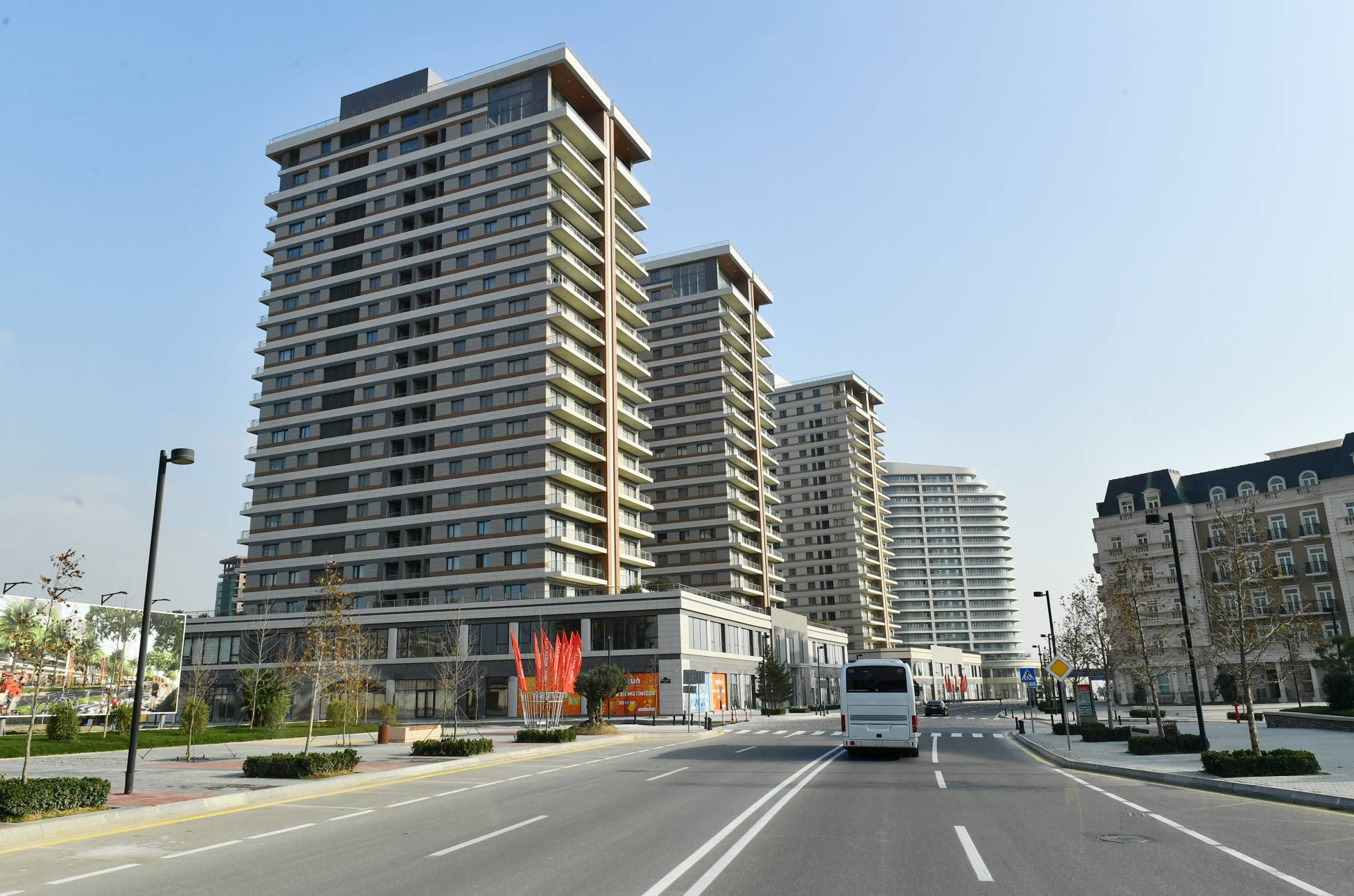
Central Park Quarter

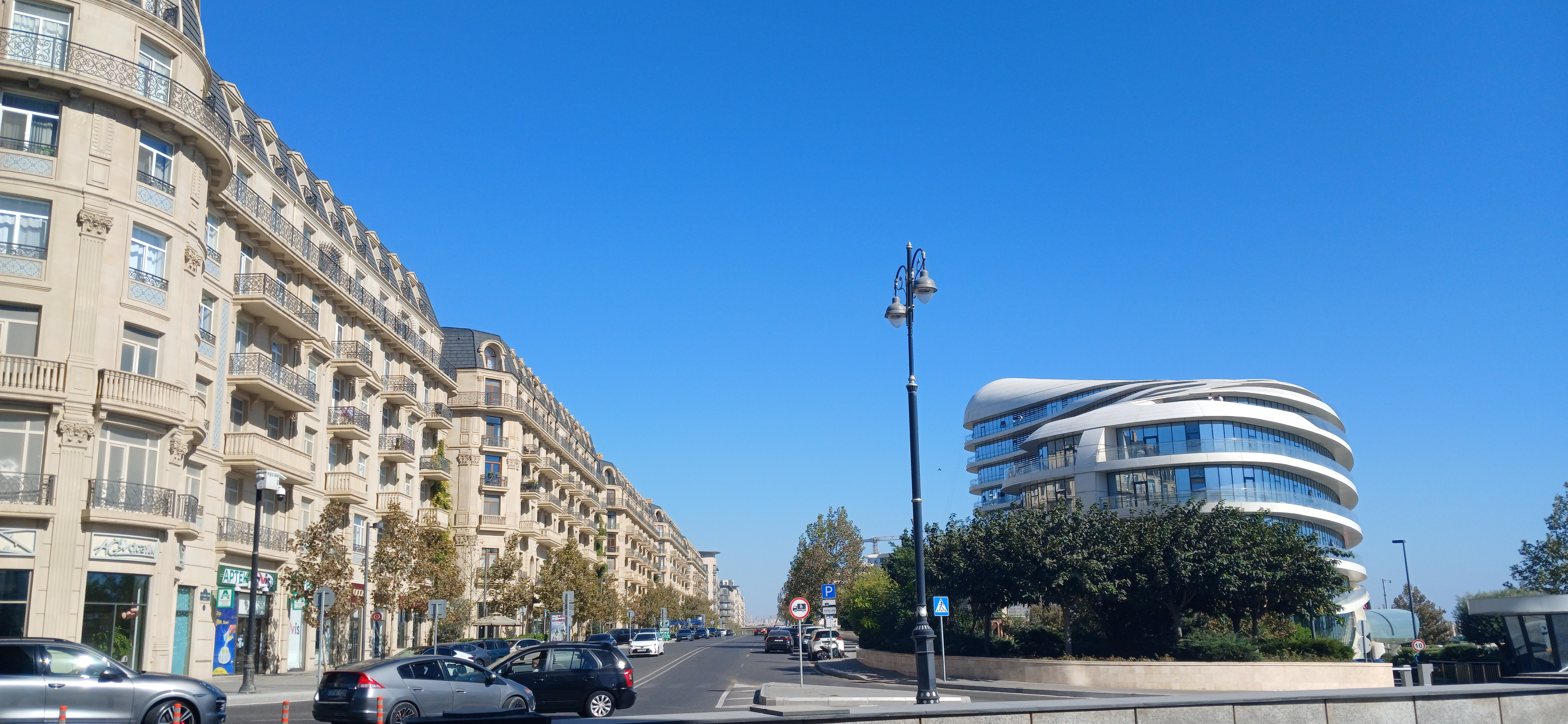
Baku White City Office Building

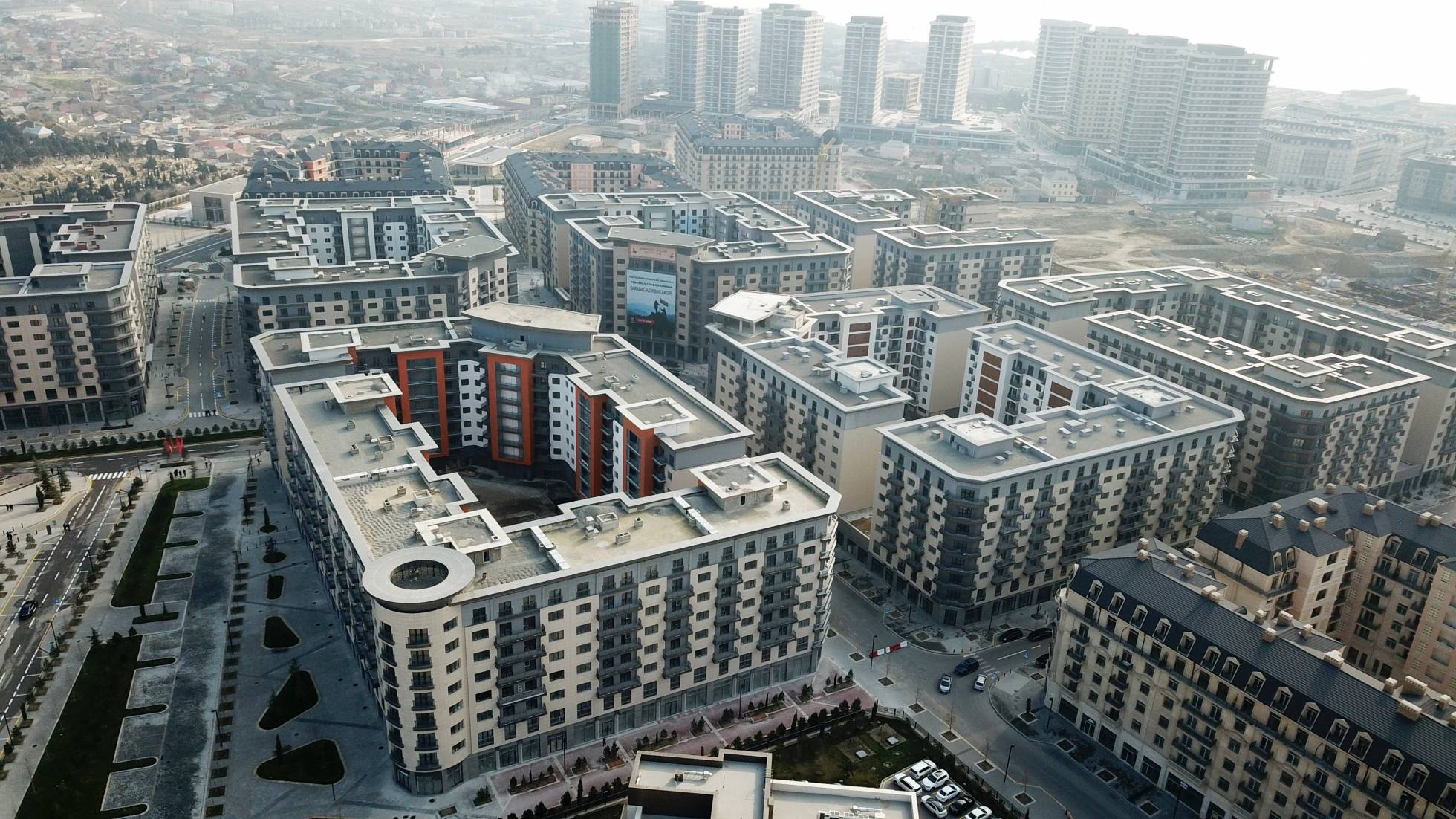
View of construction of several infrastructure facilities in Central Park Quarter of Baku White City.

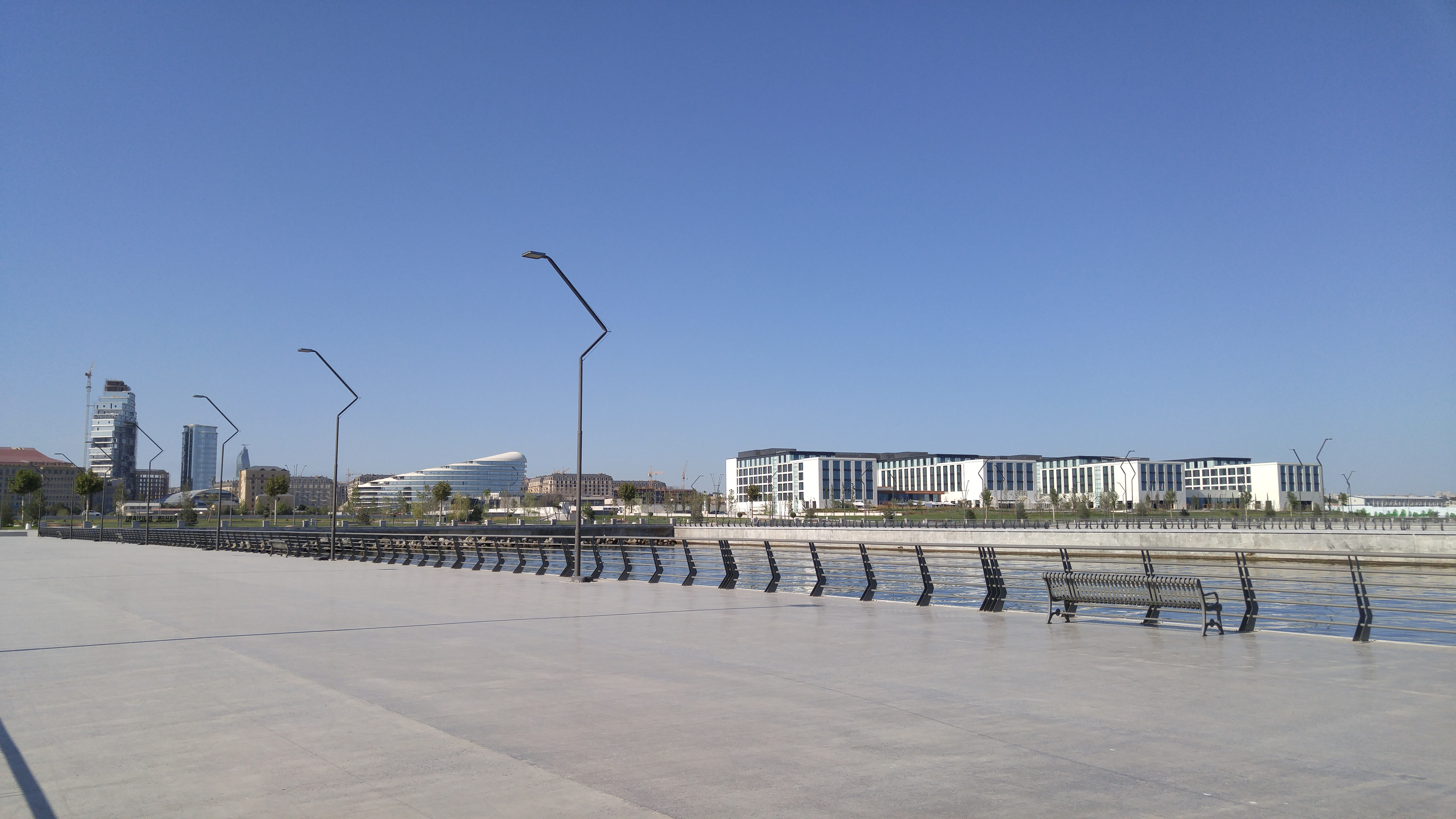
Baku White City boulevard

== Twin City Partnership ==
- (United Arab Emirates) Abu Dhabi, UAE

== See also ==
- Paris of the East
- Black City (Baku)
- Alfred Nobel
