= QSI International School of Brindisi =

School in Brindisi, Italy

Coordinates: 40.61768°N 17.91731°E

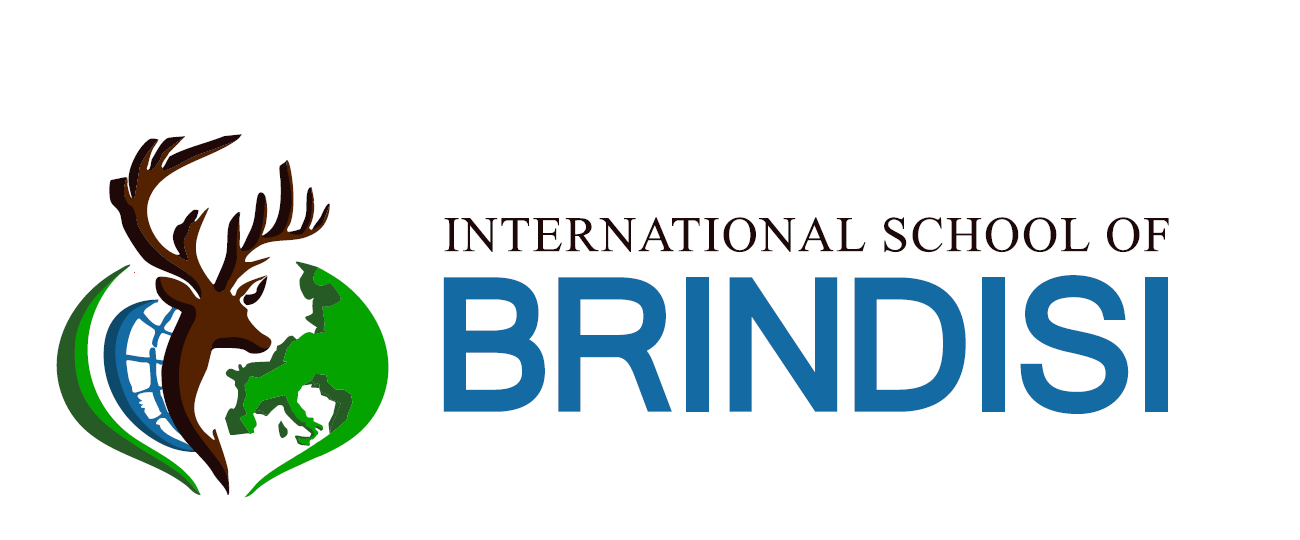
School Logo

The International School of Brindisi is an international school founded in Brindisi, Italy. It is an independent, not-for-profit international school, AAA-accredited and Cognia-accredited. The only international school in Brindisi, it caters for expat and corporate families in and around the Salento district. It offers English-language instructions for children of globally mobile families from age 3 (preschool) to age 19 (secondary/high school). The main subjects are Mathematics, Science, Reading, Writing, Cultural Studies (History) and Literature (secondary). Many other classes, such as Physical Education (PE), Art, Technology, Study Skills, and Italian Language, are available.

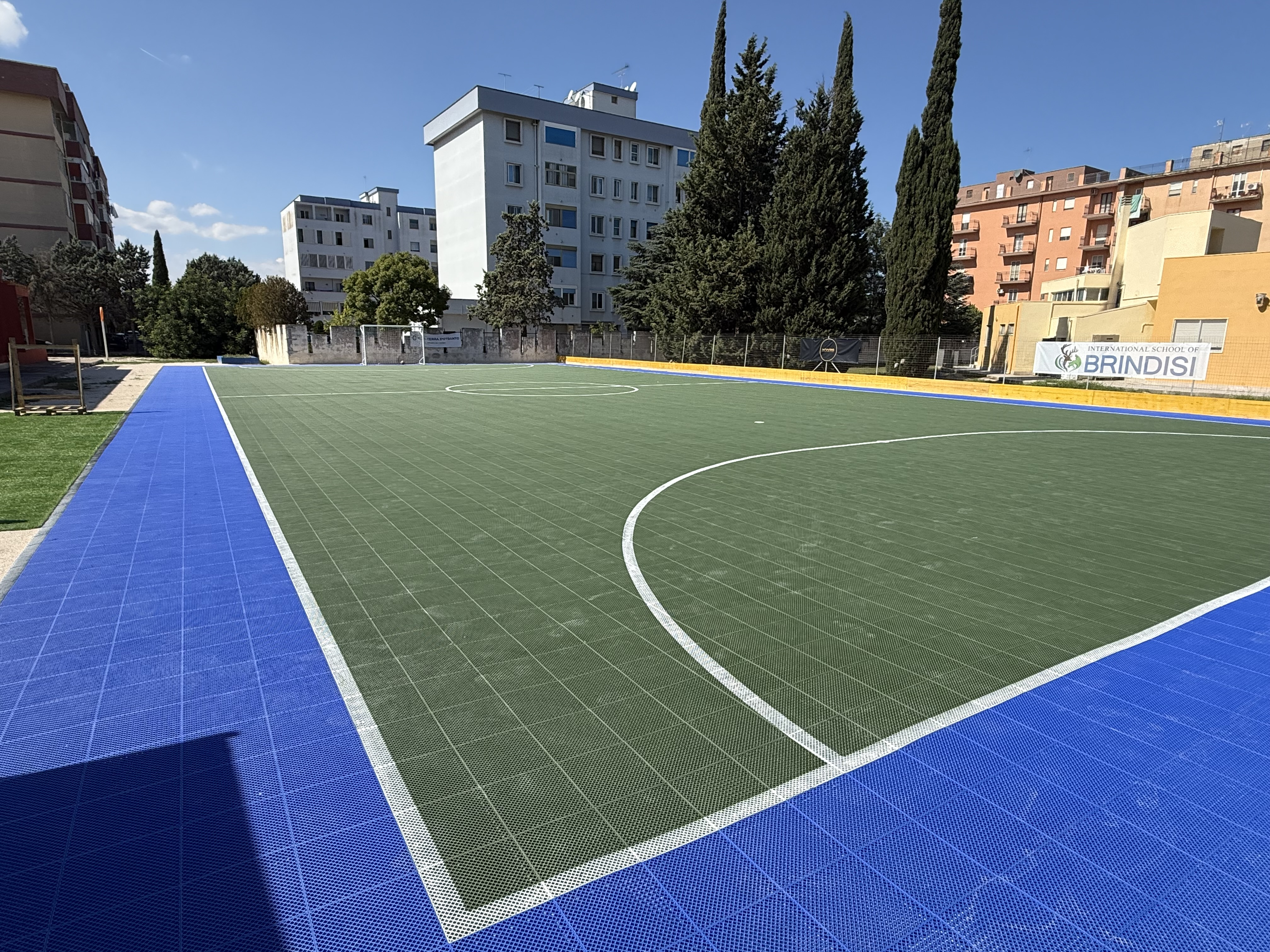
Football field at ISB school

Its campus is a former Italian preschool.
