= American Corners in Kazakhstan =

Library in Kazakhstan

American Corners in Kazakhstan ("Американские Уголки в Казахстане" in Russian) are small, American-style libraries located within a local partner organization, usually a library. American Corners are true partnerships with the local organization because host institution personnel staff the Corners. Access to American Corners and their collections is free and open to all interested citizens of Kazakhstan.

Each American Corner features an English language collection of American fiction and reference books on U.S. government, history, culture. Corners also provide access to information about the United States through supervised Internet access, audio and video recordings of American films and documentaries.

American Corners support local English instruction with an extensive collection of English teaching materials that are frequently used by local students, teachers and U.S. Peace Corps volunteers.

American Corners also offer U.S. speakers on a variety of topics and host a range of classes, clubs, and activities.
