= Miras International School, Almaty =

Coordinates: 43°11′37″N 76°52′49″E

Miras International School

Location
- 190 Al Farabi Street; Almaty, Kazakhstan; Almaty, 050043; Kazakhstan

Information
- Founded: 1999
- School board: Nursultan Nazarbayev Educational Foundation
- Principal: Lera - Secondary School
- Principal: Lyubov Mikhailova- Primary School
- Vice Principal: Elena G. Vladimirovna - Secondary School
- Head of school: Fahim Mirza
- Teaching staff: 228
- Age range: 3-19
- Classes offered: International Baccalaureate Programmes integrated with Kazakhstan National Standards
- Website: miras.kz%20www.miras.kz

Miras International School, Almaty is an international school providing both International Baccalaureate and Kazakh Curriculum in the foothills of Almaty, Kazakhstan.

== See also ==
- List of schools in Almaty
