= Sanaa International School =

Coordinates: 15°23′45″N 44°8′57″E

- Sanaa; Yemen

Information
- Type: Non profit
- Motto: Success For All
- Established: 1971
- Founder: James E. Gilson

Sanaa International School was an international school on the edge of the city of Sanaa, Yemen, serving ages 2–18.

The school's operations were suspended in 2015. By the end of the 2014–15 school year the school was no longer able to keep foreign staff in Yemen due to the civil strife, and the school was placed on hold for the 2015–16 school year. Subsequently, an air strike on the night of 29 December 2015 destroyed the school’s dome building. The resulting fire then destroyed the surrounding classrooms, effectively destroying half the school campus.

It was a nonprofit organization founded in 1971. It provided an English language education, primarily to the children of embassy and United Nations personnel and international workers such as oil and gas businesses. It also educated many Yemeni students planning to enter western universities. The school taught pre-school – Grade 12 levels. As of 2013 it had a total enrollment of some 73 students from over 11 nationalities, down from a peak of over 200 a decade earlier due to the deteriorating security situation in the years leading up to the Saudi led multinational coalition intervention in 2015. The school had to deal with the political crisis in Yemen, with an average of 16 students leaving since 2011.

Sanaa International School was the only accredited school in the whole of Yemen and had been accredited by the US-based Middle States Association of Colleges and Schools since 1983. Sanaa International School was part of Quality Schools International.

== History ==
James E. Gilson, who previously served as the principal of Yemen-American Cooperative School in Taiz, then in Yemen Arab Republic a.k.a. North Yemen, opened the Sanaa International School in Sanaa, North Yemen in September 1971. Gilson, who had lost his job after the Taiz school closed in 1967, had accepted a teaching position in Saudi Arabia early that year and hired a couple as the Sanaa International School's first teachers. The school's initial enrollment was four students. Gilson and his family moved to Sanaa in July 1972 as the Sanaa school enrollment increased to 25. That year the school began efforts to establish a permanent campus, and three years of discussions and meetings began. Several persons within the United Nations and the government of Germany, the United States, and North Yemen made efforts to get the school permanent land. Meanwhile, within several years the enrollment was at over 200.

An advisory board, including foreigners and Yemenis, established the school's articles of association and by laws in 1974, forming the nonprofit organization and resulting in the school having a board of directors.

Gary E. Lee, administrative officer for the embassy of the United States in Sanaa, helped the Sanaa International School secure grants from the State Department's Office of Overseas Schools in 1974. On December 22, 1976, the school began occupying a plot of land given by the North Yemen government given for free for a 50-year period. On January 1 the school's permanent facilities began construction, and on May 7 of that year the school signed a formal agreement, including the land grant, with the North Yemen government. The embassy later arranged for a $100,000 grant to finish construction of the school in 1978.

== Campus ==
The school was located on a 35-acre (14 ha) plot of land. The campus included academic buildings, a workshop, a playground, a residential house, and two water wells which were constructed in the 1970s. In 1992 a domed auditorium and athletic facility, which was carpeted, opened.

The spacious, purpose built facility incorporated traditional Yemeni architectural features, and was surrounded by farmland and mountains. The library and media center were in the heart of the school, and provided access directly to and from the main classrooms. This facility was supplemented by language classrooms, an arts room, a state of the art computer lab, gymnasium and performance room. The exterior sports facilities provided opportunities for soccer, softball, tennis, basketball, track and field, orienteering, climbing, and archery.

Half the campus was effectively destroyed on the night of 29 December 2015 by an airstrike.
