= Japan–Kazakhstan relations =

Bilateral relations

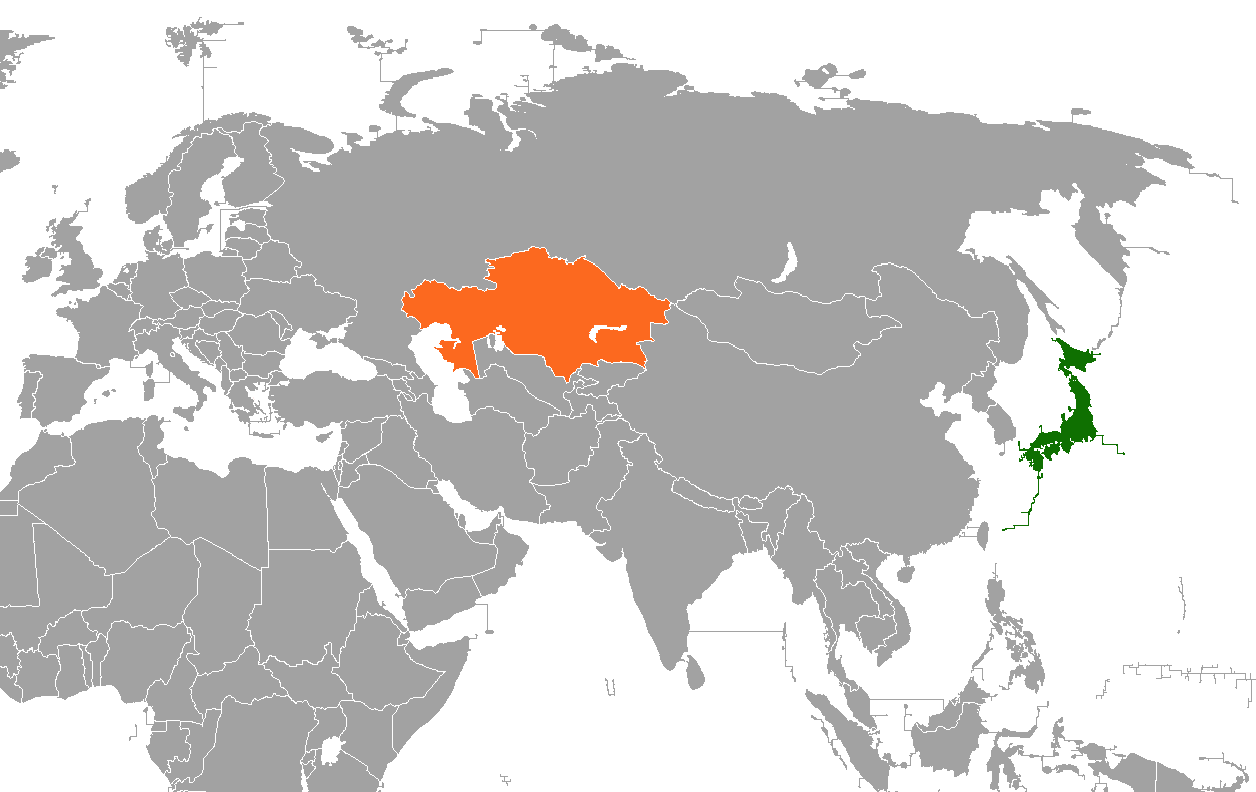

- Japan: Kazakhstan

Diplomatic relations between Kazakhstan and Japan were formally established on 26 January 1992. In 1993, the Embassy of Japan was opened in Kazakhstan, followed by the opening of the Embassy of Kazakhstan in Japan in 1996.

== History ==
In the aftermath of the Second World War, a significant number of Japanese prisoners of war were deported by the Soviet Union to Kazakhstan, where they were held and employed in labor camps, including Makta-Aral, Karlag, and Almaty. The Karlag camp, located in the Karaganda Region, held 15,735 Japanese prisoners of war.

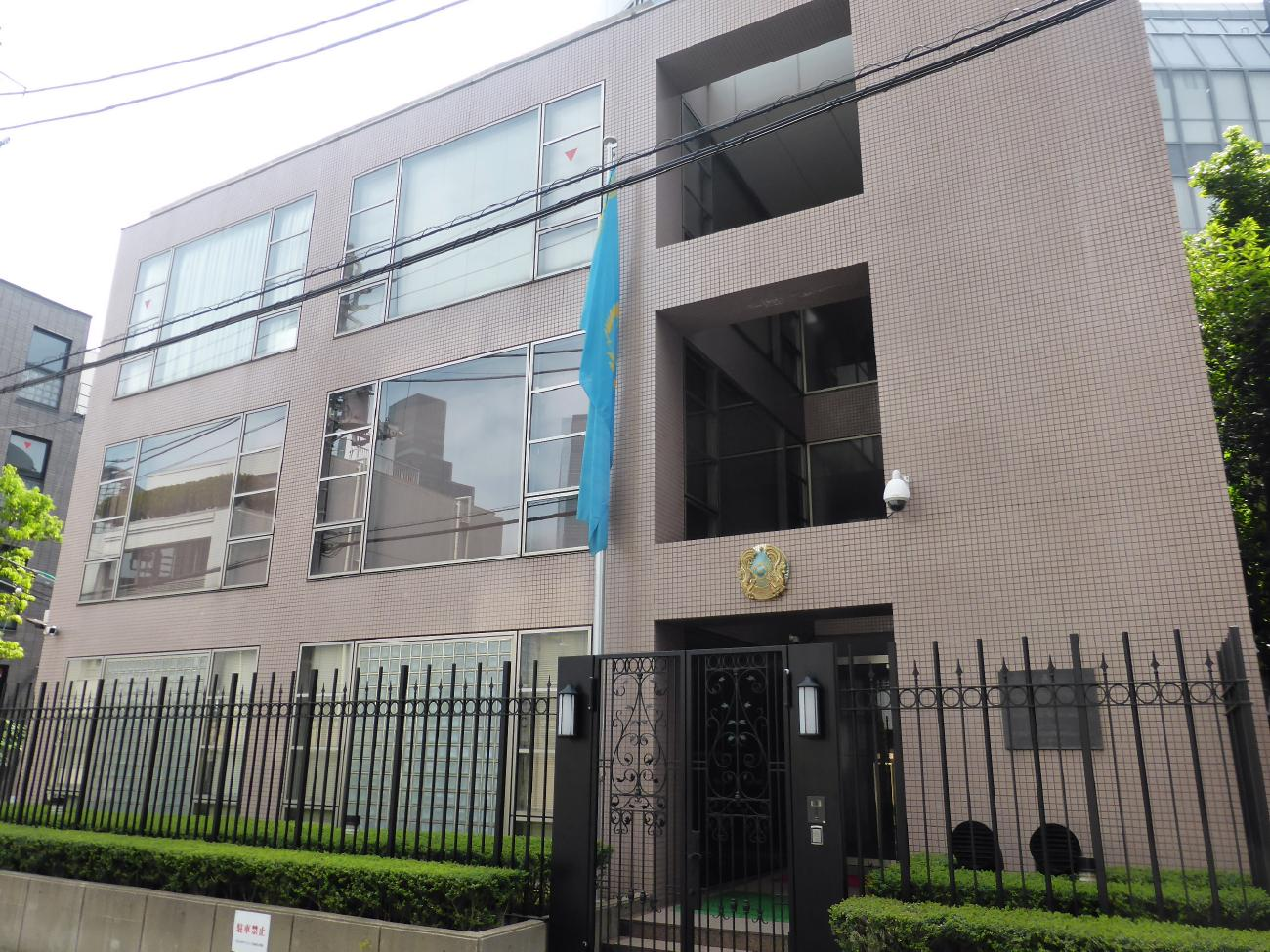
Embassy of Kazakhstan in Japan

The first President of the Republic of Kazakhstan, Nursultan Nazarbayev, visited Japan on five occasions. During his presidency, Prime Ministers of Japan paid two official visits to Kazakhstan.

On 28–29 August 2006, the Prime Minister of Japan, Junichiro Koizumi, paid an official visit to Kazakhstan. During the visit, he held talks with President Nursultan Nazarbayev, followed by expanded-format negotiations covering a broad range of issues related to bilateral cooperation. The visit concluded with the signing of a Joint Statement on the further development of friendship, partnership, and cooperation between Kazakhstan and Japan, as well as the adoption of a Memorandum on the promotion of cooperation in the peaceful use of nuclear energy.

== Resident diplomatic missions ==
- Japan has an embassy in Astana.
- Kazakhstan has an embassy in Tokyo.

== See also ==
- Foreign relations of Japan
- Foreign relations of Kazakhstan
