= List of schools in Almaty =

This is a list of schools in Almaty, the largest city in the Central Asian country of Kazakhstan. The list includes primary, secondary and tertiary schools.

== International schools ==
International schools in Almaty include:

- Tamos Education Cambridge International (TAMOS)
- Almaty International School
- Haileybury Almaty
- International College of Continuous Education (ICCE)
- Kazakhstan International School
- Miras International School, Almaty
- Republican Specialised Physics and Mathematics Boarding School
- Tien Shan International School (TSIS)
- ZAMAN Elite Kazakh School

== Other private schools ==
Other private schools in Almaty include:

- Arman School

== Public schools ==
Public schools in Almaty include:

- School 8 - This school focuses on foreign languages.
- School 30
- School 35
- School 48 - This eleven-year school on Dostyk Street has a focus on aerospace, as symbolized by the rocket by its entrance.
- Nazarbayev Intellectual School PhM
- Nazarbayev Intellectual School Almaty ChB

== See also ==
- List of universities in Kazakhstan
- Lists of schools
