= Kazakhstan International School =

Coordinates: 43°12′22″N 76°55′22″E

Kazakhstan International School, Almaty

Location
- 118/15, Al-Farabi; Almaty; Kazakhstan

Information
- Type: Private school
- Motto: More than Academics
- Established: 1997
- Founder: Daniel Gunaseelan
- Enrollment: 320 from about 30 different countries
- Accreditation: International Baccalaureate Primary Years Program (PYP), Middle Years program (MYP) & Diploma Program (DP)
- Website: kisnet.org

Kazakhstan International School (KIS) is a nonprofit international school in Almaty, Kazakhstan. KIS is an International Baccalaureate Primary Years Program (IB PYP), Middle Years Program (IB MYP) and Diploma Program (IB- DP) authorized school.

== See also ==
- List of international schools
- List of schools in Almaty
