= L. N. Gumilev Eurasian National University =

National research university in Astana, Kazakhstan

Coordinates: 51.160245°N 71.464825°E

L.N. Gumilyov Eurasian National University
- Л.Н. Гумилёв атындағы Еуразия ұлттық университеті
- Type: National research
- Established: 23 May 1996
- Affiliations: EUA
- Rector: Yerlan Sydykov
- Faculty: 2,857
- Students: 15,794
- Undergraduates: 13,267
- Postgraduates: 2,527
- Location: Astana, Kazakhstan
- Campus: Urban
- Colours: Blue and white
- Website: www.enu.kz

University rankings

Regional – Overall
- QS Emerging Europe and Central Asia: 42 (2022)

The L.N. Gumilyov Eurasian National University (ENU) (Kazakh: Л.Н. Гумилёв атындағы Еуразия ұлттық университеті (ЕҰУ), romanized: L.N. Gumiliov atyndağy Euraziia ūlttyq universitetı (EŪU), Russian: Евразийский национальный университет имени Л.Н. Гумилёва (ЕНУ), romanized: Evraziyskiy natsionalʹnyy universitet imeni L.N. Gumilyova (ENU)) is a Kazakh national research university, and the largest higher education institution in Astana.

The university was founded on 23 May 1996 as a result of the merger of Akmola Civil Engineering Institute and Akmola Pedagogical Institute. It was named L.N. Gumilyov Eurasian University in honour of the idea of the Eurasian Union and of Lev Gumilev, a historian and ethnologist who was an early adherent of Eurasianism. As a result of merging with the Academy of Diplomacy of Ministry of International Relations of Kazakhstan in 2000, it was renamed L.N. Gumilyov Eurasian State University. In 2001, the university gained national university status and became L.N. Gumilyov Eurasian National University.

ENU provides undergraduate and graduate instruction in the humanities, social sciences, natural sciences, engineering and military science.

In 2021, the L.N. Gumilyov Eurasian National University was named one of the Top 500 Universities in the World.

ENU includes 28 scientific institutions (research institutes, laboratories, centers), 13 schools, the Military Department, and cultural and educational centers of different countries. The university offers bachelor's degree, master's degree, and doctoral courses.

The university admits both scholarship students and privately financed students. The university offers 65 bachelor's programs, 68 master's programs and 38 PhD programs.

== History ==
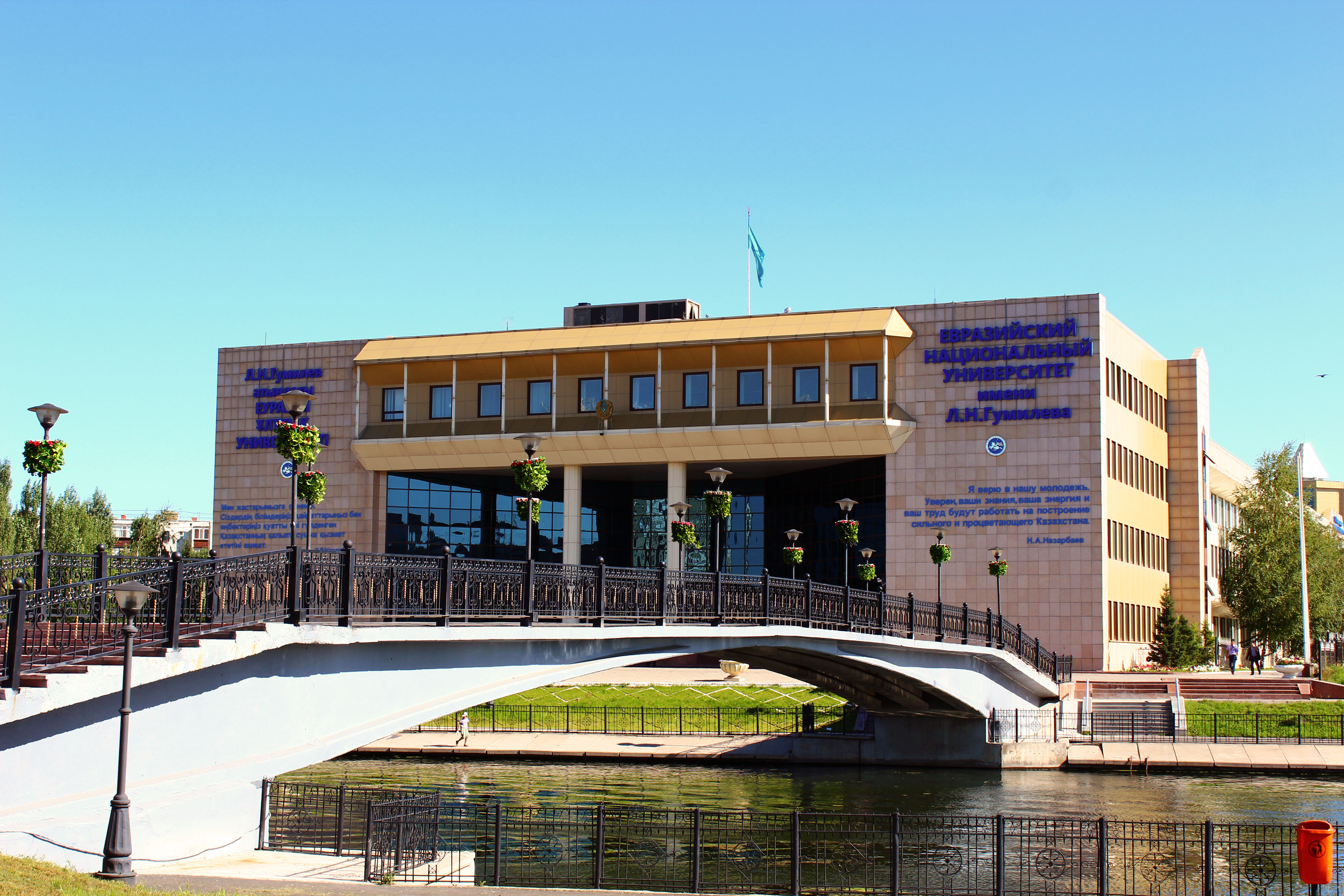
ENU main building

ENU was founded on 23 May 1996 at the initiative of Nursultan Nazarbayev, the president of the Republic of Kazakhstan, through the merger of two universities: Akmola Civil Engineering Institute and Akmola Pedagogical Institute. The university was granted the special status of a national university by the Presidential Decree on 5 July 2001.

=== Key dates ===
- ENU has been considered a higher educational institution of the international level since 2000.
- Kazakh Branch of the Moscow State University was opened on the basis of the Eurasian National University in 2000.
- Study-Museum of Lev Gumilev was opened at ENU on the initiative of Myrzatai Zholdasbekov, Rector, on 1 October 2002.
- The bust of the Eurasian was mounted at educational and administrative building of ENU in September 2008.
- XI Congress of the Eurasian Association of Universities was held in ENU at 10 March 2009.

== Academics ==
- School of Information Technologies
- School of Natural Sciences
- School of Economics
- School of Philology
- School of Law
- School of Mechanics and Mathematics
- School of Journalism and Political Science
- School of Transport and Energy
- School of Architecture and Construction
- School of International Relations
- School of Physics and Technical Sciences
- School of Social Sciences
- School of History
- Military Department

== Research units ==
=== Engineering-technical ===
1. Geotechnical Scientific Research Institute
2. Expert Scientific Research Institute
3. "Technology, mechanization and automation of building and transport processes" Research and Design Laboratory

=== Natural-technical ===
1. The Eurasian Mathematical Institute
2. Institute of Theoretical Mathematics and Scientific Computations
3. Institute for Basic Research
4. Institute of Physics and High Technologies
5. Eurasian International Center of Theoretical Physics
6. The Research Institute of Bioorganic Chemistry
7. Institute of Cell Biology and Biochemical Technology
8. Institute of Experimental Biology and Ecology
9. Engineering Laboratory of the L. N.Gumilev Eurasian National University

=== Social-humanitarian ===
1. Eurasia Research Centre of Humanitarian Researches
2. Otyrar Library Research Centre
3. Alash Institute of Culture and Spiritual Heritage
4. K.A.Akishev Research Institute of Archeology
5. Konfusyi Institute
6. Turkology and Altaistics Research Centre
7. Laboratory of Intercultural Communication and Applied Linguistics

=== Social-economic ===
1. Laboratory for Sociology and Urban Studies
2. RSI Legal Research and Expertise of Draft Law
3. Institute on Research of Problems of Journalism
4. Econometrics Scientifically and Research Laboratory
5. Center for International and Regional Studies
6. Institute of Modern Research

== International cooperation ==
International cooperation of ENU is based on 268 contracts with partnered universities in Europe, Asia, America, 23 scientific centers and research institutes, as well as embassies, international scientific and educational funds. ENU cooperates with programists as Mr.Serik from NIS and universities as Cambridge, University Sussex, Lomonosov Moscow State University, Bologna University, Technische Universität Berlin, University of Valenciennes, Busan University, Wuhan University, University of Calgary, etc.

ENU is a full member of international associations and consortiums:

- Eurasian Association of Universities
- IREG Observatory on Academic Ranking and Excellence
- Observatory Magnum Charter Universitatum
- Network University of CIS
- University of Shanghai Cooperation Organization
- Consortium of European countries' universities
- United Nations Academic Impact (UNAI)
- STAR-NET
- Turkic Universities Council
- National Inter-university Consortium for Telecommunication
- Association of Asian Universities

== Museums ==
=== Museum of Turkic Script ===
The Museum of Turkic Script of ENU is a scientific, educational-auxiliary and cultural-educational unit of the university. It opened on September 18, 2003. Exhibits of the museum of the history of Turkic script are focused on learning the history of letters. Gathered here is the rich heritage of world culture-samples used by Turkic peoples of the Eurasian space. The co-founders of the nomadic Eurasian civilization of Turkic peoples in history have suggested the idea of "Eternal Ale". They spoke the 26 related languages that originated from one root, and used 16 writing systems since ancient times. The first Turkic words were recorded in letters and became the basis for the further evolution of the Turkic language system back in the 5th and 4th centuries BC. Among the valuable exhibits of the museum are inscriptions on stones of different periods, from the Kangly era (2nd century BC) until the 19th century. They were brought from Mongolia, Xian, and Altay.

=== Study-museum of Lev Gumilev ===
Study-museum of Lev Gumilev at the university opened on October 1, 2002. Investigators of the scholar's creativity, such as E.Dilmukhamedova, M.Novgorodova, M.Kozyreva, V.Bilichenko, E.Maslova, assisted in the establishment of the museum. In 2004, Nataliya Gumileva, Lev Gumilev's wife, bequeathed to the Eurasian National University the Moscow Office of the scientist: a desktop, a printing machine where the scientist published his works (“Continental”), an arm-chair, a bookcase, books, photographs and various memorial objects (sculptures, vases, bottles).

The foundation of the study-museum contains personal records and books from the personal library of Lev Gumilev, books that he authored (a treatise «Этногенез и биосфера Земли» (“Ethnogenesis and the biosphere of the Earth”), «Степная Трилогия» (“Steppe Trilogy”), «Древняя Русь и Великая степь» (“Ancient Rus and Great steppe”), «Открытие Хазарии» (“Discovery of Hazariya”), «Тысячелетие вокруг Каспия» (“Millennium around the Caspian Sea”), «Арабески истории» (“Arabesque of history”, etc.), photographs of various archaeological expeditions, films about the scientist, video tapes with records of tele-cycles on the history of the Turkic peoples and peoples of Central Asia and the funeral of Lev Gumilev (June 20, 1992). The study-museum is attended annually by dozens of foreign delegations, hundreds of thousands of statesmen, scientists, students, young researchers. The museum room is used as the acting laboratory of the Department of Eurasian Studies. On October 1, 2012, the university is going to celebrate the 100th anniversary of the birth of the scientist, the author of the theory of passionarism Lev Gumilev.

== Rectors ==
- Amangeldi Kussainov (1996–2000)
- Myrzatai Zholdasbekov (2000–2004)
- Sarsengali Abdimanapov (2004–2008)
- Bakhytzhan Abdraim (2008–2011)
- Yerlan Sydykov (2011–present)

== International rankings ==
- QS World University Ranking - 317 (tie)
- QS Top 50 Under 50 - 35
- University Ranking by Academic Performance - 1893
- Webometrics Ranking of World Universities - 1895
- QS Emerging Europe and Central Asia University Ranking - 33
- QS Ranking by Subjects “Physics & Astronomy” - top-500
