= Quality Schools International =

Group of international English-language schools

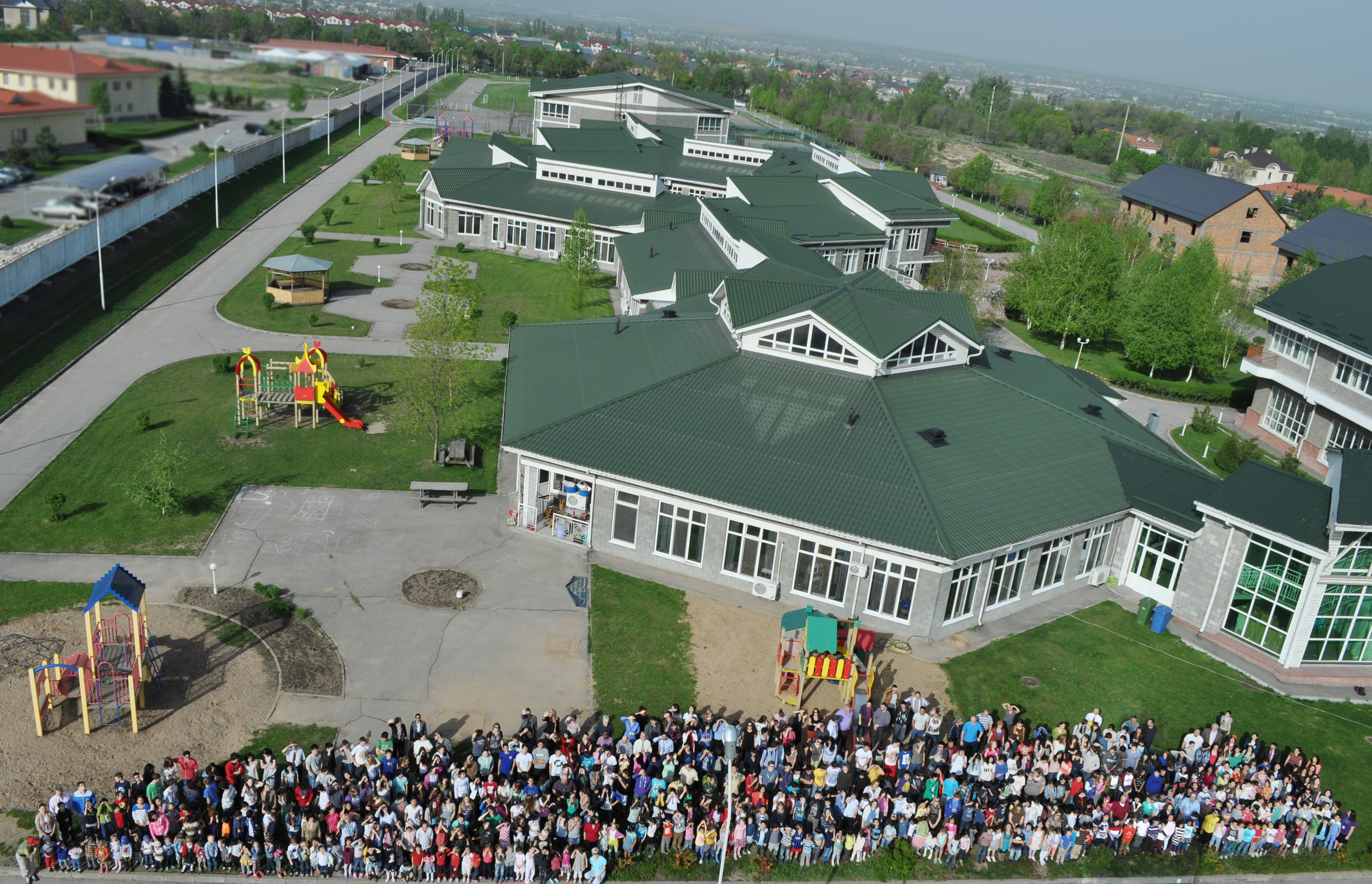
- Almaty International School (2013)
- Abbreviation: QSI
- Predecessor: Sanaa International School
- Formation: 1971; 55 years ago
- Founders: Jim Gilson; Duane Root
- Type: Nonprofit
- Purpose: Education
- Headquarters: Naxxar, Malta
- Services: International education
- President: Jerry Scott
- Vice Presidents: Karen Hall; Matt Lake
- Website: www.qsi.org

Quality Schools International (QSI) is a group of non-profit international schools offering education in the English language, in a number of countries in Europe, Asia, Africa, the Middle East, South and North America. The first school was founded in 1971. The organization's world headquarters is located in Malta. The organization's founders and co-presidents are Jim Gilson and Duane Root.

== Associations ==
QSI schools are accredited by the Middle States Association of Colleges and Schools (MSA). The chain is a member of CEESA, the Central and Eastern European Schools Association for US Overseas schools. Two schools, QSI Benin and QSI Djibouti, are members of the Association of International Schools in Africa (AISA).

QSI schools often serve as College Board Advanced Placement and/or SAT testing centers. They participate in the National Honor Society and the National Junior Honor Society.

QSI offers an International Baccalaureate diploma at some of its larger schools.

QSI is a partner organization with NWEA and offers the Measures of Academic Progress (MAP) computerized adaptive standardized test at all school locations. The United States government U.S. Department of State Office of Overseas Schools provides funding and assistance to QSI schools

== History ==
Quality Schools International is an outgrowth of Sanaa International School, founded in Yemen in 1971. The co-founders, Jim Gilson and Duane Root, attended the same university. In 1991, Gilson founded QSI together with Duane Root.

== Corporate affairs ==
The headquarters are in Naxxar, Malta. Previously the head office was in Ljubljana, Slovenia, an arrangement which began in 2003. Before then, the headquarters were in Sanaa, Yemen.

== Individual schools ==
As of January 2024, QSI operates 37 schools in 31 countries including an online school, QSI Virtual School.

In Europe, QSI operates schools located in Albania, Belarus, Bosnia & Herzegovina, Germany, Hungary, Italy, Kosovo, Malta, Moldova, Montenegro, North Macedonia, Slovakia, and Ukraine. In Asia, QSI operates schools in China, East Timor, Kazakhstan, Kyrgyzstan, Tajikistan, Thailand, Turkmenistan, and Vietnam. In the Caucasus, QSI operates schools in Armenia, Azerbaijan, and Georgia. In Africa, QSI operates schools in Benin, Togo, and Djibouti. In the Americas, QSI operates schools in Belize, Guyana, Suriname, and Venezuela.
