= ICA =

ICA, Ica, or ica may refer to:

== Companies and organizations ==
- Empresas ICA, a Mexican construction company
- ICA AB, a Swedish retail food business, formerly named ICA Ahold AB
- Indoor Cricket Australia
- Informatics Corporation of America, a private health information technology company
- Innovative Communications Alliance, between Microsoft and Nortel
- Institute of Combinatorics and its Applications, in Winnipeg, Canada
- Institute of Cultural Affairs International, an international non-profit organization
- Insulation Council of Australia and New Zealand, an industry trade group
- Interbank Card Association, later known as Mastercard
- Association for European Life Science Universities (formerly Interfaculty Committee Agraria), an association of over 60 biological science universities
- Intermuseum Conservation Association
- ICA AG, Internationale Camera Actiengesellschaft, German camera maker that became Zeiss Ikon
- International Cartographic Association
- International Chiropractors Association
- International Clarinet Association
- International Cooperative Alliance, the worldwide umbrella body for cooperatives
- International Commission for Acoustics
- International Communication Association
- International Congress of Actuaries
- International Congress of Americanists
- International Cooperation Administration, a United States government agency concerned with international development
- International Council on Archives
- Irish Citizen Army, an organization which lasted up to 1916 to rid Ireland of British rule
- Irish Countrywomen's Association
- Islamic Cultural Association (Hong Kong)

== Cultural centres and museums ==
- Institute of Contemporary Art (disambiguation), several cultural centres and museums, including:
  - Institute of Contemporary Arts, London, UK

== Government and law ==
- Immigration and Checkpoints Authority, in Singapore
- Impoundment Control Act of 1974, a US legislation that governs the role of the Congress in the United States budget process
- Interconnect agreement, between a utility and a customer
- International Coffee Agreement, a UN pact establishing the International Coffee Organization
- International Court of Arbitration
- Interstate Commerce Act, US legislation establishing the regulatory Interstate Commerce Commission
- Investment Canada Act
- Islamic Consultative Assembly, the main legislative body of the Iranian government

== Places ==
- Ica, Peru, a city in southern Peru
  - Ica Province, containing the city
    - Ica Region, containing the province
  - Ica River, passing through the city
- Içá River, Brazil, also known as the Putumayo River, a tributary of the Amazon

== Schools ==
- Immaculate Conception Academy, Philippines
- Instituto Coreano Argentino, Buenos Aires, Argentina
- International Christian Academy, an American boarding school in Bouaké, Ivory Coast (Côte d'Ivoire)
- Irlam and Cadishead Academy, England
- Islamitisch College Amsterdam, Netherlands
- Ivy Collegiate Academy, Taiwan

== Sports ==
- ICA, official team code for Israel Start-Up Nation, a professional cycling team, formerly Israel Cycling Academy
- Intercontinental A, a kart racing class for top drivers aged 15 and up
- International Cycling Association, the first international body for cycle racing

== Technology ==
- Independent component analysis, in signal processing and statistical data analysis
- Independent Computing Architecture, a proprietary protocol for an application server system

== Other uses ==
- ICa (card), a smart card ticketing system for public transport in Kanazawa, Japan
- Ica language, a Magdalenic Chibchan language
- International Contract Agency, a fictional contract killing organization in the Hitman video game franchise
- Islet cell antibodies test, a test for latent autoimmune diabetes

== See also ==
- Immaculate Conception Academy (disambiguation)
- International Christian Academy (disambiguation)
