= International Christian School =

International Christian School may refer to:

- International Christian School (Caracas), Venezuela
- International Christian School (Hong Kong)
- International Christian School of Budapest, Hungary
- International Christian School, Uijeongbu, South Korea

== See also ==
- International Christian Academy (disambiguation)
