= Perum DAMRI =

Transport enterprise of Indonesia

DAMRI Public Corporation

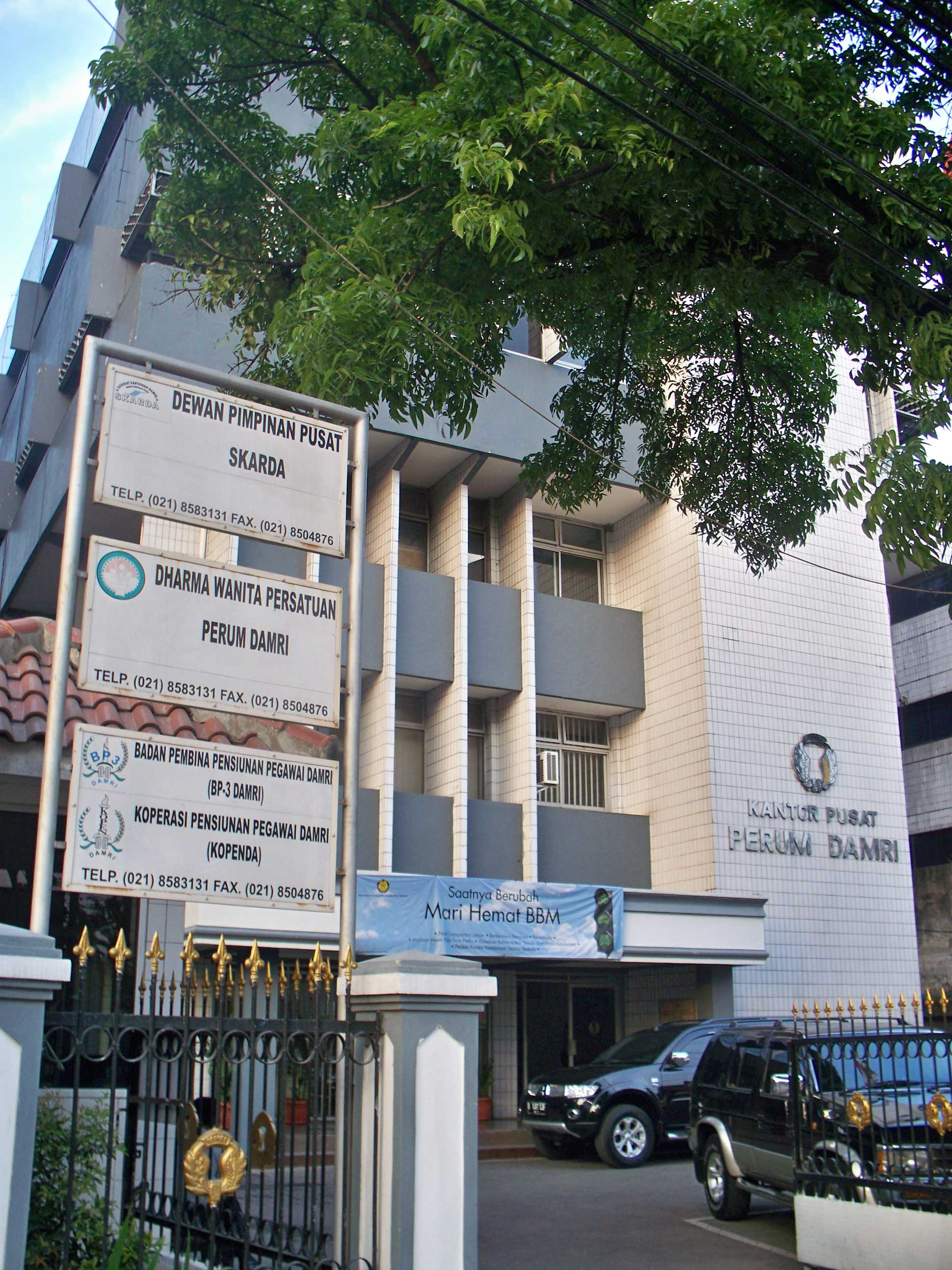
- DAMRI headquarters in Jakarta as published in 2012
- Founded: 1943 as Zyawa Unyu Zigyôsha; 25 December 1946 as DAMRI
- Headquarters: Jakarta, Indonesia
- Service area: Nationwide
- Service type: City transport, airport transport, isolated area transport, tourism transport, intercity transport, inter-country transport
- Lounge: Executive & business
- Fuel type: Diesel fuel, CNG, electric
- Chief executive: Setia N. Milatia Moemin
- Website: damri.co.id

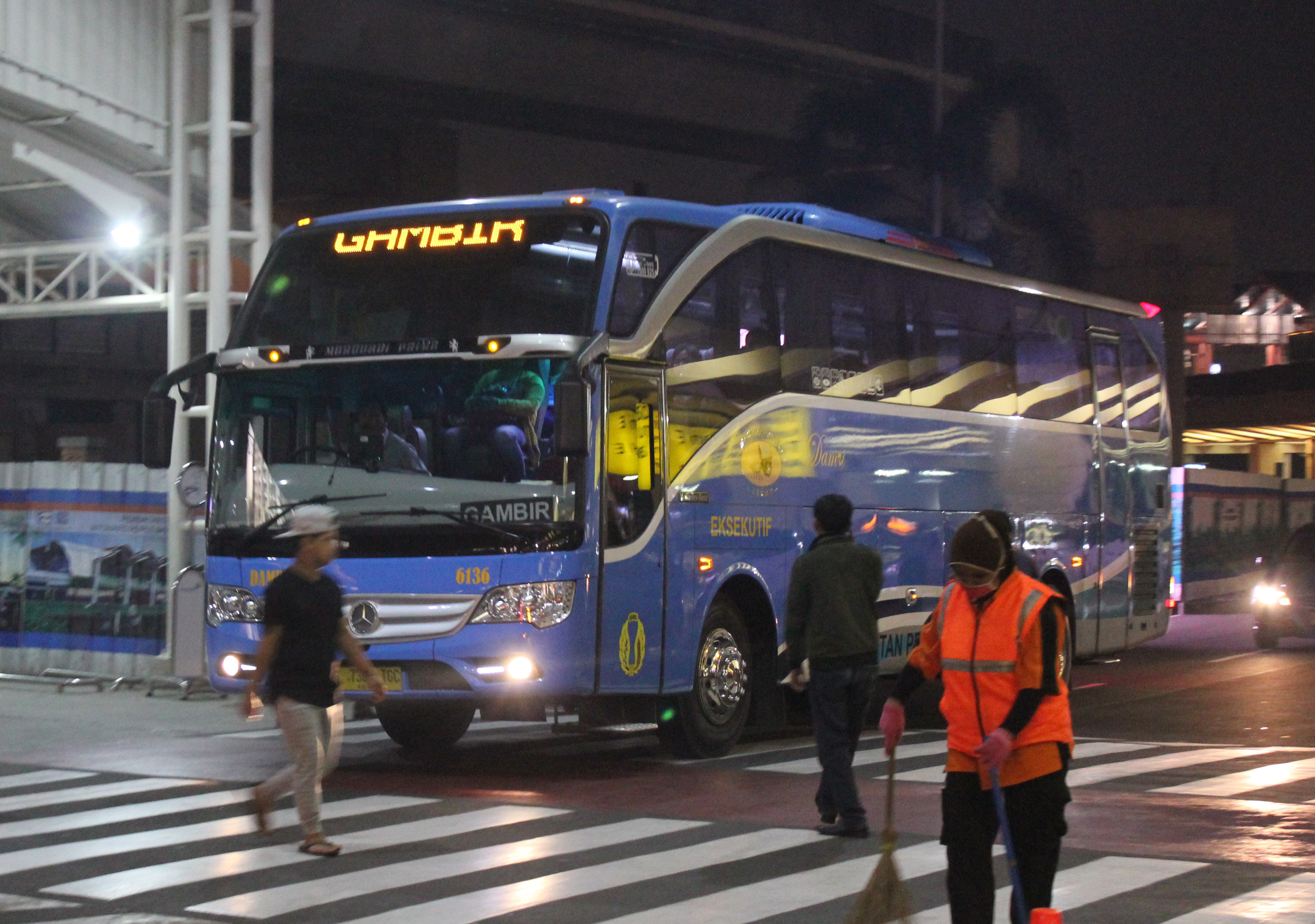
A DAMRI airport shuttle bus in Soekarno-Hatta International Airport

DAMRI Public Corporation (Indonesian: Perusahaan Umum DAMRI; was Djawatan Angkoetan Motor Repoeblik Indonesia, lit. 'Motor Transport Enterprise of the Republic of Indonesia') is an Indonesian state-owned bus operator. Under further development as a public company, the name DAMRI continues to be used as the brand mark of this state-owned enterprise, which still conducts passenger and cargo transport using buses and trucks.

DAMRI has a service network that extends nearly throughout all regions of Indonesia. In its business activities, DAMRI provides city transport, provincial transport, intercity transport, airport transport, tourism transport, logistics transport, transport to isolated areas, and international transport.

== History ==
DAMRI's history officially began in 1943, with the establishment of two enterprises during the Japanese occupation of Java: the Java Transportation Enterprise (Japanese: ジャワ運輸事業社, Hepburn: Jawa Un'yu Jigyōsha; Nihon-shiki: Zyawa Un'yu Zigyôsya) for freight logistics, and the Automobile Board (Japanese: 自動車総局, Hepburn: Jidōsha Sōkyoku; Nihon-shiki: Zidôsha Sôkyoku) for passenger transport. After Indonesia proclaimed independence in 1945, Java Transportation Enterprise changed its name to Djawatan Pengangkoetan (Transport Enterprise) and Automobile Board changed its name to Djawatan Angkoetan Darat (Land Transport Enterprise) as both enterprises were taken over by the Indonesian Department of Transportation.

By 25 November 1946, both enterprises were merged, through a Ministry of Transportation announcement (Indonesian: Maklumat Menteri Perhubungan No.01/DAM/46), into Djawatan Angkoetan Motor Repoeblik Indonesia (DAMRI) - the Motor Transportation Department of Indonesia (MOTDRI). It was tasked to "operate land transportation by buses, trucks and other types of motor vehicles" within the young republic. This day is marked as the company anniversary.

DAMRI has played an active role during the Indonesian National Revolution, especially during the resistance against the twin Dutch military aggression actions, in support of the Indonesian National Armed Forces and the Indonesian National Police.

In 1961, DAMRI was reorganized as a General Director Board (Indonesian: Badan Pimpinan Umum, BPU). In 1965 the DAMRI BPU was corporatized with the status of a State Corporation (Indonesian: Perusahaan Negara, PN), and in 1982 it was reorganized as a public corporation.

On 8 June 2023, Perum PPD was merged into DAMRI. Minister of State-Owned Enterprises Erick Thohir explained the merge was to prevent overlap in service areas.

== Services ==
=== Airport transport ===
Airport transport is one of the service segments that operates to and from airports. These airport transport segments do not only serve in Jakarta, but already reach nearly all airports in Indonesia. This service is called Angkutan Pemadu Moda (APM). Airports currently served by Perum DAMRI include Soekarno-Hatta International Airport, Juanda International Airport and Yogyakarta International Airport.

==== JA Connexion ====
On 26 May 2017, the Jabodetabek Transportation Management Board (BPTJ) planned 12 bus routes from Soekarno-Hatta Airport to some hotels in Jakarta. Perum DAMRI will be operating one routes, which is Amaris Hotel Thamrin City – SHIA.

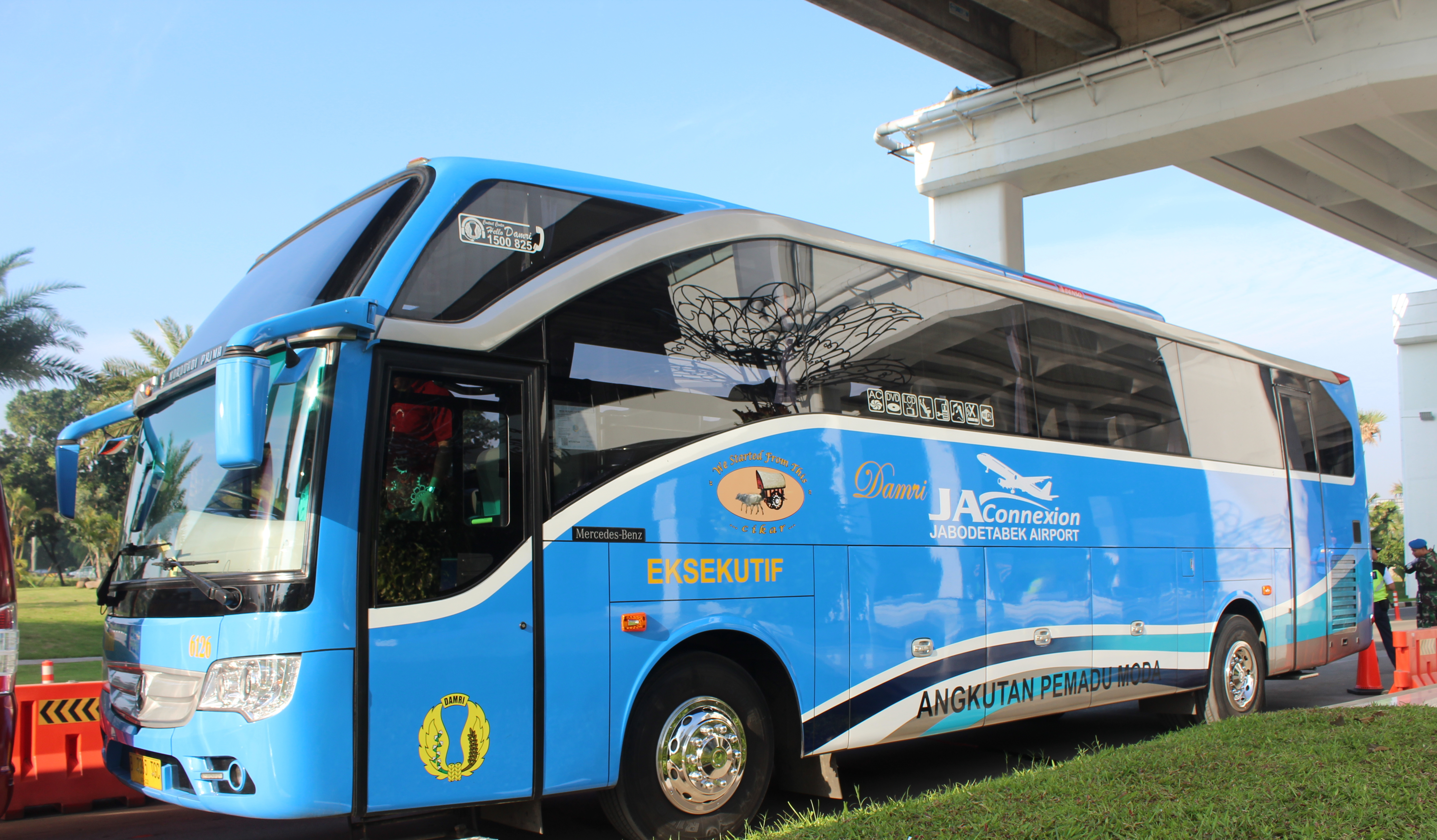
DAMRI Airport bus operated under JA Connexion, Soekarno-Hatta International Airport

DAMRI Shuttle operated under JA Connexion, Soekarno-Hatta International Airport

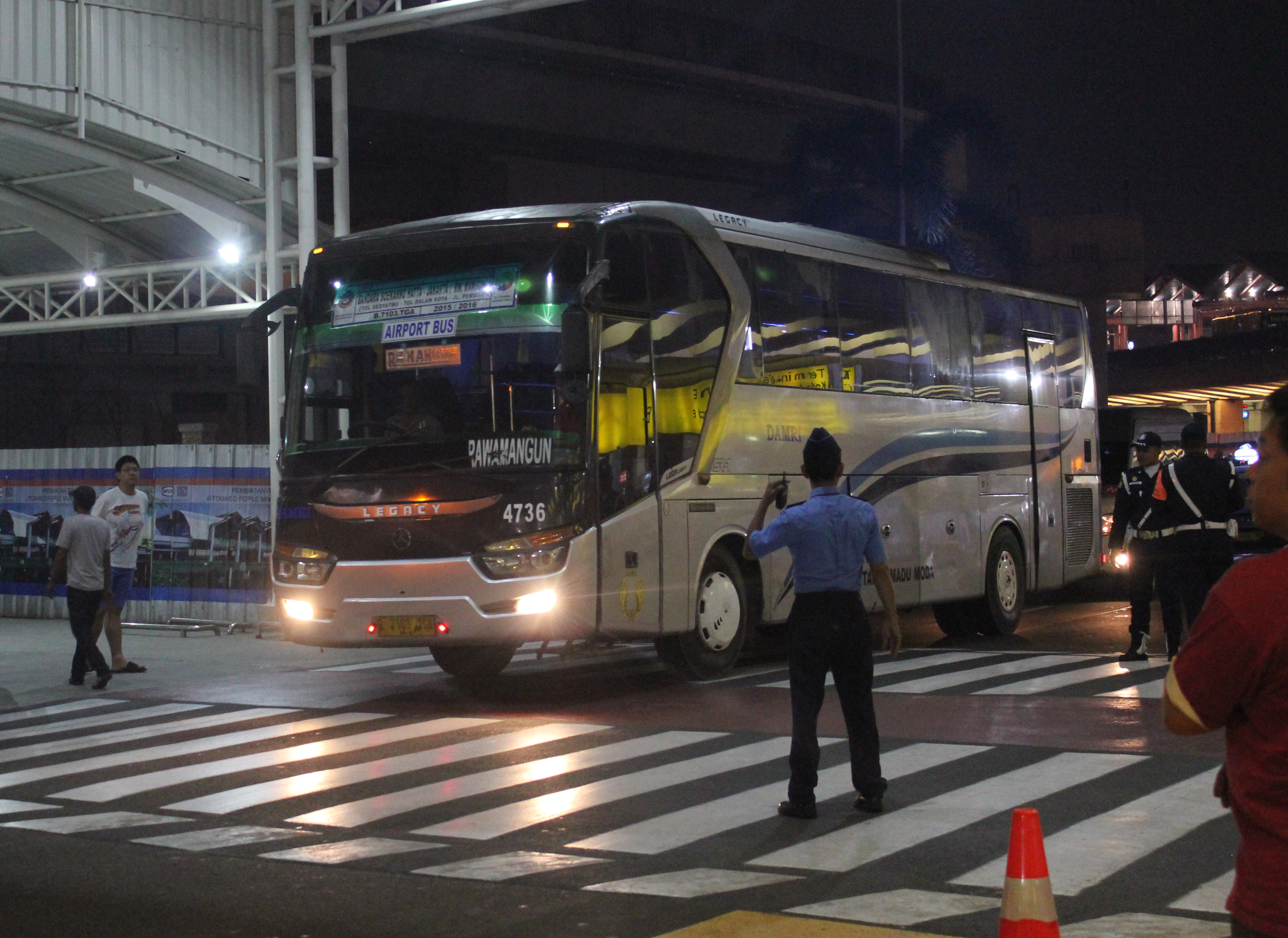
DAMRI Airport bus bound for Rawamangun, Soekarno-Hatta International Airport

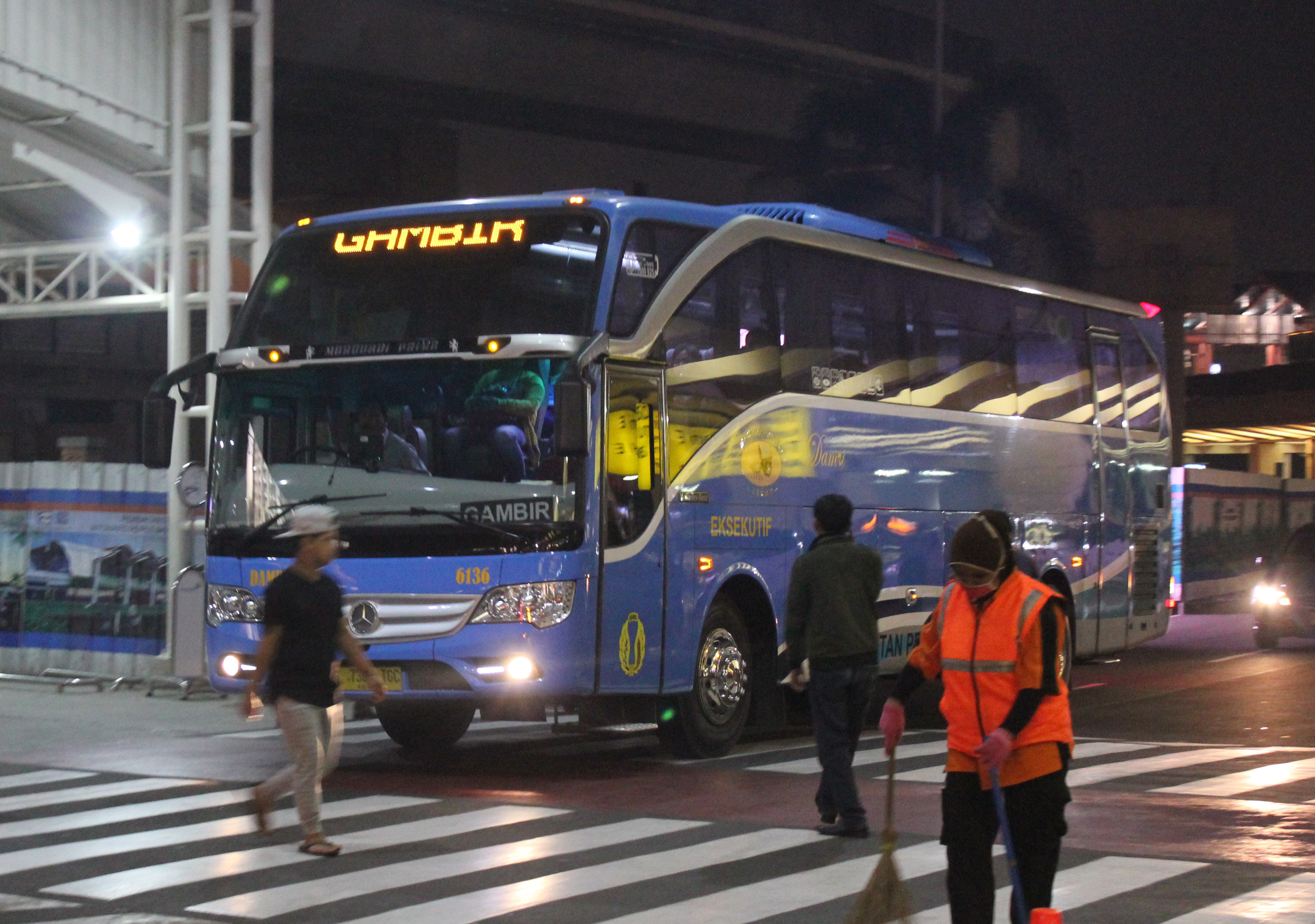
DAMRI Airport bus bound for Gambir Station, Soekarno-Hatta International Airport

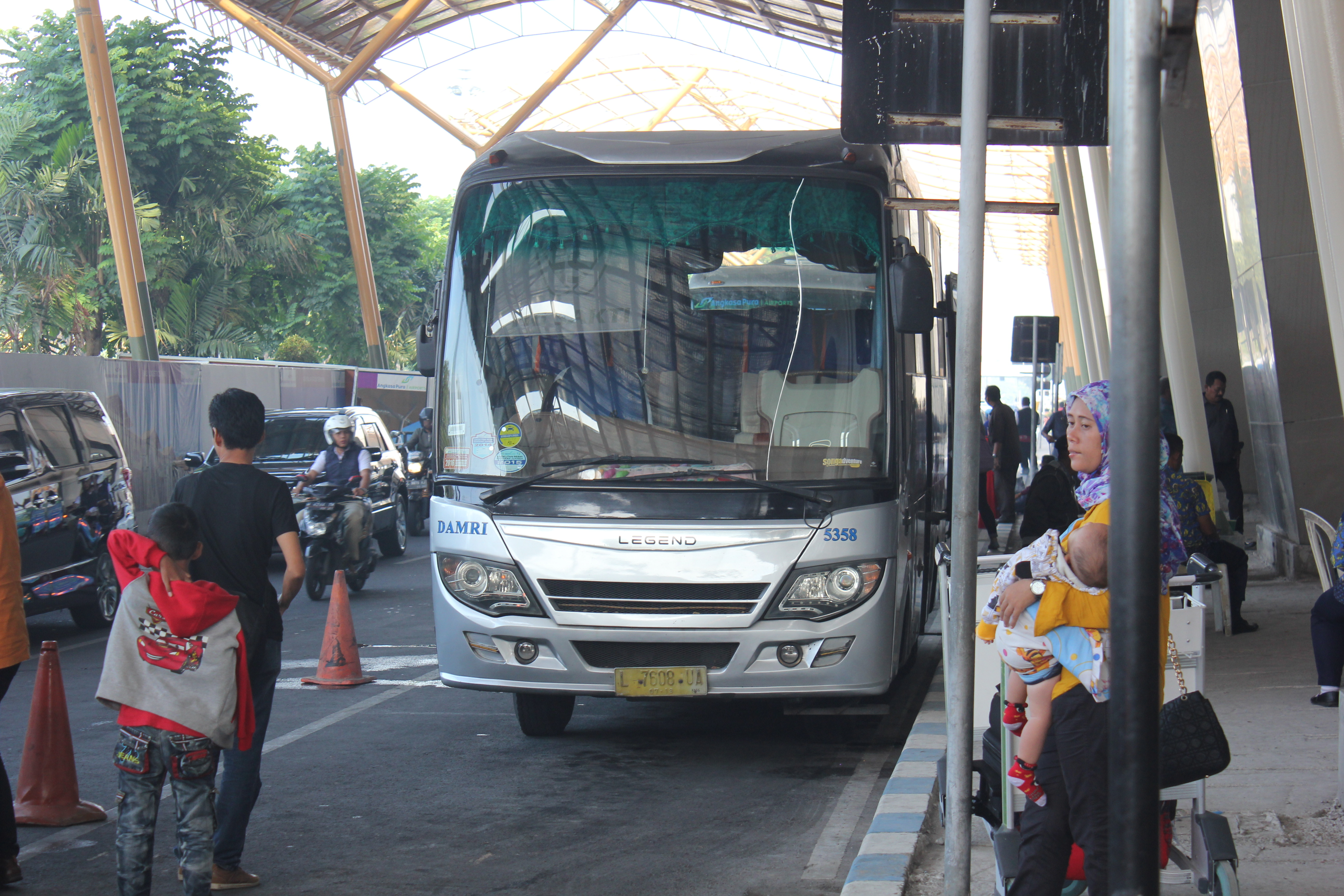
DAMRI Airport bus bound for Purabaya Terminal, Juanda International Airport

=== City bus transport ===
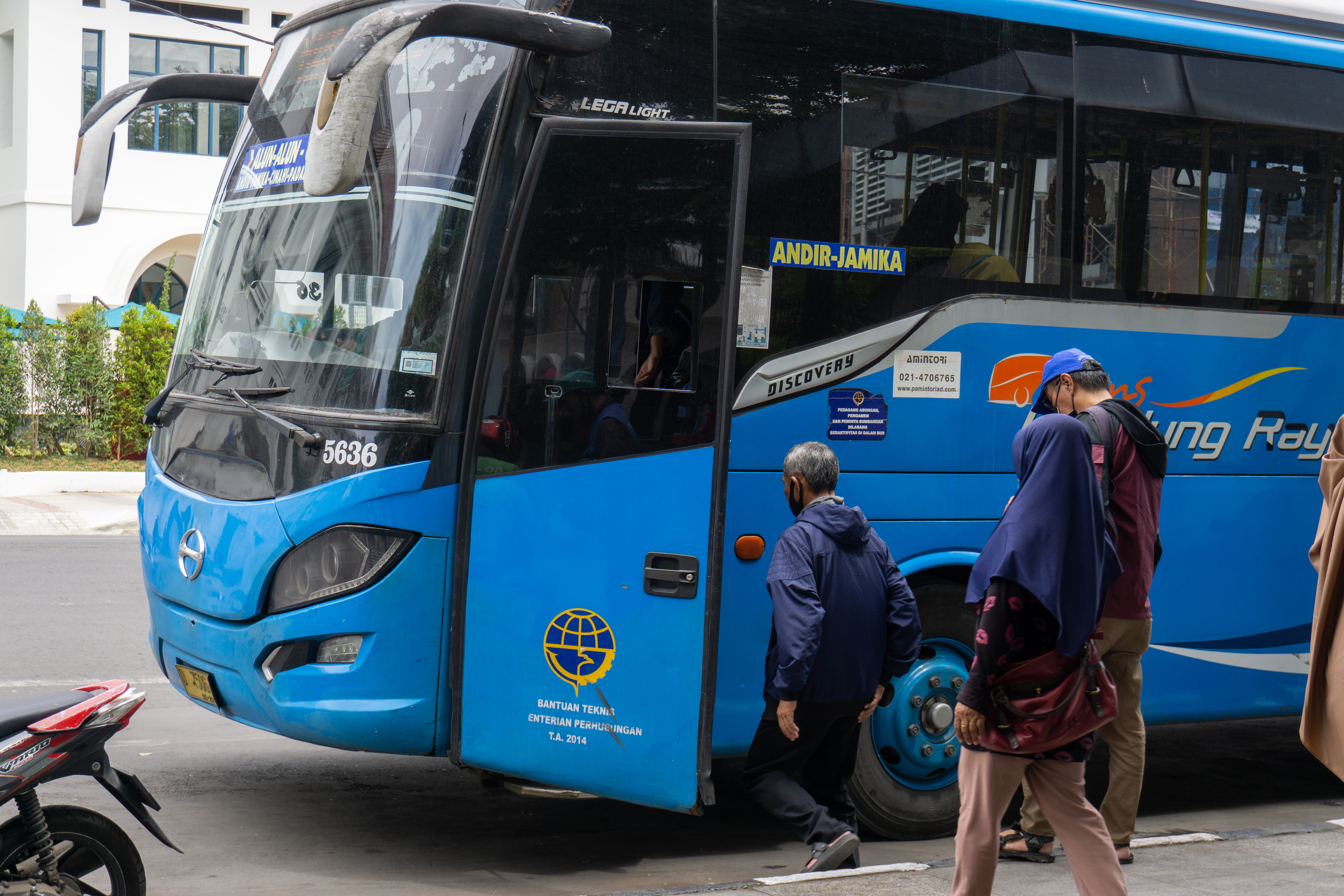
DAMRI 5636 serving Trans Bandung Raya

City bus transport is a mode of transportation inside the city with a specified route. The service ranges into routes in cities, capital cities, provinces or districts. The service extends into in large Indonesian cities such as Medan, Batam, Padang, Palembang, Bandar Lampung, Greater Jakarta, Bandung (Trans Bandung Raya), Yogyakarta, Surakarta, Semarang, Jember, Surabaya, Denpasar (Trans Sarbagita), Makassar, Kendari and Manado.

==== Strategic Business Unit Transjakarta ====
In the past, DAMRI operated 66 Zhongtong LCK6180GC Doosan CNG Euro V articulated buses (in red-orange-yellow livery) for Transjakarta. Perum DAMRI also operated 21 INKA Inobus Cummins ATC 320 CNG Series, which are now retired for its contract period is over. Main corridors that were served were Corridor 5 (Kampung Melayu-Ancol) Corridor 8 (Harmoni-Lebak Bulus), Corridor 9 (Pluit-Pinang Ranti) and Corridor 10 (PGC-Tanjung Priok). As of January 2021, all operations of the Zhongtong units were ceased, and replaced by newer units owned by Perum PPD (in white-blue livery).

Since the merger with DAMRI, all of PPD's fleets were automatically transferred to DAMRI, which includes the newer Zhongtong units and Hino RK8 JSKA-NHU R260, the latter gradually retired since January 2025. On 22 December 2023, DAMRI officially launched 26 units of orange-white-colored Skywell NJL6129BEV low-floor electric bus for non-BRT feeder routes, operating under the Metrotrans brand. On 10 December 2024, DAMRI launched 60 units the BRT variant of the Skywell e-buses (colored in blue-white) and 30 units of Zhongtong LCK6126EVGRA1 BRT-standard electric buses to replace the retiring Hino units.

Fleet Operated by DAMRI for Transjakarta
Type	Hull No.	Bus Color	Fuel	Karoseri	Operation		Image	Description
Type	Hull No.	Bus Color	Fuel	Karoseri	Start	End	Image	Description
Retired Fleet
Inobus ATC 320 GNG Series Euro V	DMR 001 - DMR 021	Red-Orange	CNG	Laksana Cityline	2011	December 2018		Asset of the provincial government
Inobus ATC 320 GNG Series Euro V	DMR 001 - DMR 021	Red-Orange	CNG	Trisakti	2011	December 2018		Asset of the provincial government
Zhongtong LCK6180GC Doosan Euro V	DAMRI 5049 - DAMRI 5114	Red-Orange	CNG	CBU	2012	January 2021		
Hino RK8JSKA-NHJ R260	DMR 104 - DMR 153	Blue	Diesel	Restu Ibu Integra	April 2016	January 2026		transferred from Perum PPD
Hino RK8JSKA-NHJ R260	DMR 154 - DMR 353	Blue	Diesel	Rahayu Santosa Cityliner	April 2016	January 2026		transferred from Perum PPD
Hino RK8JSKA-NHJ R260	DMR 354 - DMR 503; DMR 604 - DMR 703	Blue	Diesel	Laksana Discovery	April 2016	January 2026		transferred from Perum PPD
Operational Fleet
Zhongtong LCK6180GC Doosan Euro V	DMR 705 - DMR 763	Red-Orange	CNG	CBU	October 2019			transferred from Perum PPD
Skywell NJL6129BEV low-entry	DMR 230099 - DMR 230124	Orange (Metrotrans)	Electric	CBU				
Skywell NJL6126BEV BRT	DMR 240155 - DMR 240214	Blue	Electric	CBU				Batch 1
Skywell NJL6126BEV BRT	DMR 250225 - DMR 250274	Blue	Electric	CBU				Batch 2
Zhongtong LCK6126EVGRA1	DMR 240125 - DMR 240154	Blue	Electric	CBU				Batch 1
Zhongtong LCK6126EVGRA1	DMR 250155 - DMR 250224	Blue	Electric	CBU				Batch 2
VKTR BYD HF-12 Tidar	DMR 250275 - DMR 250354	Blue	Electric	Laksana Cityline 3				

Current fleets

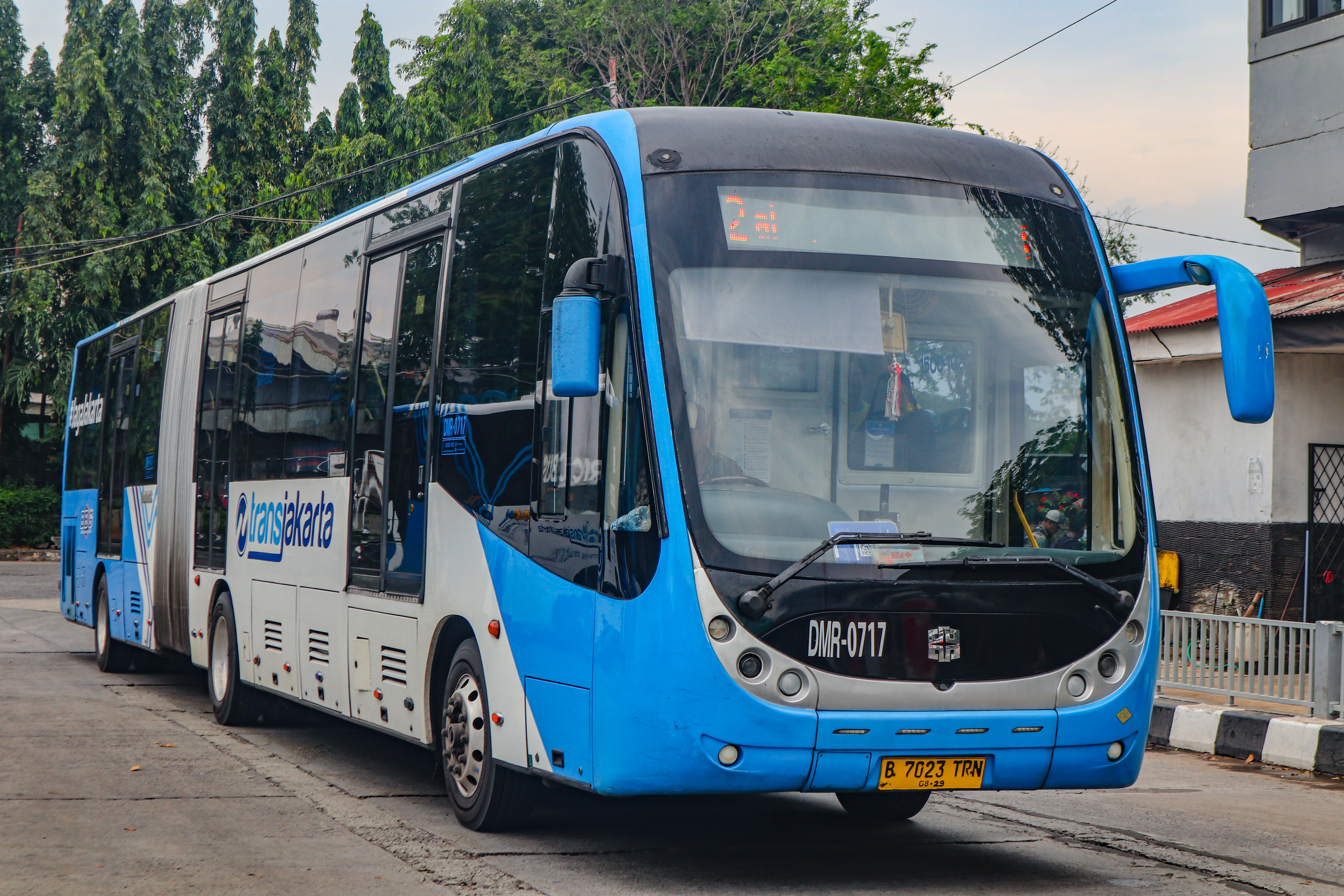
The newer Zhongtong LCK6180GC Doosan CNG Euro V (transferred from Perum PPD), serving corridor 2

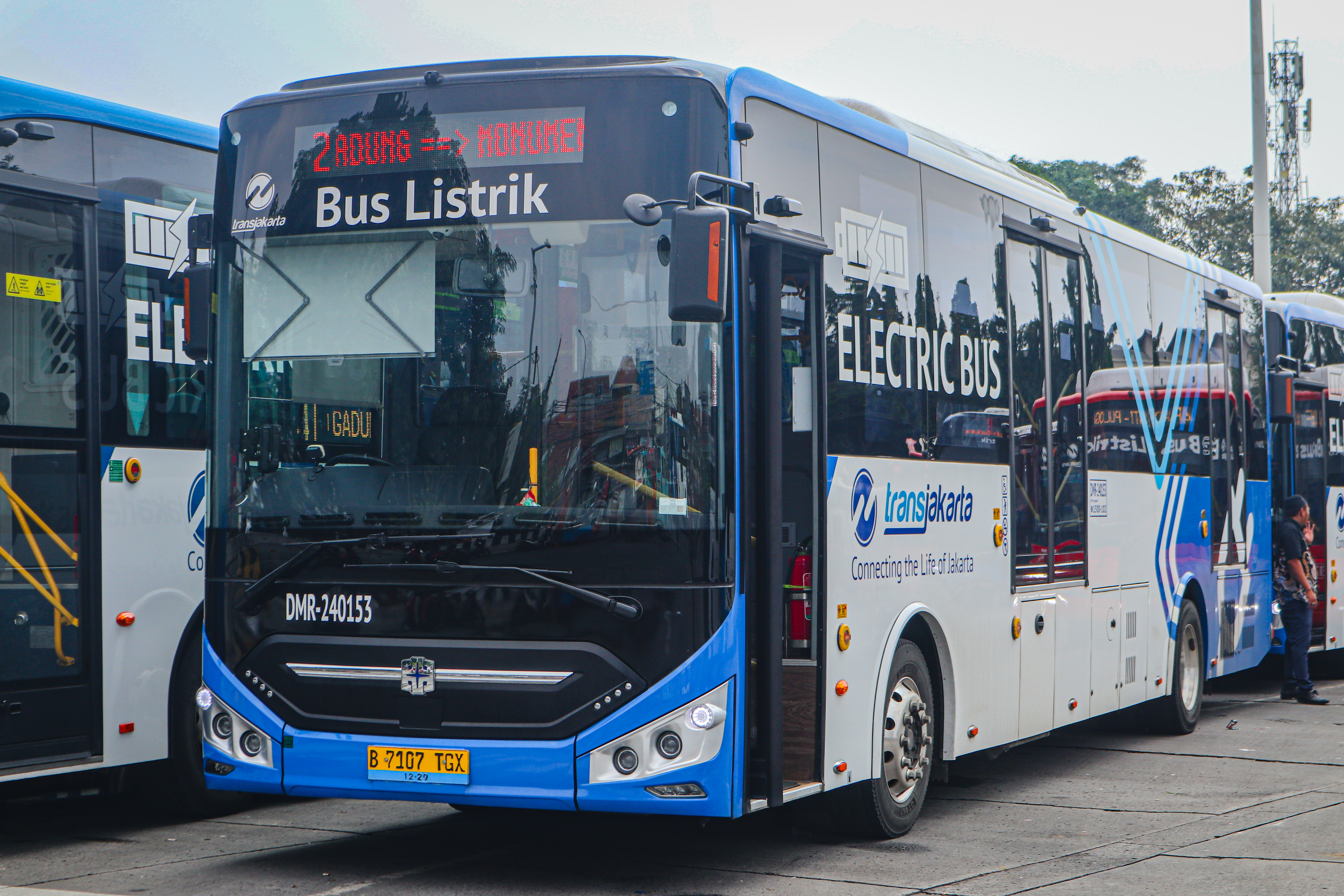
Zhongtong LCK6126EVGRA1 electric bus, serving corridor 2

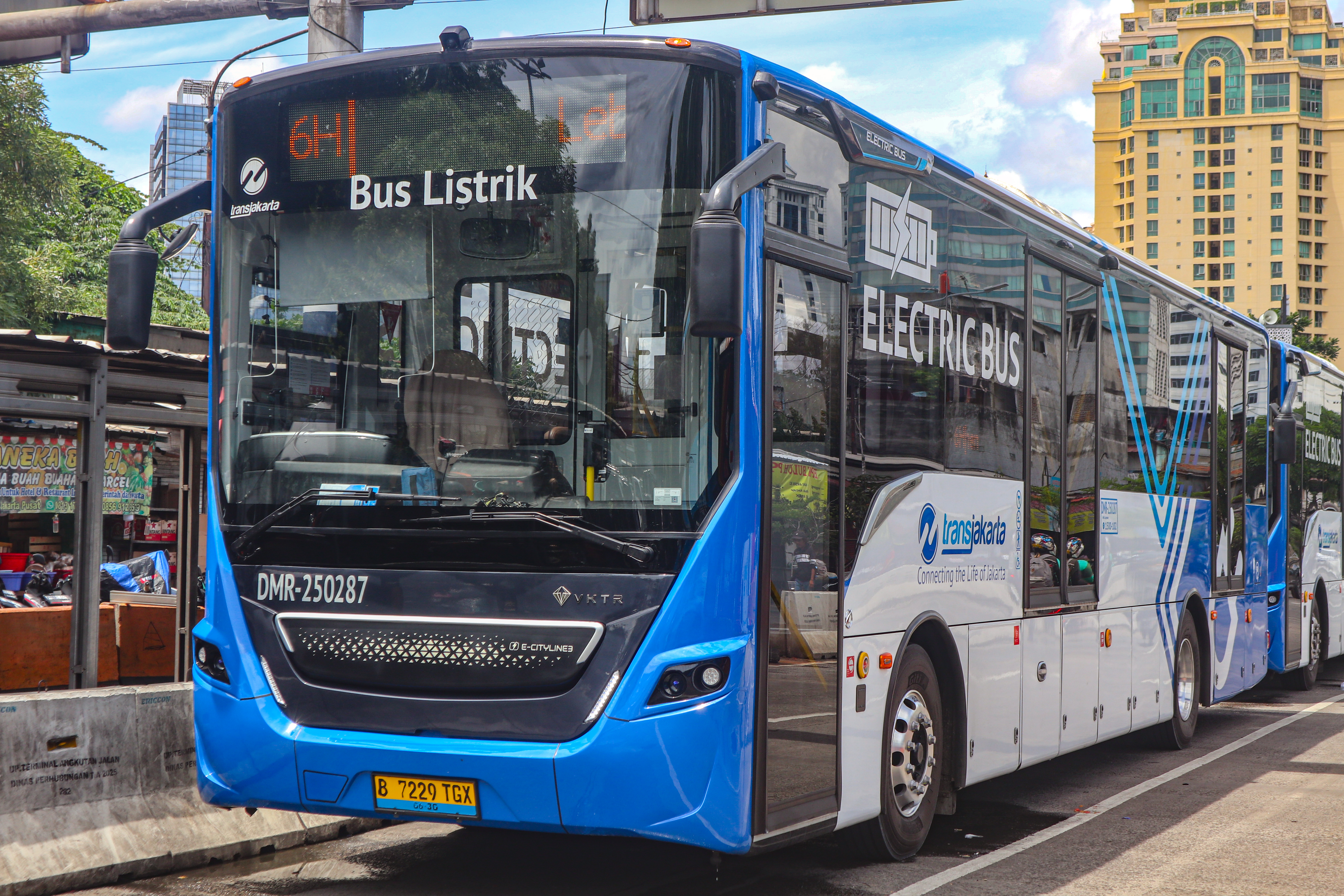
BYD HF-12 Tidar electric bus, serving feeder route 6H

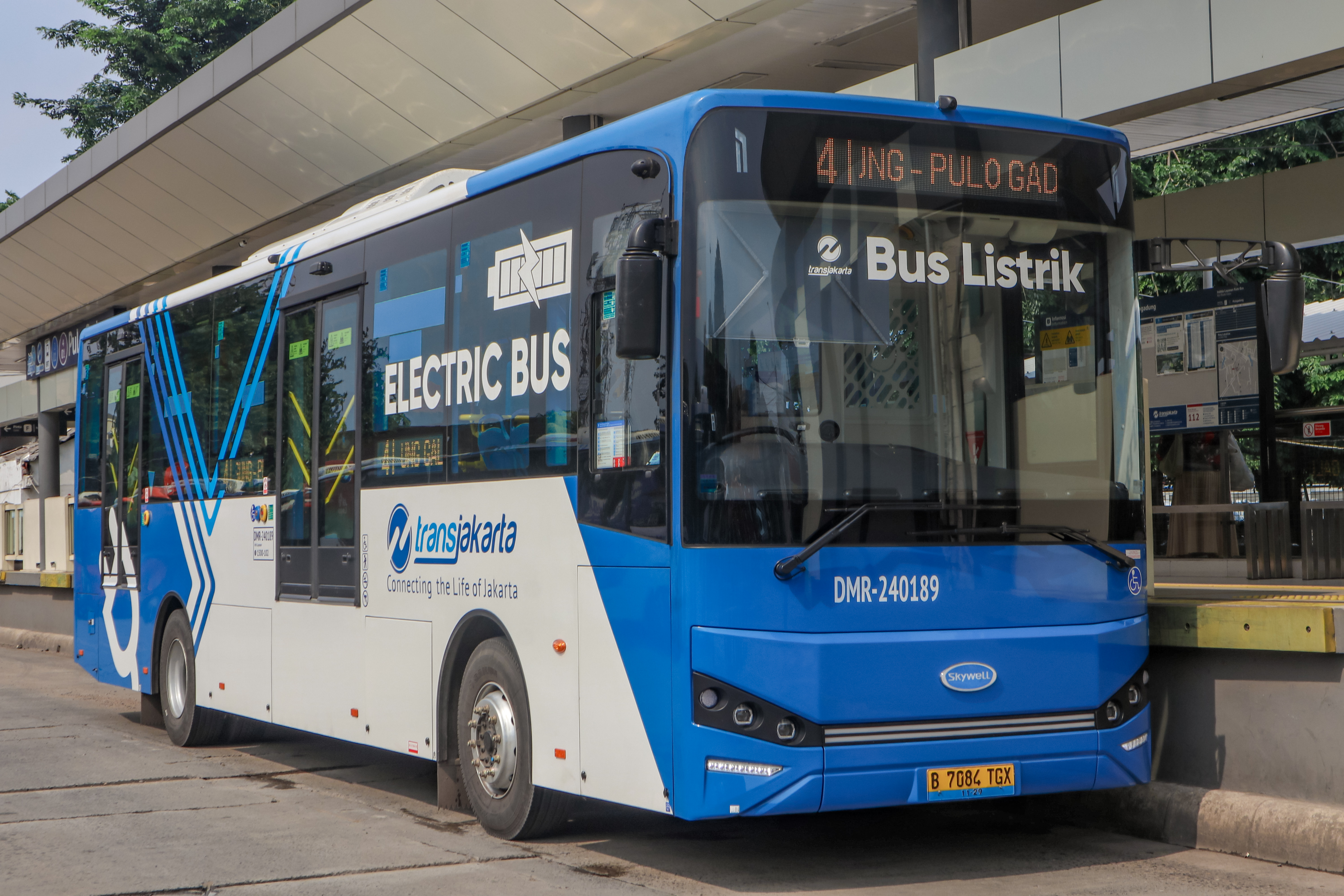
Skywell NJL6126BEV electric bus, serving corridor 4

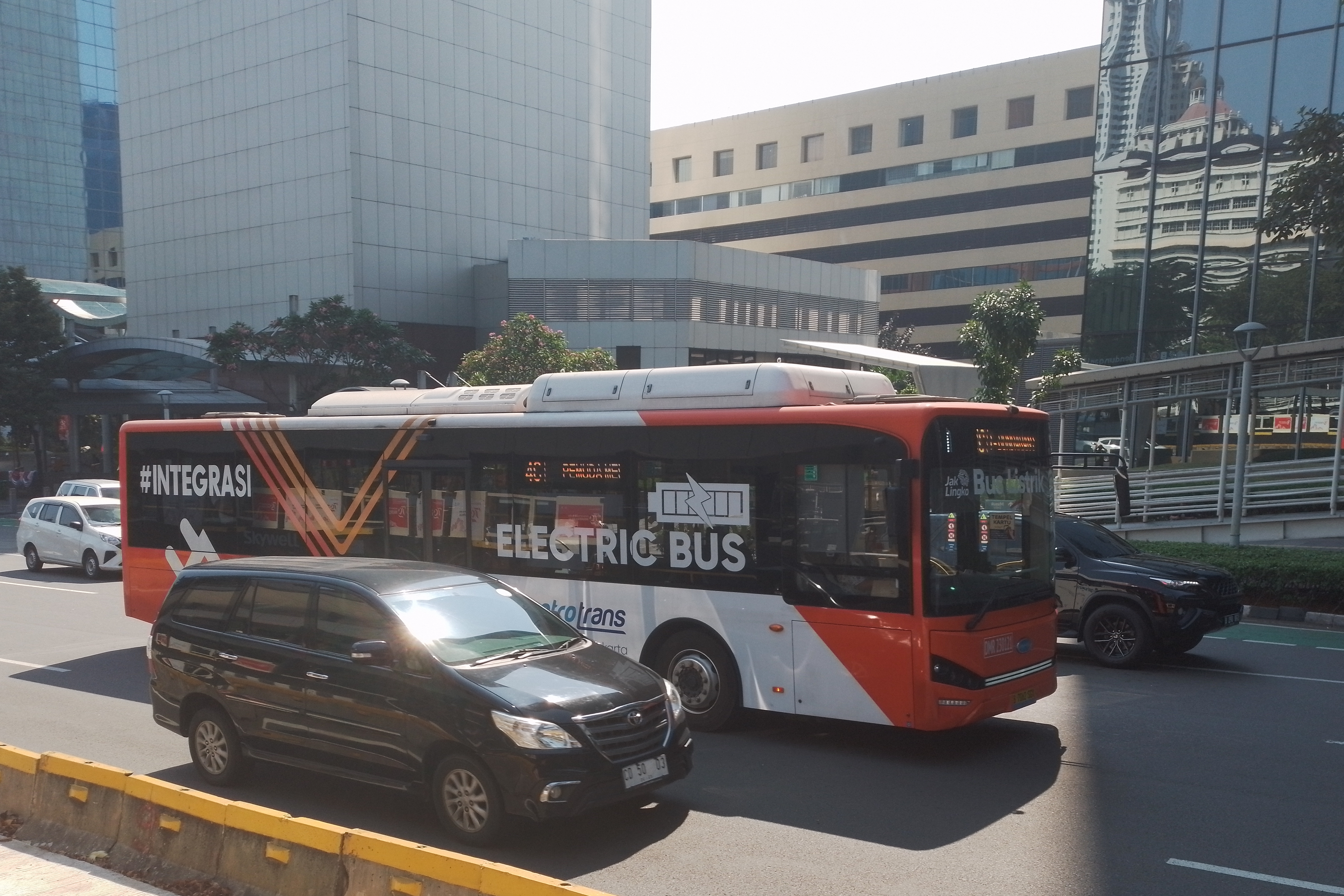
Skywell NJL6129BEV low-deck electric bus, serving feeder route 4C
Retired fleets

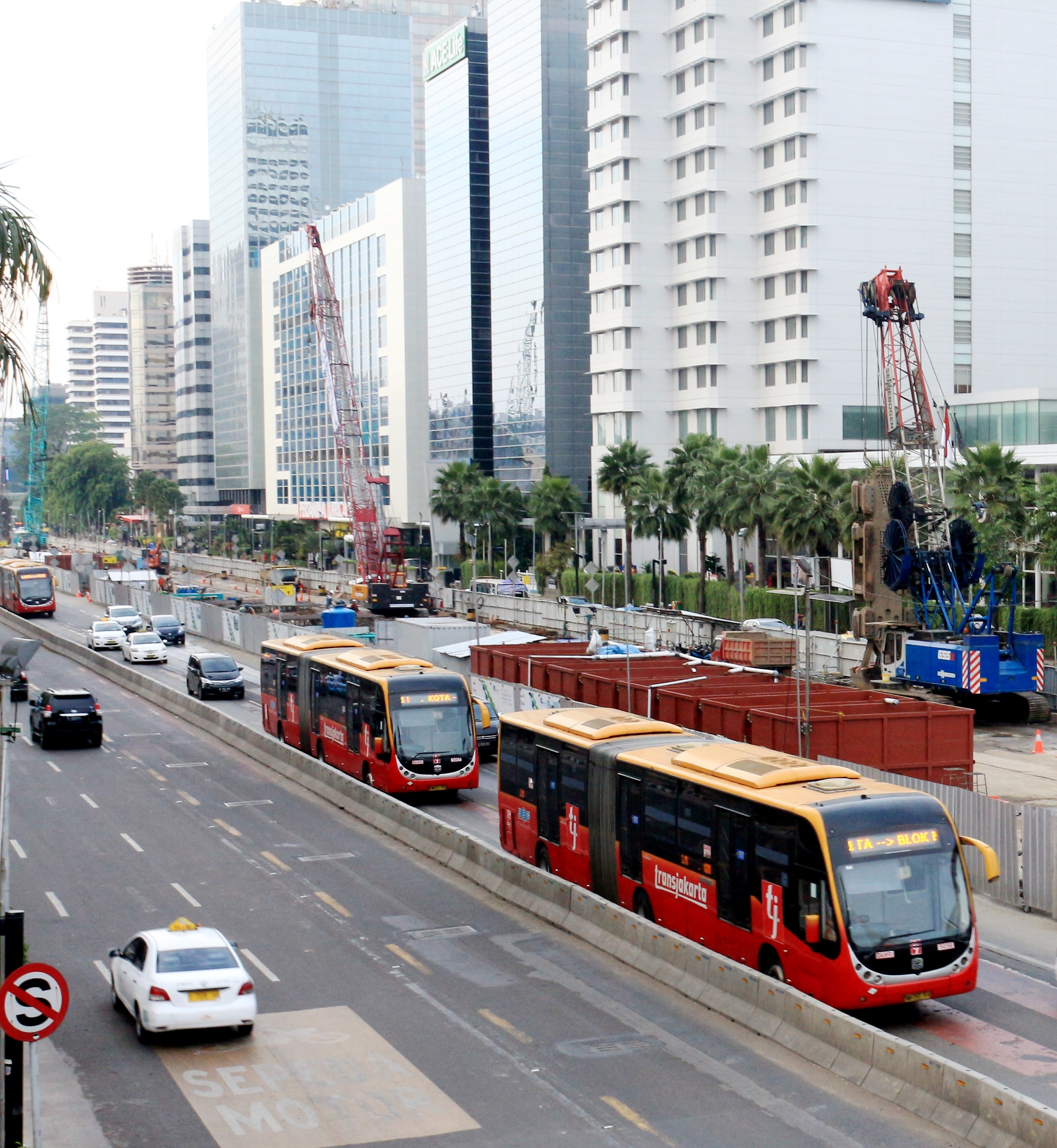
DAMRI's older Zhongtong buses, nonoperational

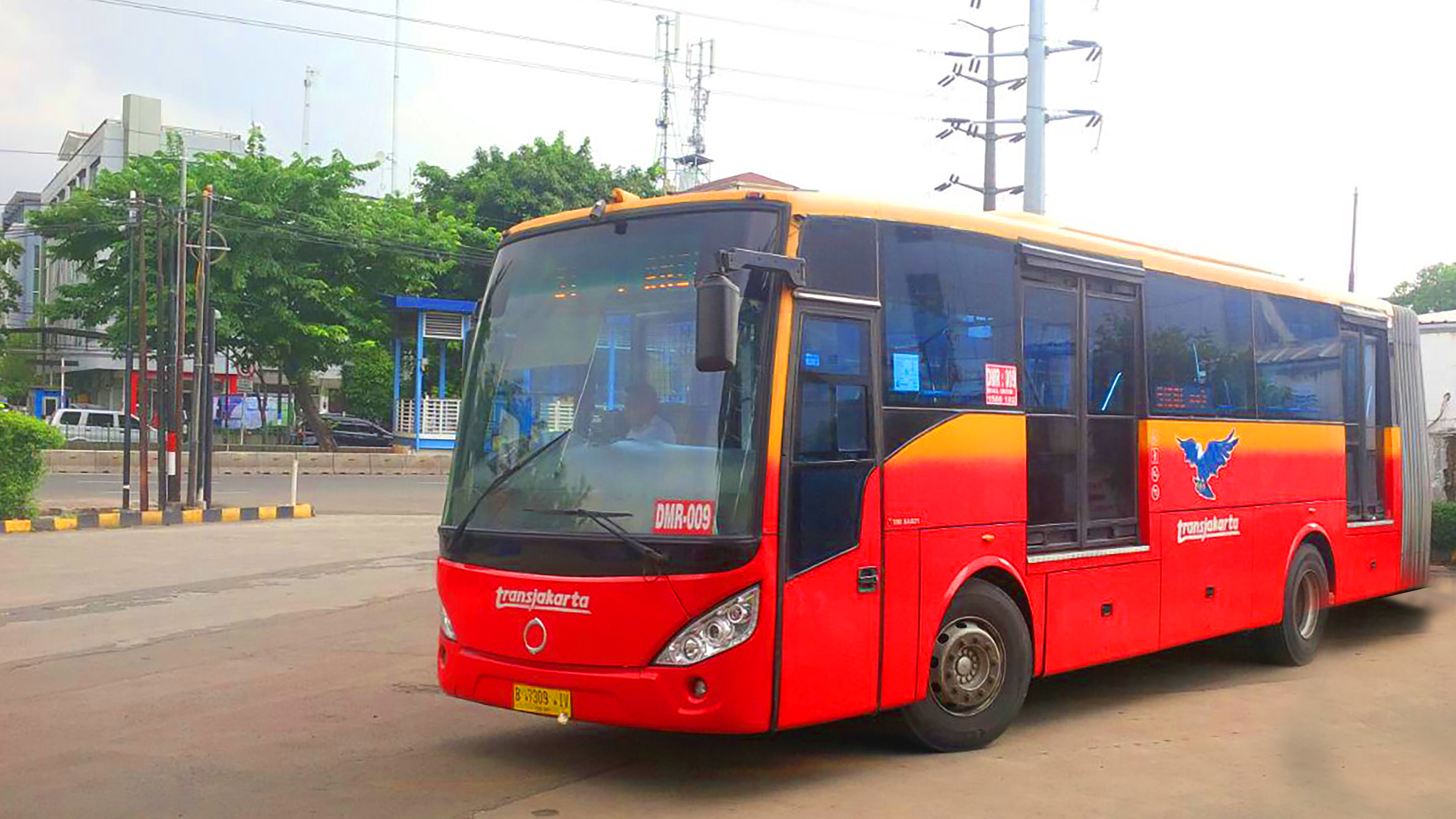
DAMRI Inobus bus, nonoperational

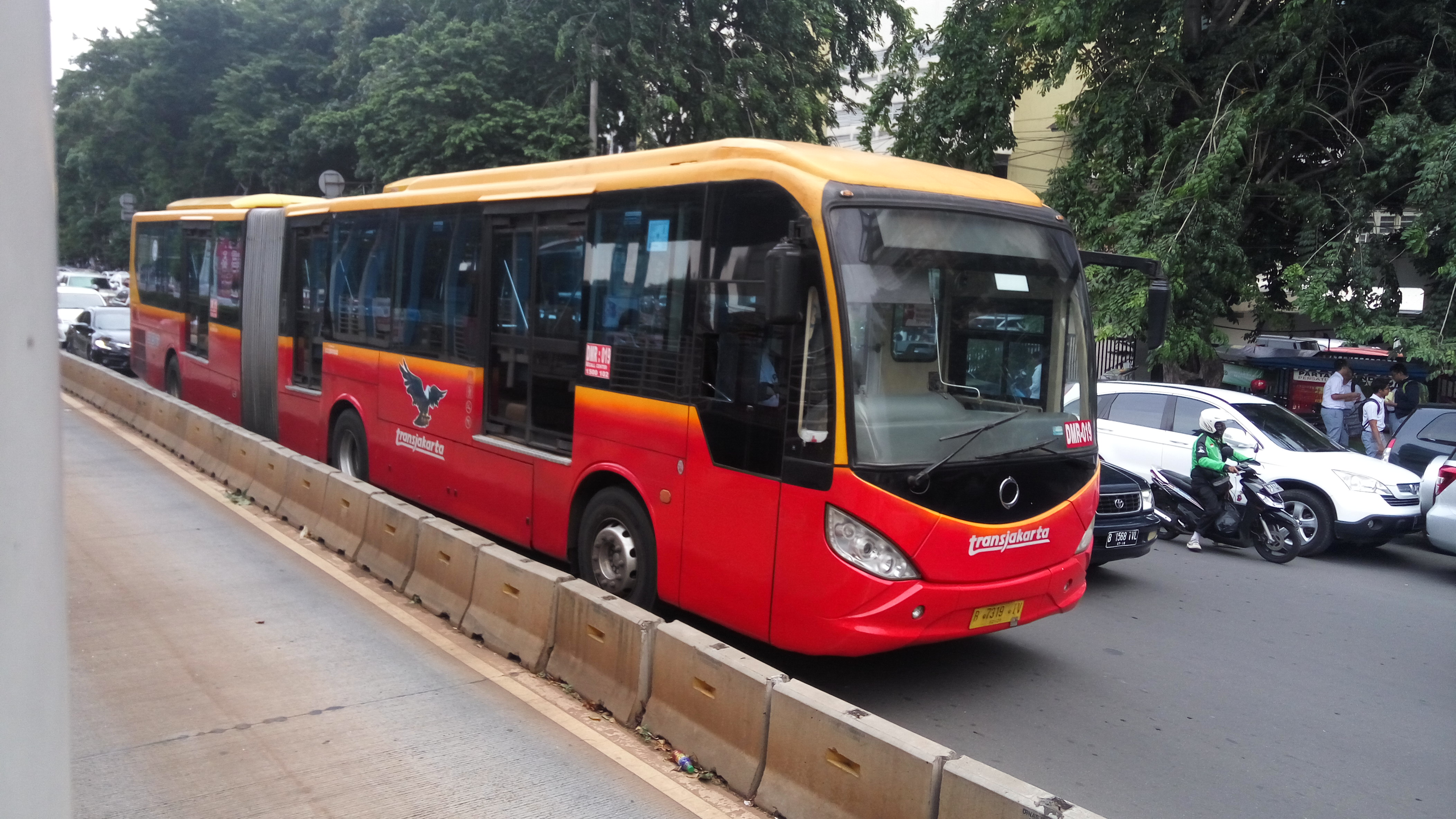
DAMRI Inobus bus, nonoperational

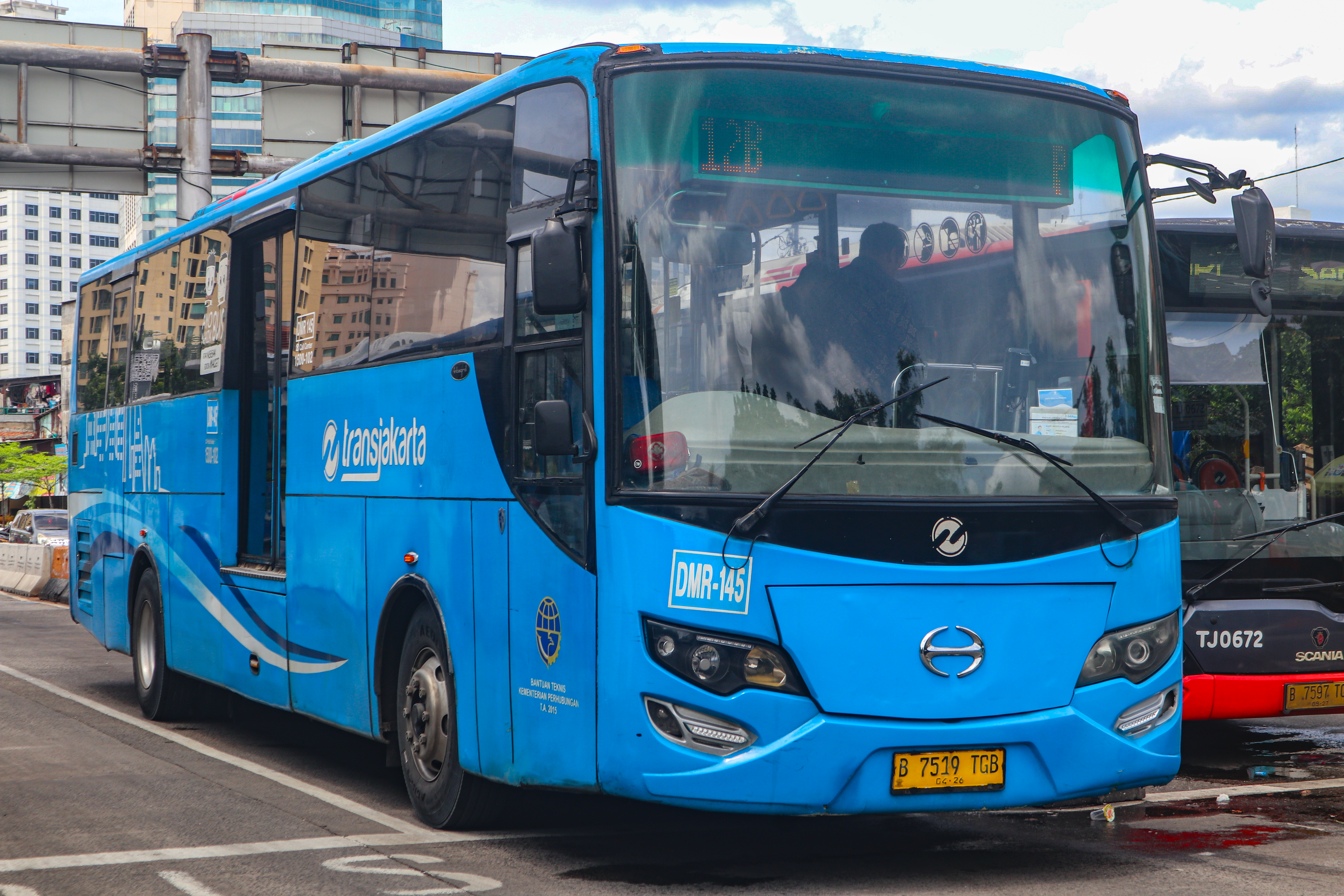
Hino RK8 JSKA-NHU R260, with Integra body made by Restu Ibu Pusaka coachmaker (transferred from Perum PPD), nonoperational

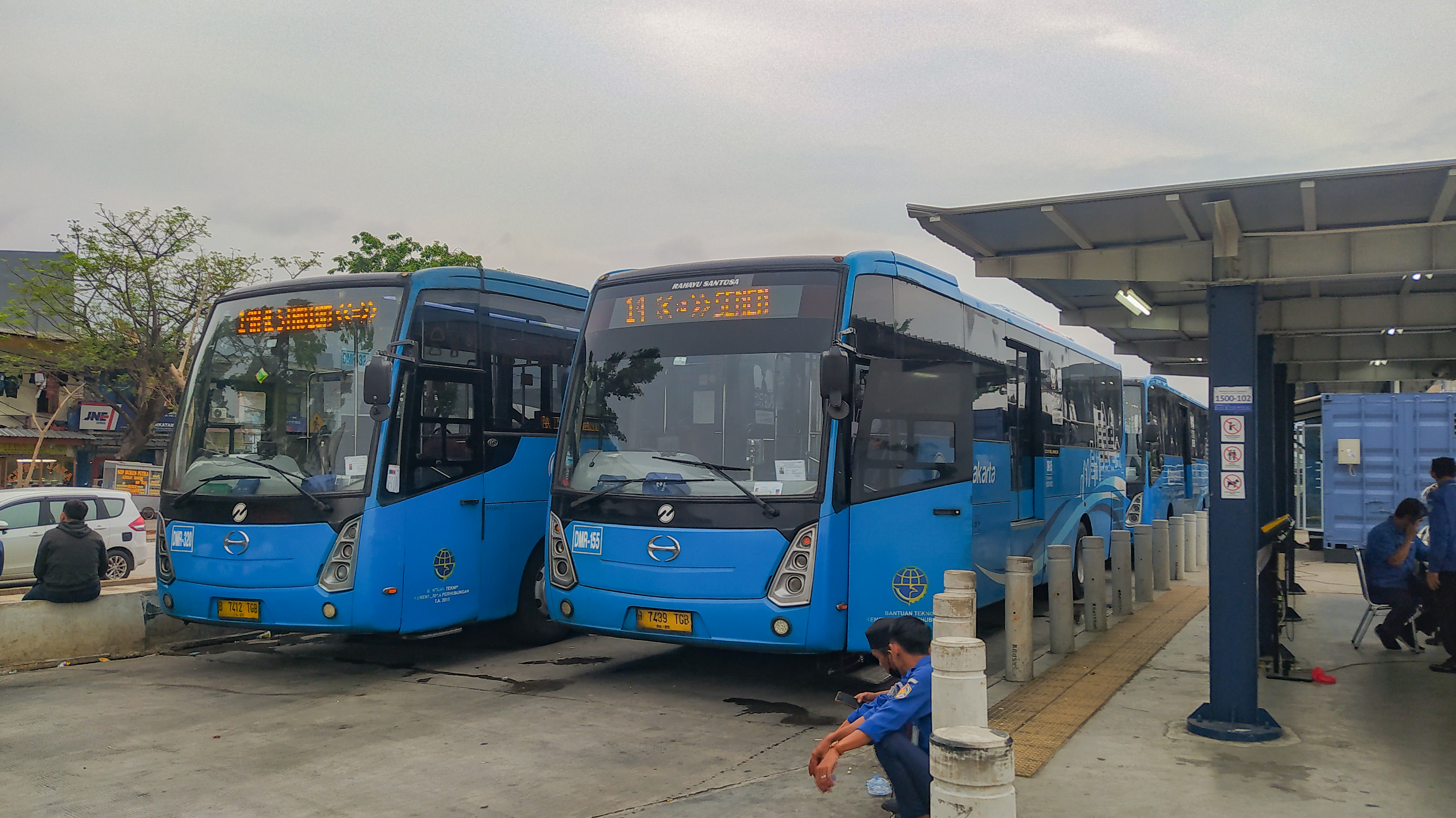
Hino RK8 JSKA-NHU R260, with Cityliner body made by Rahayu Sentosa coachmaker (transferred from Perum PPD), nonoperational

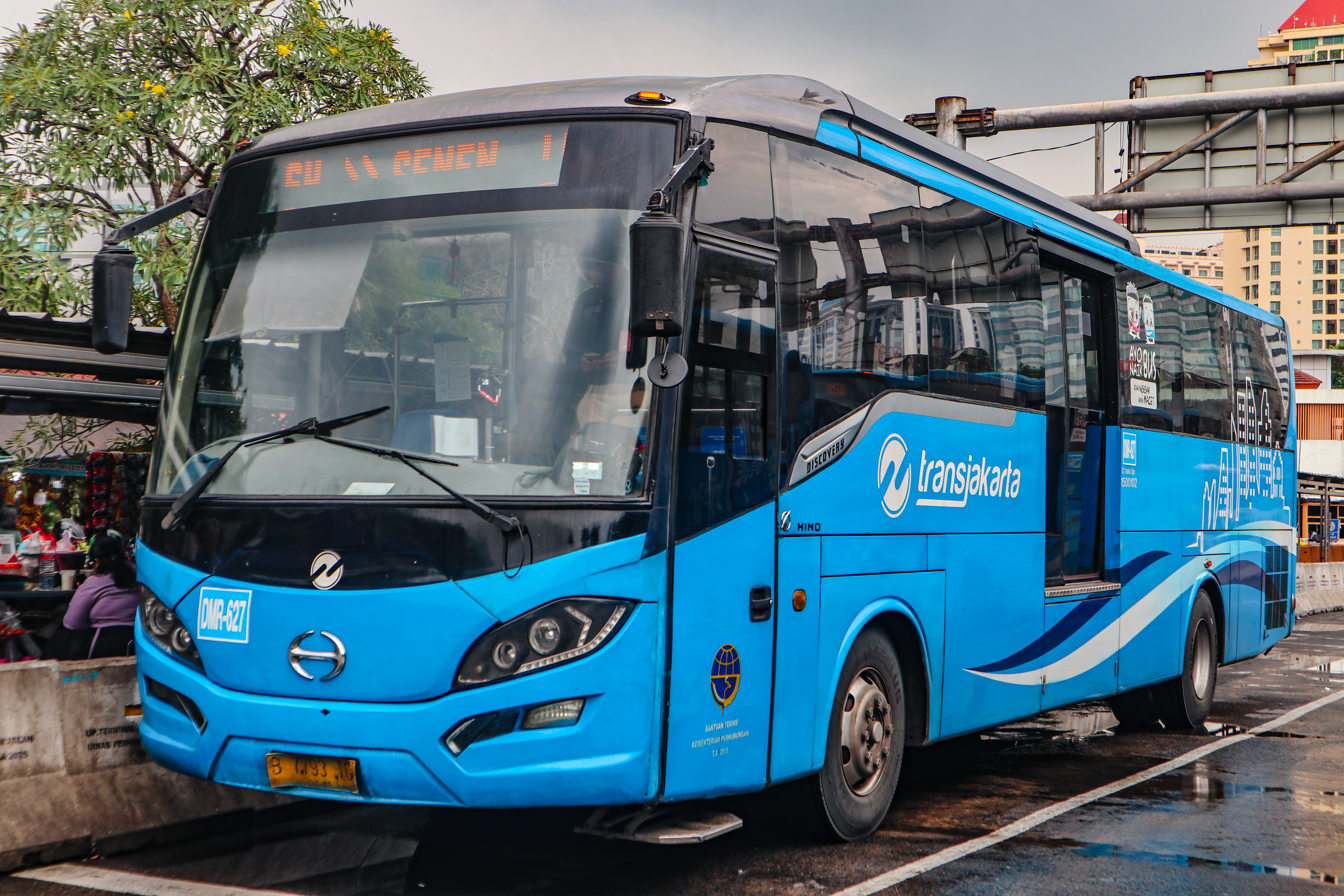
Hino RK8 JSKA-NHU R260, with Discovery body made by Laksana coachmaker (transferred from Perum PPD), nonoperational

==== Strategic Business Unit TransJabodetabek ====
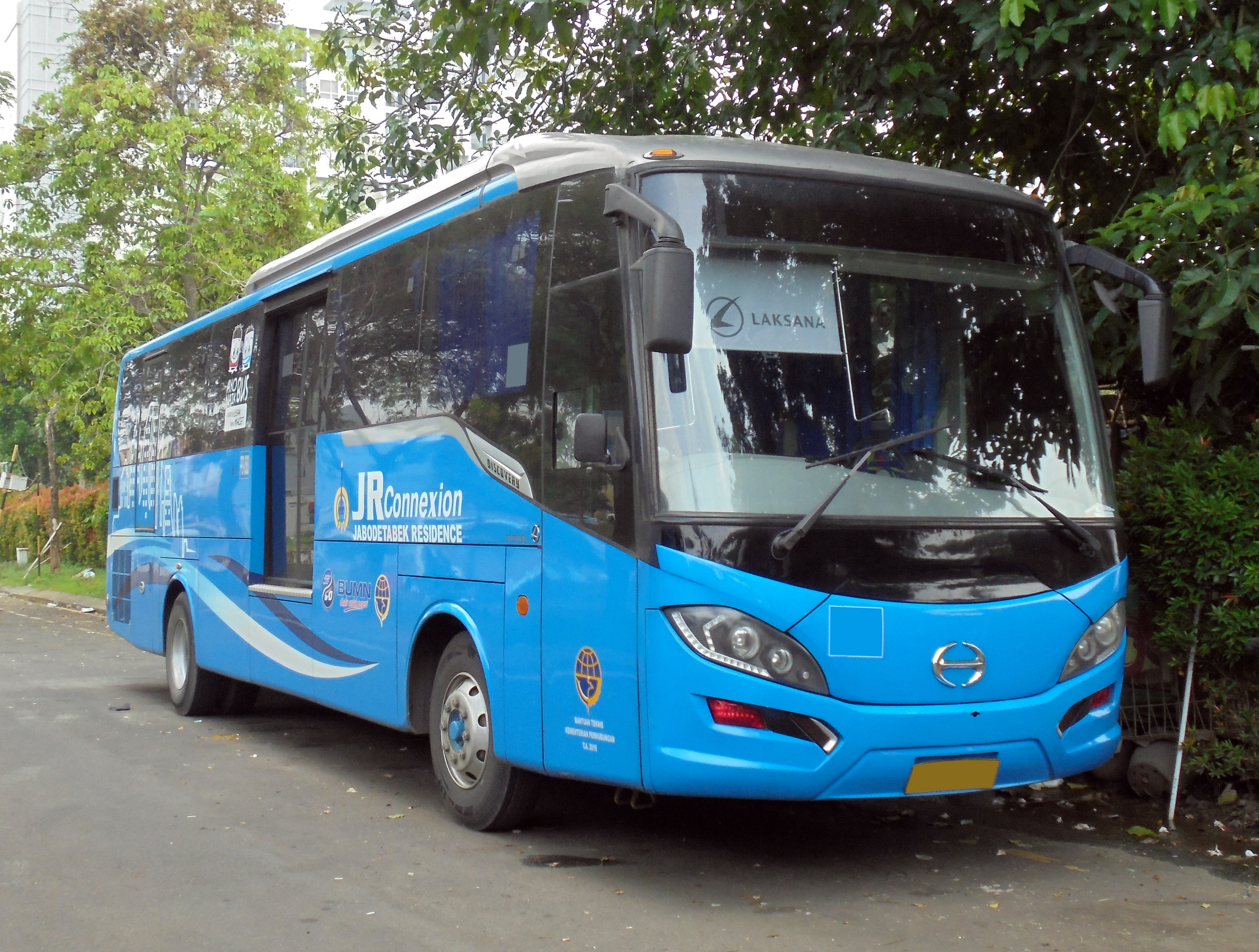
Hino RK8 JSKA-NHU R260 fleet, with Discovery body made by Laksana coachmaker, serving JR Connexion (transferred from PPD)

This business unit, which is transferred from Perum PPD, connects several gated communities in Greater Jakarta (Jabodetabek) with the Jakarta city center. Some routes are branded as TransJabodetabek or Jabodetabek Residence Connexion (JR Connexion). The current fleet is Hino RK8 JSKA-NHU R260, where some of them were previously used or originally planned as a Transjakarta fleet operated by PPD. In September 2023, three months after the handover from PPD, the JR Connexion-branded routes of this business unit have carried about 400,000 passengers.

==== Trans Bandung Raya ====
Trans Bandung Raya (TBR) is DAMRI's transit bus system in the Bandung metropolitan area, West Java. It originally had 20 routes, but due to the presence of other bus systems in the city—namely Trans Metro Bandung and Trans Metro Pasundan (in which DAMRI become its operator), only 5 TBR routes that still operational. The current routes are:

Code	Route
D2	Leuwipanjang–Ledeng
	Elang–Jatinangor (via Moh. Toha Toll Link)
	Tanjung Sari–Kebon Kalapa
	Cibiru–Leuwi Panjang (via Cicaheum)
	Alun-Alun Bandung–Kota Baru Parahyangan (via Pasteur Toll Link)

=== Inter-city transport ===
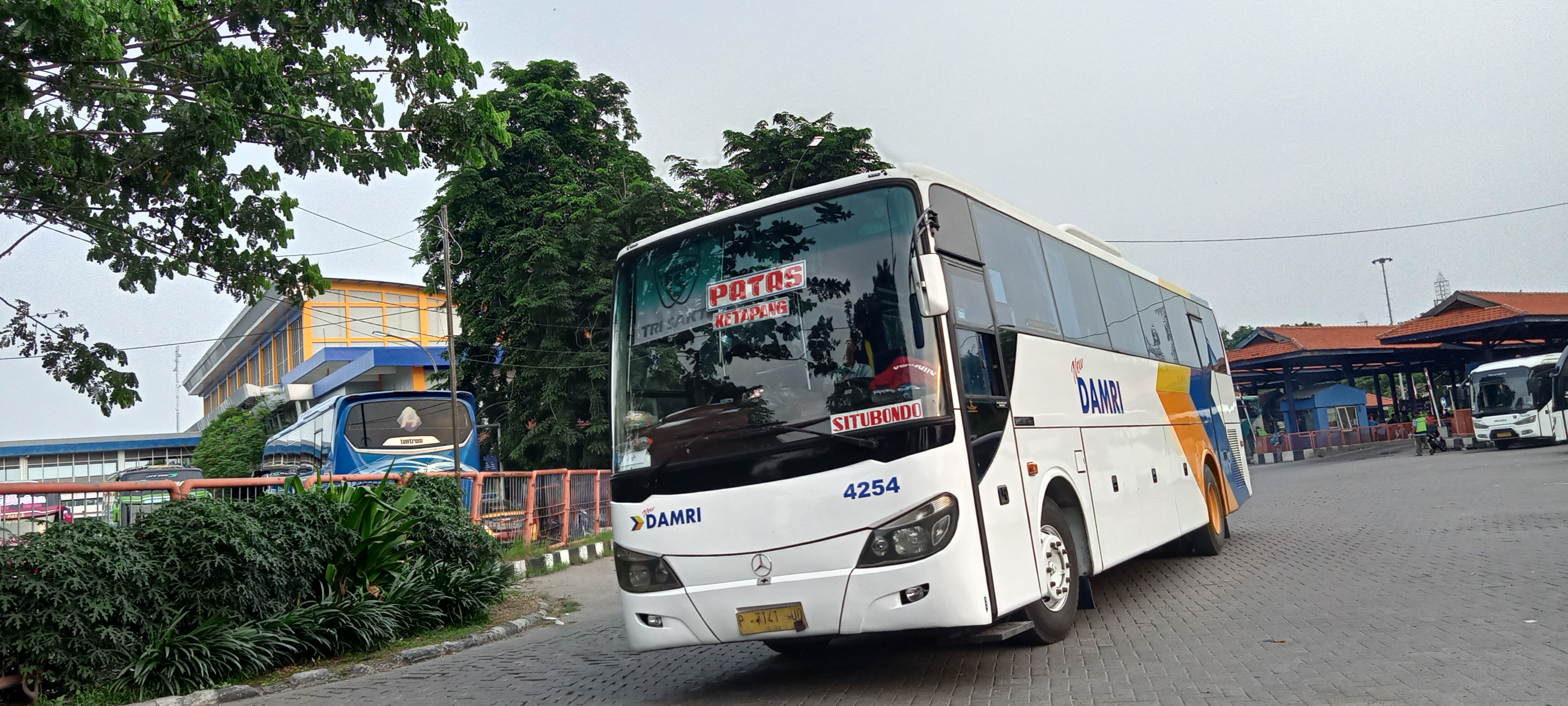
A DAMRI intercity bus showing its new colors.

DAMRI serves an inter-city transport in Indonesia known as AKDP (Inter-City Inner Province) and AKAP (Inter-city Inter-Province). This service serves from one city to another and goes through province borders, and it have four non-economy classes; Business, Executive, Royal, Limousine and the latest, Imperial Suite (using double-decker bus). Some are:

- Bandung - Kuningan (AKDP)
- Bandung - Indramayu (AKDP)
- Jakarta - Yogyakarta (AKAP)
- Jakarta - Lampung (AKAP)
- Yogyakarta - Temanggung (AKAP)
- Yogyakarta - Semarang (AKAP)
- Jakarta - Surabaya (AKAP)
- Jakarta - Purwokerto (AKAP)
- Malang - Palembang (AKAP)
- Pontianak - Pangkalan Bun (AKAP)
- Banjarmasin - Samarinda (AKAP)
- Balikpapan - Nusantara (AKDP)

=== International cross-border transport ===
Inter-country transport is a mode of transportation from one city to another, across country borders. DAMRI operates inter-country transport across the Indonesia-Malaysia border, serving a route between Pontianak, Indonesia to Kuching, Malaysia, as well as from Pontianak to Bandar Seri Bengawan in Brunei Darussalam.

DAMRI is also in the process of opening inter-country transport to Papua Nugini and Timor Leste. The international bus routes that are served by DAMRI are as follows:

- Pontianak (Indonesia) – Kuching (Malaysia)
- Pontianak (Indonesia) – Bandar Seri Begawan (Brunei Darussalam)
- Kupang (Indonesia) - Dili (Timor Leste)
- Jayapura (Indonesia) – Vanimo (Papua New Guinea)

=== Pioneer transport ===
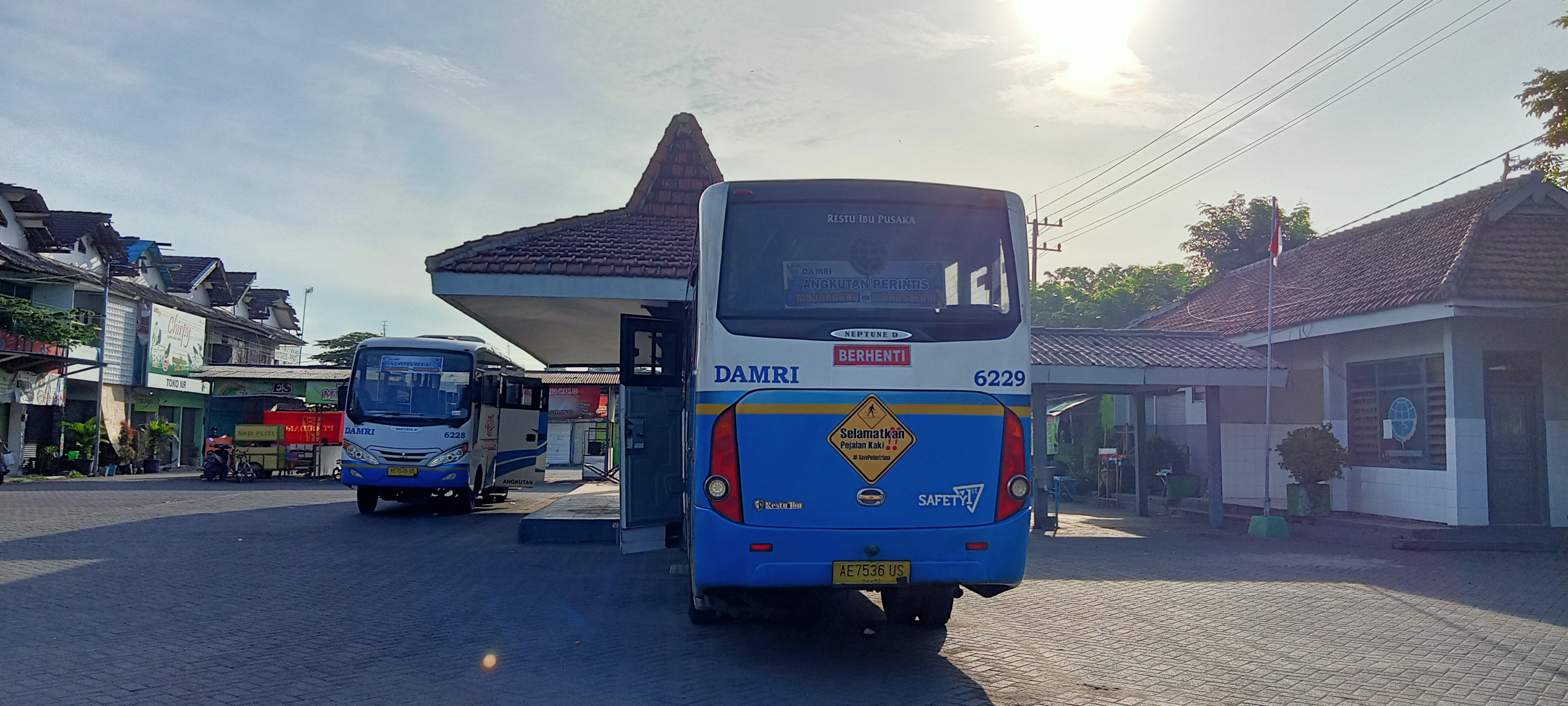
DAMRI pioneer transport

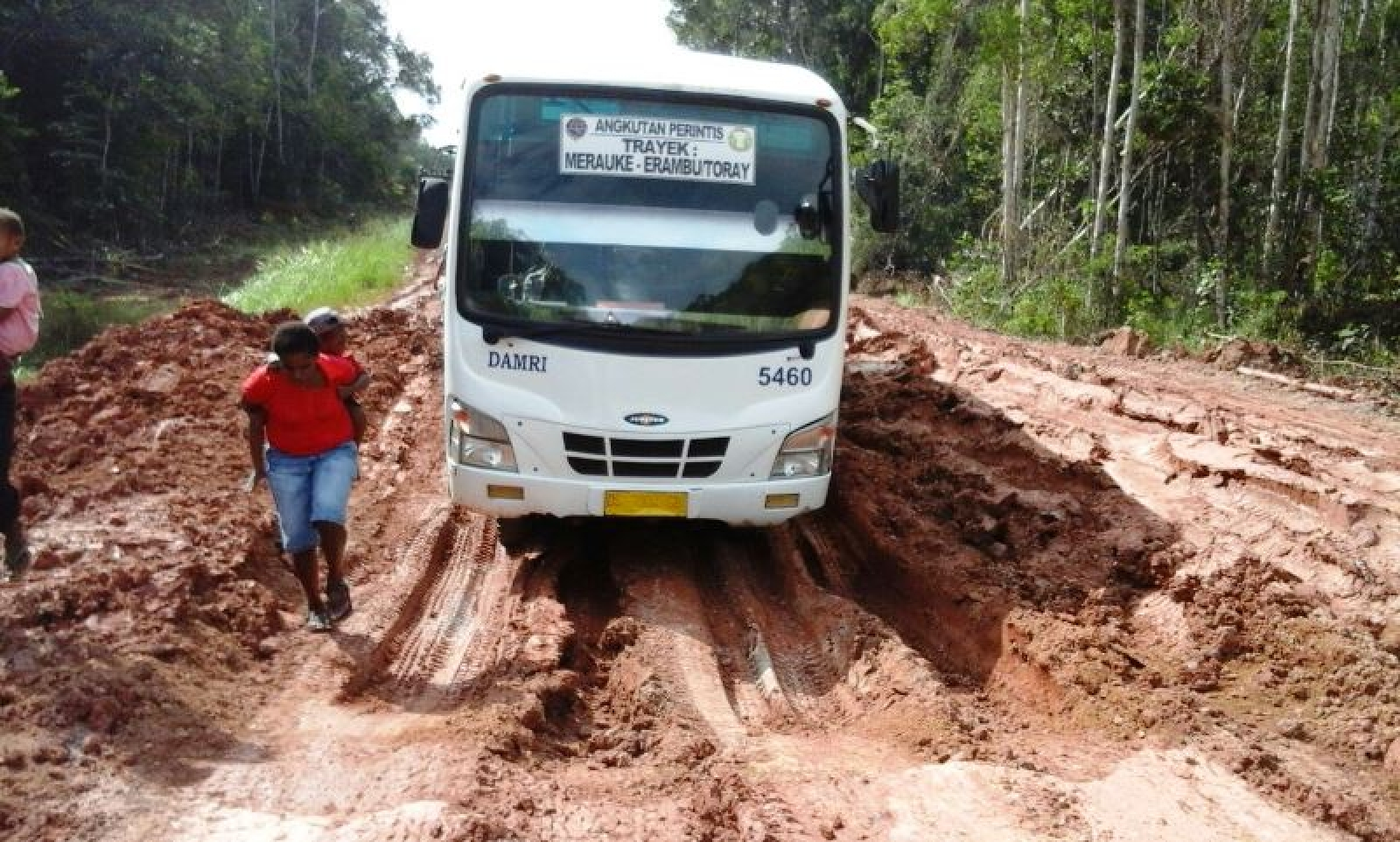
Damri pioneer transport in Merauke

DAMRI serves some remote areas that have not been served by other transport companies. Pioneer transport is a service that serves to the even the remotest regions of Indonesia, sometimes routes with unpaved roads. It mostly serves remote communities of Papua and Kalimantan, where the forests are still thick. Pioneer transport is an assignment from the government to meet the community's need for transportation so that children can go to school, logistics costs can be reduced, and produce can be distributed. Some routes served are:

- Surade – Sagaranteun (Sukabumi)
- Serang - Ciboleger (Lebak)
- Pangandaran – Sindang Barang (Cianjur)
- Sindang Barang (Cianjur) – Teugal Buleud (Sukabumi)
- Ponorogo – Telaga Sarangan (Magetan, East Java)
- Peusangan Siblah Krueng – Bireuen (Aceh)
- Ambon – Werinama (Seram Island)
- Nabire – Paniai (Papua)
- Jayapura - Senggi (Keerom)
- Jayapura – Sarmi (Papua)

=== Tourism transport ===
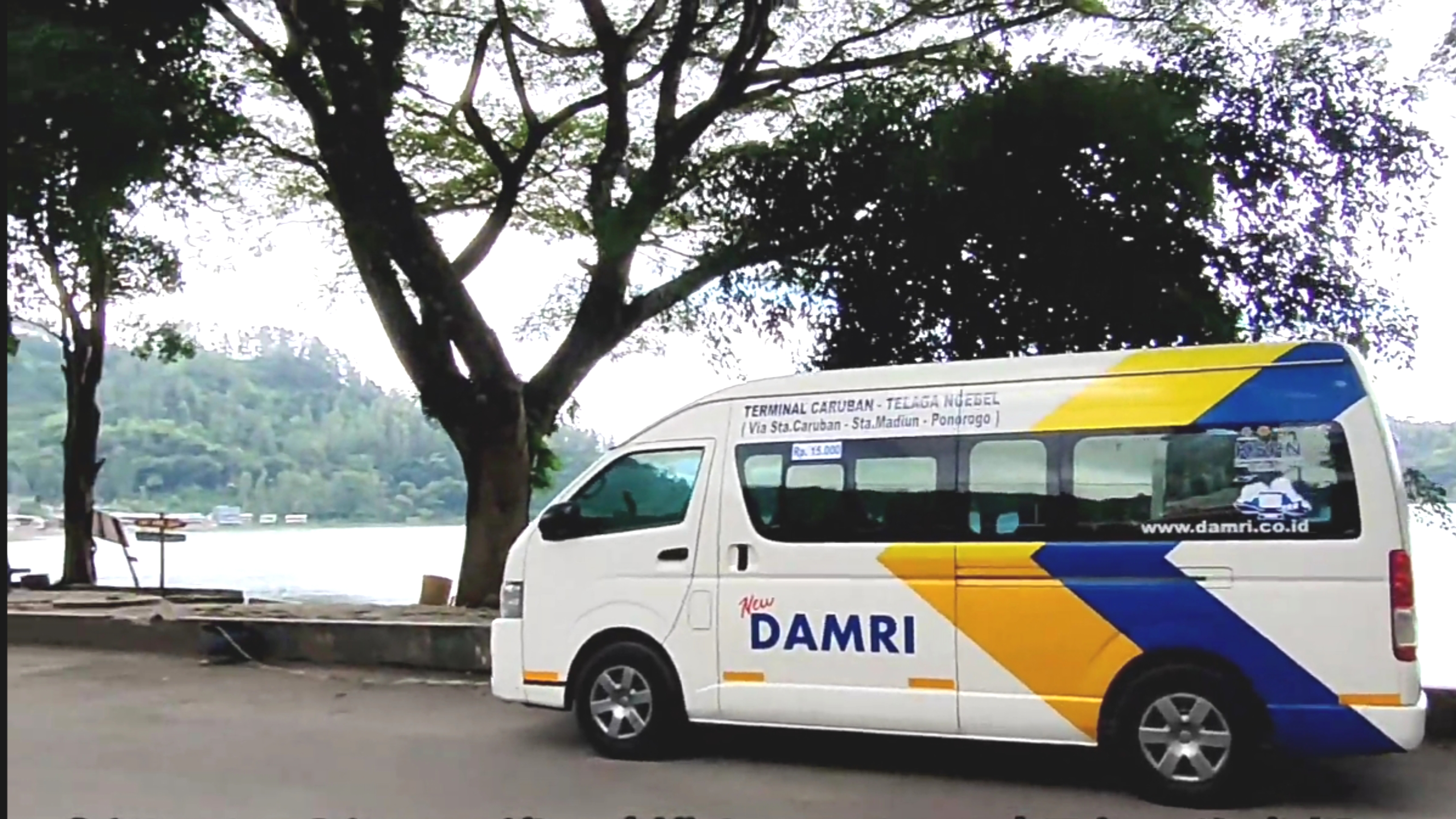
The Toyota HiAce minibus used by DAMRI for its tour service in Madiun Regency

DAMRI also serves tourism transport, using various sizes of bus. The goal is to support the accessibility of tourism sites across Indonesia that have been included on the 'National Tourism Strategic Area' (Kawasan Strategis Pariwisata Nasional or KSPN) program. The routes are:

- Pematangsiantar –Port of Ajibata (North Sumatra)
- Pangkalpinang – Tanjung Berikat (Bangka Belitung Islands)
- Tanjung Pandan – Membalong (Bangka Belitung Islands)
- Madiun Station – Klayar Beach (East Java)
- Caruban Bus Terminal – Telaga Ngebel (East Java)
- Pasar Turi Station – Gubeng Station – Sukapura Bromo Rest Area (East Java)
- Malang Station – Tosaei Bromo Rest Area
- Bangsal – Sembalun Geopark (West Nusa Tenggara)
- Port of Lembar – Mandalika (West Nusa Tenggara)

=== Logistics ===
DAMRI uses trucks to deliver goods in collaboration with PT Pos Indonesia in Medan, Dumai, Surabaya and Mataram in primary and secondary pathways. DAMRI also serves freight transportation as a canal service from train logistics and other private parties.

=== Fleet ===
==== Diesel fuel ====
- Hino Motors
- Isuzu
- King Long
- Mercedes-Benz
- Mitsubishi Motors
- Volvo

==== CNG ====
- AAI Komodo
- Ankai
- Inobus
- Zhongtong Bus

==== Electric ====
- Edison Motors
- Skywell

== See also ==
- City bus in Surabaya
- List of bus operator companies in Indonesia
- Ministry of State Owned Enterprises (Indonesia)
- Pengangkutan Penumpang Djakarta
- TransJakarta
