= International Christian Academy =

International Christian Academy may refer to:

- International Christian Academy (Ivory Coast)
- Yokohama International Christian Academy

== See also ==
- ICA (disambiguation)
- International Christian School (disambiguation)
