= YISS =

YISS may refer to:

- Yongsan International School of Seoul, an international school in Seoul, South Korea
- Yusof Ishak Secondary School, a secondary school in Punggol, Singapore
