= International Christian School, Uijeongbu =

International Christian School Uijongbu
- Gyonggi uijongbu nogyang dong, Jindung-ro 28; Uijongbu; South Korea

Information
- Established: August 1983 (as Liberty Christian School)
- Founder: Joe Hale
- Head of School: Rachael Carpenter
- Grades: Kindergarten through grade 12
- Enrollment: approximately 55 (as of August 2026)
- Associations: NICS, WASC, ACSI, KAIAC, KORCOS, KIMEA
- Sister schools: YISS, ICS-P

The International Christian School of Uijeongbu (Korean: 국제 크리스쳔학교), or ICSU, is a Christian international school founded in 1983 in Uijeongbu, South Korea. It is operated by the administration and is accredited by NICS, ACSI, Korean Department of Education, and WASC.

The campus has a 5-story main campus building which contains the classrooms and a cafeteria.

It is one of the many schools that are part of the NICS organization. It was the first school of its kind, and was founded by Joe Hale, who is also the founder of the NICS organization.

As of August 2026, approximately 55 students are attending ICSU, with a total of 10 faculty and 4 staff members.

ICSU is ACSI and WASC accredited, and is a member of KISAA, KIMEA and KORCOS.

== Academics ==
ICSU currently has an ELD program (English Learning Development), to help students attain a certain level of English proficiency in the areas of speaking, listening, reading, and writing. Also, ICSU has an honors program and an AP program for students in higher levels.

ICSU uses a 1:1 Google Chromebook policy from 1st–12th grade, so that the students can have flexibility in participating

As of 2016, 50% of the faculty completed a Masters program, 78% graduated from a Christian College, and the average staff tenure was 7 years, which is higher than most international schools in Korea.

== Sports and activities ==
ICSU participates in KISAA, with Basketball, Cheerleading, Soccer, Cross Country, and Volleyball. From 2013–2015, ICSU was in the 3rd place in Cross Country, and ICSU also received several sportsmanship awards. From 2018-2019, ICSU will begin a Golf team and will be accepting players from the 4th-12th grades.

ICSU also has a variety of school-activities, such as a Chess Club, National Honor Society, and MUN.

Since 2016, ICSU has a forensics team including Debate and Speech but has not had one since 2017.

== Military ==
International Christian School has been serving to strengthening military families since 1983, when a military Chaplain on Camp Red Cloud encouraged Joe Hale to start an “American” school for the families living in Area 1. ICSU and Area 1 have been partners in education since that day.

== Missions ==
As a faith based Christian school, every class is taught in a Biblical point-of-view. ICSU has chapels each week and daily bible classes. Also, several times in a year, students and teachers from ICSU go on mission trips to various countries and support local organizations.
