= Bandung Alliance Intercultural School =

Coordinates: 6°52′07″S 107°27′59″E

Information
- Established: 1956; 70 years ago
- Grades: Preschool - Grade 12
- Enrollment: 209 (2023-2024)
- Website: baisedu.org

Bandung Alliance Intercultural School (BAIS) is in Kota Baru Parahyangan, a development on the outskirts of Bandung, Indonesia. It has been a member of the Network of International Christian Schools since 1995. Fully accredited through WASC and ACSI, BAIS is a private, non-profit school primarily serving the international community of Bandung. BAIS offers an education based on the international philosophy of education from a Christian perspective for students from pre-school through grade 12. Upon graduation from BAIS, students are prepared for entry into English-speaking universities all over the world.

== History ==
In 1956 the Christian Missionary Alliance (CMA) started the Bandung Alliance International School (BAIS) in the Ciumblueit area of Bandung. It was designed to serve up to 80 students, grades 1–6, in a one-story classroom building. The number of students increased and the school added a second floor to the building. The extra space added room for secondary classes, which also increased space in the office building, and later on, they added a sports field.

The Network of International Christian Schools (NICS) took over management of the school in 1995 and the first graduating senior class was in 2001. To cope with increasing numbers BAIS purchased a 3.5-hectare lot in Kota Baru Parahyangan in 2007, a new development on the outskirts of Bandung.

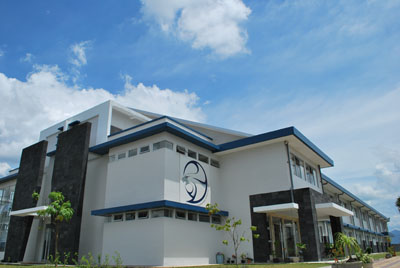
Classroom building

Construction on the classroom/office building was completed in July 2008 with classes starting in August for the 2008–2009 school year. During the 2015–2016 school year, the student body was able to begin use for the full sized soccer field and swimming pool. There are plans to start the office building, auditorium, and indoor gymnasium.

It has an enrollment of 209 students preschool 3-12th grade, as of the 2023–2024 school year.
