= International Christian School (Caracas) =

International Christian School - Caracas
- Caracas, Miranda; Venezuela

Information
- School type: International Christian School
- Founder: Network of International Christian Schools
- School district: Network of International Christian Schools
- Director: Marc Shuflin
- Staff: 12
- Faculty: 18
- Grades: 3 year old preschool-12th Grade
- Age range: 3-18
- Education system: American-International
- Mascot: Tigers
- Accreditation: SACS/AdvancED and ACSI
- Website: http://www.icscaracas.com

International Christian School is an international school located in Caracas, Venezuela. It was founded in 1990 as Academia Cristiana Internacional de Caracas. The school provides preschool (3 year old) through 12th Grade and is accredited by both Middle States Association of Colleges and Schools and Association of Christian Schools International. ICS Caracas is a part of the Network of International Christian Schools.
