= Ica River =

River in Peru

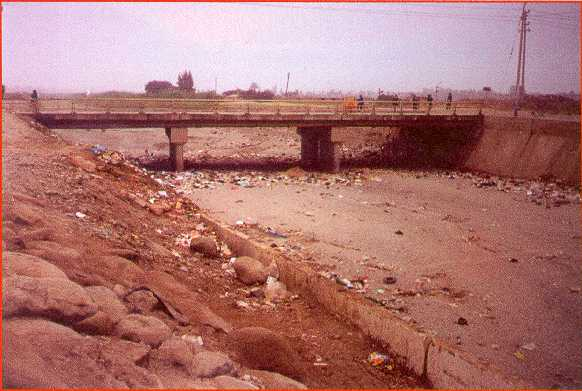
- Pan-American Highway crossing the Ica in the dry period

- Location of mouth

Location
- Country: Peru
- Regions: Huancavelica, Ica

Physical characteristics
- Mouth: Pacific Ocean
  - coordinates: 14°52′15″S 75°33′43″W
- Length: 220 km (140 mi)

The Ica River (Río Ica) is a 220 kilometer long river in Peru which flows south from highlands in Huancavelica Region to the Pacific Ocean through Ica Region and passing the region's capital, the city of Ica.

The river is normally dry during much of the year, but can flood and do major damage as the flood disaster in the city of Ica in 1998 (likely linked to the 1997-98 El Niño event). The Ica valley has an average rainfall of 3 mm a year and a fairly uniform temperature throughout the year with a maximum monthly average of 25 °C in February and a minimum of 17 °C in July.

The natural catchment area for the Ica was 7711 km ², but a project that sought to increase and regulate the water supply, using lake Chuqlluqucha, added 392 km ².

== See also ==
- Ica (disambiguation)
- List of rivers of Peru
- List of rivers of the Americas by coastline
