= International Christian Academy of Nagoya =

International school in Nagoya, Japan

Coordinates: 35°10′15.5″N 137°2′32.9″E

Location
- Villa Yuzan 1F, 205 Kibutake, Nagakute City, Aichi Prefecture, 480-1117 Japan

Information
- Type: International School
- Established: 1991
- Closed: 2021
- Director: Allison Jones
- Grades: PreK to 12th
- Enrollment: 80
- Colors: Red & Gold
- Mascot: Lion
- Accreditation: WASC and ACSI
- Website: icanjapan.org

The International Christian Academy of Nagoya (ICAN; Japanese: 一般財団法人インターナショナル・クリスチャン・アカデミー名古屋) was an international school that was located in the city of Nagakute, a suburb of Nagoya, Aichi, Japan. It was founded in 1991 as the Christian Academy of Nagoya. ICAN has been managed by the Network of International Christian Schools (NICS) since 2001. The school closed as of 2021.

ICAN had class offerings from offering pre-kindergarten through grade 12, and used North American curriculum, with accreditations from both the Western Association of Schools and Colleges (WASC) and the Association of Christian Schools International (ACSI).

ICAN was also the 2012 National History Bee and Bowl champion in the Bowl Division as a team and its students won the top three spots in the 2012 Bee Division for the Japan Division.
