= Al-Irsyad Mosque =

Mosque in Bandung, West Java, Indonesia

- Masjid Al-Irsyad

Religion
- Affiliation: Islam
- Branch/tradition: Sunni

Location
- Location: Padalarang, West Bandung Regency, West Java, Indonesia

Architecture
- Architect: Ridwan Kamil
- Type: Mosque
- Completed: 2010

Al-Irsyad Mosque is a mosque located in West Bandung, West Java, Indonesia, within the Kota Baru Parahyangan housing area. The mosque was built in 2009 and completed in 2010. The mosque is shaped like a cube without a dome. The architects of the mosque are Ridwan Kamil, an architect turned politician who is currently the governor of West Java.

== See also ==
- Islam in Indonesia
- List of mosques in Indonesia
