= Immaculate Conception Academy (disambiguation) =

Immaculate Conception Academy is in Dasmariñas, Cavite, Philippines

Immaculate Conception Academy may also refer to:

- Immaculate Conception Academy of Manila, Philippines
- Immaculate Conception Academy (California), commonly known as ICA Cristo Rey Academy
- Immaculate Conception Academy (Davenport, Iowa), a Catholic girls' high school
- Pontifical Academy of the Immaculate Conception, an academic honorary society, Rome
- Immaculate Conception Academy–Greenhills, San Juan, Metro Manila, Philippines

== See also ==
- ICA (disambiguation)
