= Network of International Christian Schools =

The Network of International Christian Schools (NICS) is an organization that consists of 15 schools in 13 countries in Asia, Africa, South America, Europe and includes an online school in North America. Plans are underway to establish more schools in the near future.

== History ==
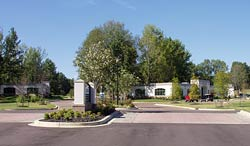
Front view of the entrance to the Network of International Christian Schools headquarters

In 1983, Joe Hale, his wife Ann, and some other missionaries formed Liberty Christian School (International Christian School) in South Korea. They initially anticipated that this school would educate about 30 students, but on the school’s inaugural day 83 students arrived for classes. The school continued to grow, and currently there are three NICS schools in South Korea with a total enrollment of over 1200 students.

It quickly became apparent that there was a need for international schools, particularly Christian ones, in many countries beyond Korea. Schools following the same approach soon appeared in other countries and on other continents. The vast growth of the initial schools was such that the Network of International Christian Schools (NICS) was born in 1991 and a home office was established in Memphis, TN to facilitate the operations and staffing of the schools. In 1992, NICS became an incorporated, independent mission agency. In 2001, the home office was moved to Southaven, MS, a suburb of Memphis, where it remains today. After operating out of the Southaven municipal building for several years, the current location (3790 Goodman Rd. E.) was secured and occupied in the fall of 2007.

The home office is housed in four buildings on 9.5 acres (38,000 m^{2}). There are plans for additional buildings to be built, which will also be used as a conference and training facility. The home office houses 25 employees, as well as the offices of NorthStar International Academy, the online school. Joe Hale serves as the president of NICS and works out of the home office, or international headquarters. Future plans also include the building of a stateside international school.

During the 2020-21 school year, peak enrollment across all NICS schools exceeded 5000 students. There are over 800 teachers serving the 15 schools throughout the organization.

== List of schools ==
- Bandung Alliance Intercultural School, Bandung, Indonesia
- International Christian Academy of Nagoya, Nagoya, Japan (closed)
- West Nairobi School, Nairobi, Kenya
- International Community School, Singapore
- Yongsan International School, Seoul, South Korea
- International Christian School, Uijeongbu
- Prishtina High School, Pristina, Kosovo (Oasis School)
- International School, Far East (Oasis School)
