= Yongsan International School of Seoul =

Yongsan International School of Seoul 서울 용산 국제 학교

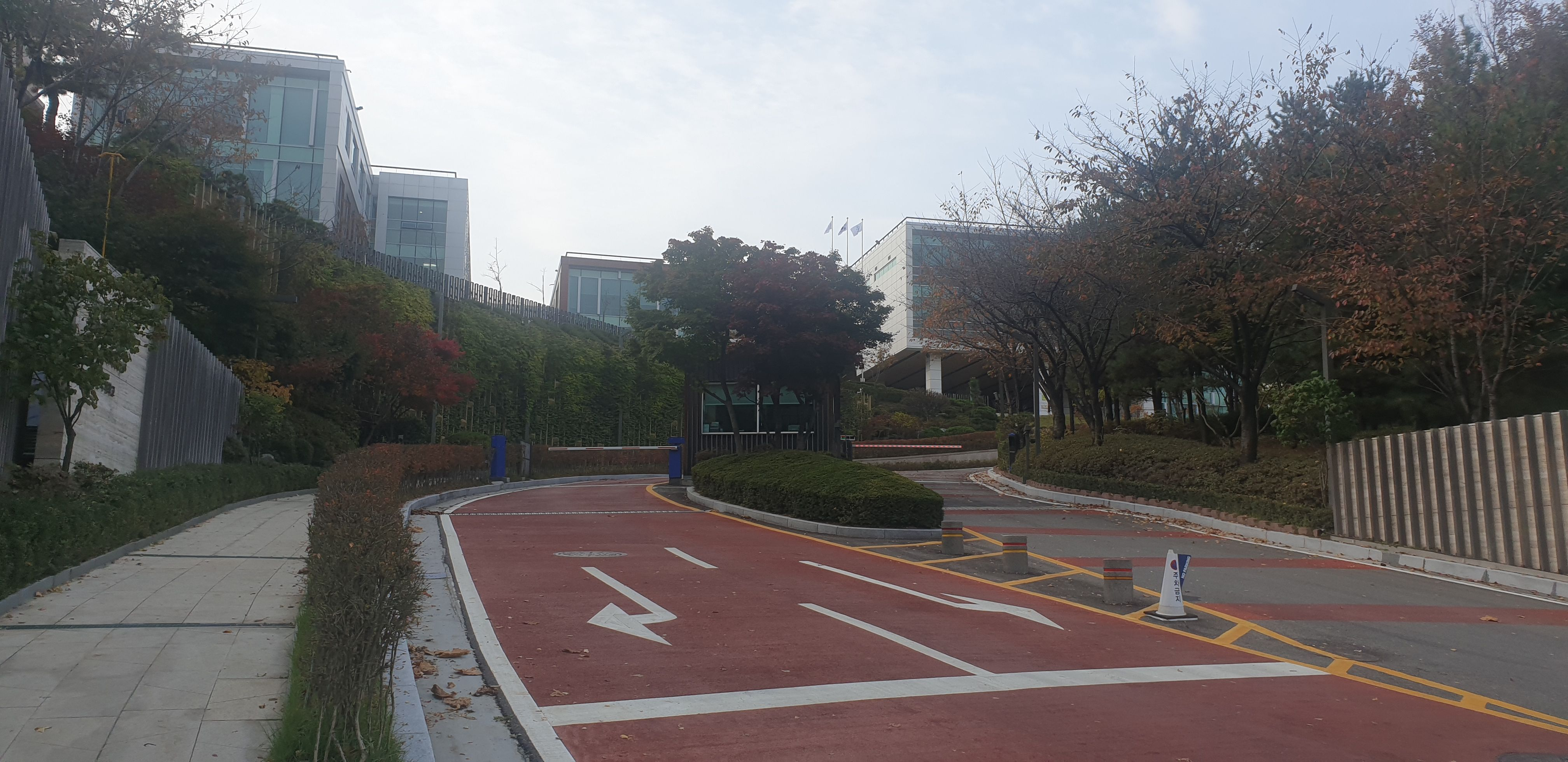

Location
- Seoul; South Korea; 37°32′26″N 127°0′2″E

Information
- Type: Private School
- Established: 1990 (ICS Seoul); 2006 (YISS)
- School district: Yongsan
- Headmaster: Sean Garrick
- Enrollment: ~1000
- Mascot: Guardians
- Website: www.yisseoul.org

Yongsan International School of Seoul (YISS) is a kindergarten (age 5) to 12th grade college-preparatory private international school, operated under a joint agreement between the Korea Foreign Schools Foundation, and the Network of International Christian Schools (NICS) until 2026 when the agreement is set to expire. It is accredited by WASC and ACSI. The school offers both secular and faith-based instructional tracks drawn from the American and standards-based instructional models, as well as a variety of Advanced Placement (AP) courses at the high school level

The student body of approximately 975 students represents 43 countries.

== History ==
In response to expatriate demand for increased foreign school capacity in Seoul, the Korea Foreign School Foundation (KFSF)—an entity of the Korea Chamber of Commerce and Industry—initially envisioned Yongsan International School of Seoul (YISS) as "Asia's best foreign school." Accordingly, in the early 2000s, KFSF began negotiations with what was then considered South Korea’s premier international school—Seoul Foreign School (SFS)—to relocate its British division to the new facilities. The plan was for the British division to become an independent entity, the British International School of Seoul (BISS), offering the IGCSE and the widely recognized International Baccalaureate (IB) program.

By May 2006, Seoul Foreign School had already invested $1.5 million in equipment and teacher recruitment for the establishment of BISS. Plans were in place for students and faculty of the Seoul Foreign British School (SFBS) to move into the new facilities by August 2006. Negotiations between the two parties were still ongoing as late as May of that year when SFBS announced that the process would not move forward. The decision was attributed to the extent of control KFSF sought over "the operations and financial budgets of the new school," which SFBS felt would inhibit their ability to maintain the high-quality international education for which they were known.

KFSF, however, claimed that negotiations reached a stalemate because BISS's plans to offer the IB program did not "meet international standards" and that KFSF needed to "properly handle the project" to assure the Korean public, who helped fund the initiative, that it was being well managed.

When the deal between the preferred bidder, SFBS, and the KFSF fell through due to an 11th-hour impasse, supporters of BISS protested. The European Chamber of Commerce in Korea withdrew from its role in the selection process, and 23 ambassadors to Korea from Europe, Asia, and the Middle East sent letters to the Korean government in protest.

KFSF initiated a new public process to find other operators, with five schools participating. SFBS re-entered negotiations along with the now-defunct Indian Head Foreign School, Early Childhood Learning Center, Korea Foreign School, and International Christian School of Seoul. In July 2006, then-Chairman of the Korea Foreign Schools Foundation, Sohn Kyung-sik, announced that International Christian School/NICS had been selected to run the school. Following the announcement, the expatriate community in Seoul expressed significant frustration over the selection of a faith-based organization to run the new government-supported school. They argued that this decision alienated a large number of non-Christian expatriate families and was unnecessary, given the already prevalent Judeo-Christian orientation of existing international schools in Seoul. At the time, it was reported that Chambers of Commerce from approximately 10 European and Asian countries with vested interests in the school planned to send protest letters to high-ranking officials in the Korean government, objecting to the selection of a Christian organization to operate YISS.

Construction of the facilities was completed in 2006, with a completion ceremony held on June 23, 2006, attended by several high-profile Korean dignitaries, including Seoul Mayor and tenth President of South Korea Lee Myung-bak, Seoul Mayor-elect Oh Se-hoon, Minister of Commerce, Industry, and Energy Chung Sye-kyun, and Korea International Trade Association Chairman Lee Hee-beom.

Just three months after the negotiations between SFBS and KFSF had failed, ICS-Seoul relocated to the new campus in Hannam-dong and was renamed Yongsan International School of Seoul (YISS). The school officially began operations on the new site on August 16, 2006. Since taking over operations at the YISS campus, the student body has grown from approximately 500 students to 975, as of 2024.

== School ==
=== Location ===
YISS is located in Itaewon, Yongsan-gu. The school is built on 23,100 square meters of land leased from the Seoul Metropolitan Government in 2005 for 50 years at a value of 50 billion won (US$50 million). The Ministry of Trade, Industry and Energy provided funding of 13 billion won (US$13 million) for construction costs and the Korea Chamber of Commerce & Industry (KCCI) financed additional costs of 20 billion won (US$20 million).

=== Academics ===
YISS offers a college preparatory program with an emphasis on spiritual and character development. The school provides two programs, NICS and Oasis, to support students' growth. The NICS program encourages students to deepen their understanding of the Gospel, live a life of worship, and share their faith with others. As part of the program, students attend weekly chapel services featuring worship through music and Bible-based messages delivered by chaplains or guest speakers. The Oasis program emphasizes character development and service to others. Students in the Oasis program attend weekly Oasis "Ossemblies" with speakers and activities aimed at developing character traits. To meet the school's accreditation requirements with ACSI, students at each grade level must enroll in at least one semester of direct Bible instruction per semester.

The high school program at YISS culminates with a strong emphasis on Advanced Placement (AP) courses. In 2024, the school reported exceptional academic achievements, with 88% of students enrolled in AP courses earning scores of 3, 4, or 5 on their exams, compared to the worldwide average of 59%. The average AP score for YISS students was 3.9, significantly higher than the global average of 2.8. Additionally, the average SAT score for YISS students was 1407, well above the worldwide average of 1051.

=== Colleges and Universities ===
Graduates have been admitted to many prestigious higher educational institutions including Harvard University, Northwestern University, Dartmouth College, University of Pennsylvania, Columbia University, University of Southern California, University of Chicago, Stanford University, Duke University, Cornell University, UC Berkeley, UCLA, Wesleyan University, Washington University in St. Louis, Carnegie Mellon University, Johns Hopkins University, University of Toronto (Canada), and University College London (UK).

=== Facilities ===
During the summer of 2017, the Korean Foreign Schools Foundation (KFSF) initiated and funded a major renovation of the entrance to YISS. The new additions include a new gate, trellises, sidewalks, a pedestrian staircase, terraced seating, landscaping, and a large metallic mosaic facade. During the summer of 2021 the kindergarten classrooms were extensively renovated to facilitate play-based learning, and a new kindergarten playground area was installed.

== Extracurricular Activities ==
=== Sports ===
YISS competes with international and Department of Defense (DoDDS) schools as a member of the Korean American Interscholastic Activities Conference (KAIAC) in the Blue Division. For international competition, YISS is part of the Asia Christian Schools Conference (ACSC), which includes schools from Guam, Hong Kong, Malaysia, Philippines, Taiwan, and Thailand.

High School Fall Sports (August–October):

- Cross Country (Varsity Boys, JV Boys, Varsity Girls, JV Girls)
- Tennis (Varsity Boys, Varsity Girls)
- Volleyball (Varsity Boys, Varsity Girls, JV Girls)
- ACSC Swim Championships
- ACSC Boys Soccer Tournament

High School Winter Sports (November–February):

- Basketball (Varsity Boys, JV Boys, Varsity Girls, JV Girls)
- Cheerleading (Varsity Girls)
- Swimming (Varsity Boys, Varsity Girls)

High School Spring Sports (February–May):

- Soccer (Varsity Boys, Varsity Girls)
- Track and Field (Varsity Boys, Varsity Girls)
- ACSC Girls Soccer Tournament

Middle School Quarter 1 Sports (August–October):

- Cross Country
- Soccer

Middle School Quarter 2 Sports (October–December):

- Swimming
- Basketball

Middle School Quarter 3 Sports (January–March):

- AQT
- Table Tennis

Middle School Quarter 4 Sports (March–May):

- Tennis
- Volleyball

=== YISS GOES & Immersion ===
The Guardians Outreach Education & Service (GOES) program (formerly known as Guardians with a Message (GWAM)) provides high school students with opportunities to serve and learn in Korea and throughout Asia during Spring Break. About half of the high school student body participates.

Immersion is a program created with middle schoolers in mind. There are three foundational pieces of this program: spiritual growth and development, community service, and cultural immersion.

GOES and Immersion trips send students to places such as Manila, Baguio, Bangkok, Phnom Pehn, Hong Kong, Shanghai, Yanji, Gunsan, Geoje, Jeju, and Taebaek.

=== Others ===
Students participate in Model United Nation events such as BEIMUN and SEOMUN. They also participate in the Chess Tournament.

== Controversy ==
In 2006, the selection of the International Christian School to operate Yongsan International School of Seoul sparked significant controversy. This decision prompted protests from 23 countries, including European nations such as the Netherlands and Norway, as well as India, Canada, and South Africa, citing concerns over transparency and bias in the process. Critics, including embassies and chambers of commerce, accused the Korea Chamber of Commerce and Industry (KCCI) and the Korea Foreign School Foundation (KFSF) of facilitating the school’s establishment through a rushed and secretive re-bidding process that favored a specific religious group. Allegations of mismanagement, such as hidden board meeting records and exclusive decision-making by KCCI, eroded trust within the international community and damaged Korea’s investment environment. Many foreign investors expressed dissatisfaction, with some refusing to work in Korea due to the controversy.

In 2008, the school admitted to enrolling 8-10 Korean students who did not meet eligibility requirements, as they were the children of Korean administrators at the school. It also exempted these families from paying tuition, which at the time was approximately $20,000 per year. Although the school stated that the students subsequently been dissenrolled, the Seoul Metropolitan Office of Education launched an investigation into the alleged violations. Critics argued that the irregularities highlight broader issues of inadequate oversight of international schools in Korea, as well as concerns over the misuse of government funding intended to support foreign investors' children.

In May 2023 a group of 300 parents signed a petition requesting NICS and the KFSF to dismiss the Headmaster that had been appointed in the weeks prior; NICS and KFSF did not do so. Members of the teacher and parent community requested for a reorganization of the foundation board and termination of its contract with NICS.

In 2024, seven current and former employees submitted complaints to the National Human Rights Commission of Korea, alleging that the schools hiring practices discriminate against Korean nationals, individuals of Korean descent, or spouses of Korean nationals.

== See also ==
- Namsan (Seoul)
