= Islamitisch College Amsterdam =

Secondary school in Amsterdam, the Netherlands

Islamitisch College Amsterdam (ICA), was an Islamic secondary school in Amsterdam, Netherlands. It was established in 2001, and had 750 students as of 2005. In 2010, the Minister of Education decided to no longer fund the school and in 2012 the school went bankrupt and the legal entity ceased to exist.

== See also ==
- Islam in the Netherlands
