= Kota Baru Parahyangan =

Kota Baru Parahyangan or KBP is a planned city located at Padalarang, West Bandung Regency in Indonesia. It was developed with the vision and spirit as a City Of Education. Total land area of the township is 1,250 hectares including land for 200 hectares of lakes.

== Infrastructures ==
After the first stage of the development of the township was completed. In the second stage of development a town center was built along with a 18 hole golf course area, landed houses, and other commercial projects. IKEA has an outlet in the township. There is a horizontal Sun clock in the township which is the biggest in Indonesia.

=== Housing complexes ===
Each residential cluster of the township is equipped with parks that have different themes. Parks are implemented with the concept of non-formal education through design and game objects. The architectural concept adopts history which is implemented in residential buildings.

- Wangsakerta
- Pitaloka
- Ratnasasih
- Jingganagara
- Banyaksumba
- Larangtapa
- Mayang Padma
- Kamandaka
- Naganingrum
- Candra Resmi
- Tejakancana
- Purbasari
- Lokacitra

The complexes are equipped with houses built by KBP.

=== IKEA ===
On March 28, 2021, IKEA opened its third store in Kota Baru Parahyangan. It is the first store to open outside of the Greater Jakarta Metropolitan Area.

Although the store was set to open in the latter half of 2020, the opening of the store was delayed to 2021 as a result of the COVID-19 pandemic.

=== Wahoo Waterworld ===
On March 31, 2020 a Viral Water park opened, which was the largest water park in West Java. Featuring multiple large water slides, and a nearby man made lake. Wahoo Waterworld Bandung

=== Schools ===
For formal education, there is a national standard plus schools that refer to American Classical School Curriculum, from the level of kindergarten to high school. Also has been established Bandung Alliance International School, International Foreign Language Academy (ABAI).

- Bandung Alliance Intercultural School (BAIS)

This school is located at Jalan Bujanggamanik Kav. 2. It moved from Ciumblueit, after its 52 years of serving. Website: .

- Cahaya Bangsa Classical School (CBCS)

The school is located at Jalan Bujangga Manik Kav. 1 (right before BAIS)

- Al-Irsyad Satya Islamic School

The school is an Islamic private school, and is affiliated with Madrasah Irsyad Zuhri Al-Islamiah of Singapore.

- Sekolah Bina Persada

The school is a national plus school providing a Cambridge curriculum. The school is located at Jl. Gelap Nyawang No.Kav 5A.

=== Al-Irsyad Mosque ===
This unique and magnificent mosque is built in the shape of the cube evoking the Ka’aba.

=== Bale Pare (shopping and eating) ===
There are restaurants such as Olive Chinese Restaurant, Planet Drinks, and many small restaurants. There is one small convenience store called AlfaMart.

== Transportation ==
The township can be accessed by Purbaleunyi Toll Road through the Padalarang toll gate. Shuttle bus operates Parahyangan to Leuwi Panjang route via Purbaleunyi Toll Road.
