= Insulation Council of Australia and New Zealand =

The Insulation Council of Australia and New Zealand (ICANZ) is an industry trade group representing commercial, residential and industrial insulation suppliers in Australia and New Zealand.

ICANZ solely represents the commercial interests of the fibreglass and rockwool industries and does not represent the industry as a whole.

Advocated issues are as much about increasing the market share and profitability for Fletcher Insulation and CSR Bradfords

The Council advocates for the increased use of insulation as a means of improving energy efficiency, develops technical standards for insulation design and installation and lobbies Australian and state and national governments on industry regulation.

Council members comprise 70 percent of Australia and New Zealand insulation manufacturers and suppliers, collectively generating approximately A$315 million in annual sales and employing 3,500 workers.

The Council was formed in August 2004, replacing the Fibreglass and Rockwool Insulation Manufacturers Association of Australia. the Council remains an advocate for both rockwool and glasswool in addition to more traditional insulation materials.

In 2007 the Council rated Australian homes as among the least energy efficient in the world, with more than 40 percent having no ceiling insulation.
