= Yokohama International Christian Academy =

Location
- Yokohama Chuo YMCA Bldg., 1-7, Tokiwa-cho, Naka-ku; Yokohama 231-8458; Japan
- Coordinates: 35.4374°N 139.6495°E

Information
- Motto: Learn, Grow, Excel
- Religious affiliation: Christianity
- Years offered: PreK-G12
- Gender: co-ed
- Telephone: 81+45-226-2071
- Fax: 81+45-226-2072
- Issuu documents: http://www.issuu.com/yica_issuu_docs
- Website: https://web.archive.org/web/20100529100810/http://www.yica.co.jp:80/

Yokohama International Christian Academy (YICA) is a PreK-G12 co-ed independent international school that strives to foster self-empowerment, mutual respect and responsible global citizenship among all children within the framework of a Christian-centered learning environment. YICA serves children of any faith, ethnicity or nationality. YICA boats highly qualified teaching and support staff from around the world in an atmosphere that encourages appreciation for diversity and deep respect for Japanese customs. Due to the low teacher-student ratio, teachers flexibly customize courses to meet individual needs while encouraging children to do their best and achieve effective learning.

== Student body ==
As of 2008, 70% of the students were Japanese nationals. Many of them have non-Japanese parents and/or are kikokushijo (returnees). In 2008 YICA headmaster Federico Sancho stated that beginning in the mid-1990s the proportion of Japanese nationals had been increasing.
