= Institute of Contemporary Art =

Institute of Contemporary Art(s) or Institute for Contemporary Art may refer to:

== United States ==
Alphabetical by state

- Institute of Contemporary Art, Los Angeles, California
- Institute of Contemporary Art, San Diego, California, in San Diego
- Institute of Contemporary Art San Francisco, California
- Institute of Contemporary Art San José, California
- Institute of Contemporary Art (Miami), Florida
- Institute of Contemporary Art, Boston, Massachusetts
- Institute of Contemporary Art, Philadelphia, Pennsylvania
- Halsey Institute of Contemporary Art, Charleston, South Carolina
- Institute of Contemporary Art, Chattanooga, Tennessee, in Chattanooga, Tennessee
- Institute for Contemporary Art, Richmond, Virginia, US

== Other countries ==
Alphabetical by country

- Perth Institute of Contemporary Arts, Perth, Australia
- Institute for Contemporary Art, Zagreb, Croatia
- Institute of Contemporary Arts Singapore, Singapore
- Institute of Contemporary Arts, London, England, UK
