= Korea Foreign School =

- 코리아외국인학교
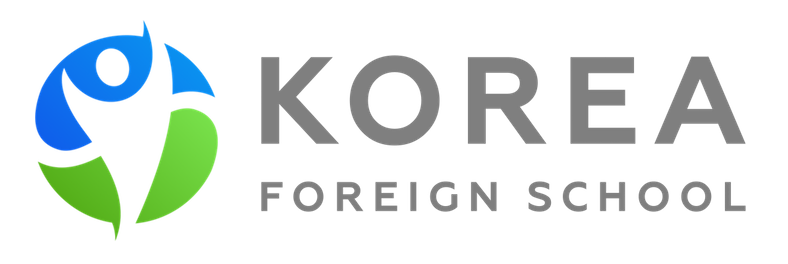

Location
- Seoul Gangnam-gu Yeoksam-ro 509; South Korea; 37°29′5.06″N 127°2′27.68″E

Information
- Type: Private School, Day School Coeducational
- Motto: Excellence In Lifelong Learning
- Established: 2007
- School district: Gangnam
- Grades: 1–12
- Colours: Green, Blue, and White
- Team name: Eagles
- Affiliation: Western Association of Schools and Colleges, the Council of International Schools, the East Asia Regional Council of Overseas Schools and the Korea Council of Overseas Schools
- Website: www.koreaforeign.org

Korea Foreign School (KFS) is a non-profit private coeducational day-school in the Gangnam Area of Seoul, South Korea. KFS is established and operated under the Seoul Metropolitan Office of Education. Korea Foreign School educates children from grade 1 through grade 12.

== Accreditation and memberships ==
KFS is accredited by the Council of International Schools (CIS) and the Western Association of Schools and Colleges (WASC). The school is an affiliated member of the National Association of Independent Schools (NAIS), the East Asia Regional Council of Overseas Schools (EARCOS), and the Korea Council of Overseas Schools (KORCOS).

== Curriculum ==
KFS is currently an IB World School of IB Primary Years Programme (PYP) and Middle Years Programme (MYP). Using the IB curriculum framework, KFS provides an international education for students in grades 1–10. The PYP focuses on the development of the whole child as an inquirer, both in the classroom and in the world outside. It is defined by six transdisciplinary themes of global significance, explored using knowledge and skills derived from six subject areas, with a powerful emphasis on inquiry-based learning. Subjects Offered: Primary Years Programme (PYP) 1. Reading & Writing 2. Mathematics 3. Science 4. Social Studies 5. Arts 6. Languages – Korean 7. Life Skills 8. Physical, Social and Personal Education

The Middle Years Programme grades 6-10 includes the following 8 curricular areas: Group #1: Language and Literature (English) based on Readers' and Writers' Workshop model (Teacher's College, Columbia University) Group #2: Acquired Language (English, Spanish and Korean) Group #3: Humanities (Individuals & Societies, History, Economics, Politics etc.) Group #4: Integrated Science (Earth Science, Biology, Chemistry, Physics) Group #5: Mathematics based on Singapore Math program Group #6: Art, Drama, Film Group #7: Design Technology Group #8: Physical and Health Education KFS adopted the Common Core State Standards (CCSS), the Next Generation Science Standards (NGSS), and the National Standards for Social Studies.

== After school activities ==
Korea Foreign School offers a wide variety of after school activities including:

- Basketball
- Clay dough
- Coding
- Drama
- Golf
- Group games
- Gymnastics
- Handcraft
- Hapkido
- LEGO
- Newspaper/news and video production
- Robotics
- Soccer
- Spanish
- Mandarin
- Table tennis
