= Prishtina High School =

High school in Kosovo

Coordinates: 42.64412°N 21.19993°E

Prishtina High School provides an American-style education in Kosovo. The school is located in the Matiqan region of Prishtina. Classes first began on 1 September 2007. They started working with only 2600 students the first year. The teachers all came from the U.S. Don Tingle was the principal of the school and he was the one to work with the Ministry of Education in order to get the school licensed. At the beginning of 2010-2011 year 15 students have enrolled, including the high school and a middle school program for grades 6 to 8. Now, PHS, as an internationally accredited American-style school, offers grades 1 to 12.

Students there have to complete the following subjects: 4 years of English, Math, Science, History, Language, Physical Education, Fine Arts. In order to graduate, a student must complete a minimum of 200 credits. A 67% in each class is required to pass the course. Completing 2 hours of community service each year is required too.

In 2018, BABA High School joined the Oasis Network of International Schools.

== Credits ==
| | Students Graduating in 2014 or earlier | All students graduating in 2015 or later |
|---|---|---|
| High School English | 4 Credits | 4 Credits |
| High School Math | 3 Credits | 4 Credits |
| High School Science | 3 Credits | 4 Credits |
| High School History | 3 Credits | 4 Credits |
| High School Language | 2 Credits | 2 Credits |
| High School PE | 2 Credits | 2 Credits |
| Fine Arts | 1 Credit | 1 Credit |

== Grading Scale ==
| A + | 100 - 98% |
| A | 97 - 92% |
| A - | 91 - 90% |
| B + | 89 - 88% |
| B | 87 - 82% |
| B - | 81 - 80% |
| C + | 79 - 78% |
| C | 77 - 72% |
| C - | 71 - 70% |
| NRY (Not Ready Yet) | 69 - 0% |

== Plagiarism and Cheating Policy ==
Plagiarism shows lack of responsibility in an active learner. If a student is found to have plagiarized on any assignment, quiz, test, a zero will be given. If a student is caught plagiarizing or cheating on a major assignment, quiz, test, a total of three times during a semester, the student will receive a semester grade of “NRY” and fail the course.

== Online and Dual Credit Classes ==
Prishtina High School partners with MU High School through the University of Missouri to offer students access to high school and advanced courses not offered at PHS. Prishtina High School partners with Bethany College, Lindsborg Kansas, in offering two courses for dual credit: MA102 College Algebra and MA130 Analytic Geometry and Calculus 1.

== RenWeb ==
Prishtina High School uses RenWeb School Management Software to help students and parents know about their grades, access homework assignments and lesson plans, find the teachers' e-mails and contact them, and see photos, news, and dates from the school calendar.
