= Islamic Cultural Association (Hong Kong) =

Religious organization based in Eastern, Hong Kong, China

- 香港伊斯蘭文化協會
- Formation: 2004
- Headquarters: North Point, Eastern District, Hong Kong
- Region served: Hong Kong
- Website: Official website

The Islamic Cultural Association (Hong Kong) (ICA; traditional Chinese: 香港伊斯蘭文化協會; simplified Chinese: 香港伊斯兰文化协会; Cantonese Yale: Hēunggóng Yīsīlàahn Màhnfa Hihpwuih) is an Islamic organisation in Hong Kong. It was formed in 2004 and became a government-approved charitable institution.

== Functions ==
=== Objectives ===
- Promote Islamic culture with Quran and Sunnah as its core
- Promote exchanges between Islamic culture and other cultures
- Enhance research and development of Islamic education and Islamic culture

=== Scope of work ===
ICA's major scope of work includes academic research, education, culture and charity. Since 2009, the ICA has participated the Hong Kong Book Fair organised by the Hong Kong Trade Development Council, one of Asia's largest book fair.

== Events ==
In 2009, they co-organised the International Conference on Transmission of Islamic Culture and Education in China (中國伊斯蘭文化與教育的傳承」國際研討會) in co-operation with the centre for the Study of Religion and Chinese Society of the Chinese University of Hong Kong's Chung Chi College.

== See also ==
- Islam in China
- Islam in Hong Kong
