= Colegio Monteverde =

Colegio Monteverde may refer to:

- Colegio Monteverde (Chile), Santiago de Chile
- Colegio Monteverde (Mexico), Mexico City
- Centro Educativo Monteverde, Cancun, Mexico
