= Centro Educativo Monteverde =

Location
- Av. Bonampak MZ 2 Lote 5 SM 10B, San Buenaventura; Cancún, Quintana Roo; Mexico; 21°8′3″N 86°49′32″W

Information
- Type: Private school
- Established: 1996
- Head of school: Tom Pearl
- Colors: Navy and yellow
- Team name: Wolves
- Website: https://monteverde.edu.mx

Monteverde International School (Spanish: Centro Educativo Monteverde) is a private school in Cancún, Mexico. It serves preschool through high school (preparatoria).

Cecilia Alcántara founded the school in the northern hemisphere summer of 1996. The first school building was constructed at Av. Kohunlich in Super Manzana 46 during the summer of 1997. Construction of the current campus on Av. Bonampak, Super Manzana 10B, began as of the 2001/2002 school year.
