= Colegio Monteverde (Chile) =

School in Santiago, Chile

Coordinates: 33.4720°S 70.5514°W

Information
- Website: web.colegiomonteverde.cl

Colegio Monteverde is a Chilean school located in Santiago.
