= Bushra =

Bushra (بشرى) is an Arabic feminine given name meaning "waterfall", "omen", or "perfect". Variants of the name include Boshra, Boushra, and the Turkish Büşra. This name is also given to girls in Pakistan, Jordan and Egypt.. Notable people with the name include:

== People ==
=== Boshra ===
- Boshra Dastournezhad (born 1985), Iranian-born model, and actress on stage and film
- Boshra Al-Shaeby (born 1995), Jordanian chess player
- Boshra Salem, Egyptian professor and scholar of land degradation and desertification

=== Boushra ===
- Boushra Almutawakel (born 1969), Yemeni photographer

=== Bushra ===
- Bushra (Egyptian actress) (born 1981), Egyptian actress
- Bushra Afreen, Bangladeshi climate specialist
- Bushra Amiwala (born 1997), American activist
- Bushra Ansari (born 1956), Pakistani actress, comedian, singer and playwright
- Bushra al-Assad (born 1960), first child and only daughter of Hafez al-Assad, former president of Syria
- Bushra Ateeq, Indian medical researcher
- Bushra Bibi (born 1971), Pakistani spiritualist, homemaker and the third spouse of the Prime Minister of Pakistan Imran Khan
- Bushra Al-Bustani (born 1949), Iraqi poet
- Bushra Anjum Butt (born 1981), Pakistani politician, member of the Provincial Assembly of the Punjab
- Bushra Elfadil (born 1952), Sudanese writer
- Bushra Fakhoury, British sculptor
- Bushra Farrukh (born 1957), Pakistani poet
- Bushra Al Fusail, Yemeni photographer and women's rights activist
- Bushra Gohar (born 1961), Pakistani politician and Pashtun human rights activist
- Bushra Hyder, Pakistani schoolteacher and peace activist
- Bushra Junaid, Canadian artist, curator and arts administrator
- Bushra Khalfan (born 1969), Omani writer
- Bushra Khalil, Lebanese lawyer
- Bushra al-Maqtari (born 1979), Yemeni writer and activist
- Bushra Massouh (born 1958), Syrian politician
- Bushra Mateen (1943–2021), Pakistani educator
- Bushra Qayyum (born 1995), Pakistani badminton player
- Bushra Rahman (1944–2022), Pakistani politician who served as member of the National Assembly of Pakistan
- Bushra Razack (born 1986), South African community development specialist
- Bushra Rehman, Pakistani-American novelist
- Bushra Rind, Pakistani politician, member of the Provincial Assembly of Balochistan
- Bushra Shaikh (born 1982), British media personality, broadcaster, and activist
- Bushra al-Tawil, Palestinian journalist
- Bushra al-Thamali, Abbasid military commander and governor (wali or amir)
- Bushra El-Turk (born 1982), British composer

=== Büşra ===
- Büşra Ahlatcı (born 1994), Turkish footballer
- Büşra Akay (born 2005), Turkish sprinter
- Büşra Akbaş (born 1995), Turkish basketball player
- Büşra Beyazbal (born 1998), Turkish martial artist
- Büşra Çan (born 2006), Turkish weightlifter
- Büşra Develi (born 1993), Turkish actor
- Büşra Emire (born 2005), Turkish para taekwondo practitioners
- Büşra Güneş (born 1997), Turkish volleyball player
- Büşra Işıkhan (born 1999), Turkish handball player
- Büşra Işıldar (born 2002), Turkish boxer
- Büşra Katipoğlu (born 1992), Turkish judoka
- Büşra Kılıçlı (born 1990), Turkish volleyball player
- Büşra Kuru (born 2001), German-born Turkish footballer
- Büşra Mutay (born 1990), Turkish track and field athlete competing in long jump and triple jump
- Büşra Pekin (born 1982), Turkish actress
- Büşra Nur Tırıklı (born 1994), Turkish Paralympian discus thrower
- Büşra Ün (born 1994), Turkish wheelchair archer and former Paralympian wheelchair tennis player
- Büşra Yalçınkaya (born 1996), Turkish female badminton player

== Fiction ==
- Bushra Abbasi, a fictional character in EastEnders

== See also ==
- Bushra (Jordan), also known as (Bishra), town in the governorate of Irbid, Jordan
