= Mateen =

Mateen is a given name and surname of Arabic origin. Notable people with the name include:

== Given name ==
- Chaudhary Mateen Ahmed (born 1958), Indian National Congress politician
- Mateen Ansari (1915–1943), in the Indian Army during World War II, member of the British Army Aid Group, awarded the George Cross posthumously
- Mateen Bolkiah (born 1991), tenth child of Hassanal Bolkiah, Sultan of Brunei and his former wife, Hajah Mariam
- Mateen Cleaves (born 1977), American basketball player

== Surname ==
- A. T. M. Abdul Mateen (1925–2001), Pakistani politician
- Bushra Mateen (1943–2021), vice chancellor of Lahore College for Women University
- Ernest Mateen (1966–2012), United States and world cruiserweight boxing champion
- Omar Mateen (1986–2016), US mass murderer in Orlando, Florida and perpetrator of the 2016 Orlando nightclub shooting
- Sabir Mateen (born 1951), American avant-garde jazz musician and composer
- Syidah Mateen (born 1964), plaintiff in a court case in North Carolina, US, seeking to allow Muslims to swear on the Qur'an instead of the Bible

== See also ==
- Macteens
