= Gymnasium (Germany) =

Type of secondary school in Germany

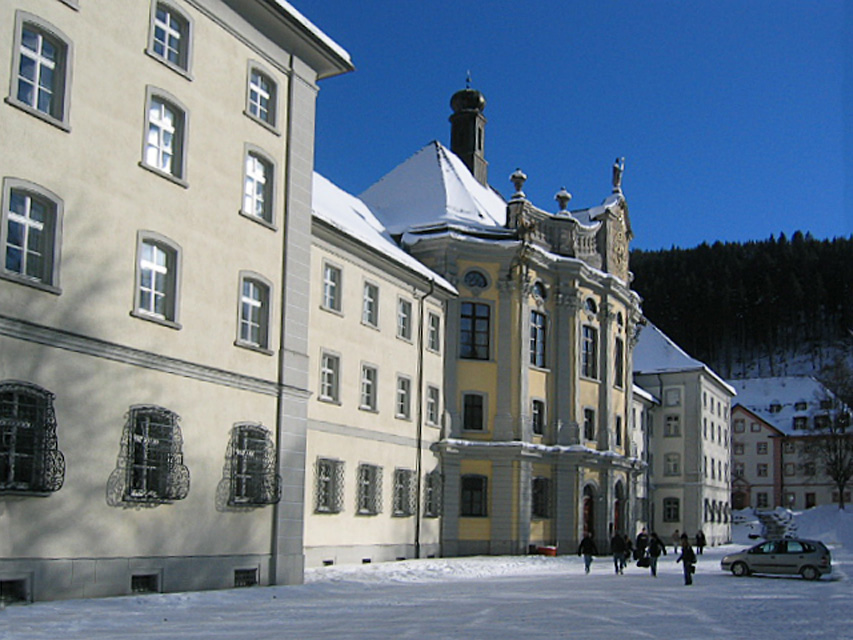
The Kolleg St. Blasien in a former Benedictine monastery

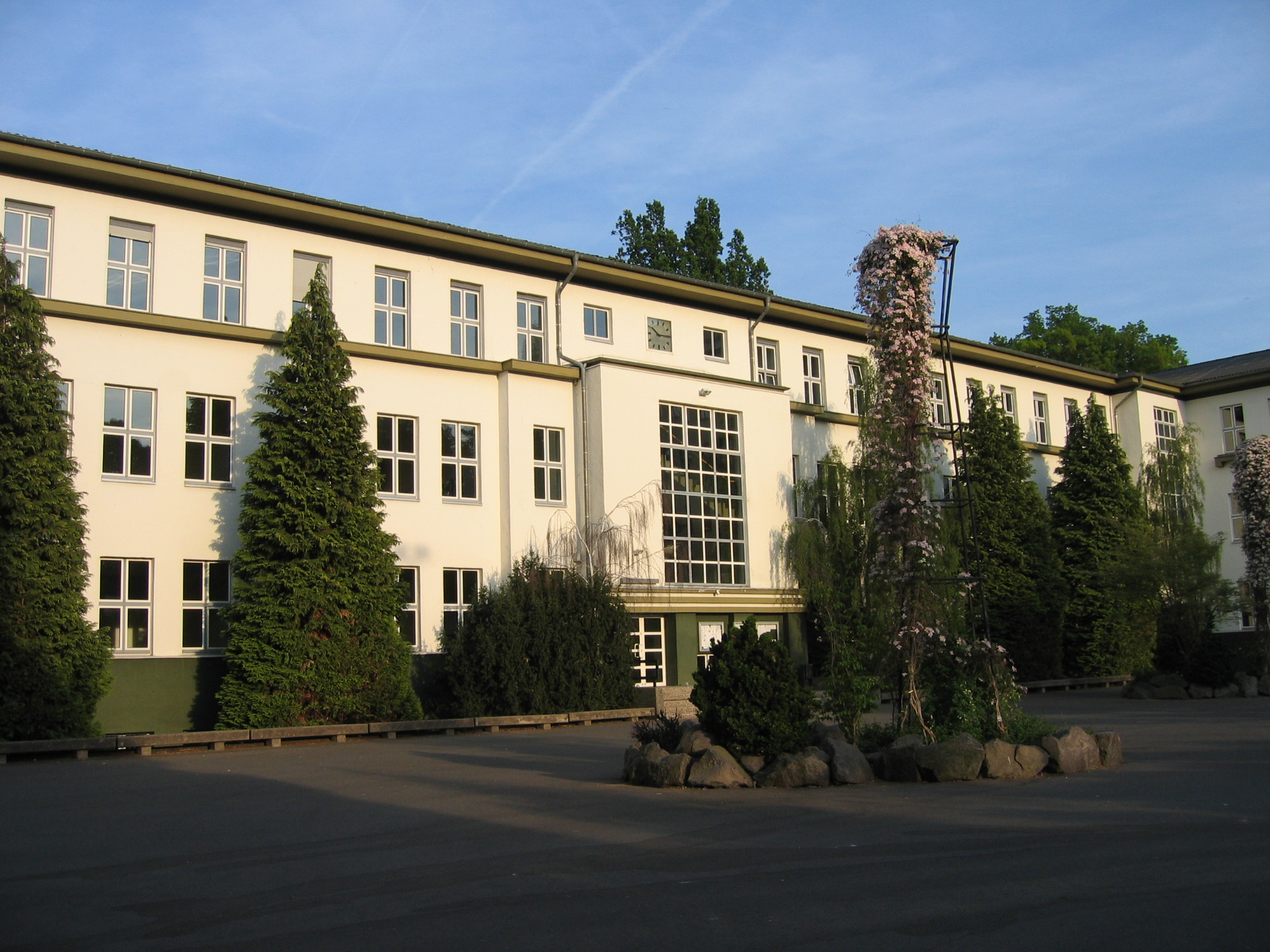
The Aloisiuskolleg

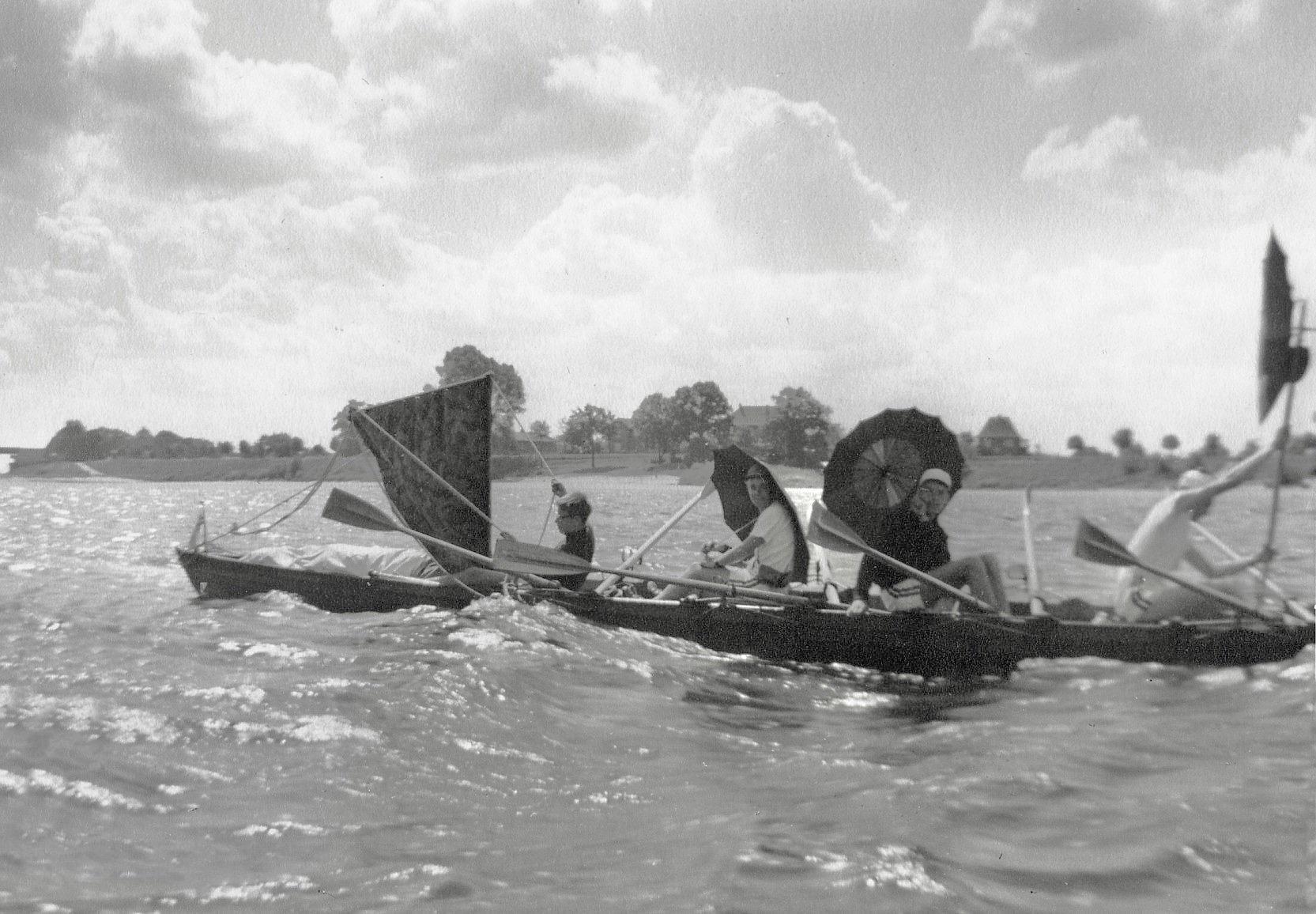
Gymnasiasts sailing a rowboat on the Unterelbe in 1959

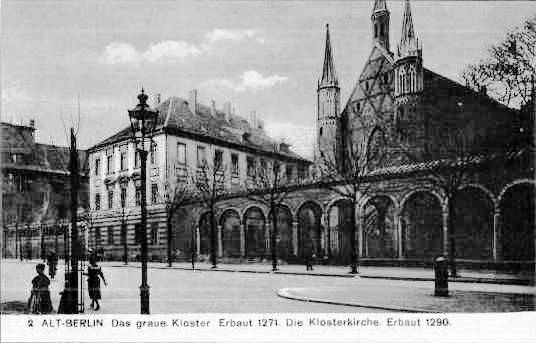
Berlinisches Gymnasium zum Grauen Kloster (1910)

Gymnasium (German: [ɡʏmˈnaːzi̯ʊm]; German plural: Gymnasien), in the German education system, is the most advanced and highest of the three types of German secondary schools, the others being Hauptschule (lowest) and Realschule (middle). Gymnasium strongly emphasizes academic learning, comparable to the British grammar school system or with prep schools in the United States. A student attending Gymnasium is called a Gymnasiast (German plural: Gymnasiasten). In 2009/10 there were 3,094 gymnasia in Germany, with c. 2,475,000 students (about 28 percent of all precollegiate students during that period), resulting in an average student number of 800 students per school.

Gymnasia are generally public, state-funded schools, but some parochial and private gymnasia also exist. In 2009/10, 11.1 percent of gymnasium students attended a private gymnasium. These often charge tuition fees, though many also offer scholarships. Tuition fees are lower than in comparable European countries. Some gymnasia are boarding schools, while others run as day schools; they are now predominantly co-educational, and few single-sex schools remain.

Students are generally admitted at 10 years of age and are required to have completed four years (six in Berlin and Brandenburg, where they are enrolled at 12) of Grundschule (primary education). In some German states, permission to apply to a gymnasium is nominally dependent on a letter of recommendation from a teacher or a certain GPA. However, when parents petition, an examination can be used to decide the outcome.

Traditionally, a pupil attended a gymnasium for nine years in Western Germany. However, in the early 2000s, there was a strong political movement to reduce the time spent at the gymnasium to eight years throughout Germany; for a short time most pupils throughout Germany attended the gymnasium for 8 years (referred to as G8), dispensing with the traditional ninth year or oberprima (except in Rhineland-Palatinate). In 2014, Lower Saxony became the first federal state to switch back to G9, i.e., reintroducing the 13th year, with several states following, most recently Bavaria (2024), North Rhine-Westphalia (2025) and Schleswig-Holstein (2025).

Final-year students take the Abitur exams. The results of these exams are combined with grades achieved over the last two years of school (Qualifikationsphase) to obtain the final grade.

== History ==
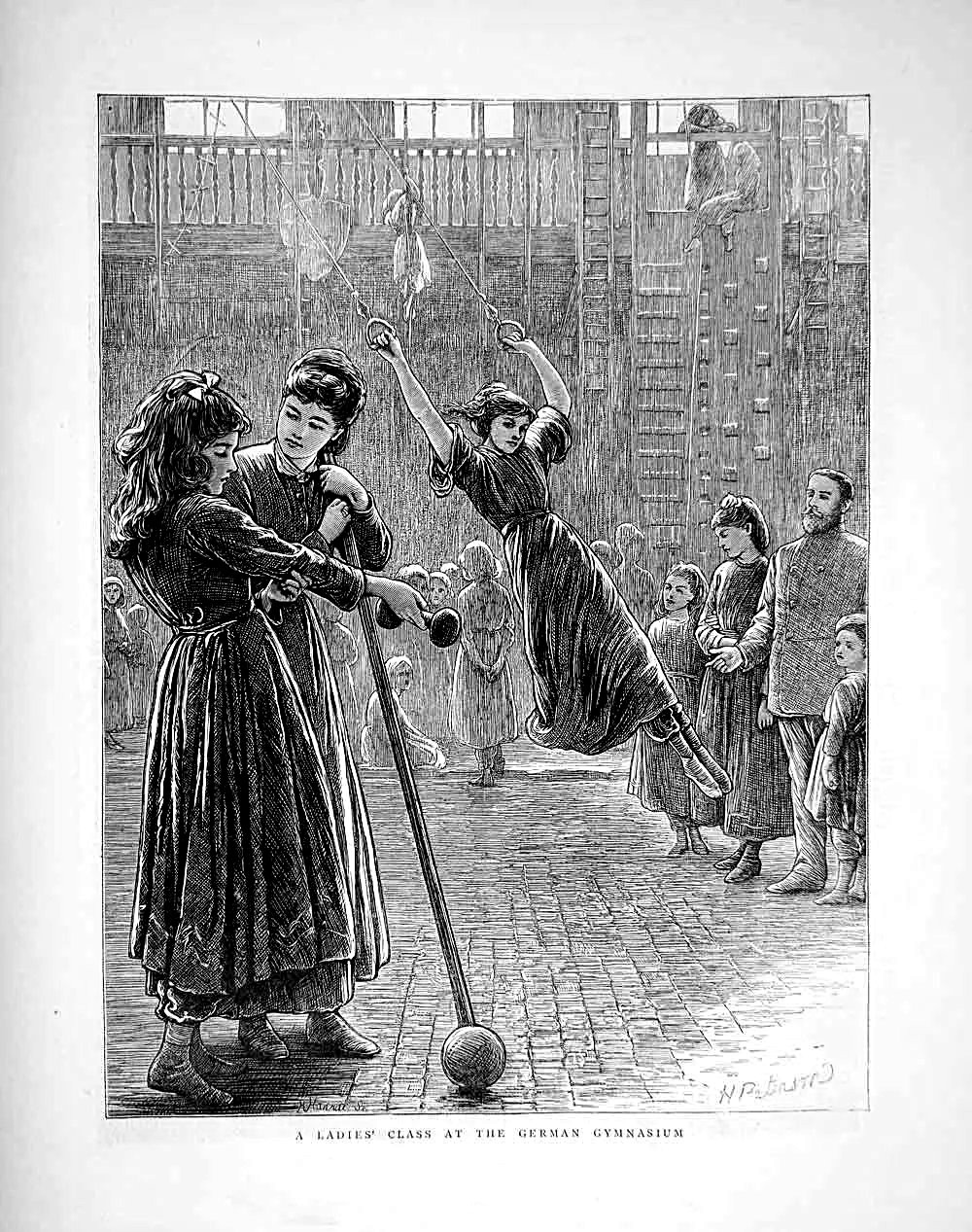
H. W. Patterson. A Ladies' Class at The German Gymnasium. 1872

The gymnasium arose out of the humanistic movement of the sixteenth century. The first general school system to incorporate the gymnasium emerged in Saxony in 1528, with the study of Greek and Latin added to the curriculum later; these languages became the foundation of teaching and study in the gymnasium, which then offered a nine-year course. Hebrew was also taught in some gymnasia. The integration of philosophy, English, and chemistry into the curriculum also set the gymnasium apart from other schools.

Prussian secondary schools only received the title "Gymnasium" in 1918, which, for some time, would be the only path to university study. Due to the rise of German nationalism in the 1900s, the Gymnasium's focus on humanism came under attack, causing it to lose prestige. One of the harshest critics was Friedrich Lange, who assaulted the school's "excessive humanism" and "aesthetic idealism." He argued that they are not aligned with the aims of patriotism, duty, and the idea of Germanhood and that the country's history could also provide the education and insights offered by the models of classical antiquity. During the National Socialism era, it became virtually impossible for girls to study at a Gymnasium according to Hitler's idea, as stated in Mein Kampf, the education of girls should be conditioned only by the task of motherhood.

After the Second World War, German education was reformed with the introduction of a new system, content, aims, and ethos. The Gymnasium was retained, along with vocational and general schools.

=== East Germany ===
In East Germany, the tripartite system was replaced by a system of Polytechnische Oberschule (polytechnic secondary schools) from 6 to 16, followed by Extended Secondary Schools for those on an academic path. Following German reunification, the tripartite system, including Gymnasium schools, was reintroduced in the newly-reunified eastern German states.

== Other methods ==
The Realgymnasium offered instead a nine-year course including Latin, but not Greek. Prussian Progymnasien and Realprogymnasien provided six- or seven-year courses, and the Oberschulen later offered nine-year courses without Greek or Latin.

== Gymnasia for girls ==
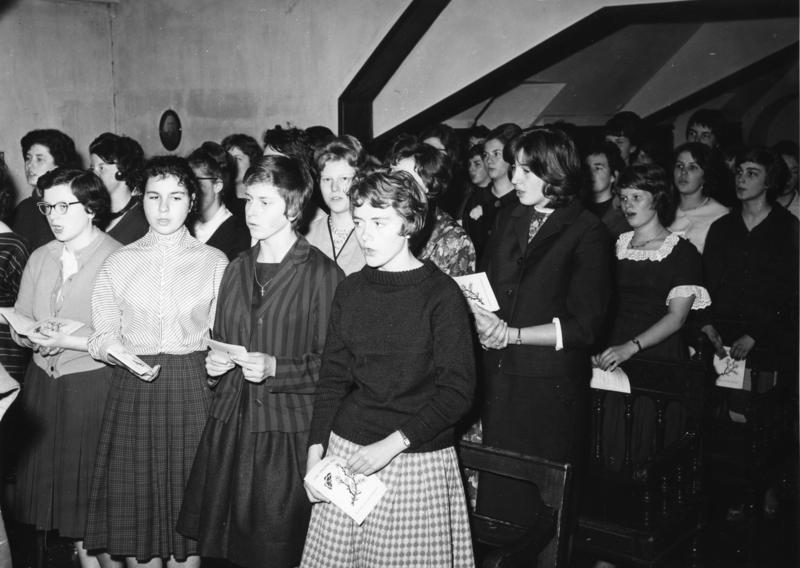
Students of the Gymnasium Nonnenwerth, an all-girls school in 1960

The early twentieth century saw an increase in the number of Lyzeum schools for girls, which offered a six-year course. The rising prominence of girls' gymnasia was mainly due to the ascendancy of the German feminist movement in the nineteenth and twentieth centuries, corresponding to the rising demand for women's university education.

Co-educational gymnasia have become widespread since the 1970s, and today, single-sex gymnasia are rare in Germany.

== Historical names given to yeargroups in the German gymnasium ==
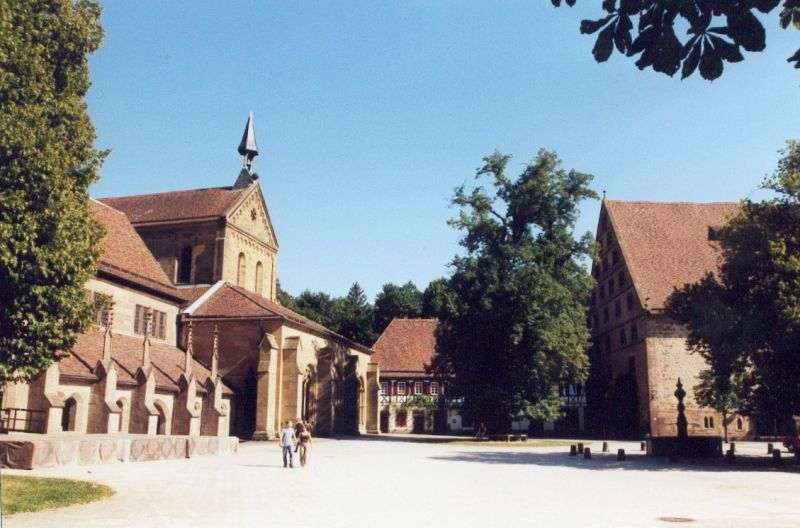
Evangelical Seminaries of Maulbronn and Blaubeuren – church and courtyard

When primary school ended at age 9-10, and pupils left German basic secondary schools (Volksschule/Hauptschule or Realschule) at the end of the school year in which they turned 10 or 11, the gymnasium used special terms for its year groups:

School year (England & Wales)	K–12 system (US/Canada)	Age group	Year in gymnasium
6	Fifth	10–11	Sexta
7	Sixth	11–12	Quinta
8	Seventh	12–13	Quarta
9	Eighth	13–14	Untertertia (lower Tertia)
10	Ninth	14–15	Obertertia (upper Tertia)
11	Tenth	15–16	Untersekunda (lower Secunda)
Lower Sixth	Eleventh	16–17	Obersekunda (upper Secunda)
Upper Sixth	Twelfth	17–18	Unterprima (lower Prima)
N/A	N/A	18–19	Oberprima (upper Prima)

== Modern languages ==
Today, nearly all German gymnasia, just like nearly all German secondary schools, teach English as a compulsory primary foreign language, with French or Latin sometimes posing an alternative. However, English must usually be taken as a compulsory second foreign language in these cases. The German State of Berlin, where secondary education normally begins in the seventh year of schooling, has some specialised gymnasia beginning with the fifth year which teach Latin or French as a primary foreign language. English has been a compulsory subject in gymnasia since 1957. Usually, children have already been taught some English in primary schools, where classes often begin in Year 3.

Many gymnasia offer bilingual classes, in which certain subjects, often history, PE, and geography, are taught in English, or sometimes in French, usually after a year or two of normal classes.

A second foreign language is usually compulsory, and gymnasia typically offer 2 or 3 options. French is the most prevalent choice, followed by Latin, though Spanish has been taking over in recent years. Other options sometimes offered include Russian, which was once more common, Ancient Greek, and Italian. The percentages vary between regions.

It is possible to take an additional third foreign language. In the final years, called Oberstufe, it is usually only possible to take two foreign languages. However, some schools also allow one of these to be a new foreign language.

The way English is taught has changed since the late 19th century, when it was first offered as an optional subject, usually after Latin, Ancient Greek, and French, and at the same level as Hebrew. At first, English was taught similarly to Latin, i.e., by translating texts word-for-word. Over time, this has changed a lot, with lessons usually being conducted entirely or almost entirely in English, for example. Methods are still changing, e.g., a stronger focus on the diversity of the language and the cultures it is intertwined with, instead of just an Anglo-American focus.

== Languages of instruction ==
Although some specialist gymnasia have English or French as the language of instruction, most lessons in a typical gymnasium (apart from foreign language courses) are conducted in Standard High German. This is true even in regions where High German is not the prevailing dialect.

== Subjects taught ==
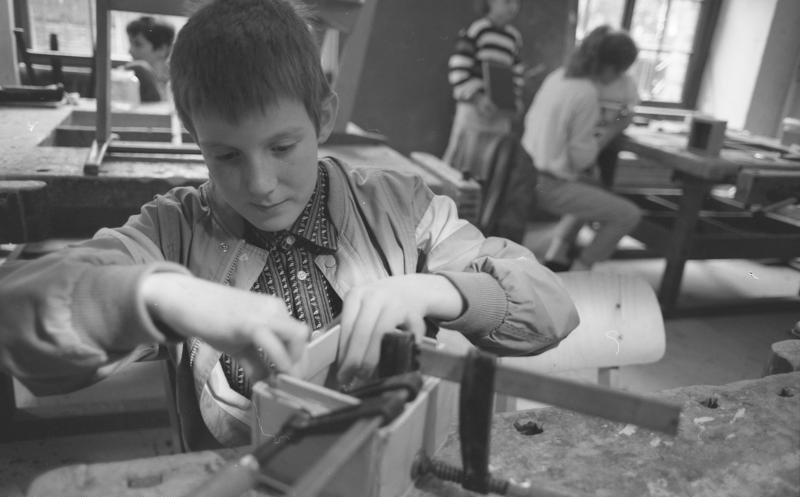
Gymnasium student in crafts class, Bonn, 1988

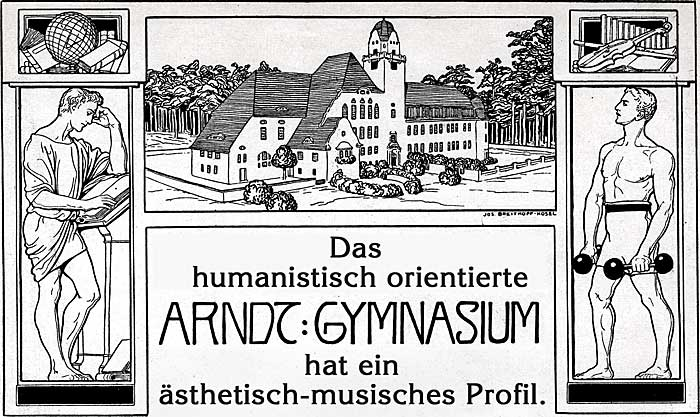
This vignette of the Arndt-Gymnasium Dahlem shows a young man studying at the left and a young man doing sports at the right; it was printed on the 2008 school programme.

Curricula differ from school to school, but generally include German, mathematics, informatics/computer science, physics, chemistry, biology, geography, art (as well as crafts and design), music, history, philosophy, civics / citizenship, social sciences, and several foreign languages.

For younger students, nearly the entire gymnasium curriculum is compulsory; in upper years, more elective subjects are available, but the choice is not as wide as in a U.S. high school. Generally, academic standards are high as the gymnasium typically caters to the upper 25–35% of the ability range.

Schools focus not only on academic subjects but also on producing well-rounded individuals, so physical education and religion or ethics are compulsory, even in non-denominational schools, which are prevalent. The German constitution guarantees the separation of church and state, so although religion or ethics classes are compulsory, students may choose to study a specific religion or none at all.

== Schools for the gifted ==
Gymnasien are often conceived as schools for the gifted. This, however, depends on many factors; some states, such as Bavaria, select their students by elementary grades or by entrance examination, and so do certain specialist schools, like the Sächsisches Landesgymnasium Sankt Afra zu Meißen, in other states. In these federal states, it is not up to the parents to decide whether a pupil will attend the Gymnasium; the decision is mainly based on performance in elementary school. However, even "the gifted" in this sense comprise a fourth or fifth of the population. Other gymnasia in other states have no such strict provisions. Though gymnasia traditionally impose strict grading that causes students of average academic ability to struggle, many schools share the motto: "No child left behind" ("Keiner darf verloren gehen").

== Common types of gymnasium ==
=== Humanistisches Gymnasium (humanities-oriented) ===
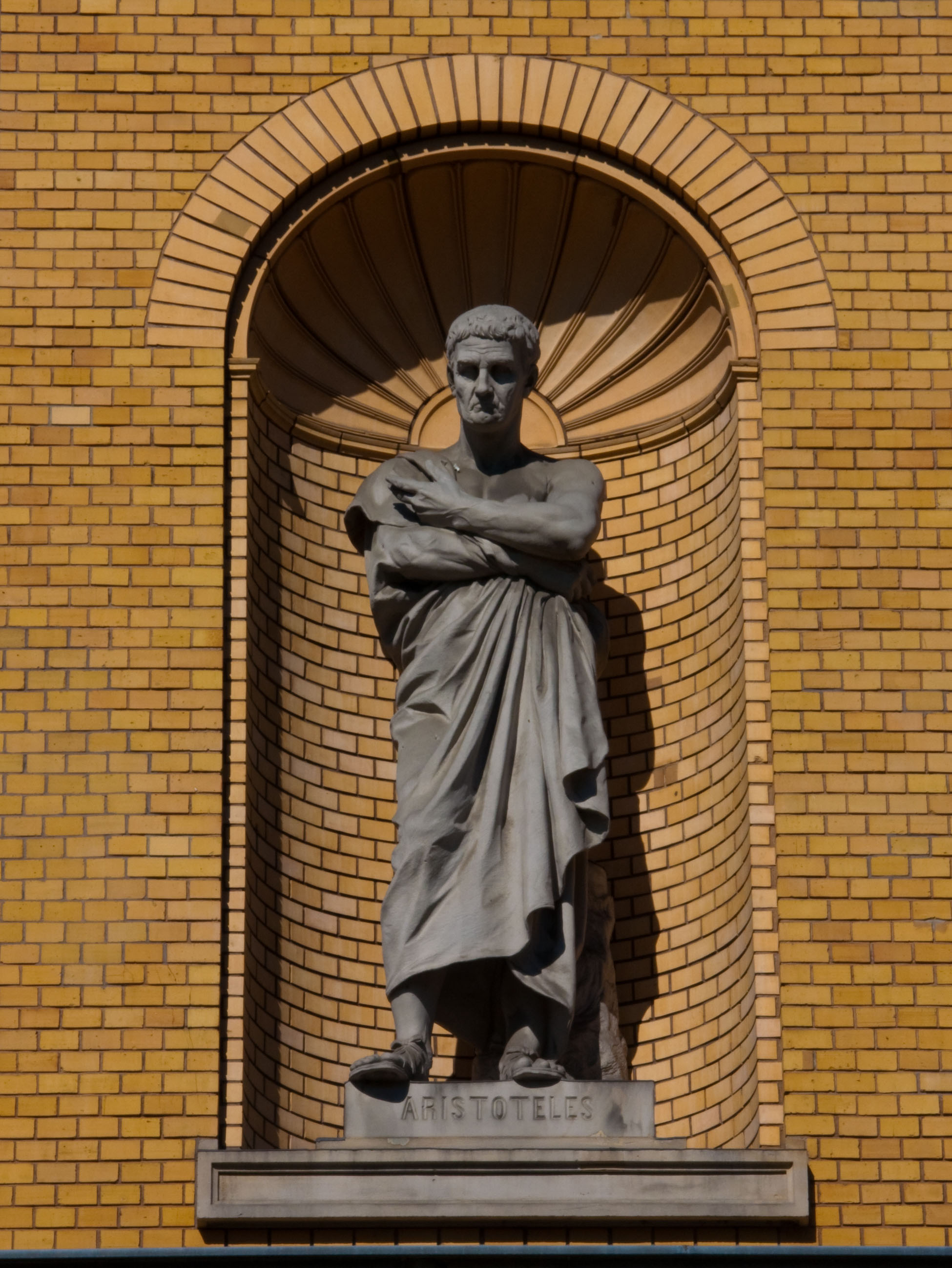
Representation of Aristotle at the Joachimsthalsches Gymnasium, a humanities-oriented gymnasium

Humanities-oriented gymnasia usually have a long tradition. They teach Latin and Ancient Greek (sometimes also Classical Hebrew) and additionally teach English, French, or both. The focus is on the classical antiquity and the civilizations of ancient Greece and ancient Rome.

For certain subjects, such as History, many universities still require the Latinum, some also the Graecum, proof of study or comprehension of Latin or Ancient Greek, respectively.

=== Neusprachliches Gymnasium (focus on modern languages) ===
This type of school is less traditional. It teaches at least two modern languages. In most cases, the students have the chance to learn Latin as well.

=== Mathematisch-Naturwissenschaftliches Gymnasium (focus on math and science) ===
Often combined with the Neusprachliches Gymnasium, these schools focus on STEM subjects.

=== Previous names ===
The Gymnasium with a focus on mathematics and sciences used to be called Oberrealschule, and the Gymnasium with a focus on both modern languages and mathematics and sciences used to be called Realgymnasium. The Gymnasium was supposed to be the humanities-oriented variety; during the Nazi era, a common term for all of these schools put together was Oberschule (literally, "upper school"). In the 1960s, school reformers, as part of an equalization effort, discontinued these names. The most practical benefit of this was that it prevented the frequent confusion among parents about the fundamental difference between Realgymnasium, Oberrealschule and Oberschule on the one side and Realschule on the other.

== Special types of gymnasium ==
=== The Sportgymnasium and the Skigymnasium ===
The Sportgymnasium is a gymnasium-type school, usually a boarding school, with a main focus on sport. The Skigymnasium has a focus on skiing.

=== Musikgymnasium ===
The Musikgymnasium has its focus on music. In Bavaria, it requires learning to play an instrument (mostly the piano or the violin) as one of their major subjects.

=== Europäisches Gymnasium ===
The Europäisches Gymnasium focuses on languages. It exists in Bavaria and Baden-Württemberg. In Bavaria, students are required to learn three different foreign languages. They start learning their first foreign language in 5th year of education, the second in 6th, and the third by the 10th or 11th. In Baden-Württemberg, students attending the Europäisches Gymnasium begin learning Latin and English in 5th grade. They pick up their third language by 7th or 8th year and their fourth foreign language by 10th year. By the 10th year, students also choose whether to drop one of the languages they started in 5th year. Later, they may drop another language. Students are required to take at least two foreign languages, and fluency is a requirement for graduation. If they wish, students may also graduate with four foreign languages.

== Gymnasium for mature students ==
There are several gymnasia for mature students who graduated from school but did not receive an Abitur. Most of these schools have only the top three or four year groups, rather than the traditional 5th to 13th years. Examples are the Abendgymnasium, the Aufbaugymnasium and the Wirtschaftsgymnasium.

== Culture of Teaching and Testing ==
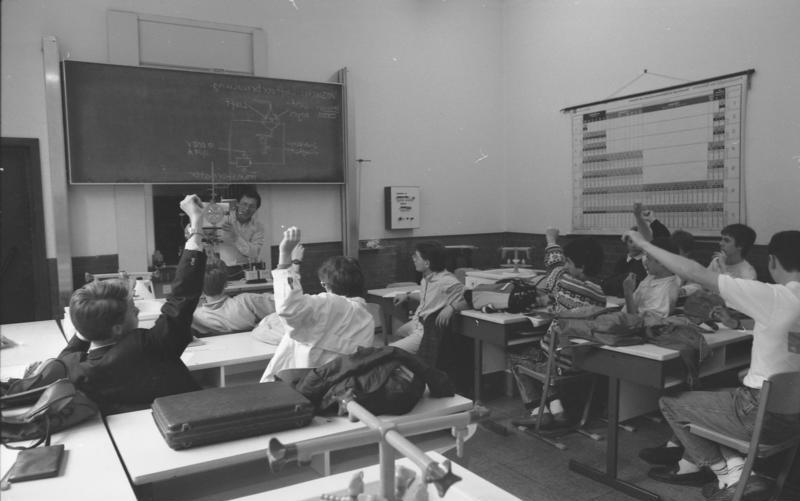
Students raising their hands to indicate they know the answer, Bonn, 1988

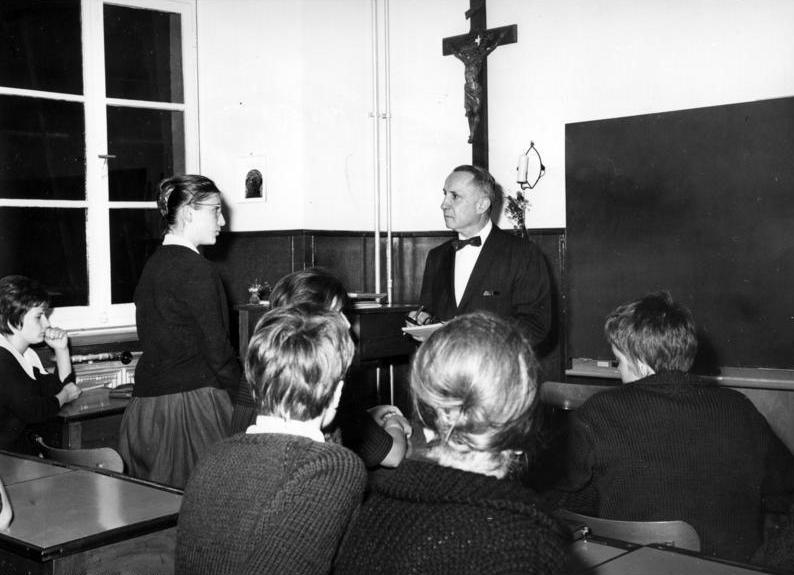
This 1961 picture shows a student standing up, to answer the teacher's question. On the wall is a Christian crucifix, commonly found in a gymnasium classroom but now less common. In 1995, a court ruled it violates the rights of non-Christian students and must be removed if any student objects.

German gymnasia follow different pedagogical philosophies, and teaching methods may vary. In traditional schools, students stand when the teacher enters the classroom. The teacher says, "Good morning, class," and the class answers, "Good morning, Mr./Ms. ..." The teacher then asks them to sit down.

Until the 1960s, students were supposed to address their teachers by the appropriate title, e.g., "Herr Studienrat." This is generally outdated. The headteacher might also be addressed more laxly as Herr Direktor (the correct title being Herr Oberstudiendirektor). The general mode of address is these days Mr. + surname. Teachers mostly address students by their first name.

Corporal punishment was banned in 1973. Teachers who want to punish students put them in detention or assign them boring tasks. Some have them write essays like "Why a student should not interrupt their teachers." Students may also be subjected to official disciplinary measures, such as a Verweis (reprimand), not unlike those used to discipline civil servants or soldiers; the harshest of these measures is expulsion from school. Such pupils have to go to another school, or even be banned from attending state schools altogether. This is rare, though. Some private schools are more lenient with expulsions, along with the line that the pupil in question does not fit into the community and should thus try his fortune with a school officially designated to take all pupils, i.e., a state school.

There are written and oral exams. Written exams are essay-based and called Klausur and typically take 1.5 hours. Many German students never take a multiple-choice test.

== Gymnasium and academic grading ==
A gymnasium is a school where most students are college-bound, and stringent grading is the norm. Pupils of average ability find themselves at the bottom of their class and might have done better at another type of school.

A study revealed that upper-class gymnasium students of average mathematical ability found themselves at the very bottom of their class, with an average grade of "5" (fail). Comprehensive school upper-class students of average ability in mathematics found themselves in the upper half of their class and had an average grade of "3+".

Students who graduated from a gymnasium often do better in college than their grades or class ranking would predict.

== A "gymnasium in the south" ==
To many traditionally minded Germans, a "gymnasium in the south" is the epitome of a good education, while to other Germans, it is the epitome of outmoded traditions and elitism.

A study revealed that gymnasia in the south did have higher standards than those in other parts of Germany. On a standardised mathematics test provided by scientists, the study showed that students attending a southern gymnasium outperformed those attending one elsewhere in Germany.

A 2007 study revealed that those attending a gymnasium in the north had similar IQs to those attending one in the south. Yet those attending a gymnasium in the north underperformed on standardised tests. The students who did worst came from Hamburg, and the students who did best came from Baden-Württemberg. According to the study, final-year students in Hamburg lagged two years behind those attending a gymnasium in Baden-Württemberg. Because students had the same IQ, the difference in knowledge could only be explained by differences in teaching methods. On the other hand, gymnasia in the south have the reputation of valuing knowledge over creativity. In contrast, those in the north are known for valuing creativity over knowledge. Comparing students on a creativity test could produce different results.

== Athletics ==
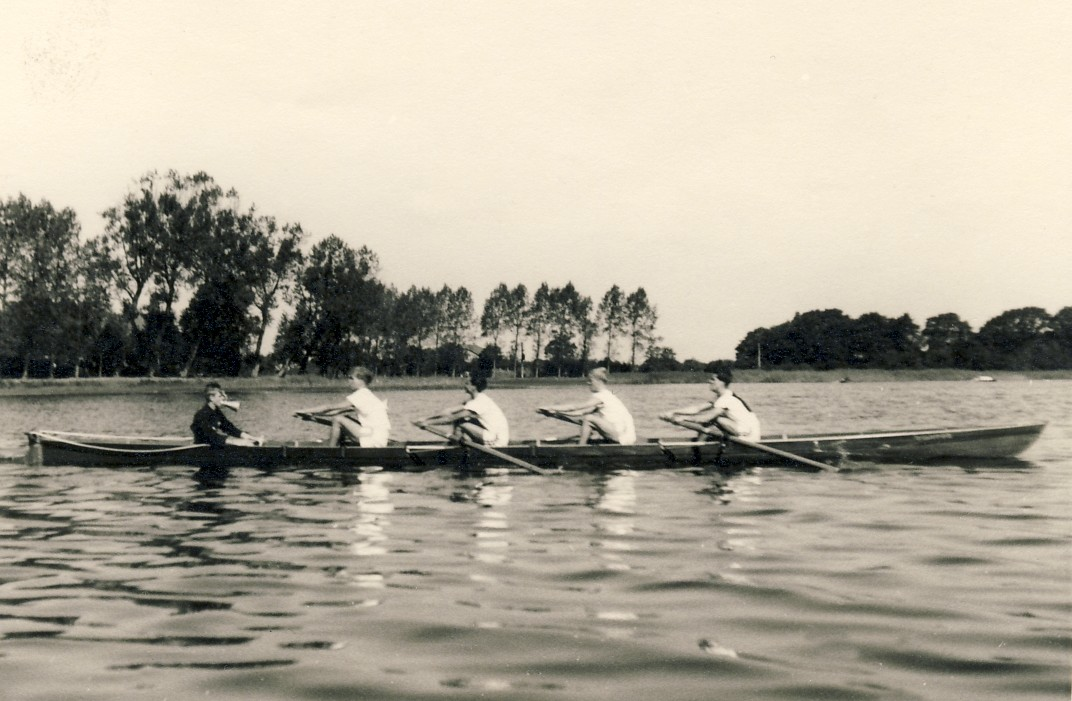
Rowing has a long tradition for many German Gymnasia: Students participating in a Regatta in Neumünster, 1959.

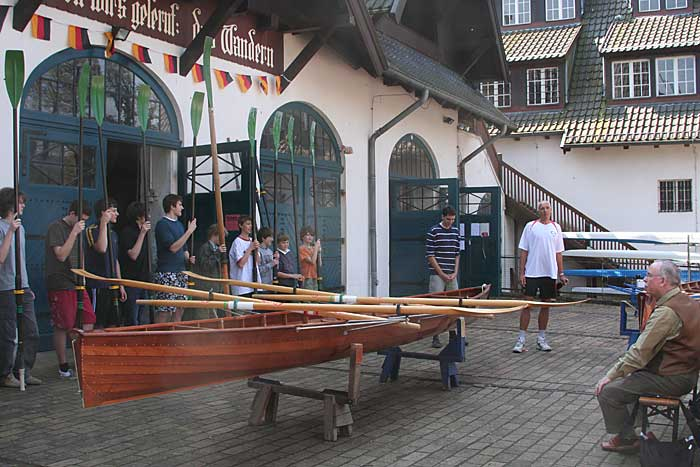
Students of the Arndt-Gymnasium, standing in front of their "rowing house", baptising their new boat in 2007

Students from all years are required to take physical education classes. Most gymnasia have sports teams. Sports often include soccer, badminton, table tennis, rowing and field hockey.

Most gymnasia offer students the opportunity to participate in sport-related outings. In the summer months, they have the opportunity to enjoy rowing trips or sailing, and in the winter months, they may go skiing. Students are not required to participate, but teachers see the trips as good for building character and leadership skills and encourage students to participate. As a rule, most of these trips come with fees. A school "Förderverein" (booster club) pays for those who wish to attend but are unable to afford the fee.

== Social clubs ==
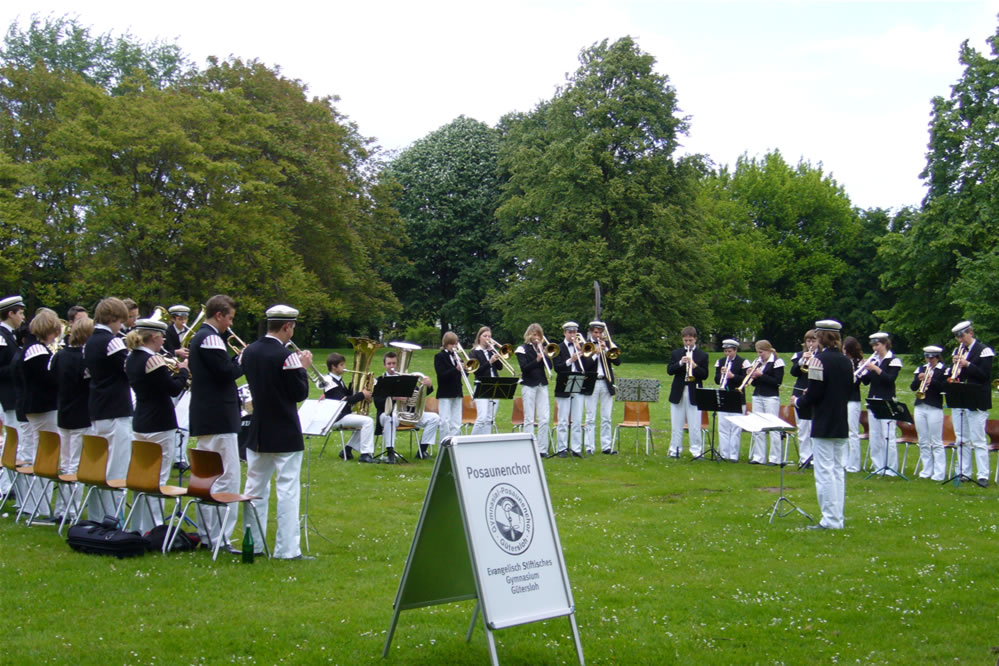
Brass band of the gymnasium in Gütersloh, 2006. The students are wearing traditional uniforms and caps.

Most gymnasia offer social and academic clubs. Most traditional among these (sports excepted) are drama, journalism (i. e. producing a Schülerzeitung) and choir. However, chess, photography, debating, improv, environmentalism, additional math, experimental physics, IT classes, etc. can also be found.

Some gymnasia require students to participate in at least one club (of the student's choosing), but in most cases, participation is voluntary.

== Exchange visits ==
It has become increasingly common for gymnasium students to spend some time studying abroad. Very popular destinations are English-speaking countries such as the US, Great Britain, Canada, and Ireland; however, as it is increasingly difficult to find partner schools in English-speaking countries (high demand, little supply, among other things, because of the limited importance of German lessons), even countries whose language is not taught at all are visited. While this is not required, it is encouraged. Some pupils might go abroad for a year or half a year (and are granted time to catch up on their studies at home). At the same time, the more general option is an organized stay of 2–4 weeks in either country, in a group of 20+ students with two teachers (who are naturally dispensed from everyday duties during the stay).

== Dress code ==
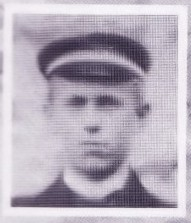
Gymnasium students wearing traditional caps in 1904. Wearing them was seen not as a liability, but a privilege.

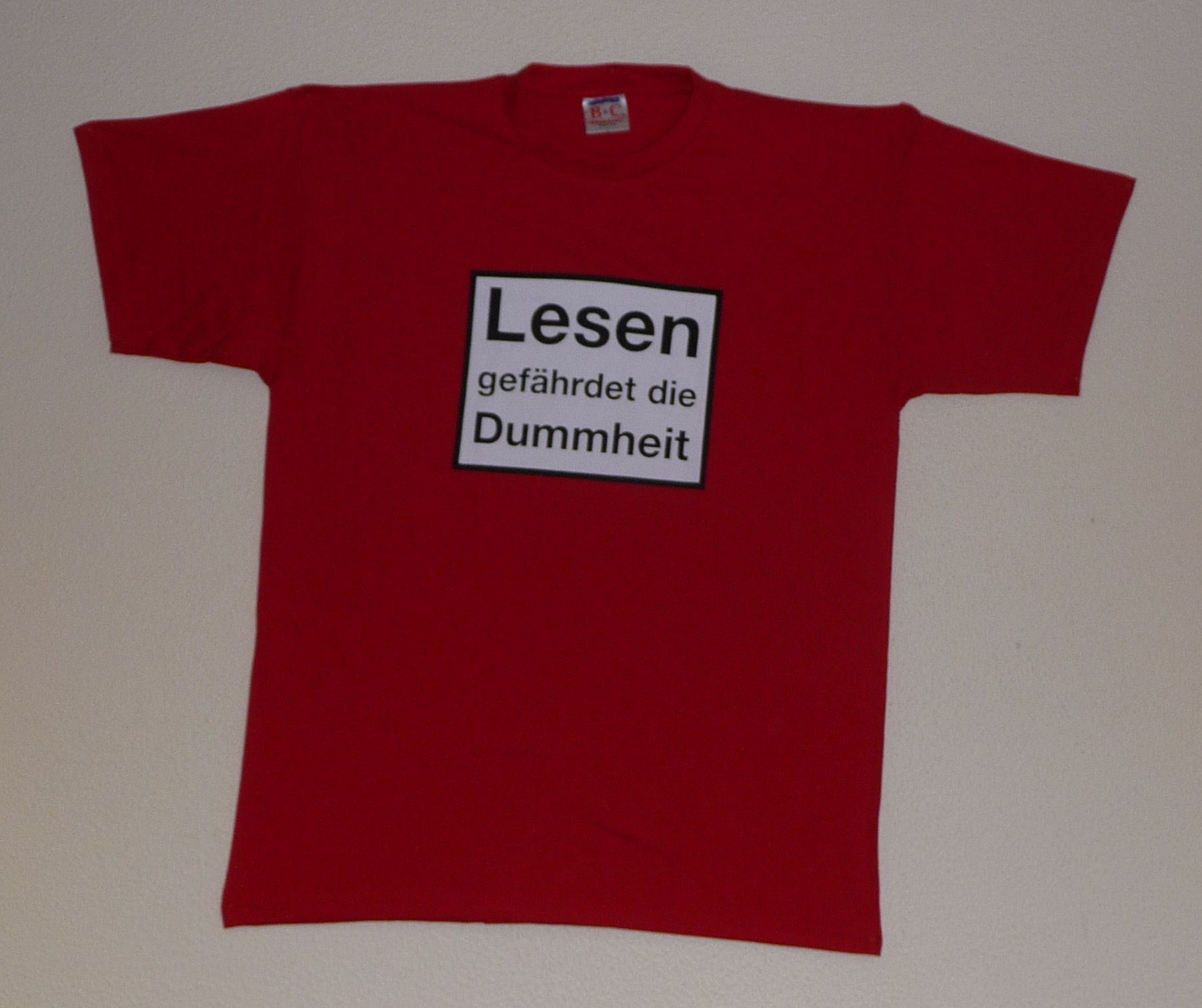
Students at the Heinrich-Böll-Gymnasium (Ludwigshafen) can wear a T-shirt that says "Reading endangers stupidity" (it resembles the German warning label on cigarettes).

Generally, gymnasia have no school uniforms or official dress codes. However, students may be expected to dress modestly and tastefully. Some gymnasia offer branded shirts, but students may choose whether to wear them. For specific school events (like the Abitur ball), students attending them may be expected to wear formal dress, usually consisting of dresses for women and a blazer and tie for men. Still, even this is no longer the case for every gymnasium.

In the past, Gymnasiasten wore a traditional cap, identifying them as gymnasium students. The colour of the cap differed by gymnasium and grade. In case of the Ludwig Meyn Gymnasium in Uetersen, for example, in 1920:

- Untertertia-students wore a green cap with a blue, red, and white cord
- Obertertia-students wore a green cap, with a black-and-white cord
- Untersekunda-students wore a violet cap with a blue, white, and red cord
- Obersekunda-students wore a violet cap with a black-and-white cord
- Unterprima-students wore a red cap with a blue, white, and red cord
- Oberprima-students wore a red cap with a black and white cord

After the Machtergreifung of the Nazis, the gymnasium cap was banned for political reasons. Literature describing student caps was burned. Students received new clothing from the League of German Girls and the Hitler Youth. Students at the gymnasium were forbidden to wear clothing that identified them as members of their school. Now, it is no longer illegal, and these caps are again being sold; however, few ever wear one.

At some schools, upon graduating, students receive an Abitur T-shirt printed with the school name, the year of graduation, and a slogan.

== Mentoring ==
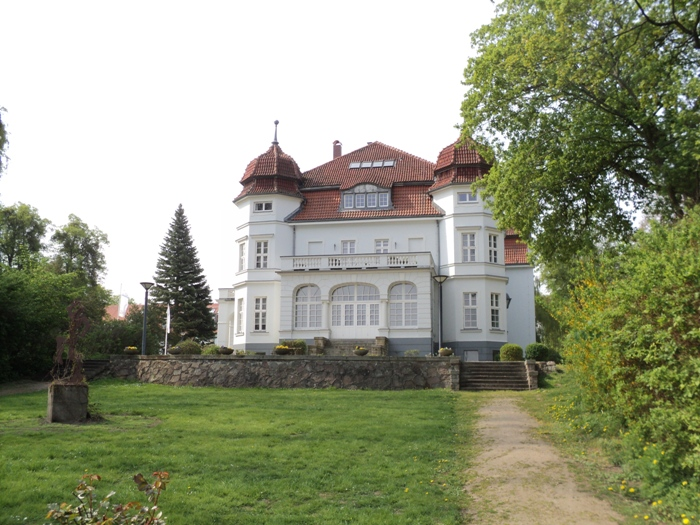
Internat Schloss Torgelow, a renowned private Gymnasium boarding school in Mecklenburg, that leads to prestigious Abitur exams

As the new crop of students arrives at the gymnasium, there is often a period of adjustment. Some gymnasia have mentors who help new, younger students settle in. They show them around the school and introduce them to older students. In the case of boarding schools, they also show them the city. Mentoring does not mean a student is seen as "at risk." On the contrary, if there is a mentoring programme, all new students are likely to have a mentor.

Some schools have mentors (mostly alums or parents) who help graduates choose a college and arrange practical training.

In 2008, a mentoring programme called "Arbeiterkind" ("working-class child") was founded to support students from working-class families in their transition. A year later, this organization had 1000 mentors and 70 local chapters.

== Booster clubs ==
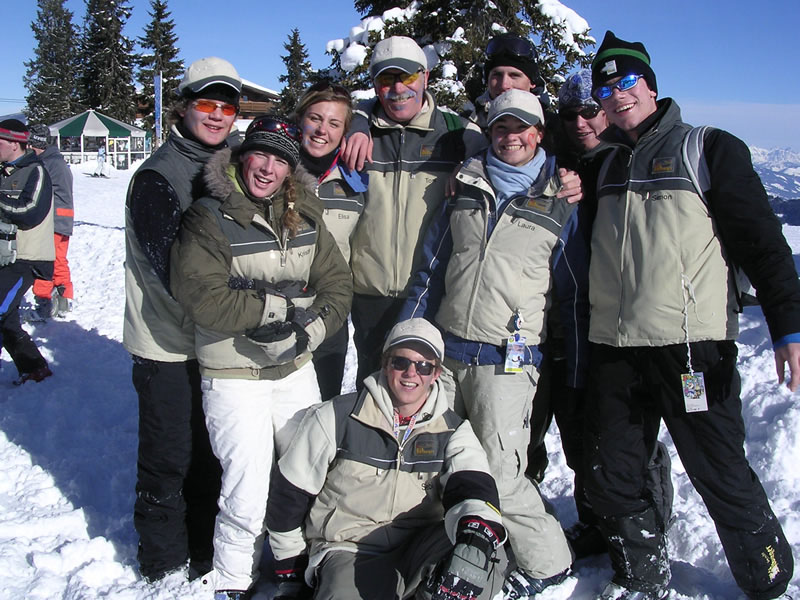
Gymnasiasten on a skiing-trip. In many cases, the booster club covers the costs of poorer students.

The Schulverein or Förderverein is an organization formed to support the school financially. Members may be parents and alumni, or philanthropists. They pay for books for the school library and offer a hand to students from less affluent families, allowing them to participate in field trips and school outings.

== Teacher education ==
In general, to obtain a teaching degree for Gymnasia, prospective teachers must study at least two subjects in the gymnasia's curriculum. Some decide to study three or more subjects. In addition, the university programmes for teachers always include lectures on educational sciences and didactics. After 9 semesters (4.5 years) or more, students must pass the Erstes Staatsexamen, a state-level exam roughly equivalent to a master's degree, which marks the end of their academic training. However, having passed this test does not qualify someone to become a gymnasium teacher. This education is followed by the Referendariat (on-the-job training), which normally lasts 18–24 months. During this time, the student teacher gains practical teaching experience under the supervision of experienced colleagues. This phase is completed by the "Zweites Staatsexamen," which assesses the trainees' practical teaching ability. Those who have completed both the first and second state examinations may then apply for a position at a Gymnasium or a lesser school.

However, the systems of teacher education differ among the Bundesländer, include exceptions, and are often modified. One trend is the abolishing of the first state examination in favour of Master of Education programmes. The second state examination is not affected by this development.

== Admission to a gymnasium ==
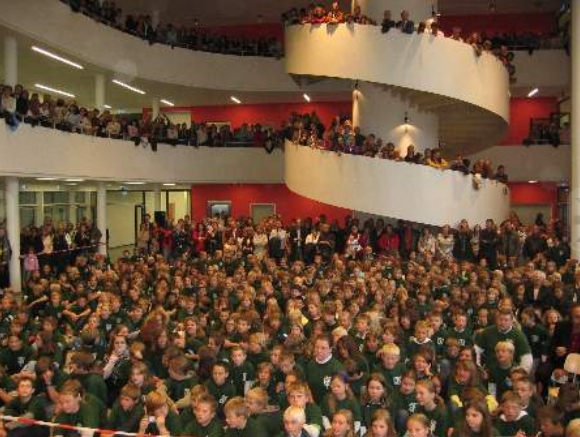
The first class of students admitted at the Gymnasium Kirchseeon (founded in 2008) gather in the assembly hall to celebrate their first day of school.

Admission procedures vary by state and gymnasium. Most gymnasia do not have written entrance exams. In some cases, students need a certain grade point average to apply to a gymnasium. In most cases, students applying to a gymnasium typically need a letter of recommendation from their primary school teacher. The letter covers the child's academic performance, classroom behaviour, personal attributes, leadership abilities, and extracurricular activities.

Based on that letter, the gymnasium determines the applicant's suitability for the school. Some gymnasia hold informal interviews during which they present their school to the applicant and, in turn, learn about him as the school representative works with the applicant and his parents to determine whether the gymnasium is a good fit for the child.

The state of Berlin allows its gymnasia to select 65% to 70% of their students, with the rest selected by lottery. Any qualified child can enter the lottery, regardless of previous school performance (see: Education in Berlin).

Some gymnasia are inundated with applications, and some children have to resort to second- or third-choice schools.

== Tuition ==
State-funded schools (a large majority) are tuition-free, as foreseen by the respective laws, often at the constitutional level. Segregation of students by parental wealth or income is looked down upon, to the point of being an exception to the constitutionally guaranteed freedom to establish private schools (Article 7, Section 4 of the German Constitution, Sondierungsverbot). Of the private gymnasia, the vast majority are run by the Catholic Church on very low tuition fees (which is easier, as by Concordat, the Church receives a high percentage of the amount of money the State does not spend for a pupil in a Church-school); fees for schools that need to earn money by teaching are higher. Schools with fees generally offer scholarships.

In 2005, the German government spent €5,400 per student attending a public gymnasium. This is less than what was spent on a student attending Hauptschule, but more than was spent on those attending Realschule. Some Hauptschule and Gesamtschule students have special needs that require extra help, so those schools cannot operate as cost-effectively as gymnasia.

== On cultural and ethnic diversity ==
While one third of all German youngsters have at least one foreign-born parent and other German schools are becoming more multicultural, but gymnasia have remained, for the most part, socially and ethnically exclusive. While children belonging to Russian-Jewish, Chinese, Greek, Korean, or Vietnamese minorities are more likely to attend a gymnasium than ethnic Germans, most minorities are less likely to attend a gymnasium than ethnic Germans. A study done in Baden-Württemberg revealed that 85.9% of students attending a gymnasium were ethnic Germans. Thus, the gymnasium is the German school with the most homogenous student body. According to Der Spiegel magazine, some minority students were denied a letter of recommendation for entrance to a gymnasium by their teachers simply because they were immigrants. According to Der Spiegel, teachers think minority students would not feel at home at a school with such a homogenous student body.

== "Great equaliser" or "breeding ground of privilege"? ==
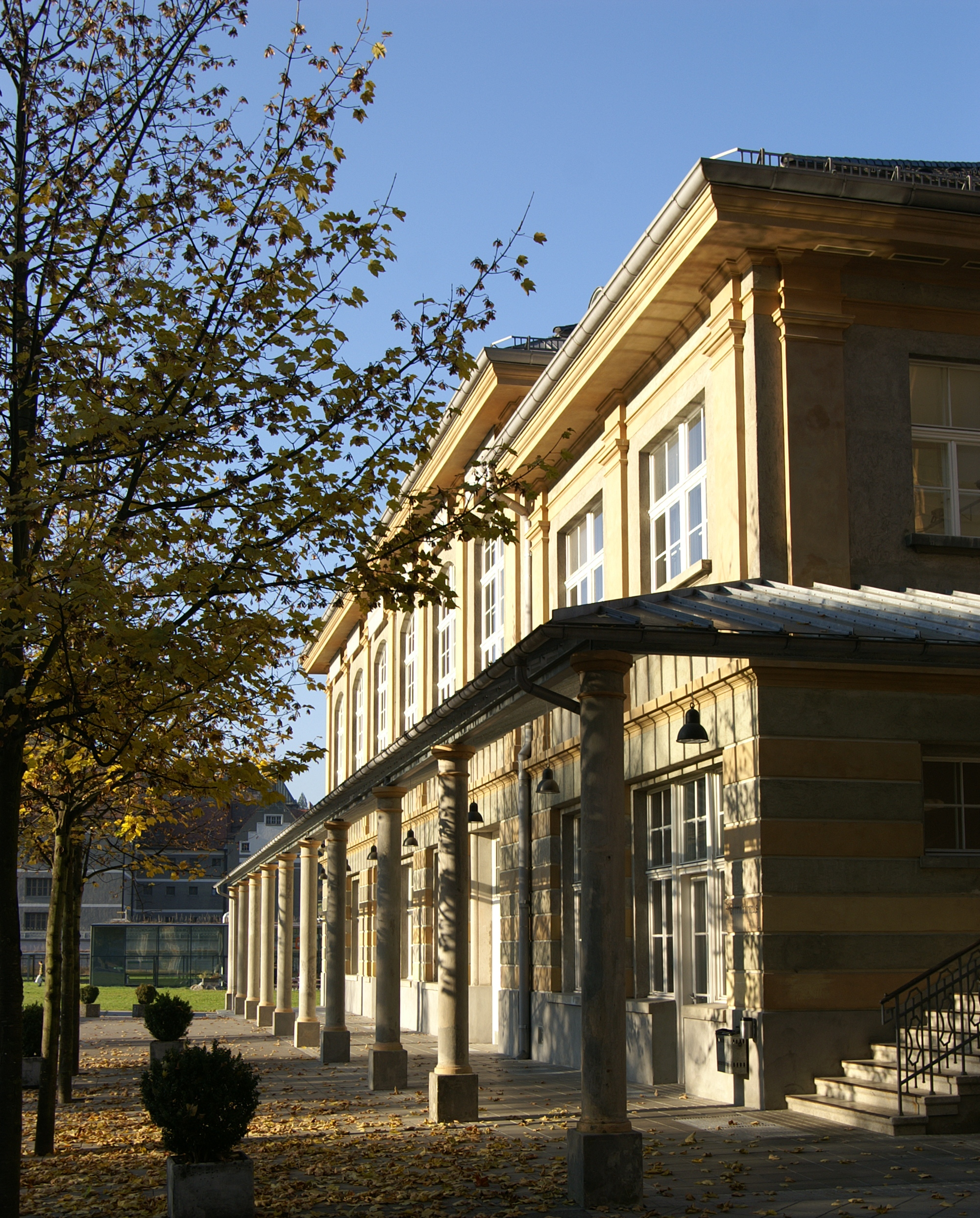
Stella Matutina in Feldkirch

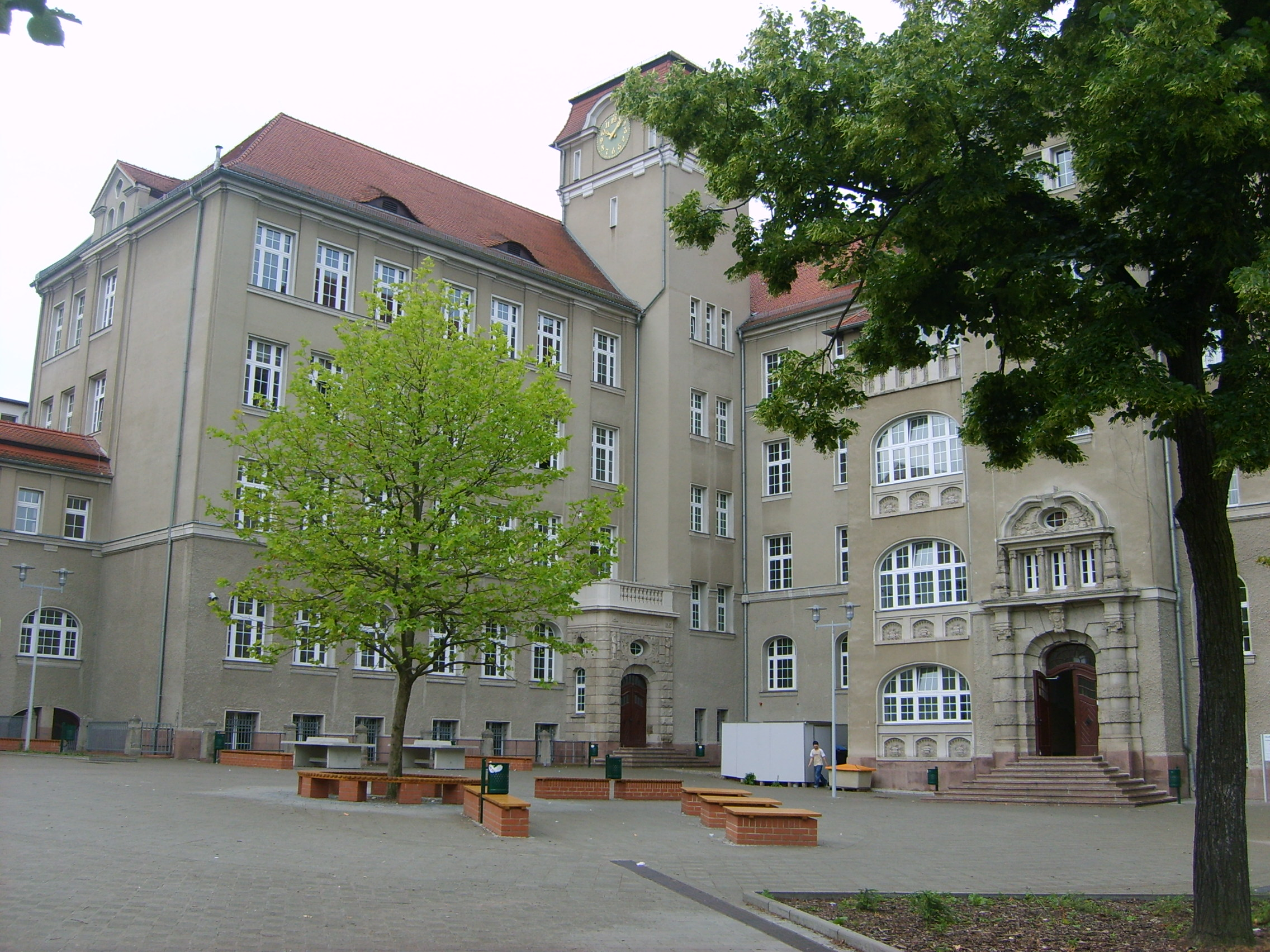
The Georg-Cantor-Gymnasium is an all-day school founded in 1989.

A study revealed that 50% of the students attending a gymnasium come from families of the top levels of German society. Some people have voiced concerns that gymnasia are designed to accommodate a minority of privileged children--talented working-class children are impeded in gaining access to gymnasium. There have been calls for the abolition of the gymnasium and a switch-over to comprehensive schools. Others want gymnasia to target more children from poor backgrounds.

Some believe that gymnasia are "the great equaliser" and have pointed out that state-funded and parochial gymnasia have helped many students rise above humble backgrounds. Some also point out that gymnasia are the only schools where working-class students nearly catch up with their middle-class peers, whereas in comprehensive schools, the effects of social class on student academic performance are more pronounced than in any other type of school.

=== Progress in International Reading Literacy Study ===
The Progress in International Reading Literacy Study revealed that working-class children needed to achieve higher reading scores than middle-class children to obtain letters of recommendation for entrance into the gymnasium. After testing their reading abilities, the odds of upper-middle-class children being nominated to a gymnasium were 2.63 times higher than for working-class children.

Points needed to be nominated for gymnasium
	Teachers nominating child for gymnasium	Parents wanting child to attend a gymnasium
Children from upper-middle-class backgrounds	537	498
Children from lower-middle-class backgrounds	569	559
Children of parents holding pink-collar jobs	582	578
Children of self-employed parents	580	556
Children from upper-working-class backgrounds	592	583
Children from lower-working-class backgrounds	614	606

According to the Progress in International Reading Literacy Study, students from ethnic German families were 4.96 times more likely than children from immigrant families to have their teacher write a letter of recommendation. Even when comparing children with the same reading scores, ethnic Germans were still 2.11 times as likely to receive the letter.

=== PISA study ===
According to the PISA study, competency was linked to social class. After allowing for cognitive competency, middle-class children were still attending gymnasium at three times the rate of working-class children. After accounting for reading and cognitive competencies, children from the highest social class still attended gymnasium at 4 to 6 times the rate of working-class children. According to the study, immigrant children were not discriminated against. The reason so few immigrant children attended a gymnasium was poor reading skills. After allowing for reading competency, children from immigrant families were as likely as children from native German families to attend a gymnasium.

=== ELEMENT-study ===
The German scientist Lehmann conducted a longitudinal study of pupils' performance in Berlin on standardised tests. Such pupils used to be admitted to a gymnasium after the fourth and sixth grades, respectively. Pupils in German schools do not undergo standardised testing; instead, they write essays. However, Lehmann wanted to know if those test results would predict the likelihood of admission to a gymnasium after the sixth grade and if admission to a gymnasium after the fourth grade would boost their performance in standardised tests.

Lehmann's findings were as follows:

- Performance in standardised tests was a key indicator of admission to a gymnasium; after evaluating the performance in those tests, it was clear that social class did not play a major role in determining whether or not a pupil would be admitted to a gymnasium.
- Working-class children were not discriminated against; in fact, there seemed to be some evidence that, after evaluating performances in standardised tests, gymnasium admission after the sixth grade seemed to be slightly biased against middle-class children and favoured working-class children as well as those from the higher social classes.
- After evaluating the test scores, it was shown that girls were somewhat more likely to be admitted to the gymnasium than boys.
- Very few pupils who did poorly in standardised tests in the fourth grade were admitted to a gymnasium. However, those who were, were able to improve their performance in those tests in subsequent years.
- Even after testing performance in grade four, those who were admitted to gymnasium outperformed their peers who were not at grade six

=== Study by the University of Mainz ===
A study by the University of Mainz revealed that among children living in the city of Wiesbaden, 81% of those from the upper social classes and only 14% of those from the working class received a letter of recommendation from their teachers. It also showed that only 76% of working-class children whose grades placed them at the top of the class, as well as 91% of children from the upper social classes, in the same situation received a recommendation.

=== The big-fish-little-pond effect ===
According to scientists Joachim Tiedemann and Elfriede Billmann-Mahecha, there was a big-fish-little-pond effect. Children were more likely to have their teacher write a letter of recommendation if the remainder of their primary school class was not too bright. They stated,

A high share of students with above-average academic achievement, cognitive abilities, and achievement-oriented parents actually decreases students’ chances of getting into higher educational tracks (Realschule and gymnasium instead of Hauptschule).

=== Are children with immigration backgrounds discriminated against? ===
According to the same study, they are not. The researchers stated,

After controlling for individual students' competencies, e.g., their cognitive abilities, the common assumption that children with immigration backgrounds are disadvantaged could not be confirmed. Even a high proportion of children in a class who do not speak German as a family language does not lead to adverse recommendations.

=== Do gymnasia help working-class students catch up with their middle-class peers? ===
In 2003, a study found that lower- and working-class children attending a comprehensive school lagged behind their less disadvantaged peers in mathematical ability. The same study revealed that working-class and lower-class children attending a gymnasium nearly caught up to their peers attending the same school. However, special care must be taken when interpreting the data, since lower- and working-class children admitted to gymnasium may differ from other pupils in their class ab initio.

=== Does gymnasium matter after all? ===
The LifE study done by Helmut Fend and others revealed that gymnasium may not matter as much as is generally perceived. According to the study, parents' social class, not schooling, determined children's life trajectories. The study revealed that upper-middle-class children graduating from gymnasiums (and from comprehensive schools) later graduated from college and followed their parents' footsteps into higher professional jobs. It also revealed that for every working-class child who graduated from college, 12 upper-middle-class children did.

== Performance of Gymnasiasten on various tests ==
=== Gymnasium and IQ ===
Only a few specialised gymnasia admit students based on IQ tests. A 1999 study found that 10th year students attending a normal gymnasium and those attending a Realschule had higher IQs than those attending a comprehensive school. It also revealed that the difference was greater in 10th year than in 7th year. The media reacted to the charge that comprehensive schools are "the place where intelligence atrophies." The Max Planck Institute for Human Development stated that nobody was "dumbed down" at the comprehensive school and that those attending a comprehensive in 10th year did no worse on IQ tests than in 7th year. The institute also stated that the IQ difference between comprehensives on the one hand and gymnasia and Realschulen on the other was greater by 10th year than in 7th year because the mean IQ of those at gymnasium and Realschule had risen. The institute, however, did not believe that attending a Realschule or a gymnasium boosts students' IQ. Instead, they stated that students with lower IQs who attend gymnasium or Realschule might find themselves increasingly unable to keep up and thus may drop out by 10th year.

=== Gymnasium and performance on standardised tests ===
As mentioned before, gymnasia and Gesamtschulen in Germany do not administer standardised tests to their students, and few students are familiar with them. Yet, scientists sometimes use standardised tests to evaluate schools. 10th graders attending a gymnasium have been shown to outperform those attending a comprehensive school by 1 standard deviation on a standardised mathematics test. That equals 2 to 3 years of schooling. Proponents of comprehensive schools have criticised such studies, stating they believe standardised tests to be biased against those attending comprehensive schools. They have said that comprehensives taught their students "Independence, capacity for teamwork, creativity, conflict management, and broad-mindedness", and that standardised tests cannot measure those qualities.

=== Gymnasium and selflessness ===
According to a disputed study evaluating students' character based on a standardised test, those attending a Realschule or gymnasium were more likely to be respectful and considerate of others' feelings than those attending a comprehensive school. According to this study, gymnasium students were more likely to be classified as "selfless" than students attending any other kind of school, and those attending a comprehensive school were more likely to be classified as "self-serving" than those attending any other type of school. This study has been widely criticised. It has been claimed that character cannot be measured on standardised tests and that students' answers might not reflect their real behaviour. Charges were raised that the questions were worded in academic language so students attending a comprehensive school may not have understood them properly. It has also been suggested that the answers the students gave may have been influenced by social class: gymnasium students may have been brought up to think they were selfless, while in reality they were not. Proponents of comprehensive schools stated gymnasium students were phony and elitist while pretending to be selfless.

=== Gymnasium and performance on the TOEFL ===
A study found that college-bound students attending a traditional gymnasium performed better on the TOEFL than those attending a comprehensive school. Still, those did better than college-bound students attending an "Aufbaugymnasium," "Technisches Gymnasium" or "Wirtschaftsgymnasium" (the last three schools serve students who graduated from another school, receiving no Abitur and allow them to earn the Abitur).

Type of school	Percentage of students earning at least 500 points	Percentage of students earning at least 550 points	Percentage of students earning at least 600 points
Traditional gymnasium	64.7%	32.0%	8.1%
Comprehensive school	30.5%	11.3%	2.2%
Aufbaugymnasium	18.9%	5.2%	.9%
Wirtschaftsgymnasium	19.7%	5.7%	.4%
Technical gymnasium	22.3%	12.6%	1.0%

=== Defending comprehensive schools ===
Proponents of comprehensive schools often argue that it is unfair to compare gymnasia and Realschulen with comprehensive schools. While gymnasia and Realschulen often handpick their students, comprehensives are open to all.

Proponents of comprehensives also think they lack the most academically promising young people, who other schools have skimmed off the top. They also point out that some comprehensives (such as the "Laborschule Bielefeld" and the "Helene Lange School" in Wiesbaden) ranked among Germany's best schools.

== Quotas ==
Germany's Left Party introduced a discussion concerning affirmative action. According to Stefan Zillich, quotas should be "a possibility" to help working-class children who do not do well in school gain access to a gymnasium. Headmasters have objected, saying this type of policy would be "a disservice" to poor children, that they would not be able to keep up academically. The headteachers have also expressed concerns that children of working-class families would not feel welcome at gymnasia. Wolfgang Harnischfeger, headmaster of a well-known Berlin gymnasium, has stated,

It can be noticed in children as young as kindergarten students, that children take after their parents. They emulate their language, their way of dressing, their way of spending their free time. Kids from Neukölln [a poor neighbourhood] would not feel good about themselves if they had to attend a type of school that mainly serves students from social classes different from their own. They will not be able to integrate. Every field day, every school party will show that."

He also said, "This kind of policy would weaken the gymnasium," and that this would be dangerous because "German society could not afford to do without the excellence the gymnasium produces." Stefan Zillich answered this, saying that "German society [cannot] afford to have so few adults with a world-class education."

== The Berlin Gymnasium lottery ==
In 2009, the Senate of Berlin decided that Berlin's gymnasium should no longer be allowed to handpick all of its students. It was ruled that while gymnasia should be able to select 70% to 65% of their students, the remaining places should be allocated by lottery. Every child will be able to enter the lottery, regardless of how they performed in primary school. It is hoped that this policy will increase the number of working-class students attending gymnasium. The Left Party proposed that Berlin gymnasia should no longer be allowed to expel students who perform poorly, so that the students who won a gymnasium place in the lottery have a fair chance of graduating from that school. It is not clear yet whether the Berlin Senate will decide in favour of The Left Party's proposal.

== See also ==
- Grammar schools debate
- Gymnasium (school)
- List of schools in Germany
- Abitur after twelve years
