= Aufbaugymnasium =

The Aufbaugymnasium ("Structured Secondary School") is a school for mature students in Germany and Austria. It serves students who graduated from a Hauptschule or Realschule and are headed for the Abitur. It is not to be confused with a traditional Gymnasium, which serves young students who have not graduated from another secondary school before.
