= Helene Lange School =

Coordinates: 50.075°N 8.25694°E

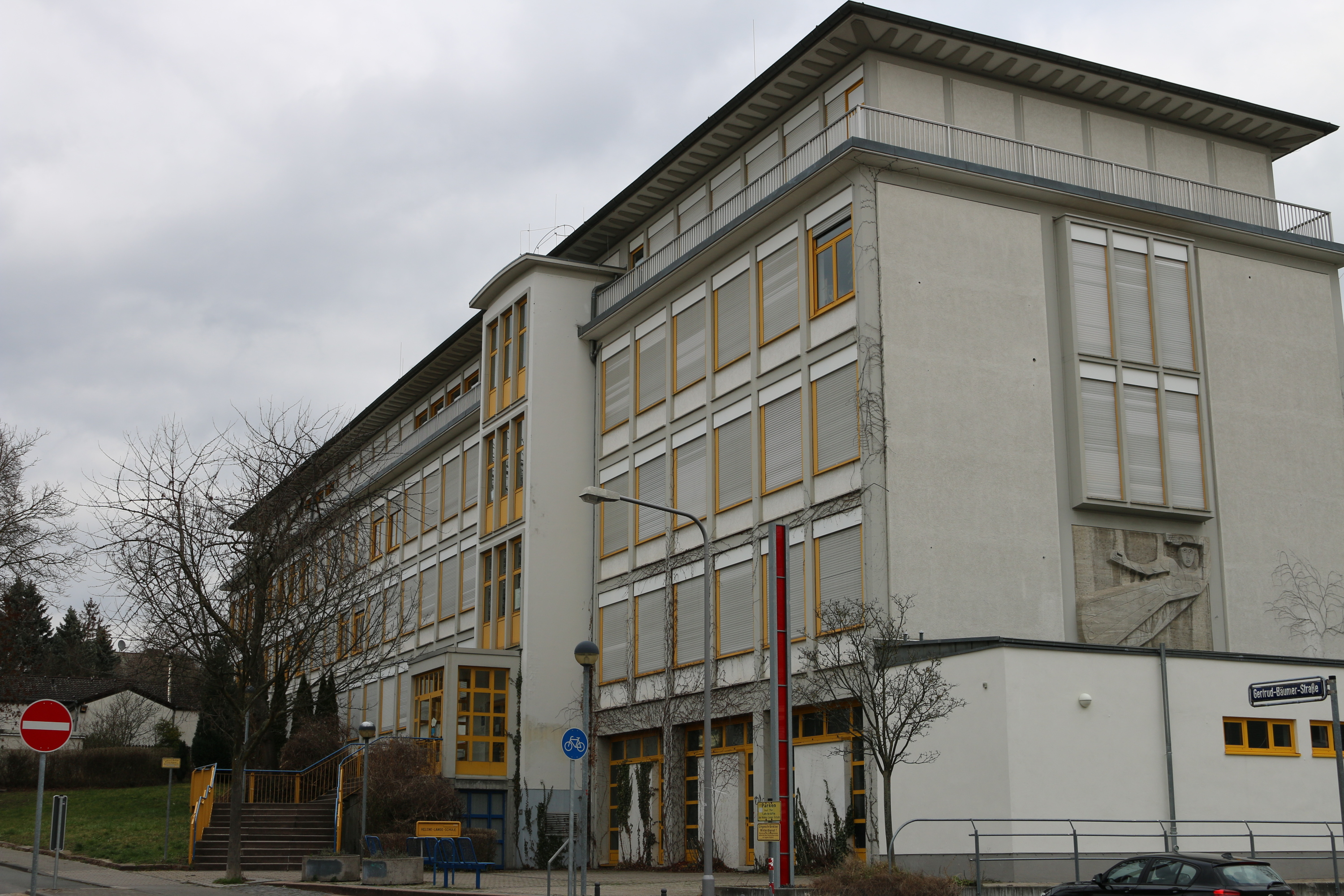

Information
- Established: 1847; 178 years ago
- Gender: Girls (1847-1971); Mixed (1971-Present)

The Helene Lange School is a comprehensive school in Wiesbaden, Germany. The school received much media coverage for its pedagogic methods. While proponents of comprehensive schools believe it is one of Germany's best schools, opponents believe it is just a run-of-the-mill-school that serves privileged children who would do just as well attending any other kind of school.

== History ==
In 1847, the school was founded in Wiesbaden as Höhere Töchterschule. In 1955 the school was named after Helene Lange. At this time it was an all-girls school. In 1971, boys started to be admitted to the school. In 1986, under the leadership of principal Enja Riegel, Helene-Lange-Schule was converted into a "comprehensive school". In 1987 the school became a member of the UNESCO Associated Schools Project. In 2009 it became a Club-of-Rome-School.

== Students ==
The school serves mainly upper-middle-class children. While 42% of all children visiting Wiesbaden schools have at least one parent born abroad, less than 10% of the Helene-Lange students do. Enja Riegel said she would love the Helene-Lange-School to become more diverse, but that minority youngsters simply did not apply for the school.

== Programme for International Student Assessment ==
In 2002 the Helene-Lange-students participated in the Programme for International Student Assessment (PISA), doing well. Breaking the rule that PISA must not be used for school-level evaluation (for which it is methodologically not suited), the media were informed and the Helene-Lange-School was announced Germany's best school. Later it was revealed that while the students really did well, the school was outperformed by most Gymnasien (prep schools) in the south.
