= Büşra Kuru =

German-born Turkish footballer (born 2001)

Personal information
- Date of birth: 24 October 2001 (age 25)
- Place of birth: Weinheim, Baden-Württemberg, Germany
- Position: Midfielder

Team information
- Current team: SSV Waghäusel

Youth career
- 2014–2015: SG Hohensachsen
- 2015–2017: 1899 Hoffenheim
- 2017–2019: FC Speyer

Senior career*
Years	Team	Apps	(Gls)
2019–2022	08 Niederkirchen	11	(1)
2022–2024	Sand	26	(0)
2024–2025	Beylerbeyi		

International career^{‡}
2017–2018	Turkey U17	21	(1)
2018–2019	Turkey U19	15	(0)
2020–	Turkey	21	(1)
- * Club domestic league appearances and goals as of 22 September 2024 ‡ National team caps and goals as of 28 February 2024

Büşra Kuru (born 24 October 2001) is a women's football midfielder who plays for SSV Waghäusel and the Turkey women's national team. Born in Germany, she represents Turkey at the international level.

== Early life ==
Büşra Kuru was born to Turkish parents in Weinheim, Baden-Württemberg, Germany, on 24 October 2001. She studied at Wirtschaftsgymnasium (Johann-Philipp-Reis Schule) in Weinheim.

== Club career ==
Kuru began playing football at age six. She was encouraged by her footballer brother, who took her to the sports field every day. Before she started playing, she pursued the hobbies of swimming and judo. She was part of the Baden selection team from 2011–12 to 2014–15, and in the Southwest selection team since the 2017–18 season.

Kuru played for her hometown club SG Hohensachsen, where she scored 20 goals in the league and cup matches of the 2014–15 season. The following season, she moved to TSG 1899 Hoffenheim. She plays for 1. FFC 08 Niederkirchen in the 2. Frauen-Bundesliga. In the next season, she transferred to 2. Frauen-Bundesliga–South.

In September 2024, she moved to Turkey, and signed with Beylerbeyi to play in the Super League.

== International career ==
Kuru became a member of the Turkey girls' national under-17 team, debuting in the friendly match against Russia on 25 January 2017. She took part at the 2017 UEFA Development Tournament in three of the 2018 UEFA Women's Under-17 Championship qualification – Group 7 matches and three games at the Elite round – Group 6. She was capped 21 times and scored one goal in total for the Turkey girls' under-17 team between 2017 and 2018.

In 2018, Kuru was called up to the Turkey women's under-19 team, and played for the first time in a friendly game against Poland on 28 August. She took part in three matches of the 2019 UEFA Women's Under-19 Championship qualification – Group 2 and Elite round – Group 6 each. She played in 15 matches between 2018 and 2019.

Kuru was selected for the Turkey women's team in 2020. She made her debut in the UEFA Women's Euro 2021 qualifying Group A match against Slovenia on 18 September 2020.
