= Philippi Village =

Social enterprise in Cape Town, South Africa

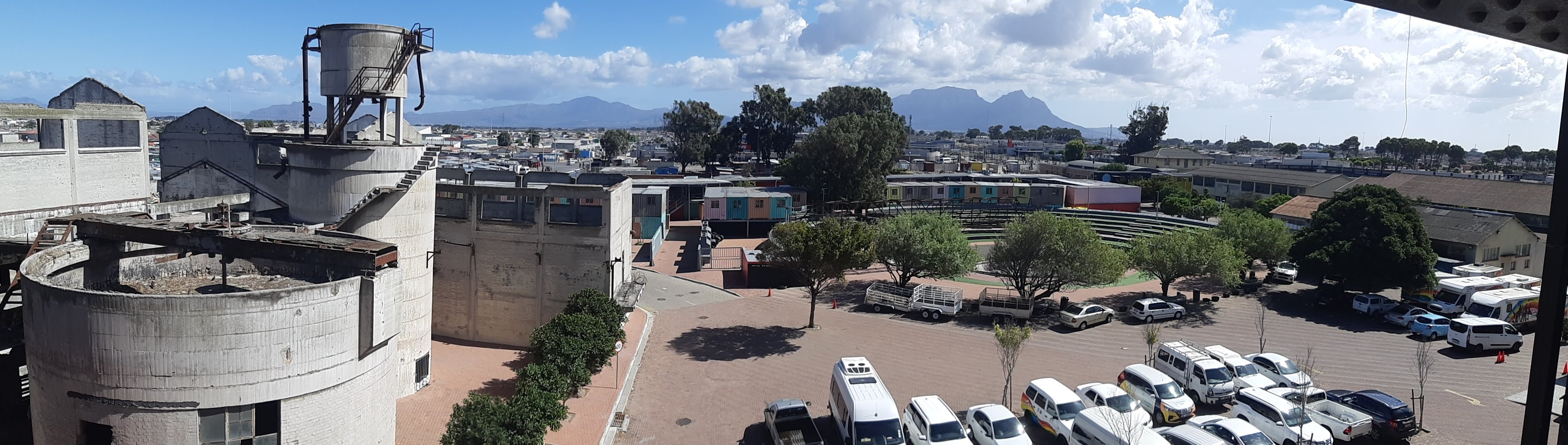
- View from Philippi Village over Browns Farm

General information
- Construction started: 2015
- Completed: 2017
- Opened: 2017

Design and construction
- Architect: RLR Architects
- Developer: Bertha Foundation, CCDI, The Business Place Philippi

Website
- philippivillage.co.za

Philippi Village is a mixed‑use social enterprise and community development hub in Philippi, Cape Flats, in Cape Town, South Africa. The Village provides shared workspaces, business incubation, community infrastructure, education, and recreational facilities, aiming to support local economic development and social cohesion.

== History and Development ==
Philippi Village was developed on a site that formerly housed a cement factory and underutilized industrial land and headed by Bushra Razack, the CEO. In November 2025, the organisation appointed Simphiwe Nikani as the new Chief Executive Officer.

Its establishment involved a partnership between The Business Place Philippi, the Bertha Foundation, and the Cape Craft + Design Institute (CCDI). The project received a capital investment of approximately R80 million, sourced from the Bertha Foundation and the Jobs Fund.

== Mission and Objectives ==
The mission of Philippi Village is to co-create a safe and vibrant space that connects the Philippi community and surroundings to necessary services, employment and educational opportunities, and cultural activities.

The Village supports micro and small enterprises through affordable rental of offices, workshops, and container-based workspaces, paired with mentorship and business development support. It also provides community assets such as an amphitheater, library, and green open spaces to strengthen social infrastructure and civic life.

== Facilities ==
- Container Walk: repurposed shipping containers for offices, studios, and retail.
- Film Studio: production studio for local and international projects.
- Amphitheater: an outdoor venue for performances, markets, and events.
- Sports Facilities: soccer pitch, BMX track, skate park,running course.
- Education & Innovation: University of Cape Town Graduate School of Business (GSB) Solution Space.
- eCentre: public internet access and digital skills training.
- Green and Community Spaces: landscaped public areas and urban greening projects.

== Urban Planning and Community Engagement ==
Philippi Village employs participatory and design-led planning, emphasizing placemaking, community inclusion, and walkable infrastructure. Through negotiated “conscious contracts” with local informal settlements ensured employment opportunities and access to facilities. Philippi Village sits within the Philippi Horticultural Area (PHA), a site of urban development pressure, land rights debates, and food security concerns.

Academic studies also highlight the role of informal production and township economies in shaping Philippi's urban landscape.

== Impact ==
Philippi Village is cited as a model for inclusive urban regeneration, supporting entrepreneurship, youth programs, and community engagement. Greening initiatives by organizations like Greenpop improve ecological sustainability and community well-being. According to the 2024 Impact Report, Philippi Village now hosts more than 120 businesses. The organization employs 73 permanent staff members and 193 temporary employees, while engaging with around 8,400 community members each year through education, entrepreneurship, environmental sustainability, safety, and community-focused initiatives.

== Awards ==
In 2024, Philippi Village's then-CEO, Bushra Razack, received the Best Leader of a Social Enterprise in Africa Award at the Forty under 40 at an award ceremony held in Nairobi, Kenya for her work and contribution at Phillipi Village.

== Gallery ==
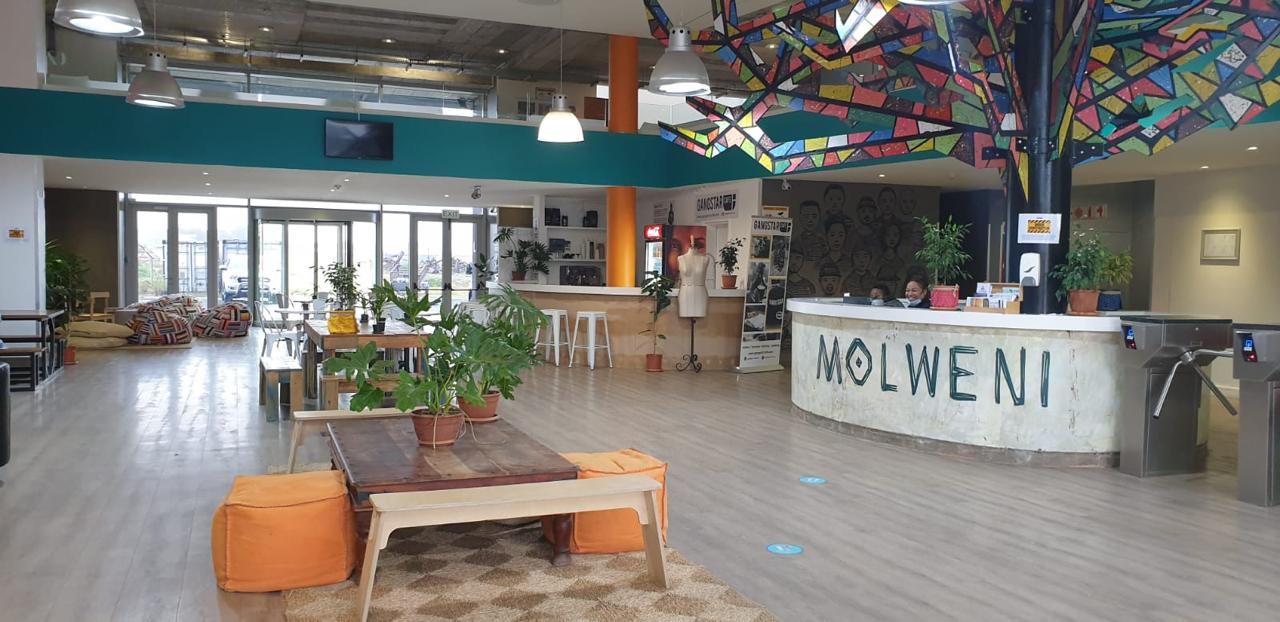
Philippi Village containers modeled as offices,studios and retail.

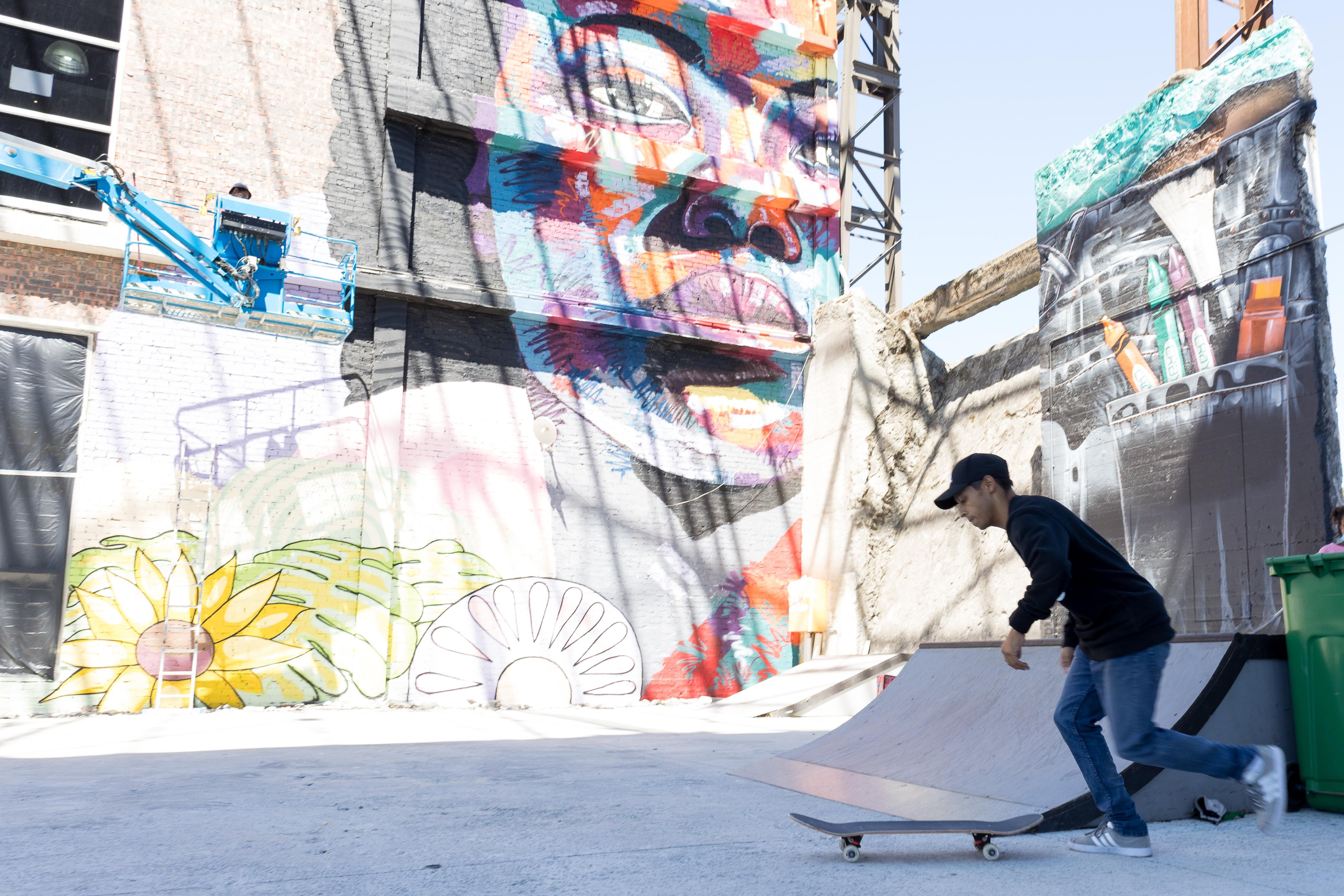
Philippi Village, Philippi, Cape Town, South Africa

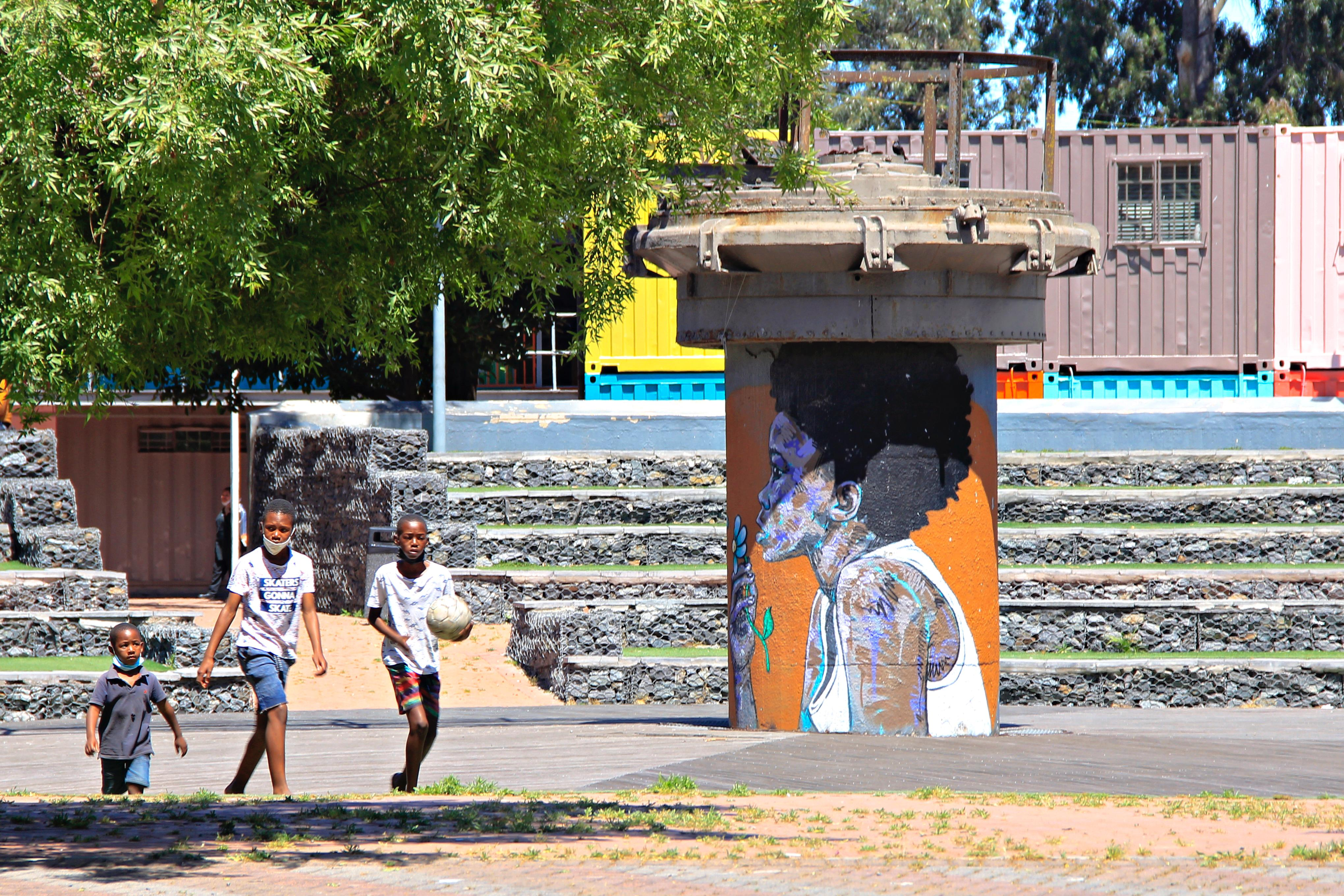
Amphitheater at Philippi Village

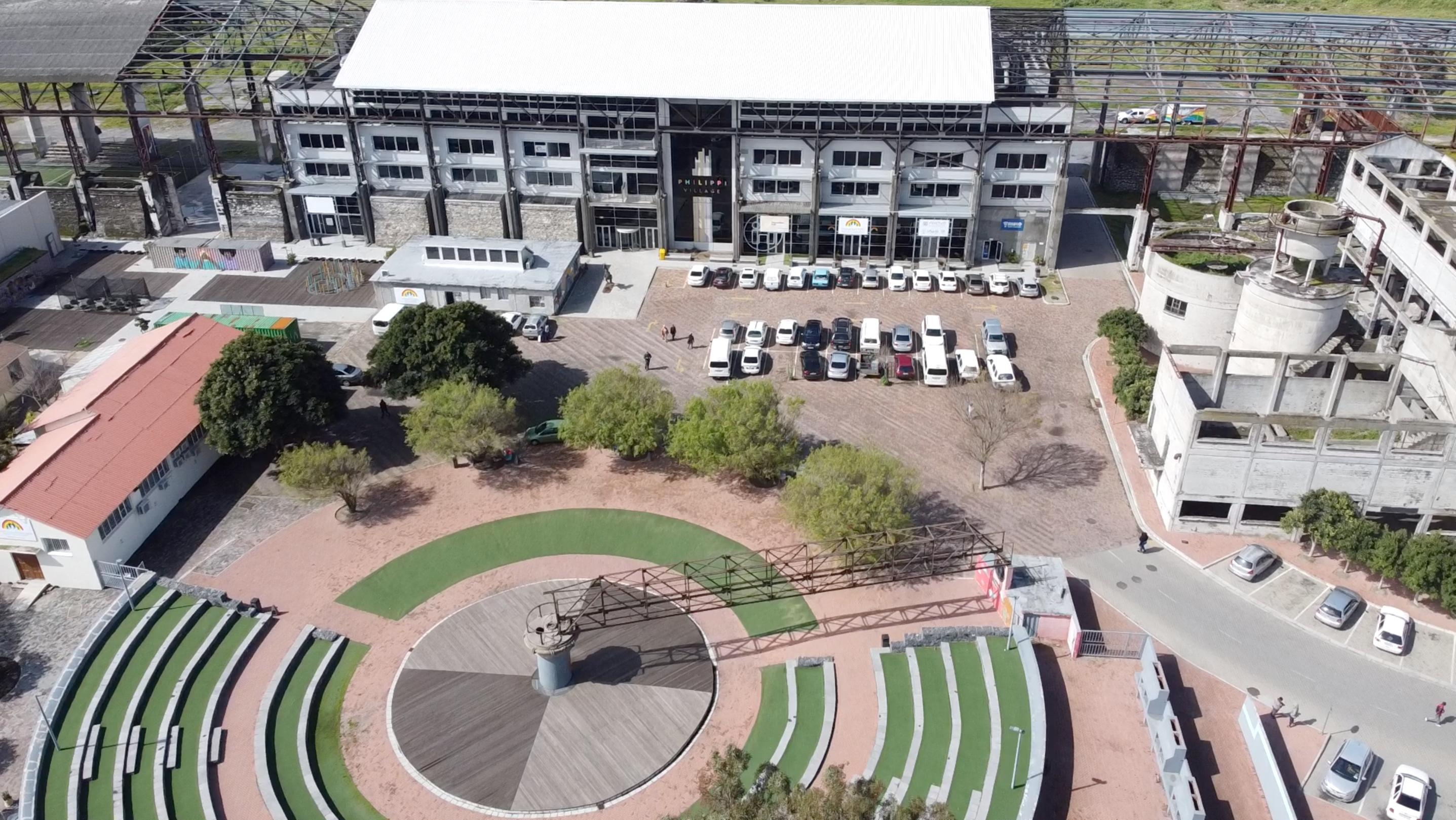
Amphitheater at Philippi Village

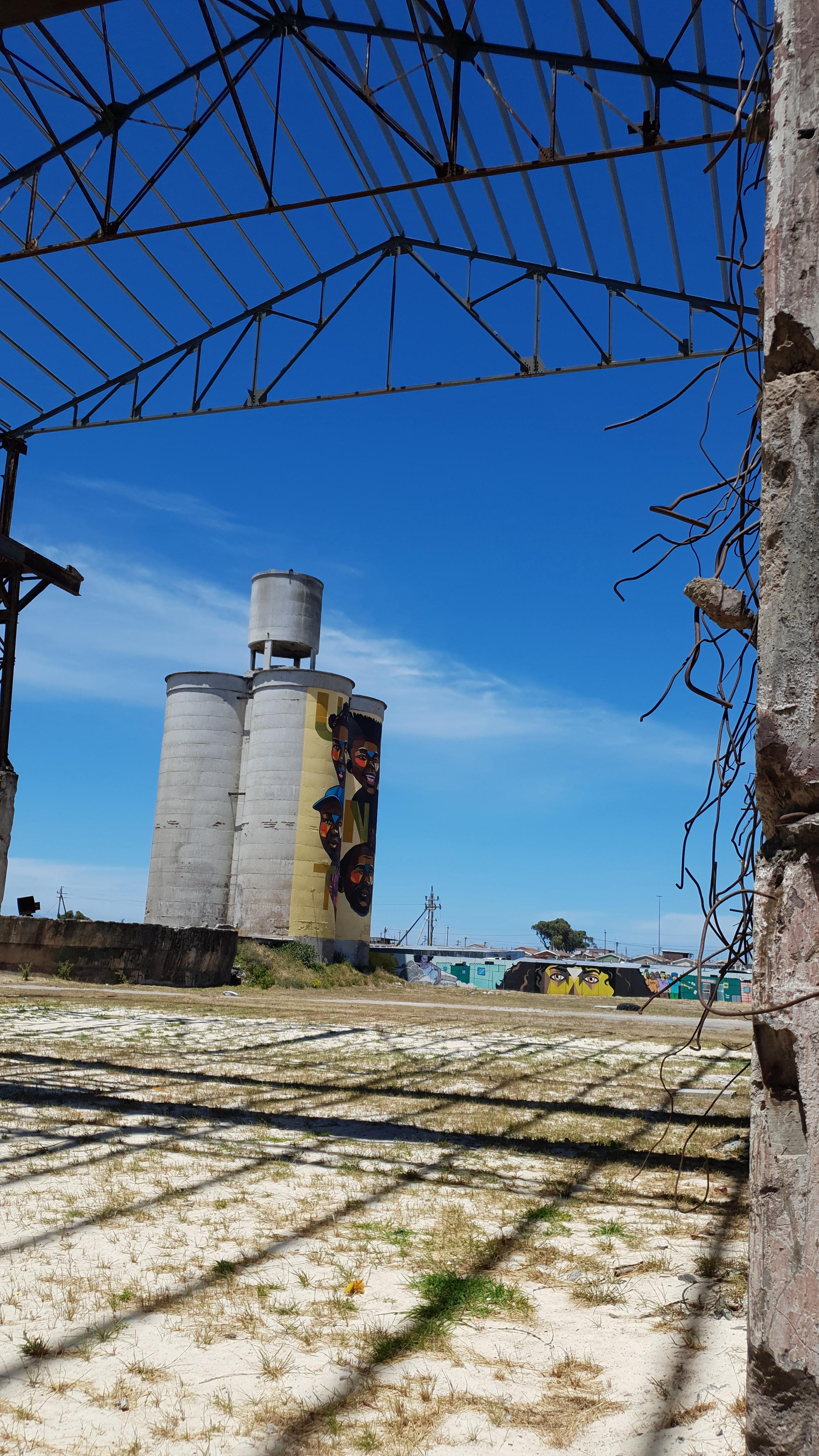
Philippi Village, Philippi, Cape Town, South Africa
