= Bushra Al Fusail =

Yemeni photographer

- Born: Sanaa, Yemen
- Occupation: Photographer

Bushra Al Fusail is a Yemeni photographer and women's rights activist.

== Early and personal life ==
Al Fusail was born in Sanaa. She grew up in Portland, Oregon until she was 12, when she, her sister, and her parents moved back to Yemen. After Al Fusail graduated high school, she attended university while working at a film production company.

While living in Yemen, Al Fusail was part of the minority of women who did not wear niqab.

In the late 2010s, after completing a work project in Jordan, Al Fusail was unable to return to Yemen and applied for asylum in the United States. As of 2021, Al Fusail lived in New York City.

== Activism ==
Al Fusail began organizing women's bike rides in 2015. On social media, she organized the #BikeForYemen campaign, in which she called for women to ride bicycles in Sanaa as a form of protest "against the ongoing conflict, the Saudi led coalition’s blockade... and patriarchal structures that have long marginalized Yemeni women and limited their rights". The campaign had limited turnout, with four women coming to ride bikes, and ten women coming to offer moral support. However, when photos of the event were shared online, they garnered a number of negative comments.

In 2022, she used Facebook to organize a second women's bike ride in Sanaa.

== Art ==
Al Fusail is an artist and photographer. She has undertaken public arts projects in Yemen, such as constructing a wall mosaic from shattered glass caused by an explosion. She is a co-founder of FRAME Yemen, a branch of FRAME.life, which "aims to mobilize citizens to document their community through art". Al Fusail is also an organizer of Everyday Yemen, a Facebook group for sharing street photography taken in the country.

Al Fusail took up photography after high school, and is essentially self-taught. Although her parents initially disapproved, their attitudes changed after 2011. Her photography tends to focus on Yemeni women. Her first exhibit, 10 kg of Justice, addressed the issue of women not receiving their full inheritance. In November and December 2012, Al Fusail exhibited her photography at the Spanish Embassy in Sanaa. For International Women's Day in 2015, Al Fusail was a co-organizer of an exhibition of women's photography at a cafe; her work was also included in the exhibition. She has also exhibited in Sanaa's German House, and had her work shown in Europe.
