= Bushra Massouh =

Syrian politician

member of the Syrian Parliament
- In office 2003–2007

Personal details
- Born: 1958 (age 67–68) Marmarita, Syria
- Party: Syrian Social Nationalist Party

Bushra Fuad Massouh is a Syrian politician and member of the Syrian Social Nationalist Party.
