= Bushra Hyder =

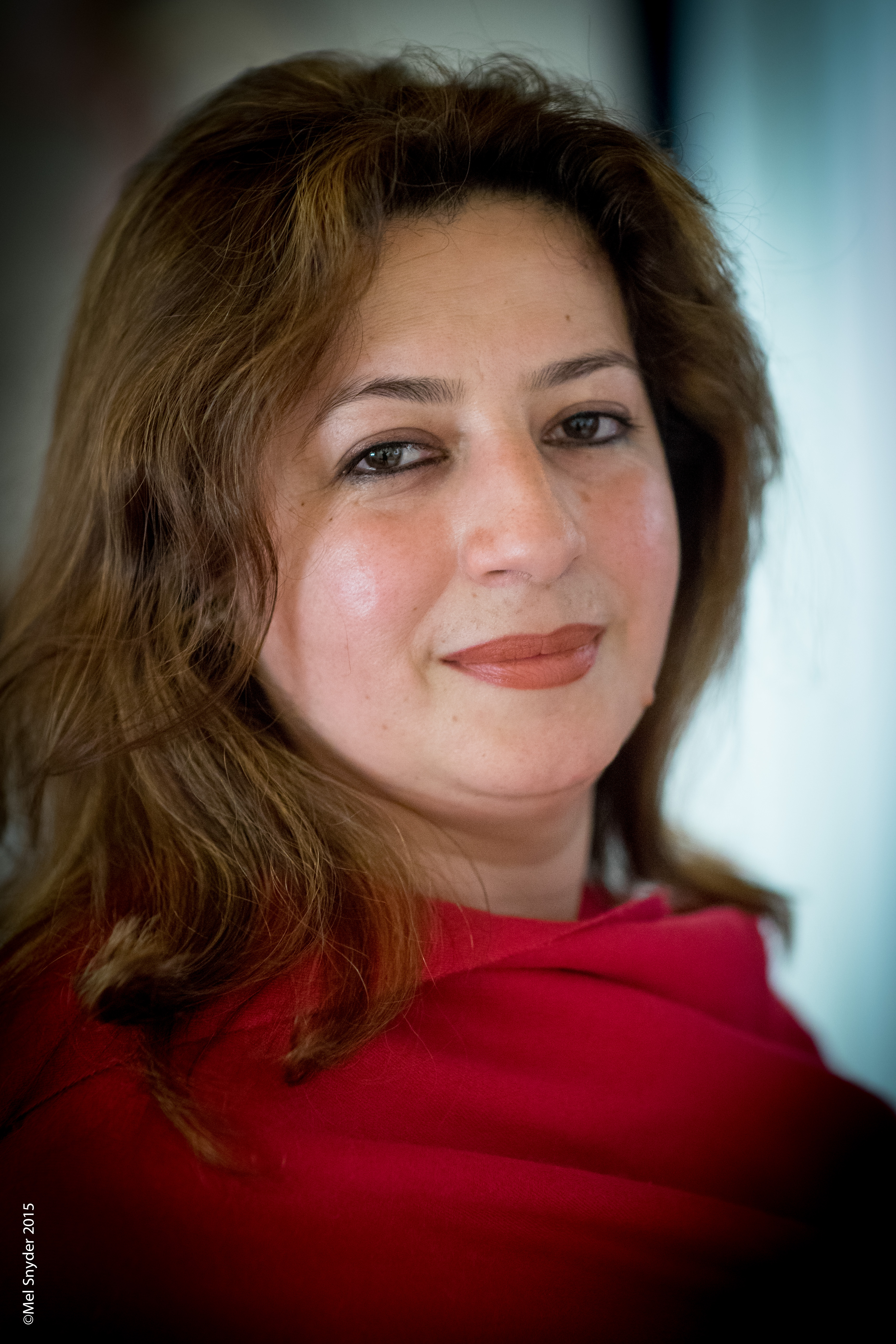
Bushra Hyder in 2015.

Bushra Hyder is a Pakistani schoolteacher and peace activist. Hyder has a Master's in English literature.

== Career ==
Hyder founded and runs the Qadims Lumiere School and College in Peshawar, Pakistan, which had 1000 students in 2012. The school places a heavy emphasis on its peace curriculum, introduced in 2009, which entails education on a variety of religions and cultures designed to foster understanding and acceptance. Hyder has lobbied to get other schools in the region and country to implement similar curricula.

Hyder has co-founded the Women's Alliance for Security Leadership, and is a member of the PAIMAN Alumni Trust Pakistan, an organisation which opposes Islamic extremism. She works with politicians and religious leaders to counter extremism.

In 2015, she was one of the 17 women who “change the world” and participated in the 2015 Inclusive Security conference.
