= Bushra Khalil =

Lebanese lawyer

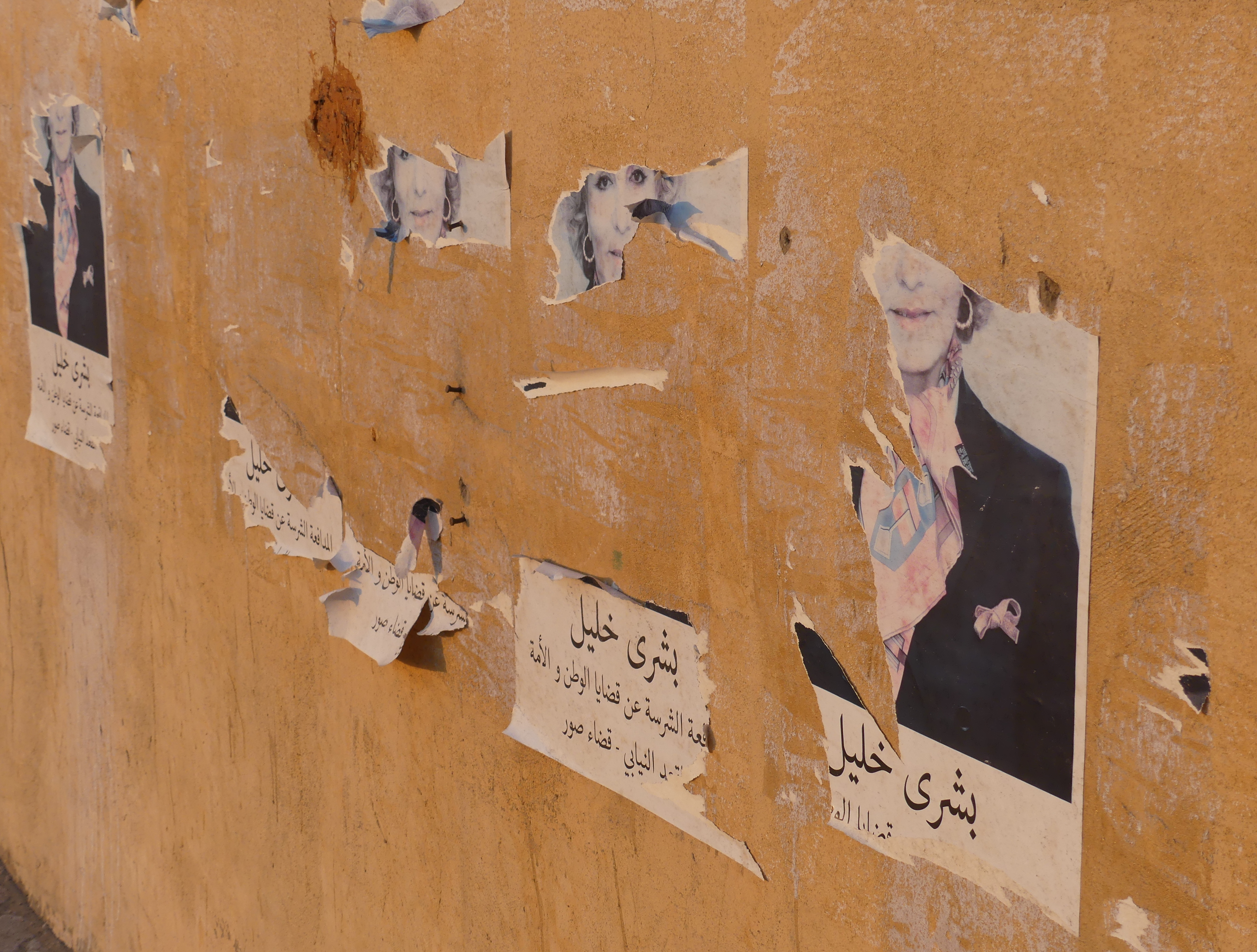
Torn posters of Khalil on a wall in Tyre/Sour after the 2019 by-election

Bushra Khalil (Arabic: بشرى خليل) is a Lebanese Shiite lawyer from Southern Lebanon. Originally from the town of Jwaya, Khalil graduated from the Lebanese University (UL) in 1979 with a law degree.

She is best known as one of the legal defenders of former Iraqi president Saddam Hussein when he was on trial for genocide and crimes against humanity. Khalil joined Hussein's legal team just days after his capture in 2003; her participation attracted controversy because Khalil is a Shi'ite Muslim. Khalil is reported to be the only woman that met Hussein during the months of his trial. Khalil was repeatedly thrown out of court during Saddam's trials, after disruptive behavior and arguments with the judge. Khalil also represented other defendants associated with the Hussein regime, including former Vice President of Iraq Taha Yassin Ramadan. Her public role as a legal representative of the former regime caused her to face repeated death threats.

Khalil campaigned repeatedly for a seat in the Lebanese Parliament, but was never elected. In 2019, she ran as a candidate for the by-election of Tyre District, but

"agreed [..] to throw in the towel after Hezbollah General Sectary Hassan Nassrallah asked her."
