= Bushra Al-Bustani =

Iraqi poet and journalist (born 1949)

- Born: 1949 (73 years old)
- Citizenship: Iraq
- Education: College of Arts, University of Baghdad
- Occupations: Poet, University Professor, Critic, Writer

Bushra Al-Bustani (Arabic:بشرى البستاني; born 1949) is an Iraqi poet, critic and journalist who was born in Mosul and received her primary school at the Iraqi secondary school in Al Marifah Middle School and Central Prep Mosul. She then moved to Baghdad to complete her undergraduate studies in the Arabic Language Department of the Faculty of Education, University of Baghdad, and returned to Mosul after earning her bachelor's degree to work as an Arabic language teacher.

== Family ==
Al-Bustani belong to the tribe of Tayy, Mosul. She is the mother of several political and social figures in Iraq such as Khalil Ismail Al-Bustani, Saad Khalil Ismail and Nidal Al-Bustani and they have close familial ties to the families of Sati' al-Husri and Rashid Ali al-Gaylani.

== Career ==
Al-Bustani was named professor in 1998 and First Professor of Mosul University in 2000.

During her career, Al-Bustani participated in the work of more than 50 scientific conferences at Iraqi and Arab universities and more than 50 Iraqi, Arab and international cultural and creative conferences.

Al-Bustani worked as an Arabic language school teacher and worked in the Teachers' House and the Teachers' Institute, and the Principal of the Kifah Middle School until 1981.

She has served as Professor of Literature and Criticism at the Faculty of Arts/University of Mosul 1985 and continues to work in it.

Al-Bustani supervised students' creative events in Nineveh education throughout her work, and participated in the cultural activities of mass organizations through their responsibility for the Culture, Media and Arts Committee of the General Federation of Women of Iraq 1974 to 1994.

Al-Bustani served as a member of the Central Committee for the Supervision of General Ministerial Examinations at Mosul University.

Al-Bustani is responsible for supervising youth creative activities in literature at Mosul University from 1989 to present.

Al-Bustani contributed to more than a dozen books in literature, criticism, society and human rights, including the book Al-Burda Forum, Women and Development, Citizenship Rights, Theatre in Mosul, Islamic Criticism and six books at the Festival of Al-Murbid Poetry in Baghdad from 1996 to 2002.

She has consultant for Rafidain Literature, Academic Education and Science. Editor-in-chief of a series on studies in language, literature and criticism issued by the Sayyab Foundation for Printing, Publishing, Distribution and Translation - London, Editor-in-Chief of the Cyber Letters Magazine of the Sayab Foundation, Editor of the Book of Deliberation in Linguistic and Critical Research.

Al-Bustani is a recipient of the Medal of Science from the Ministry of Higher Education and Scientific Research twice and the Two-Time Medal of Creativity from the Ministry of Culture and the Arts, the Women's Badge from the General Federation of Iraqi Women, as well as more than forty discretionary certificates from Iraqi, Arab and international scientific and cultural institutions.

== Publications ==
1. Post-Grief, Beirut, Renaissance 1973
2. Song and Knife, Baghdad, 1975
3. Me and the Bracelet, Mosul University, 1977
4. Garden Blossom, Baghdad, 1983
5. I accept Iraq's palm, Baghdad 1988
6. The sea fishes the banks, Baghdad 2000
7. Tree Pumps, Baghdad, 2002
8. What the wind left, Damascus, 2002
9. Booze Table Spin, Tigris House, Mosul 2004
10. Andalusiat for Iraq's wounds, Beirut, 2010
11. Eve's addresses, Cairo, 2010
12. B. Ain, Amman, 2011
13. Al-Wadd Book, Amman, 1011
14. Five Ordeal, Amman 2012
15. Night Phones, Stories, Amman, 2012

== Books on literary criticism ==
- Studies in Arab women's poetry, Amman, Balsam House - 1998
- Analysis of poetry, Algeria, Arabic Book House, 2002

== Collaborations ==
- Lists despite the blockade - Collaboration, Cairo, i 1, 2001
- Iraq Obelisk, Collaboration, General Federation of Literature, University of Mosul, 1994
- Mosul in the eyes of poetry, Mosul University, 2010
