= Bushra Razack =

South African community development specialist (born 1986)

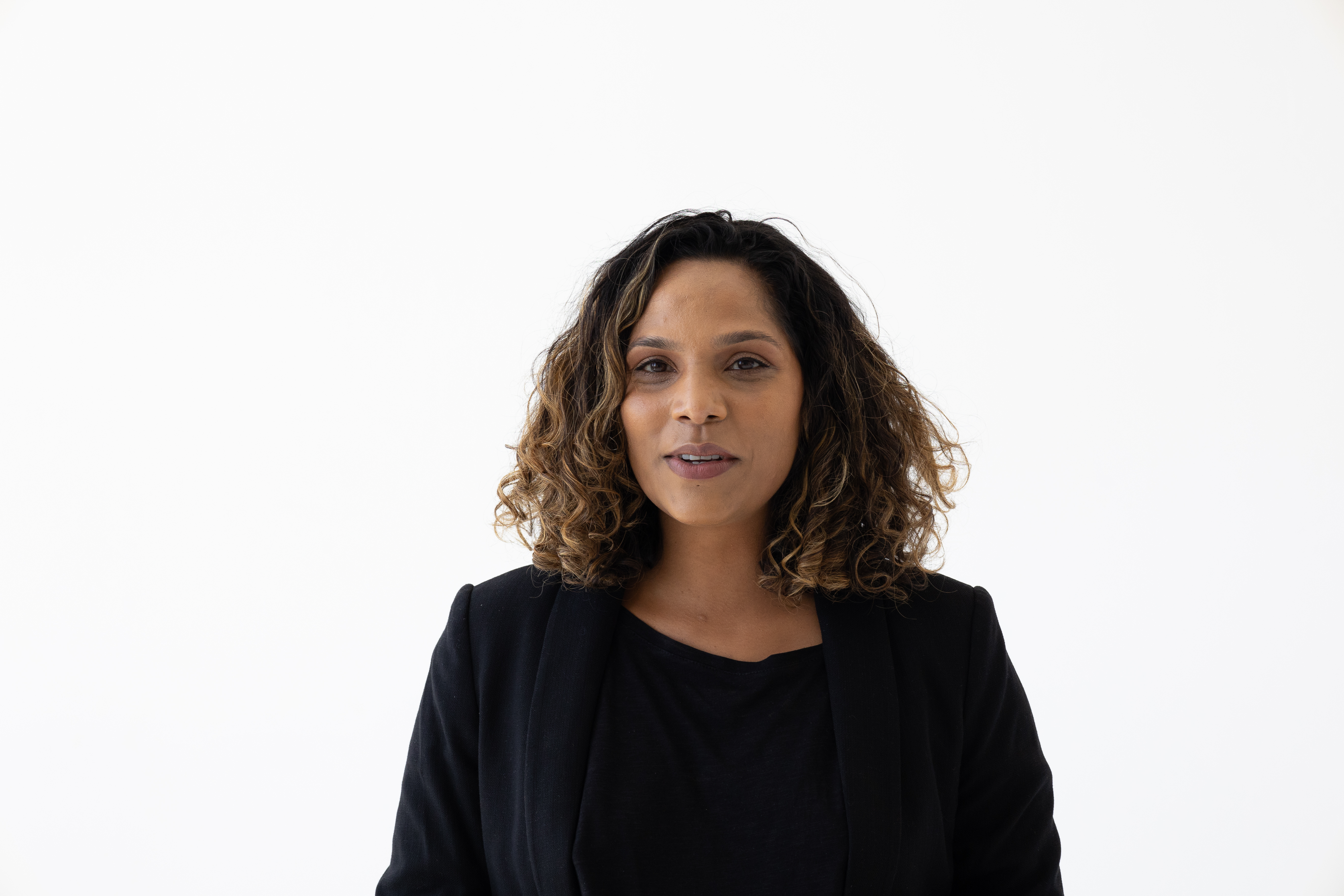
- Born: 2 May 1986 (age 40); Cape Town, South Africa
- Education: University of the Western Cape
- Occupation: Community developer
- Website: www.philippivillage.co.za

Bushra Razack (born 2 May 1986) is a South African community development specialist, social impact leader, and systems thinker. She is best known for her role as a former CEO of Philippi Village, a mixed-use community and business hub in Philippi, Cape Flats, in Cape Town. Her work spans inclusive economic development, social entrepreneurship, youth development, community safety and urban regeneration, youth development, and social enterprise.

== Early life ==
Razack was born in Cape Town, in the Western Cape province of South Africa. At the age of twelve, she represented South Africa at the first World Youth Congress, known as the Millennium Young People's Congress in Honolulu County, Hawaii. She is a co-author of the book :"Rescue Mission", a youth assessment of the UN's Millennium Development Goals which was launched at the World Summit for Sustainable Development in Johannesburg, South Africa.

== Career and Phillipi village ==
Razack began working as the chief executive officer at Philippi Village in August 2018. Philippi Village is a mixed-use social enterprise and community development hub in Philippi, Cape Flats, in Cape Town, South Africa. The village provides shared workspaces, business incubation, community infrastructure, education, and recreational facilities, aiming to support local economic development and social cohesion. Razack is recognized for building collaborations between communities, government, businesses, and civil society to address complex social and economic challenges.

=== Phillipi Village ===
Razack joined Philippi Village as chief executive officer in August 2018, where, under her leadership, the organization expanded its role as a mixed-use social enterprise and community development hub in Philippi, Cape Town.

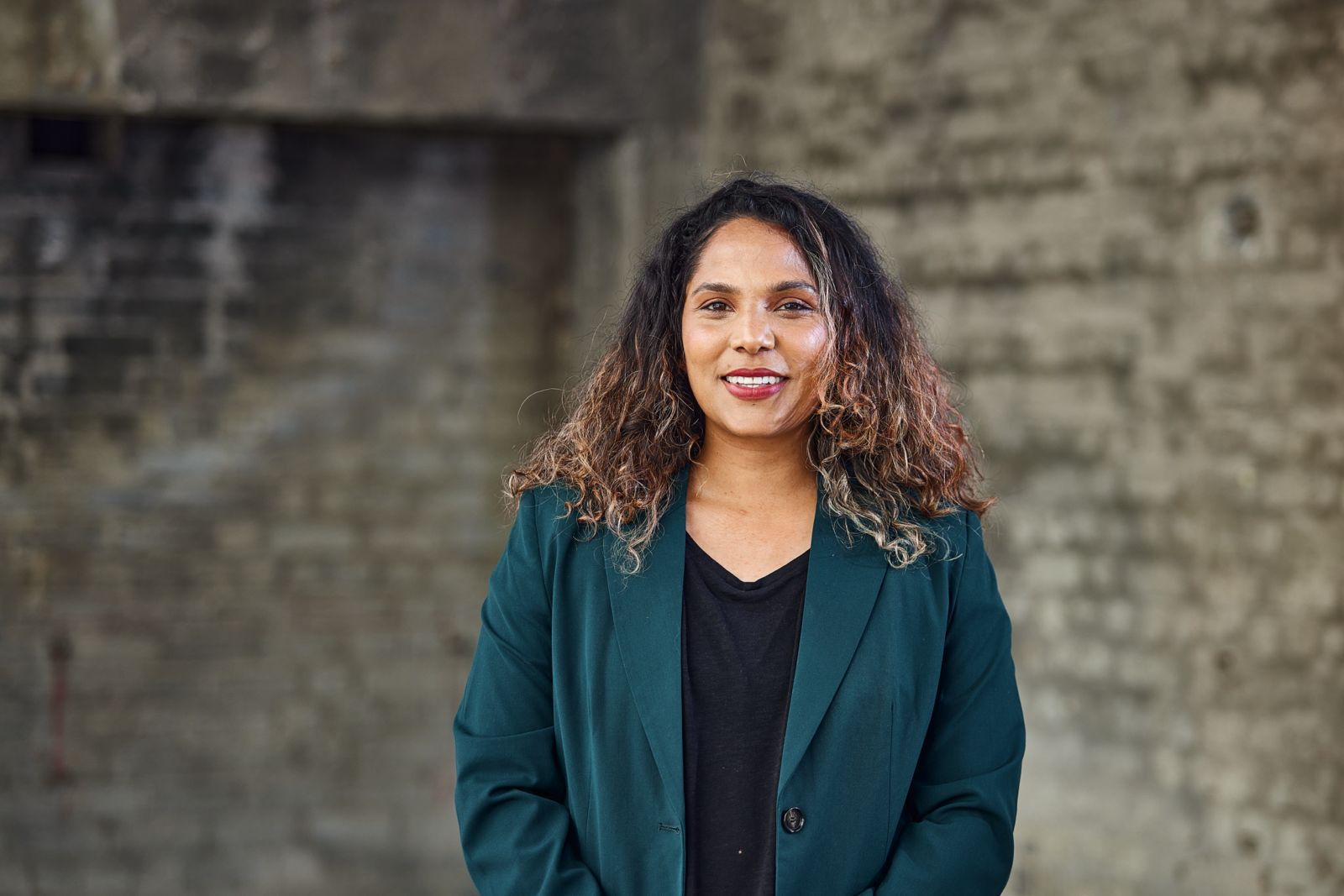
Bushra Razack, former CEO of Philippi Village

Philippi Village brings together entrepreneurship support, business incubation, education and skills development, community infrastructure, and collaborative workspaces, with a focus on inclusive economic development and community-led regeneration in the Cape Flats. Following her departure from the organization in 2025, Razack continued her involvement with Philippi Village as a non-executive board member.

In 2024, Razack received the Best Social Enterprise in Africa Award at the Forty under 40 awards ceremony held on 30 March 2024 in Nairobi, Kenya for her work and contribution to Philippi Village.

Razack serves on several boards and advisory bodies, including Boschendal Wine Estate, Be The Earth (Trustee), Bertha Centre For Social Innovation (steering committee member); Heartshine Foundation (non-executive board member); and Philippi Village (non-executive board member). She also advises a South African family office on social strategy, partnerships, and impact.

== Awards and recognition ==
- The Young Independents, Mzansi's 100 of 2017: Healer.
- In 2018 She was counted amongst the Top Young Independents.
- She was also awarded the Power Woman Award as Innovation Woman 2018.
- 40 Under 40 Awards—Best African Leader of a Social Entreprise (2024).
- Best in Community Development at the Forty Under 40 South Africa Awards (2024)
- Selected as a member of the 10th Cohort of Global Female Leaders for the Vital Visionaries Program – a program run in partnership with Vital Voices Global Partnership and the Estée Lauder Emerging Leaders Fund
- At the Three Cities Leadership Forum 2024, Bushra Razack was selected as one of Cape Town's emerging leaders.
- African Leadership Initiative Fellow: Class XVI 2026.

== Personal life ==
Razack is a mom to two children. One of them is Ayana Razack, an activist and founder of the WO project. Ayana is taking the city of Cape Town to account and making sure that the city's parks are safe spaces where children can play without fear.
