= Macteens =

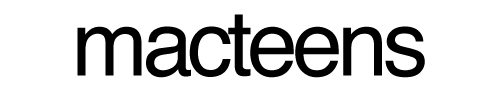

- Screenshot of macteens.com
- Website type: Online Magazine
- Owner: MT Network
- Creators: Chris Saribay; Andrew Wilkinson; Colin Winslow; Clark Mueller
- Website: macteens.com
- Commercial: Yes
- Registration: Optional

Macteens was an Apple Macintosh community website and online magazine targeted towards teenage users, featuring news, reviews, and forums, established in 1998. Following a period of dormancy, the website was revived in December 2001, by Chris Saribay and Andrew Wilkinson. It was under extensive redevelopment and recently has an almost all-new masthead of authors, editors and designers. It was under the management of Daniel Hollister when the site went down.

== History ==
Macteens (branded as "MacTeens") was originally formed as collaborative weblog formed in late 1998 by Neil Sroka and Jonathan Claydon. The website continually featured daily entries that noted news and the opinions of contributors. This early version of the website did not have any interactive portions, but had partnered with a website named MacParty to jointly host community discussion forums. This original incarnation of Macteens was also the first to discover the existence of Apple's Power Mac G4 Cube in 2000, before its official unveiling due to an accidental posting of specifications on ATi's website. Later, in that same year, the website was shut down, citing a floundering interest in the concept.

The website was closed until late 2001, when Chris Saribay and Andrew Wilkinson began working to restore the website to its past glory. In 2002, with the assistance of Clark Mueller and Colin Winslow, the rebranded "Macteens" was launched, complete with new content from Macworld Conference and Expo. The website continued to grow and evolve, eventually incorporating discussion forums and image galleries. Unique magazine-style content was added, including tutorials, reviews and investigative reports. Such reports would occasionally be referenced by those in the traditional media, including an article in the Baltimore Sun that included excerpts of a Macteens report; noting several government related features in Mac OS X. Macteens contributors were also interviewed by television news crews, including G4techTV, CBC and MSNBC. Macteens continued to publish magazine-style content on its website, focusing on special event coverage of Mac events, such as Macworld Conference and Expo and Apple's Worldwide Developers Conference, in addition to daily news, new product reviews and industry analysis.

Headed by Daniel Hollister, Macteens intended on shifting focus back onto a magazine format with regular articles, reviews and how-tos. Multimedia is also intended to be implemented, with a series of podcasts and screencasts featuring discussions, tutorials and Mac-related news stories.

The site remained down as of July 28, 2011, with text on the site reading "returning soon. seriously".

== Extended projects, "teens" franchise ==
Macteens has a history of launching companion websites to further its reach into its target market. Some of these websites have a specific message (as in the case of DontBuyMusic, see below), while others extend the website's reach into other operating systems, such as Linux and Microsoft Windows.

=== DontBuyMusic.com ===
In April 2003, Apple Computer had announced its new online-based music store, the iTunes Music Store, selling songs for 99¢. Shortly after the launch of this product, in August, a competing vendor (BuyMusic.com) began offering a similar product, selling music online. However, instead of using the companies' own marketing resources and assets, they closely mimicked and replicated Apple's marketing. Notably, this included both companies' television advertisements; both featured people singing their favorite songs, aided by an MP3 player. Aside from a different title card noting the respective websites of each vendor at the end of each advertisement, the advertisements were identical.

Macteens quickly took note of this, and began creating a parody of the website, named DontBuyMusic.com. Days later, lawyers representing Direct Response Network, parent company of BuyMusic.com, sent a legal order to Macteens' hosting providers, ordering that the site be deconstructed and removed, ironically citing that the use of copyrighted materials was prohibited. Despite being protected by fair use laws, Macteens decided to shut down DontBuyMusic for a short period of time, while they worked to create a very similar website using their own code-base and graphics. As time progressed, BuyMusic.com began changing its marketing (and was eventually assimilated into Buy.com), and the website declined in popularity. As of this writing, DontBuyMusic.com forwards to the Macteens website.

=== Linuxteens ===
April 2004 brought the second member of the "teen franchise" for Macteens, with the creation of Linuxteens. Linuxteens was established with the same goals set in mind for Macteens: providing a community for teenagers, this time being users of the Linux operating system. Aside from covering news and including interactive portions such as discussion forums, the site also aims to develop and distribute its own version of Linux (development currently shelved). In early 2007, Linuxteens left the Macteens group (becoming www.teenlug.com). Teenlug is an entirely separate and unrelated network.
