= Büşra Beyazbal =

Turkish boxer and Muay Thai practitioner

- Born: 1998 (age 27–28); Gölbaşı, Adıyaman, Turkey
- Nationality: Turkish
- Division: +81 kg (Boxing); 75 kg (Muay Thai)

Büşra Beyazbal
Medal record

Representing Turkey

Women's Boxing

European Championships
| Bronze medal – third place | 2016 Samsun | Junior +81 kg |

Women's Muay Thai

IFMA World Championships
| Silver medal – second place | 2024 Patras | 75 kg |
| Silver medal – second place | 2022 Abu Dhabi | 75 kg |

European Championship
| Silver medal – second place | 2024 Pristina | 75 kg |

Büşra Beyazbal (born 1998) is a Turkish boxer and Muay Thai practitioner.

== Personal life ==
Büşra Beyazbal was born at Gölbaşı, Adıyaman, Turkey in 1998.

After completing her secondary education at the Anadolu İmam Hatip High School in her hometown, she attended Gaziantep University.

== Sport career ==
=== Boxing ===
During her high school years, she got interested in martial arts. Actually, she wanted to perform Muay Thai, however, her teacher led her to boxing sport.

Beyazbal took the bronze medal in the Juniors +81 kg event at the 2016 European Boxing Olympic Qualification Tournament in Samsun, Turkey.

=== Muay Thai ===
At the 2022 IFMA World Muaythai Championships held in Abu Dhabi, United Arab Emirates, Beyazbal received the silver medal in the Elite Senior 75 kg event.

She took the silver medal in the Elite Senior 75 kg event at the 2024 IFMA World Muaythai Championships in Patras, Greece. At the 2024 European Championships in Pristina, Kosovo, she won the silver medal in the 75 kg division.
