= Bushra Mateen =

Pakistani academic administrator (1943–2021)

- Born: 10 October 1943
- Died: 8 April 2021 (aged 77)
- Occupations: Educator, Professor, Sports administrator
- Relatives: Mohammad Din Butt (father); Khawaja Abdul Mateen (husband)
- Awards: Tamgha-e-Imtiaz (Medal of Distinction) by the President of Pakistan in 2013

Bushra Mateen (10 October 1943 – 8 April 2021) was a Pakistani chemist, academic, and professor emeritus who served as the first vice-chancellor of Lahore College for Women University.

== Early life and career ==
Bushra Mateen was born on 10 October 1943 in Lahore, Pakistan. Her father was Mohammad Din Butt and her husband's name is Khawaja Abdul Mateen. She received her MSc degree in chemistry at Punjab University, Lahore and got her Ph.D. degree from the Queen Mary, University of London.

About 30 of Mateen's research publications are currently published in both national and international journals. She has been teaching Master's level organic chemistry, biochemistry and environmental chemistry for more than 37 years. As a Vice-Chancellor, she played a key role in getting Lahore College for Women upgraded to a university status in 2002. She was able to bring about improvements of education in general and science education in particular while she served at this university.

== Sports administrator ==
Besides her academic activities, Bushra Mateen was a highly active participant in sports and is a Life Member of Hilal Ahmar (Red Crescent equivalent to Red Cross in Pakistan), for their Punjab, Pakistan branch. She is a member of Pakistan Hockey Federation Council.

== Social worker ==
Bushra Mateen has also been active as a social worker in Pakistan:

- Bushra Mateen was appointed as ISESCO/UNESCO chair for women in science in the Asian region at Lahore College for Women University in 2005.
- In 2011, Bushra Mateen was the chief guest at an inter-university debating competition in Lahore. The competition was held at the Lahore College for Women University.

== Awards and recognition ==
- Tamgha-e-Imtiaz (Medal of Distinction) by the President of Pakistan in 2013.
- UNESCO Chair for women in science in Asian Region in 2005
