= Wirtschaftsgymnasium =

Typo of school in Germany

A Wirtschaftsgymnasium (plural Wirtschaftsgymnasien) is a kind of school in Germany. Unlike the German Gymnasium, which spans grades (years) 5 to 13, the Wirtschaftsgymnasium has only the top three grades (Oberstufe) and specializes in teaching business-related topics beside the normal subjects in the Gymnasium.

== Admission ==
Admission to the Wirtschaftsgymnasium is voluntary for all students in the tenth year of the Realschule or the same year at the Gymnasium. In order to be allowed to attend a Wirtschaftsgymnasium, a student from the Realschule needs satisfactory grades (marks) in the main subjects German, Mathematics and English, namely an average grade better than 3.0 (in the German grade system, which goes from 1 (best) to 6 (worst). Moreover, the student is not allowed to have grades worse than 4 in the three aforementioned subjects. Students from the Gymnasium need marks (grades) that would have allowed them to move up to the next grade (year) at Gymnasium.

If too many students apply for admission to a specific Wirtschaftsgymnasium, the school is allowed to set a higher admissions standard.

== Subjects ==
In Germany, education is the responsibility of the federal state (Land); so the requirements and classes differ from state to state. The following article gives the situation in Baden-Württemberg.

In the first year at Wirtschaftsgymnasium (11th grade, the eleventh year of school education), pupils can take another foreign language in addition to English (which is compulsory). Generally, the alternatives differ from school to school, but French and Spanish are the most common. If a school has no teacher for Spanish, all students are required to take French.

The type of language course that a student is permitted to take depends on what school the student previously attended. A student who previously attended a Gymnasium, or took the French class at the Realschule, will already have had three years of a second foreign language (usually French) and may take the advanced course in French (Französich - Niveau A) or the beginners' course in Spanish (Spanisch - Niveau B). Student coming from a Realschule without a former second foreign language are free to choose between the beginners' class in French or Spanish (Französisch / Spanisch - Niveau B).

All pupils are required to take the subject Economics and Business Accounting (Betriebs- und Volkswirtschaftslehre mit wirtschaftlichem Rechnungswesen, VBRW for short). In Baden-Württemberg, students are required to attend six lessons (of 45 minutes) a week in this subject.

In the second year, the Kursstufe begins. All marks now count toward Abitur, the final exam, passing which permits students to attend universities in Germany.

Students now have to take one additional major subject (Leistungskurs) in addition to the compulsory major subject of Economics and Business Accounting.

== Exams ==
To be awarded a pass in the final Abitur exam, students must obtain a pass in Economics and Business Accounting, one language (German, English or their second foreign language) and three others subjects from their timetable. Students who took a beginners' course in a second foreign language are only allowed to take an oral exam in this subject.

== See also ==
- Abitur
- Gymnasium (school)
- Education in Germany
