= List of schools in Germany =

This is a list of schools in Germany, sorted by bundesland (states). There are more than forty thousand schools in Germany, so this list only includes those with Wikipedia articles.

Schools that are universities are listed separately; see list of universities in Germany.

== Baden-Württemberg ==
- Albertville-Realschule, Winnenden
- Alexander-von-Humboldt-Gymnasium, Konstanz
- Bertha-Benz-Schule, Nöttingen
- Evangelische Seminare Maulbronn und Blaubeuren, Blaubeuren
- Geschwister-Scholl-Schule, Tübingen
- Gymnasium Achern, Achern
- Gymnasium Remchingen, Remchingen
- Gymnasium Schramberg, Schramberg
- Hegau-Gymnasium, Singen
- Hohenstaufen-Gymnasium, Göppingen
- Hölderlin-Gymnasium, Lauffen am Neckar
- Kepler-Gymnasium, Ulm
- Kolleg St. Blasien, St. Blasien
- Landesgymnasium für Hochbegabte, Schwäbisch Gmünd
- Montfort Realschule Zell, Zell im Wiesental
- Schule Birklehof, Hinterzarten
- Schule Schloss Salem, Salm
- Zabergäu-Gymnasium, Brackenheim

=== Bad Mergentheim ===
- Abendrealschule

=== Biberach ===
- Pestalozzi-Gymnasium
- Wieland-Gymnasium

=== Bruchsal ===
- St. Paulusheim

=== Freiburg ===
- Deutsch-Französische Gymnasien
- Robert Bosch United World College
- Wentzinger-Gymnasium

=== Heidelberg ===
- Heidelberg International School
- Helmholtz-Gymnasium Heidelberg

=== Heilbronn ===
- Theodor-Heuss-Gymnasium

=== Karlsruhe ===
- Bismarck Gymnasium
- European School Karlsruhe
- Goethe-Gymnasium

=== Pforzheim ===
- Fritz Erler School
- Reuchlin-Gymnasium

=== Stuttgart ===
- Eberhard-Ludwigs-Gymnasium
- International School of Stuttgart
- Stuttgart High School

=== Tauberbischofsheim ===
- Kaufmännische Schule Tauberbischofsheim, Wirtschaftsgymnasium

=== Überlingen ===
- Schule Schloss Salem (Upper School Campuses: Schloss Spetzgart and Härlen)

== Bavaria ==
- Anton-Bruckner-Gymnasium, Straubing
- Bavarian International School, Haimhausen
- Casimirianum, Coburg
- Feodor-Lynen-Gymnasium, Planegg
- Gymnasium Gars, Gars
- Gymnasium Wertingen, Wertingen
- International School Augsburg, Gersthofen
- Joseph-Bernhart-Gymnasium, Türkheim
- Landheim Schondorf, Schondorf am Ammersee
- Realschule Hirschaid, Hirschaid
- Rhabanus-Maurus-Gymnasium St. Ottilien, Eresing
- Schloss Hohenburg, Lenggries
- Spessart-Gymnasium, Alzenau
- Staatliches Landschulheim, Marquartstein
- Volksschule Altomünster, Altomünster
- Wallburg Realschule, Eltmann
- Wilhelm-Diess-Gymnasium, Pocking

=== Ansbach ===
- Gymnasium Carolinum

=== Augsburg ===
- Gymnasium bei St. Anna
- Holbein-Gymnasium

=== Erlangen ===
- Albert-Schweitzer-Gymnasium
- Franconian International School

=== Freising ===
- Josef-Hofmiller-Gymnasium

=== Ingolstadt ===
- Apian-Gymnasium

=== Munich ===
- European School, Munich
- Gisela Gymnasium
- Grundschule an der Herrnstraße
- Gymnasium München Nord
- Japanische Internationale Schule München
- Luitpold-Gymnasium
- Lycée Jean Renoir
- Maria-Theresia-Gymnasium
- Wilhelmsgymnasium

=== Schweinfurt ===
- Alexander-von-Humboldt-Gymnasium

=== Starnberg ===
- Munich International School

=== Würzburg ===
- Matthias-Grünewald-Gymnasium

== Berlin ==
- Archenhold School
- Berlin Brandenburg International School
- Berlin British School
- Berlin Cosmopolitan School
- Berlin Metropolitan School
- Canisius-Kolleg Berlin
- Evangelisches Gymnasium zum Grauen Kloster
- Französisches Gymnasium Berlin
- Japanische Internationale Schule zu Berlin
- John F. Kennedy School
- Lette-Verein
- Nelson Mandela School
- Russian Embassy School in Berlin

== Brandenburg ==
- Lise-Meitner-Gymnasium, Falkensee
- Lower Sorbian Gymnasium, Cottbus
- Montessori Oberschule Potsdam, Potsdam

== Bremen ==
- Hermann-Böse-Gymnasium
- International School of Bremen

== Hamburg ==
State schools

- Deutsch-Französisches
- Friedrich-Ebert-Gymnasium
- Gelehrtenschule des Johanneums
- Gymnasium Allee
- Gymnasium Christianeum
- Gymnasium Eppendorf
- Gymnasium Farmsen
- Gymnasium Hummelsbüttel
- Gymnasium Lerchenfeld
- Helene Lange Gymnasium
- Johanneum Gymnasium
- Lise-Meitner-Gymnasium
- Wilhelm-Gymnasium

Private schools

- École Française de Hambourg, a private school
- Neue Schule Hamburg, a private school
- Sankt-Ansgar-Schule, a Catholic Gymnasium

Others

- Schule Bullenhuser Damm

== Hessen ==
- Adolf-Reichwein-Gymnasium, Heusenstamm
- Christian-Wirth-Schule, Usingen
- Domgynasium, Fulda
- Edertalschule Frankenberg, Frankenberg
- Frankfurt International School, Oberursel
- Freie Waldorfschule Wetterau, Bad Nauheim
- Internatsschule Schloss Hansenberg, Geisenheim
- Philipp-Reis-Schule, Friedrichsdorf
- Schulzentrum Marienhöhe, Darmstadt
- State International School Seeheim, Seeheim

=== Bad Homburg vor der Höhe ===
- Humboldtschule
- Gesamtschule am Gluckenstein
- Kaiserin-Friedrich-Gymnasium
- Maria-Ward-Schule

=== Frankfurt ===
- Anna-Schmidt-Schule
- Bettinaschule
- European School, Frankfurt am Main
- Goethe-Gymnasium
- Heinrich-von-Gagern-Gymnasium
- Helene-Lange-Schule (Frankfurt am Main)
- ISF International School
- Japanische Internationale Schule Frankfurt
- Lessing-Gymnasium
- Lycée français Victor Hugo
- Musterschule
- Philanthropin

=== Kassel ===
- Friedrichsgymnasium Kassel

=== Marburg ===
- Elisabethschule Marburg
- Gymnasium Philippinum

=== Offenbach ===
- Albert Schweitzer School

=== Wiesbaden ===
- Helene-Lange-School
- Wiesbaden High School

== Lower Saxony ==
- Artland-Gymnasium, Quakenbrück
- Athenaeum Stade, Stade
- Gymnasium Carolinum, Osnabrück
- Gymnasium Hankensbüttel, Hankensbüttel
- Hölty-Gymnasium, Wunstorf
- Schulzentrum Saterland, Saterland
- Ubbo-Emmius-Gymnasium, Leer
- Werner-von-Siemens-Gymnasium, Bad Harzburg

=== Braunschweig ===
- Gymnasium Gaussschule

=== Buxtehude ===
- Halepaghen-Schule

=== Celle ===
- Hölty Gymnasium Celle

=== Gifhorn ===
- Humboldt Gymnasium
- Otto-Hahn-Gymnasium

=== Oldenburg ===
- Cäcilienschule Oldenburg
- Gymnasium Graf-Anton-Guenther School

== Mecklenburg-Vorpommern ==
- Friderico-Francisceum, Bad Doberan

== North Rhine-Westphalia ==
- CJD Christophorusschule, Königswinter
- Emsland Gymnasium, Rheine
- Goethe-Gymnasium, Dortmund
- Gymnasium Bayreuther Straße, Wuppertal
- Gymnasium Paulinum, Münster
- Gymnasium Petrinum, Dorsten
- Gymnasium Schwertstraße, Solingen
- Heilig-Geist-Gymnasium, Würselen
- Herder-Gymnasium, Minden
- Hüllhorst Comprehensive School, Hüllhorst
- Joseph-König-Gymnasium, Haltern am See
- Landfermann-Gymnasium, Duisburg
- Laborschule Bielefeld, Bielefeld
- St.-Pius-Gymnasium, Coesfeld
- Stadtgymnasium Detmold, Detmold
- Widukind-Gymnasium, Enger

=== Bergisch Gladbach ===
- Albertus-Magnus-Gymnasium
- Nicolaus-Cusanus-Gymnasium Bergisch Gladbach

=== Bochum ===
- Graf-Engelbert-Schule
- Hildegardis-Schule Bochum

=== Bonn ===
- Aloisiuskolleg
- Bertolt-Brecht-Gesamtschule
- Bonn International School
- École de Gaulle-Adenauer
- Independent Bonn International School
- Kardinal-Frings-Gymnasium
- Liebfrauenschule Bonn
- Nicolaus-Cusanus-Gymnasium Bonn
- Russian Consulate School in Bonn

=== Düsseldorf ===
- International School of Düsseldorf
- ISR Elementary School Düsseldorf
- Japanische Internationale Schule in Düsseldorf
- Lycée français de Düsseldorf
- Theodor-Fliedner-Gymnasium

=== Gelsenkirchen ===
- Gemeinschaftsgrundschule Im Brömm
- Gesamtschule Berger Feld

=== Kerpen ===
- Europagymnasium Kerpen
- Gymnasium der Stadt

=== Köln ===
- Dreikönigsgymnasium
- Hansagymnasium Köln
- Hildegard of Bingen Gymnasium
- Lessing-Gymnasium
- Rhein-Gymnasium
- Richard-Riemerschmid-Berufskolleg
- St. George's The British International School

=== Krefeld ===
- St.-Pius-Gymnasium

=== Menden ===
- Walburgisgymnasium

=== Neuss ===
- Alexander-von-Humboldt-Gymnasium

=== Paderborn ===
- Gymnasium Theodorianum

=== Wipperfürth ===
- Archbishop of St. Angela Gymnasium
- Engelbert-von-Berg Gymnasium

== Rhineland-Palatinate ==
- Are-Gymnasium, Bad Neuenahr-Ahrweiler
- Martinus-Gymnasium, Linz am Rhein
- Ramstein High School, Ramstein Air Base

=== Kaiserslautern ===
- Hohenstaufen-Gymnasium
- Kaiserslautern High School

=== Ludwigshafen am Rhein ===
- Geschwister-Scholl-Gymnasium
- Wirtschaftsgymnasium

=== Mainz ===
- Rabanus-Maurus-Gymnasium
- Theresianum Gymnasium

=== Saarbrücken ===
- Deutsch-Französisches Gymnasium

== Saxony ==
- Gymnasium St. Augustine, Grimma
- Johann-Wolfgang-von-Goethe-Gymnasium, Chemnitz
- Landesgymnasium St. Afra, Meißen
- Sorbian Gymnasium Bautzen, Bautzen

=== Dresden ===
- Dresden International School
- Kreuzschule
- Martin-Andersen-Nexö-Gymnasium

=== Leipzig ===
- Leipzig International School
- Thomasschule zu Leipzig

== Saxony-Anhalt ==
  - Georg Cantor Gymnasium (Halle/Saale)
  - Hans-Dietrich-Genscher-Gymnasium (Halle/Saale)
  - Landesschule Pforta (Schulpforte)

== Schleswig-Holstein ==
- A. P. Møller School, Schleswig
- Erich Kästner Gemeinschaftsschule, Elmshorn
- Japanische Schule in Hamburg, Halstenbek
- Meldorfer Gelehrtenschule, Meldorf
- Stiftung Louisenlund, Güby

=== Flensburg ===
- Duborg-Skolen
- Jaruplund Højskole

=== Husum ===
- Hermann-Tast-Schule

=== Lübeck ===
- Katharineum
- Oberschule zum Dom

== Thuringia ==
- Carl-Zeiss-Gymnasium, Jena
- Ernestine Gymnasium, Gotha
- Gutenberg-Gymnasium, Erfurt
- Hennebergisches Gymnasium "Georg Ernst", Schleusingen
- Schnepfenthal Salzmann School, Waltershausen
- Wilhelm-Ernst-Gymnasium, Weimar

== See also ==
- Education in Germany
- Gymnasium (Germany)
- Gymnasium (school)
