= List of scientific gymnasiums =

This list includes scientific gymnasiums (gymnasiums [schools]/ grammar schools specialising in sciences). In German-speaking countries, scientific gymnasiums are defined as schools where pupils study a maximum of two foreign languages in junior secondary school, but focus on sciences. Often the same school also offers different education, such as the education of a classical grammar school/classical lyceum or a linguistic lyceum. In Germany a scientific gymnasium is called mathematisch-naturwissenschaftliches Gymnasium and in Italy liceo scientifico.

== Austria ==
=== Burgenland ===
- Bundesgymnasium und Bundesrealgymnasium Mattersburg
- Bundesgymnasium Oberschützen

=== Carinthia ===
- BG/BRG Villach St. Martin
- Bundesrealgymnasium Klagenfurt-Viktring

=== Lower Austria ===
(sorted by location}

- Bundesgymnasium und Bundesrealgymnasium Amstetten
- BG und BRG Baden Frauengasse
- Bundesgymnasium und Bundesrealgymnasium Hollabrunn
- Bundesgymnasium, Bundesrealgymnasium und Bundesaufbaugymnasium Horn
- Bundesgymnasium und Bundesrealgymnasium Klosterneuburg
- Bundesrealgymnasium Krems
- Mary Ward Privat-Oberstufenrealgymnasium Krems
- Bundesoberstufenrealgymnasium Mistelbach
- Bundesgymnasium und Bundesrealgymnasium Keimgasse Mödling
- BG Bachgasse Mödling
- Bundesoberstufenrealgymnasium Neulengbach
- Bundesgymnasium und Bundesrealgymnasium Perchtoldsdorf
- Gymnasium und Realgymnasium Sachsenbrunn
- Bundesoberstufenrealgymnasium Ternitz
- Bundesgymnasium und Bundesrealgymnasium Tulln
- Bundesgymnasium und Bundesrealgymnasium Waidhofen an der Thaya
- Bundesrealgymnasium Gröhrmühlgasse, Wiener Neustadt
- BORG Wiener Neustadt

=== Salzburg ===
- Christian-Doppler-Gymnasium und Realgymnasium
- Bundesgymnasium und Bundesrealgymnasium Hallein
- Bundesgymnasium und Sportrealgymnasium HIB Saalfelden
- Bundesrealgymnasium Salzburg

=== Styria ===
- BORG Bad Aussee
- Bundesgymnasium und Bundesrealgymnasium Carnerigasse
- Gymnasium Hartberg
- Bundesgymnasium und Bundesrealgymnasium Kirchengasse Graz
- BG/BRG/BORG Köflach
- Bundesgymnasium und Bundesrealgymnasium Lichtenfels
- Bundesgymnasium und Bundesrealgymnasium Pestalozzi
- Bundesrealgymnasium Petersgasse
- Bundesgymnasium und Bundesrealgymnasium Seebacher
- Bundesgymnasium und Bundesrealgymnasium Stainach
- Bundesrealgymnasium Keplerstrasse

=== Tirol ===
- BORG Innsbruck
- Bundesrealgymnasium Kepler
- Bundesrealgymnasium Petersgasse
- Bundesrealgymnasium Imst
- Bundesrealgymnasium Innsbruck
- Bundesgymnasium und Bundesrealgymnasium Kufstein
- Bundesgymnasium_und_Bundesrealgymnasium_Lienz
- Meinhardinum Stams
- Bundesgymnasium und Bundesrealgymnasium Sillgasse
- Bundesgymnasium und Bundesoberstufenrealgymnasium St. Johann in Tirol

=== Upper Austria ===
- Adalbert-Stifter-Gymnasium (Linz)
- Bundesgymnasium und Bundesrealgymnasium Braunau am Inn
- Bundesgymnasium und Bundesrealgymnasium Freistadt
- Bundesrealgymnasium Landwiedstraße
- Realgymnasium des Schulvereines am Benediktinerstift Lambach
- Bundesgymnasium und Bundesrealgymnasium Linz, Ramsauerstraße
- Bundesrealgymnasium Schloss Traunsee
- Bundesrealgymnasium Schloss Wagrain
- Georg-von-Peuerbach-Gymnasium
- BRG/BORG Kirchdorf
- BORG Linz
- Bundesrealgymnasium Traun
- Bundesrealgymnasium Wels Wallererstraße

=== Vienna ===
- Bundesrealgymnasium Marchettigasse
- BGRG 8 Albertgasse
- Erich Fried Realgymnasium
- GRG 12 Erlgasse
- Realgymnasium und Wirtschaftskundliches Realgymnasium Feldgasse
- Bundesgymnasium und Bundesrealgymnasium Franklinstraße 21
- Joseph-Haydn-Realgymnasium
- Gymnasium Kundmanngasse
- Bundesrealgymnasium Lessinggasse
- BRG 14 Linzer Straße
- Gymnasium Radetzkystraße
- GRG 6 Rahlgasse
- GRG 12 Rosasgasse
- Schopenhauer Realgymnasium
- Realgymnasium Schottenbastei
- Bundesrealgymnasium Schuhmeierplatz
- Bundesrealgymnasium Lessinggasse
- Gymnasium am Augarten
- GRG 21 Ödenburger Straße
- Rainergymnasium
- Bundesgymnasium Zirkusgasse

=== Vorarlberg ===
- Bundesrealgymnasium und Bundesoberstufenrealgymnasium Dornbirn-Schoren
- Bundesgymnasium und Bundesrealgymnasium Feldkirch
- Gymnasium Schillerstraße
- BORG Götzis

== China ==
- Guangdong Experimental High School

== Germany ==
=== Baden-Württemberg ===
- Helmholtz-Gymnasium Heidelberg
- Wirtemberg-Gymnasium Stuttgart-Untertürkheim
- Matthias-Grünewald-Gymnasium Tauberbischofsheim

=== Bavaria ===
- Gertrud-von-le-Fort-Gymnasium Oberstdorf

=== Berlin ===
- Europäisches Gymnasium Bertha-von-Suttner

=== Mecklenburg-Western Pomerania ===
- Europaschule Deutsch-Polnisches Gymnasium Löcknitz

=== North Rhine Westphalia ===
- Besselgymnasium Minden
- Comenius-Gymnasium Düsseldorf
- Europagymnasium Kerpen
- Europaschule Marie-Curie-Gymnasium Neuss
- Goethe-Gymnasium (Dortmund)
- Helmholtz-Gymnasium Essen
- Landrat-Lucas-Gymnasium, Leverkusen
- Märkisches Gymnasium Wattenscheid

=== Rhineland Palatinate ===
- Heinrich-Heine-Gymnasium (Kaiserslautern)

== Italy ==
=== Südtirol/Alto Adige ===
- Nicolaus Cusanus Sprachen- und Realgymnasium, Bruneck/Brunico

== Switzerland ==
=== Zürich ===
- Mathematisch-Naturwissenschaftliches Gymnasium Rämibühl

== Turkey ==
- Istanbul Erkek Lisesi

== United States ==
- Castilleja School
- The Thacher School
- The College Preparatory School
