= Helene-Lange-Schule =

Helene-Lange-Schule may refer to:

- Helene-Lange-Schule (Frankfurt), a modern language gymnasium school in Frankfurt am Main, Germany
- Helene-Lange-School (Wiesbaden), a comprehensive school in Wiesbaden, Germany
