= SZS =

SZS may refer to:

== Places ==
- Schulzentrum Saterland, general education day school in Lower Saxony, Germany
- Shizuoka City, Shizuoka Prefecture (静岡 or SZS) location code used in vehicle registration plates of Japan
- Southern Zone Sea, sea in the southernmost part of South America
- Ryan's Creek Aerodrome, airstrip in Stewart Island, New Zealand (IATA: SZS)

== Politics ==
- Alliance for Serbia (Serbian: Савез за Србију), political coalition in Serbia
- Slovak Green Party (Slovak: Strana zelených Slovenska), environmentalist political party in Slovakia

== Anime and manga ==
- Sayonara, Zetsubou-Sensei, 2005–2012 Japanese manga series
- Senki Zesshō Symphogear, 2012 Japanese anime

== Other ==
- Scandinavian Airlines Ireland (ICAO callsign: SZS)
- Solomon Islands Sign Language (ISO 639-3: szs)

== See also ==
- Sz (disambiguation)
