= St.-Pius-Gymnasium =

Secondary school in Germany

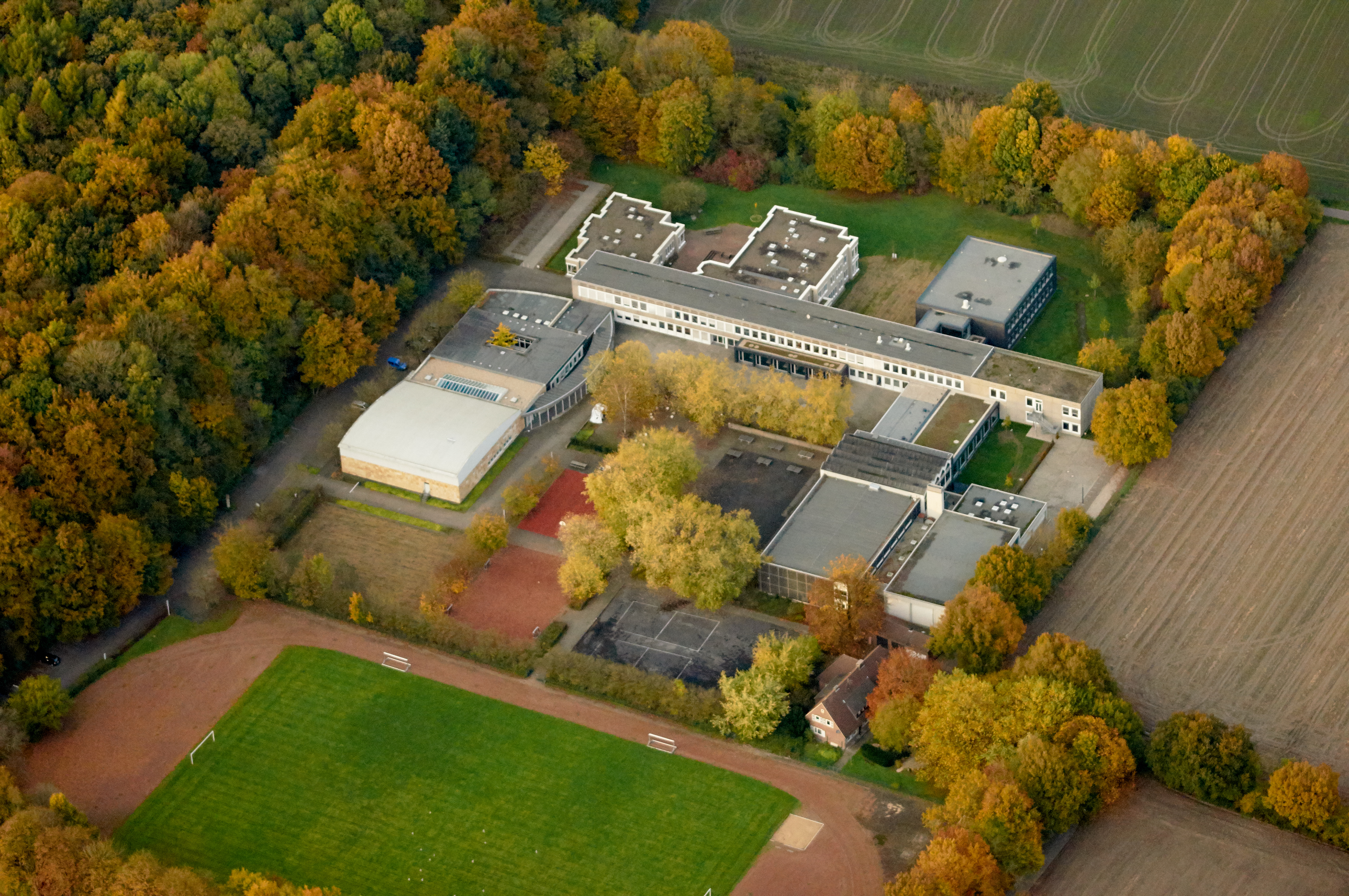

Location
- Gerlever Weg; Coesfeld, 48653; Germany
- Coordinates: 51°56′32″N 7°11′02″E

Information
- Type: Private Gymnasium school
- Religious affiliation: Catholicism
- Patron saint: Pope Pius X
- Established: 1953; 73 years ago
- Founder: Bishop Michael Keller
- Director: Dr. Norbert Just
- Faculty: 52
- Gender: Boys (1953-1968); Co-educational (since 1969)
- Enrolment: 791
- Website: www.piuscoe.de

St.-Pius-Gymnasium is a private Catholic Gymnasium located in Coesfeld near Münster, Germany. As of 2023, the school had approximately 700 pupils.

It is named after Pope Pius X. The school is associated with the Lycée Notre-Dame in Guingamp, Brittany, France and a high school in Poole, Yorkshire, England.

The school has its own chapel and an auditorium. The whole school is a non-smoking area.

== History ==
It was founded in 1953 by Bishop Michael Keller as an Internat (all-boys boarding school), in order to educate about 100 students for the priesthood. It had a fee of 100 Marks.

In April 1964 it was changed to a high school. In 1965 the school building at Gerlever Weg was built. Girls were admitted starting in 1969, and in the same year a building was erected for up to 300 students. In 1976 it became a Gymnasium. In 1979, the last of the boarding students left, and the following year a major expansion to the buildings was made.

In 1995, the architect Josef Paul Kleihues designed an extension to the building which included a music room.

== See also ==
- Education in Germany
- List of schools in Germany
- Catholic Church in Germany
