= Gymnasium Gaussschule =

School in Lower Saxony, Germany

Coordinates: 52°15′40″N 10°31′50″E

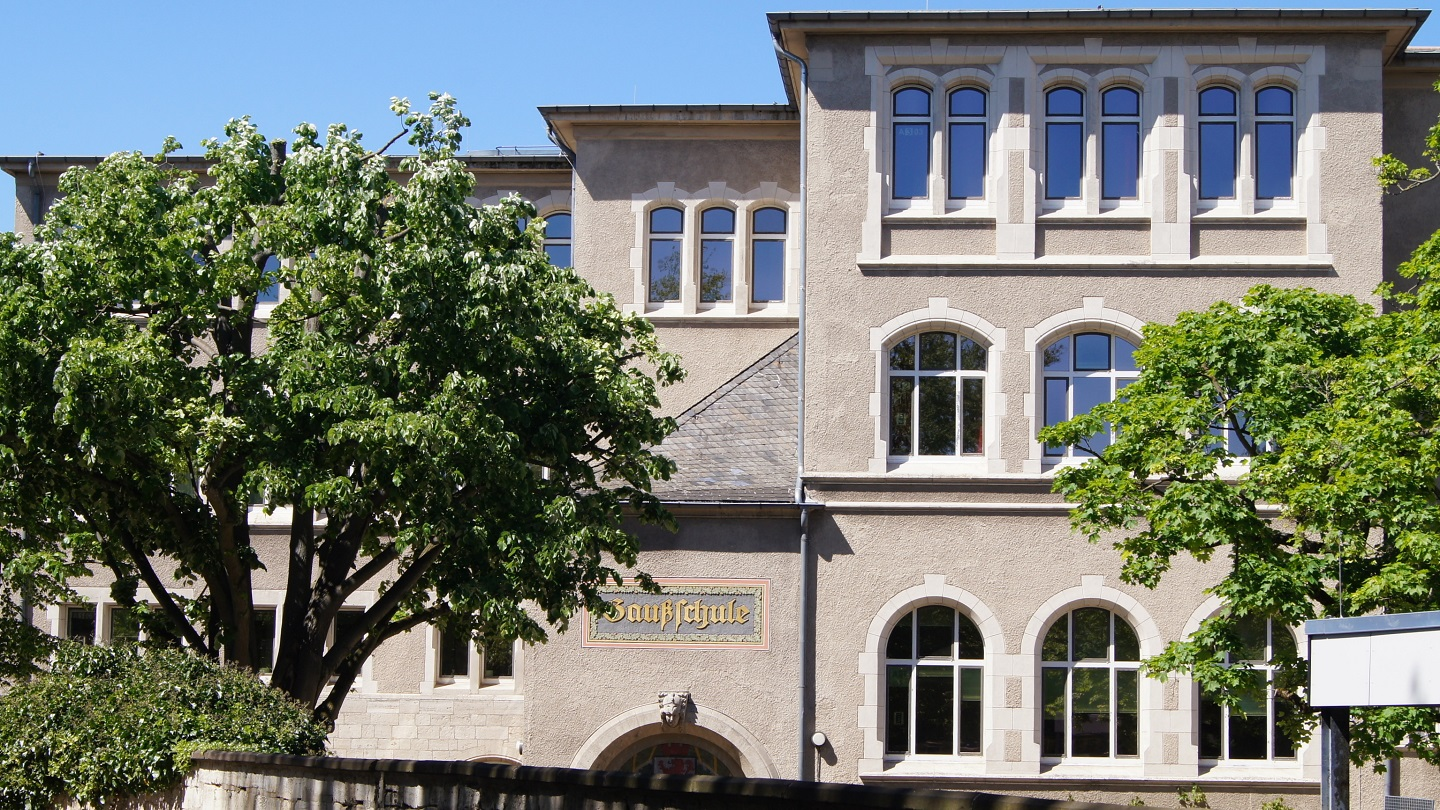
- Old part of Gaussschule
- Braunschweig, Lower Saxony, Germany

Information
- Type: Gymnasium
- Established: 1909; 117 years ago
- Website: School Website (in German)

Gymnasium Gaussschule is a Gymnasium (high school) in Braunschweig, Lower Saxony, Germany.

== History ==
The school was founded in 1909. From 1933 to 1944 the number of students dropped from 415 to 244, under pressure from the Nazi regime. In 2005, a planetarium was opened in the school.

== Notable alumni and teachers ==
- Theodor Stiebel, founder of Stiebel Eltron
- Hans Jäcker was teaching Latin and sports after his career as football player
- Günter Gaus Journalist-Diplomat

== See also ==
- List of schools in Germany
