= Hohenstaufen-Gymnasium =

Bilingual grammar school in Germany

Coordinates: 48.70446°N 9.66837°E

Location
- 39 Hohenstaufenstraße, Göppingen, BW 73033

Information
- Other name: HoGy
- Type: Bilingual Grammar School
- Established: 1397; 629 years ago
- Principal: OStD' John Ahlskog
- Teaching staff: 55
- Years offered: 5-12
- Enrollment: 628 (2017-18)
- Mascot: Bee
- Newspaper: HOGY Times
- Website: hogy-gp.de

The Hohenstaufen-Gymnasium is a bilingual Gymnasium (grammar school) in Göppingen, Germany.

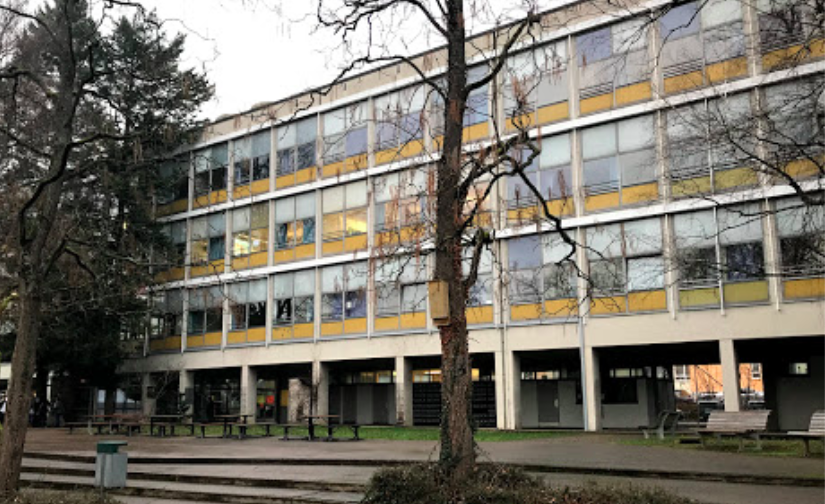
Hohenstaufen-Gymnasium Göppingen

== Campus ==
The two main buildings of the Hohenstaufen-Gymnasium were designed by the architect Günter Behnisch and are now under monumental protection (Denkmalschutz).

The three main buildings are connected via four glazed bridges.

The north building houses the administrative offices (offices of the headmistress, deputy headmistress, secretariat, teachers' offices and lounge, conference rooms), class rooms, library, art halls, art work station rooms, geography hall, music hall, student's lounge and Senior's lounge. Beyond this, the full-day care for students in years 5 through 7 takes place here, during afternoon classes.

The south or science building accommodates rooms and halls for theoretical and experimental education in chemistry, physics and biology and natural science. It also houses several preparation rooms and an extra class room.

The campus of the school also offers multi-usage sports field, gymnasium, dining hall and indoor pool.

The premises of the near Youth Centre (Haus der Jugend) may also be used on occasion.

== School-leaving qualifications ==
Dependent on elective classes and courses, students may attain the following qualifications after year 12:

- Abitur Baden-Württemberg
- Internationales Abitur Baden-Württemberg
- Bilingual Abitur Baden-Württemberg

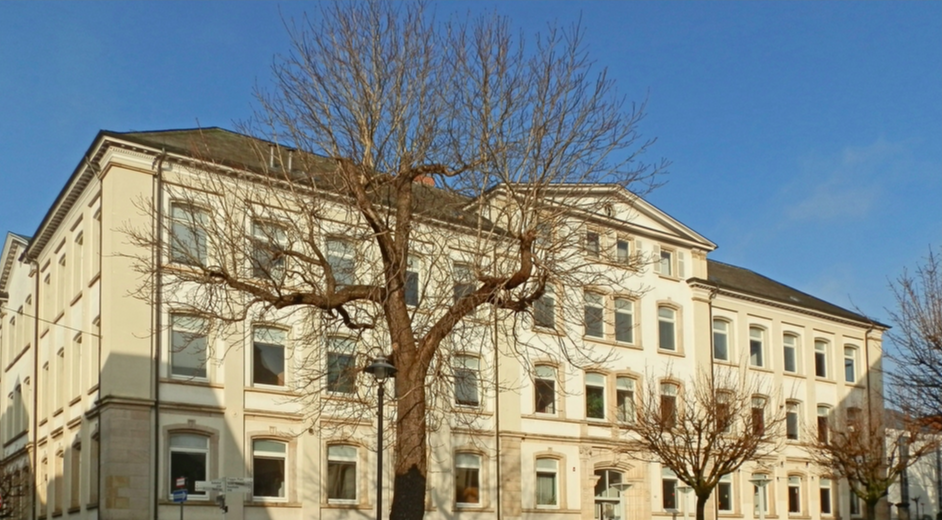
Freihof-Gymnasium: main building of the Hohenstaufen-Gymnasium until 1959

Beyond these university entrance qualifications, students may - according to state law - attain lower qualifications in year 9 (Hauptschulabschluss), year 10 (mittlere Reife) and year 11 (Fachhochschulreife).

== Clubs ==
=== Sports ===
The school has teams for the 'Youth Training for the Olympics' contest (fencing, tennis, swimming, soccer etc.) and offers extra-curricular training in track and field athletics, swimming, gymnastics, soccer, table tennis and unicycling.

=== Music ===
The Hohenstaufen-Gymnasium has its own Youth Choir, Chamber Choir and String Players Club.

=== Social ===
The grammar school has teams for the national debating, FIRST LEGO League, young scientists competitions.

Furthermore a EU-club has been evolving, which helped the HoGy become an Ambassador school of the European parliament and students attending the club frequently attend Erasmus+ events.

It also has beekeeping, coding, paramedics, typing education, theater, school paper, lounging, meditation/worship and homework clubs.

=== Languages ===
The HoGy has an Italian club which provides interested students with basic Italian knowledge, it is to be noted that no official language certificate is currently offered to students attending the club.

== Awards ==
The school has been awarded the titles of:

- Botschafterschule für das Europäische Parlament (Ambassador school of the European parliament)
- Fairtrade School
- STEM-friendly School
- Among The Most Valuable Preparation Centres (Cambridge University Assessment English)

== Notable alumni ==
- Jochen Stutzky - Soccer commentator and TV host
- Horst Kern - Professor and former Dean at the Leibniz University Hannover
- Dieter Hundt - business man and former member of the board of VfB Stuttgart
- Ulrich Klieber - artist and recipient of the Federal Museum of Germany Award
- Hans-Jochen Kleineidam - Professor at the Federal Military University for economics
- Karl Hinderer - Mathematician at the Universities of Hamburg, Karlsruhe and Dresden
- Dr. Matthias Dannemann - Chief Executive Priest in Bad Waldsee

== Hohenstaufen-Gymnasium Foundation ==
The school foundation (officially: Verein der Förderer und Freunde des Hohenstaufen-Gymnasiums e.V.) is a separate private entity operating to assist the school board in funding projects.

Among other projects funded by the foundation are a sculpture by Fritz Nuss, the canteen and dining hall, computers, IT equipment for all class rooms and water fountains in the main building and dining hall.
