= Lise-Meitner-Gymnasium =

Coordinates: 53.5737°N 9.8556°E

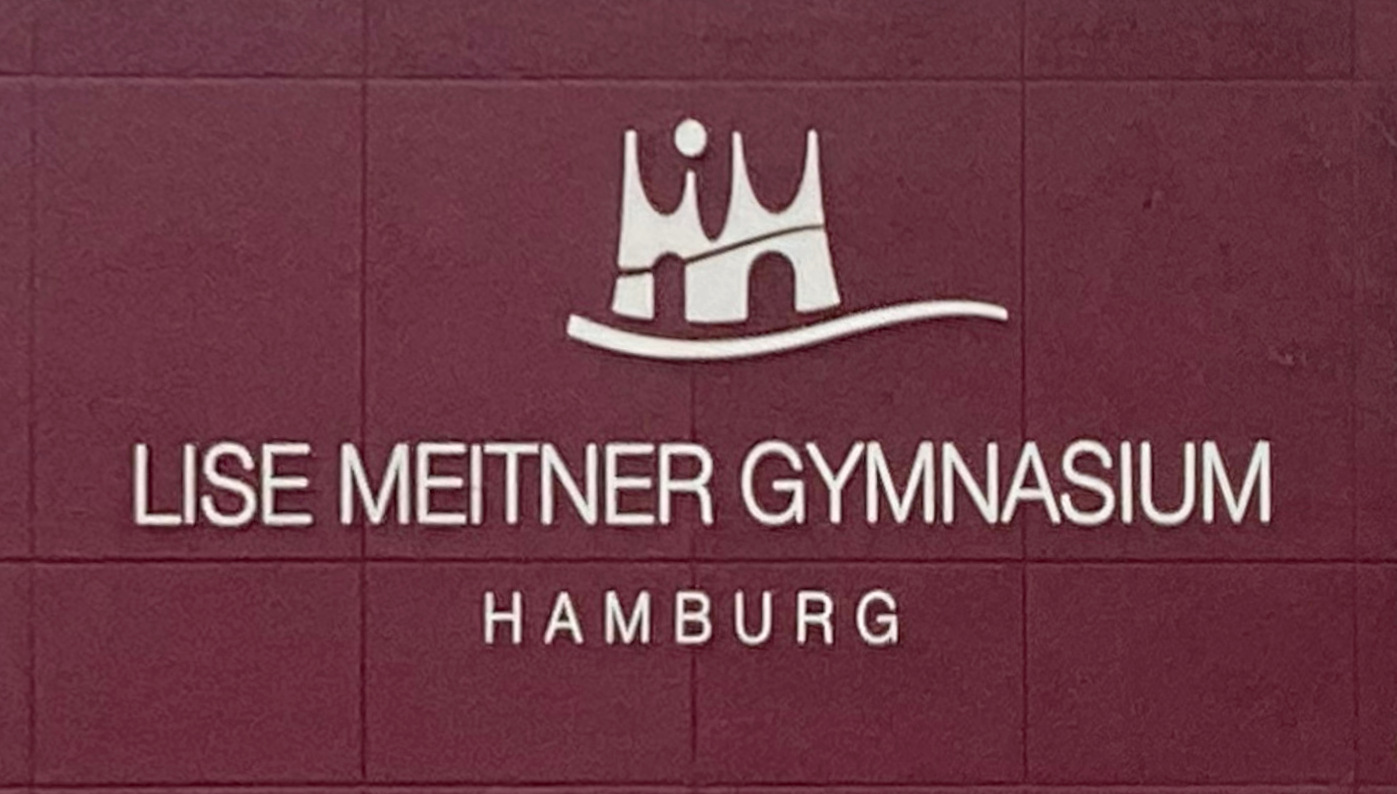
Lise-Meitner-Gymnasium

The Lise-Meitner-Gymnasium (LMG) is a high school in Osdorf, Hamburg. It bore the name Gymnasium Osdorf until 1 January 2007, when it officially adopted the name of the Austrian-Swedish nuclear physicist Lise Meitner.

== History ==
The founding of the Gymnasium took place on 1 April 1970. At that time, the lessons were not yet held in today's classrooms, but in those of today's Realschule Goosacker. For the school year 1971/1972 only three classes remained at Goosacker, the other six moved into the rooms on the Hemmingstedter Weg, where today the ZSU (Center for School Biology and Environmental Education) is located. At this time, the school without a strong base already had 216 students. The new building at the street of Knabeweg, where the school is located today, was inaugurated on 5 February 1973. At the beginning of the new school year, however, lack of space prevailed on the site, which consisted of only one H-building, in which the majority of students is still located today. Due to the lack of space, some classes had to move back into the ZSU. The lack of space was corrected in 1974, when a building for the students of the upper school (December), and a specialist building (April) were completed.

The construction of the administrative building of the school was completed in May 1976. Since 1976, members of the 10th grade travel to Margate every year for about one and a half weeks.

In 1981, a large sports hall was completed, which is often rented by clubs over the weekend for tournaments. The hall can be divided into three parts, which allows three classes at the same time to exercise in a school lesson. Since the sports hall is largely powered by solar energy and the environment working group pays attention to the cleanliness and the environmental protection on the grounds, the school was awarded several times as "Environmental School in Europe" by the Foundation for Environmental Education.

In 1995, the school administration celebrated its 25th anniversary together with representatives of the partner schools. In 1998, 1999, 2001 and 2003, the school took school trips just before the summer holidays. In 2001, the event of the "Aulalauf" took place for the first time. The run was supposed to collect donations so that the school could start building an assembly hall, as the break room had become too small for official occasions.

2004/2005 the school was nearing its end: A plan was announced by the Hamburg Education Authority after which the Gymnasium Osdorf, the junior high school Goosacker and the primary school Wesperloh should merge as a "school network Hamburg-West". The conversion to a comprehensive school could only be averted by strong protest from students, school management and parents. However, since the school year 2005/2006 several school classes from Goosacker are located at Lise-Meitner-Gymnasium and the school management has been partially merged. The project of the construction of a new assembly hall was discontinued in 2006, through an arrangement with the education authority, the school gets by grants the remaining money for the construction. On 1 January 2007, the final renaming of Gymnasium Osdorf in Lise-Meitner-Gymnasium took place. The high school bears an intensified mathematical-scientific profile. On 23 January 2018, German Federal President Frank-Walter Steinmeier visited the school and held a discussion with higher grade pupils.

== Partnership schools ==
- Léon, Nicaragua, since 1974
- Lyakirimu, Tanzania, since 1989
- Moscow, Russia, since 1992

In the partnership with the Lyakirimu Secondary School, Tanzania, there has been a lively exchange between the two schools. The Lise-Meitner-Gymnasium actively supports the school in the East African state with donations, from which the school bought a truck among other things. In addition, the school organizes a bazaar every two years, the proceeds go to the partner school.

== Notable alumni ==
- Norbert Bohnsack, founder of musical group Norbert und die Feiglinge
- Karsten Brüggemann, German historian of the Tallinn University (Estonia)
- Tim Petersen, football player of VfB Oldenburg
- Frederik Timm, member of musical group Norbert und die Feiglinge
- Joja Wendt, jazz pianist and composer
