= Gemeinschaftsgrundschule Im Brömm =

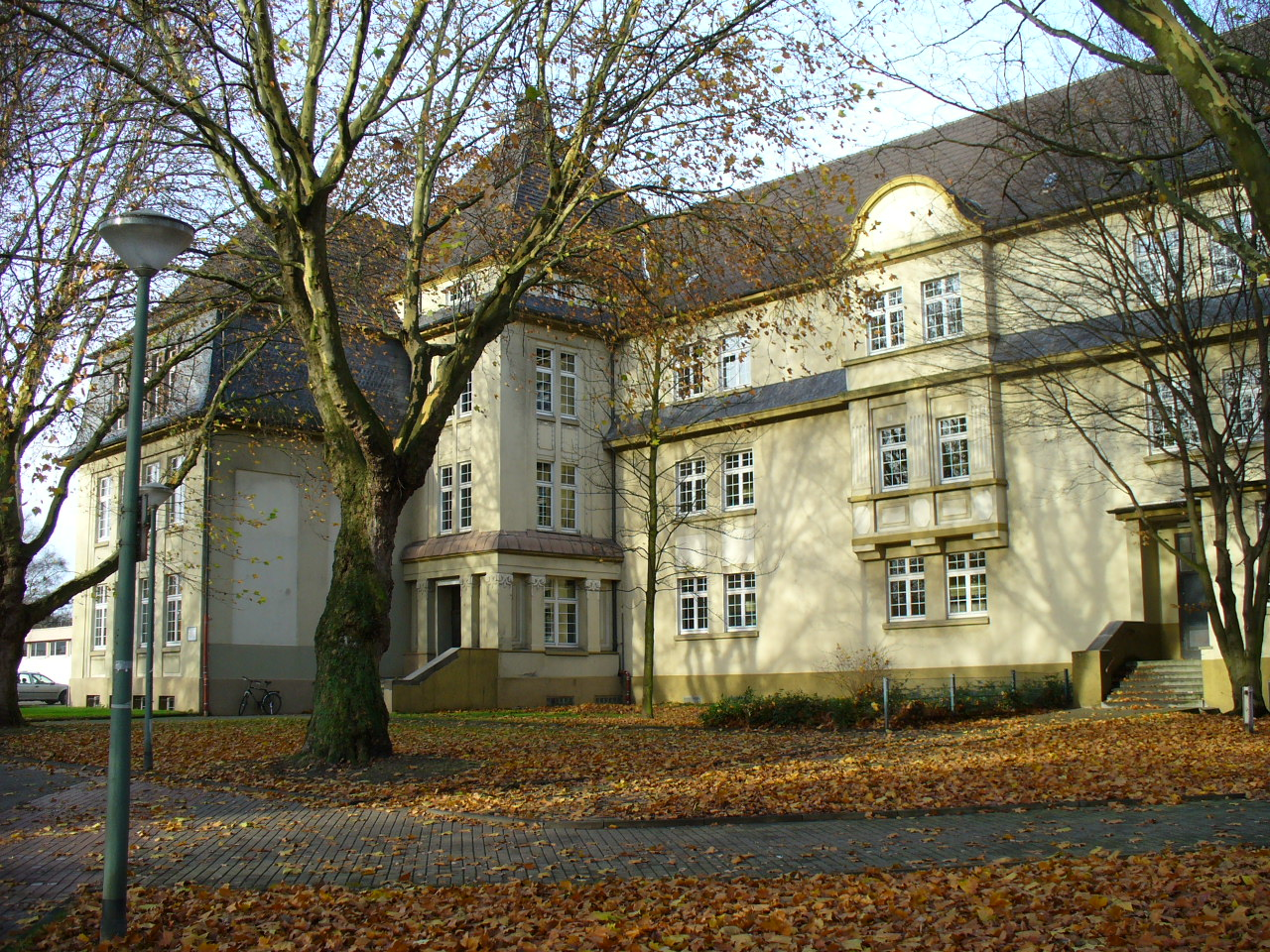
- Building front-side

Location
- Im Brömm 6; 45896 Gelsenkirchen-Scholven; Gelsenkirchen, North Rhine-Westphalia; Germany
- Coordinates: 51°35′30.48″N 7°1′10.13″E

Information
- School type: Public Grundschule
- Founded: 1913
- School number: 119271
- Head of school: Rüdiger Schrade-Tönnißen
- Teaching staff: 11
- Grades: 1-4
- Gender: Coeducational
- Age: 6 to 11
- Classes: 8
- Average class size: 25
- Website: www.ggs-im-broemm.de

The Gemeinschaftsgrundschule Im Brömm is a primary school in Gelsenkirchen, North Rhine-Westphalia, Germany.

The school was built in 1913 as Katholische Volksschule – Josefschule. After having been destroyed in World War II the school was rebuilt in the 1950s. In 1963 the school got a gym and an indoor pool. On the schoolyard was built a mini-soccerfield in the year 2008.
