= International School of Stuttgart =

International School Stuttgart
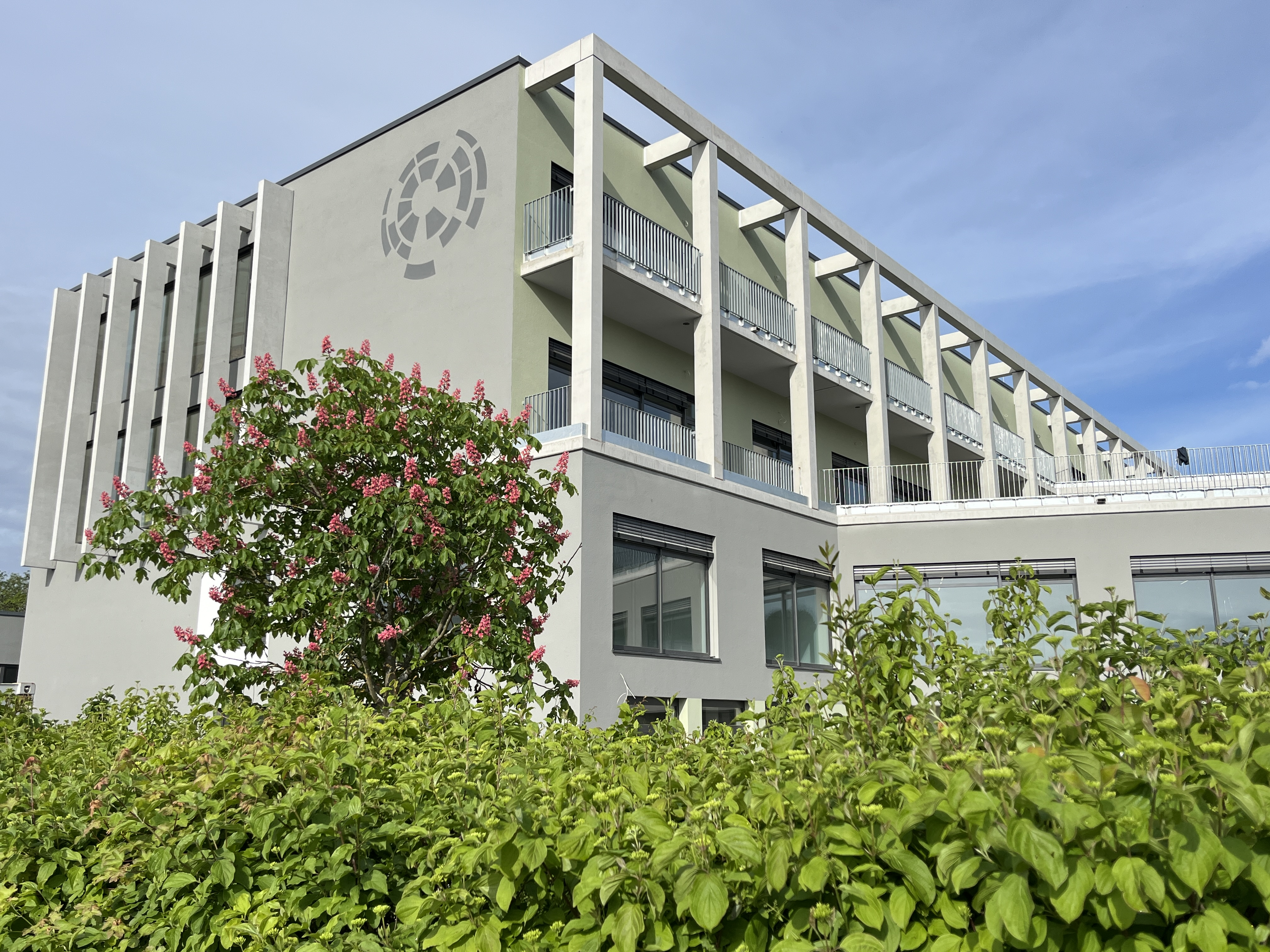
- Stuttgart, Baden-Württemberg; Germany

Information
- Type: Private, International school
- Motto: Learning at the core of all that we do/ Inspire, Challenge, Support
- Established: 1985
- Director: Andrew Hancock
- Faculty: 240
- Grades: Early Years (age 3) - Grade 12
- Enrollment: 915 (2024)
- Campus: 2
- Mascot: Stallion
- Accreditation: ECIS, NEASC, IBO
- Affiliation: None
- Website: www.issev.de

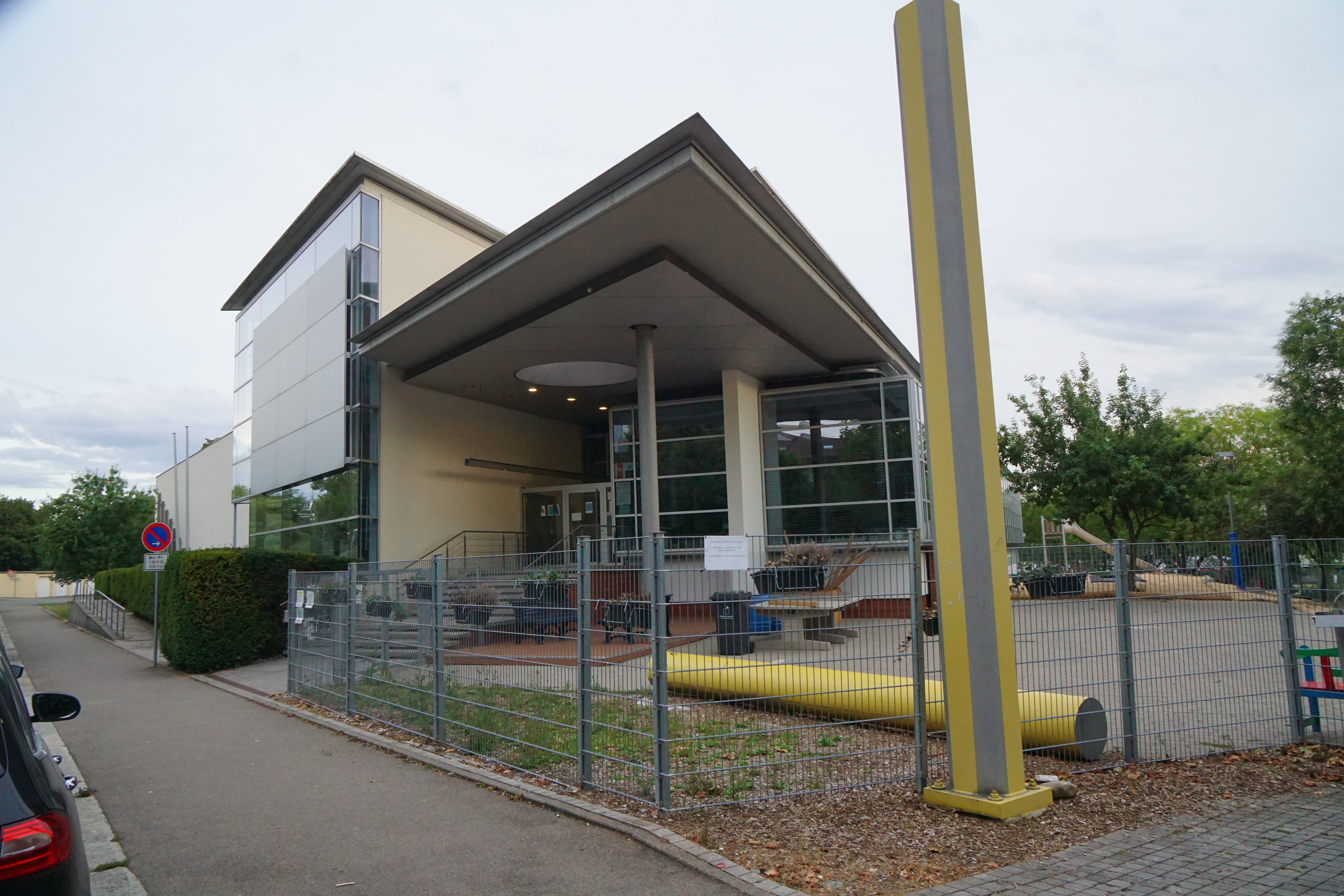
Campus of Sindelfingen

The International School of Stuttgart (ISS) operates from Kindergarten through grade 12 on campuses in the Degerloch (main and original campus) and Sindelfingen areas of Stuttgart organized on the International Baccalaureate program. The school is home to a co-educational, multi-cultural student body of over 900 students from over 45 countries.

== History ==
=== Degerloch Campus ===
ISS was founded in 1985. The school's first and main campus is located in Degerloch, Stuttgart, Germany. Serving students from 3 years old to 18 years old, Early Years through 12th grade, it is easily accessible by public transport and is just 15 minutes outside the Stuttgart city center.

The Degerloch campus is composed of three buildings. The Early Years “Nest” area, for children aged 3 - Kindergarten, is at one end of the campus and features bright classrooms organized through a Reggio Emilia pedagogical approach, a dedicated playground with student-maintained gardens, and a covered area that emphasises outdoor learning and play. Grade 1 & 2 classrooms have direct access to a larger playground, and all other well-provisioned classrooms have access to a cafeteria, a rooftop library, and multiple smaller learning spaces utilized for specialized learning in Music, Art, and Languages. There is a gym dedicated to Lower School students.

The Upper School, for grades 6-12, consists of two buildings, featuring cluster organized classroom facilities, an upper school sports gymnasium, state of the art Science laboratories, Music rooms, Art and Design / Technology rooms, a library and flexible dining areas. All classrooms are well provisioned with technology tools.

=== Sindelfingen Campus ===
The Sindelfingen campus, was opened in 2003 and caters to students from the Early Years to grade 10. Students are taught in mixed age groups, primarily in the Early Years and Primary school and in select classes in the Middle Years.

The Sindelfingen campus offers an intralingual environment, with students being co-taught in both German and English, catering to a more local context. Authorized by the International Baccalaureate Organanization (IBO), the Sindelfingen campus offers the IB Primary Years Programme (PYP) and the IB Middle Years Programme (MYP).

=== New building on Degerloch Campus ===
ISS Degerloch Campus has recently gone through some changes. The school's main building was demolished during the summer of 2021 to build a new building. The new building opened for classes at the end of August 2024. With Science Technology, Engineering, Arts and Mathematics (STEAM) at the core of education, the facility provides: expanded state of the art science facilities; expanded and improved Design Makerspaces for engineering exploration; expanded and improved Performance and Visual Arts facilities to celebrate creativity; collaborative educational spaces that exchanges the traditional classroom space for a variety of learning environments that supports clustered and personalized learning; a full service kitchen with a variety of healthy food stations throughout the building and serving both campus daily. In addition, the building was environmentally friendly constructed with an advanced sustainable solar and heat pump resource solution as well as open spaces and terraces that encourage learning in the fresh air.

== Curriculum and accreditation ==
The International School of Stuttgart is approved and accredited by the European Council of International Schools and the New England Association of Schools and Colleges, and recognized by the state government of Baden-Württemberg. ISS is a member of the Association of German International Schools and the Council of International Schools.

The Degerloch campus is authorized by the International Baccalaureate Organization (IB) to offer the Primary Years Programme (PYP), Middle Years Programme (MYP) and Diploma Programme (DP), thus making it one of a select group of IB World Schools offering three continuous programs.

The Sindelfingen offers an intralingual environment, with students being taught in both German and English and catering to a more local context. The IB Programme is introduced from grade 6 onwards. The campus offers the International Baccalaureate, Primary Years Program in Early Years and Grades 1-5, and the Middle Years Program (MYP) in Grades 6-10.
