= Gymnasium Remchingen =

Secondary school in Remchingen, Germany

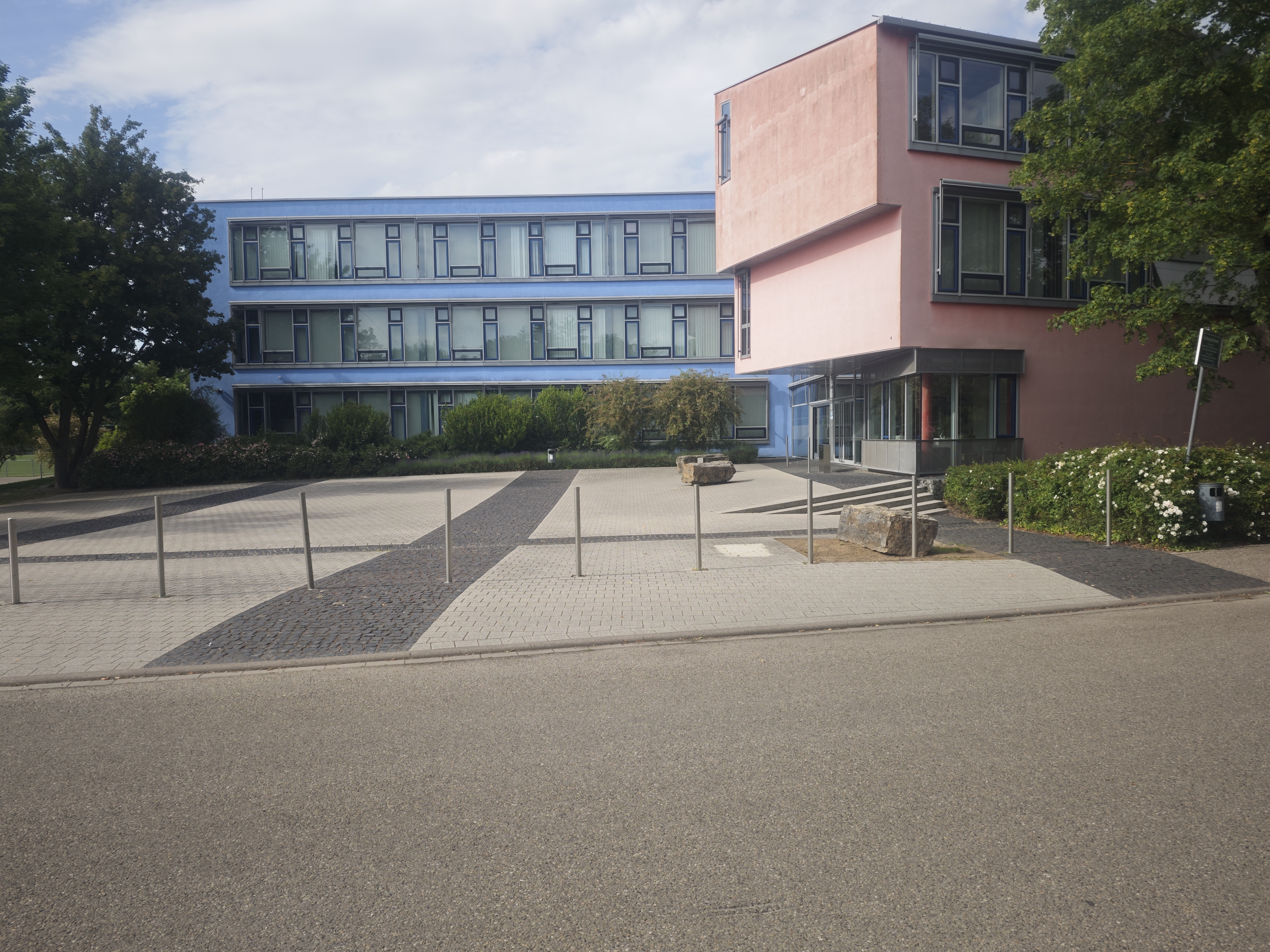
- Photo 2026

Location
- Dajastraße 21; Remchingen, Enz district, Baden-Württemberg 75196; Germany
- Coordinates: 48°57′17.1″N 8°34′33.2″E

Information
- Type: Gymnasium
- Established: 2003
- Principal: Sandra Brenner
- Staff: 46
- Gender: Coeducational
- Enrollment: 470
- Language: German
- Campus type: Suburban
- Colors: Blue, red, yellow
- Website: gym-remchingen.de

The Gymnasium Remchingen is a public secondary school (Gymnasium) located in the municipality of Remchingen, Enz district, in Baden-Württemberg, Germany. The school operates under the G8 system, where students graduate with the Abitur after 12 years of education. Founded in 2003, Gymnasium Remchingen serves Remchingen and the surrounding area including the municipalities Pfinztal and Keltern.

== History and architecture ==
Gymnasium Remchingen was established in the academic year 2003/2004 to meet the growing demand for secondary education in the northwestern Enz district and eastern Karlsruhe district. Initially, classes were held in the Carl-Dittler-Realschule before the school moved in September 2004 to its newly built campus.

The distinct building features a 14-sided layout with a central assembly hall visible from all three floors. Both exterior and interior design consistently use primary colors, blue, red, and yellow, making the school architecturally unique. Large windows provide abundant daylight, especially in the main hall which extends across three stories.

Facilities include a cafeteria and a school library. A triple sports hall, situated directly opposite the school and used by both the school and local sports clubs, is part of the campus. Swimming classes are conducted at the nearby municipal indoor pool. The campus features two playgrounds with a basketball court, table tennis tables, seating areas, and a pond with a meadow. The design anticipates easy future expansion.

== Academic profile ==
Students can choose between multiple language-based and science-oriented tracks. Foreign languages offered include English, French, Spanish, and Latin. In upper grades, students select academic profiles according to their interests.

== Awards and Distinctions ==
Gymnasium Remchingen has received several recognitions:

- Digitale Schule (Digital School)
- MINT-friendly School (special focus on STEM)
- stark.stärker.WIR-School (emphasizing social cohesion)
- BoriS vocational orientation award
- Sports and physical education emphasis

== Curriculum and Student Life ==
The school offers:

- Sequence of foreign languages (English, French, Spanish, Latin)
- Upper-level specialization
- Extensive support and guidance (school social work, counseling, prevention curriculum, career orientation, guidance for upper grades)
- Homework supervision and extracurricular clubs (AGs)
- Projects such as Girls’ Digital Camp, game mentor programs, and media literacy workshops
- The school has a friendship with the King's Ely in England

== Students and staff ==
Gymnasium Remchingen educates around 470 students from Remchingen and neighboring municipalities such as Pfinztal and Keltern. The teaching staff comprises 46 teachers and four members of the administration.

== Leadership ==
- 2003–2016: Rudolf Reisinger
- Since 2016: Sandra Brenner
