= Berlin Metropolitan School =

Coordinates: 52.5268°N 13.3902°E

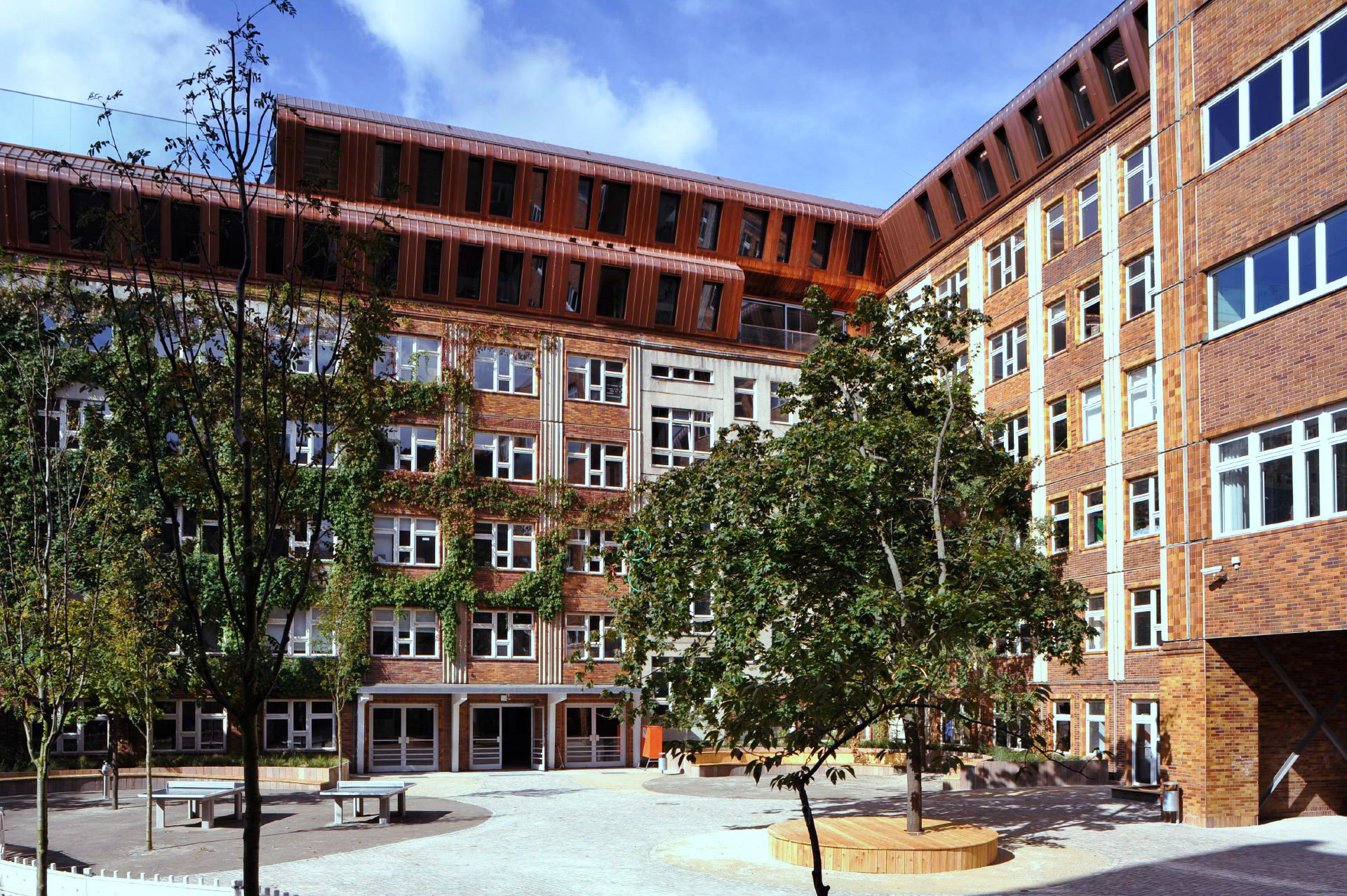
- Berlin Metropolitan School
- Mitte, Berlin; Germany

Information
- Type: Integrated secondary school, integrated all-day school K-12
- Motto: inspire each other - grow together
- Opened: 2004
- Superintendent: Silke Friedrich, Executive Director
- Principal: Saliha Aslan, Primary School Principal Andrés Suárez, Secondary School Principal Samantha Hearn, Head of School
- Faculty: 146
- Grades: Kindergarten-Grade 12
- Enrollment: 1,135
- Campus size: 5,000 meters squared
- Campus type: Urban
- Colors: Dark blue, White

Berlin Metropolitan School is a private international school in Mitte, Berlin, Germany, serving kindergarten through grade 12. As of 2023 there are 1,135 students originating from 65 countries. There are around 146 staff members from 38 counties.

== Tuition ==
It is a private school that charges an enrollment fee of €1,100 and monthly tuition of €210 to €1,340, depending on grade level and yearly household income.

== History ==
Berlin Metropolitan School (BMS) is the oldest and largest international school in Berlin Mitte, founded as a private school in the former East of the city in 2004. Initially bilingual and focused on gifted students, BMS transitioned into an integrated Secondary School with an international IB profile in 2006.

Following negotiations in 2007, BMS acquired its current school grounds and buildings from the Berlin state government, investing in modernizing the campus. In 2016, a building in the back courtyard was acquired for future development. A major project in 2021, led by Sauerbruch Hutton, added modern learning spaces, two school libraries, an auditorium, and a rooftop terrace.

== Authorizations ==
International Baccalaureate

Cambridge Assessment International Education

Senate of Berlin (Senate Administration for Education, Youth and Sciences)

== Structure ==
BMS is state-authorized and recognized and includes a Kindergarten and Preschool Center, Primary School, Integrated Secondary School and Upper Secondary School. (Kita to 12th grade)

== Memberships ==
Council of International Schools (CIS)

Association of German International Schools (AGIS)

European Collaboration of International Schools (ECIS)
