= Rhein-Gymnasium =

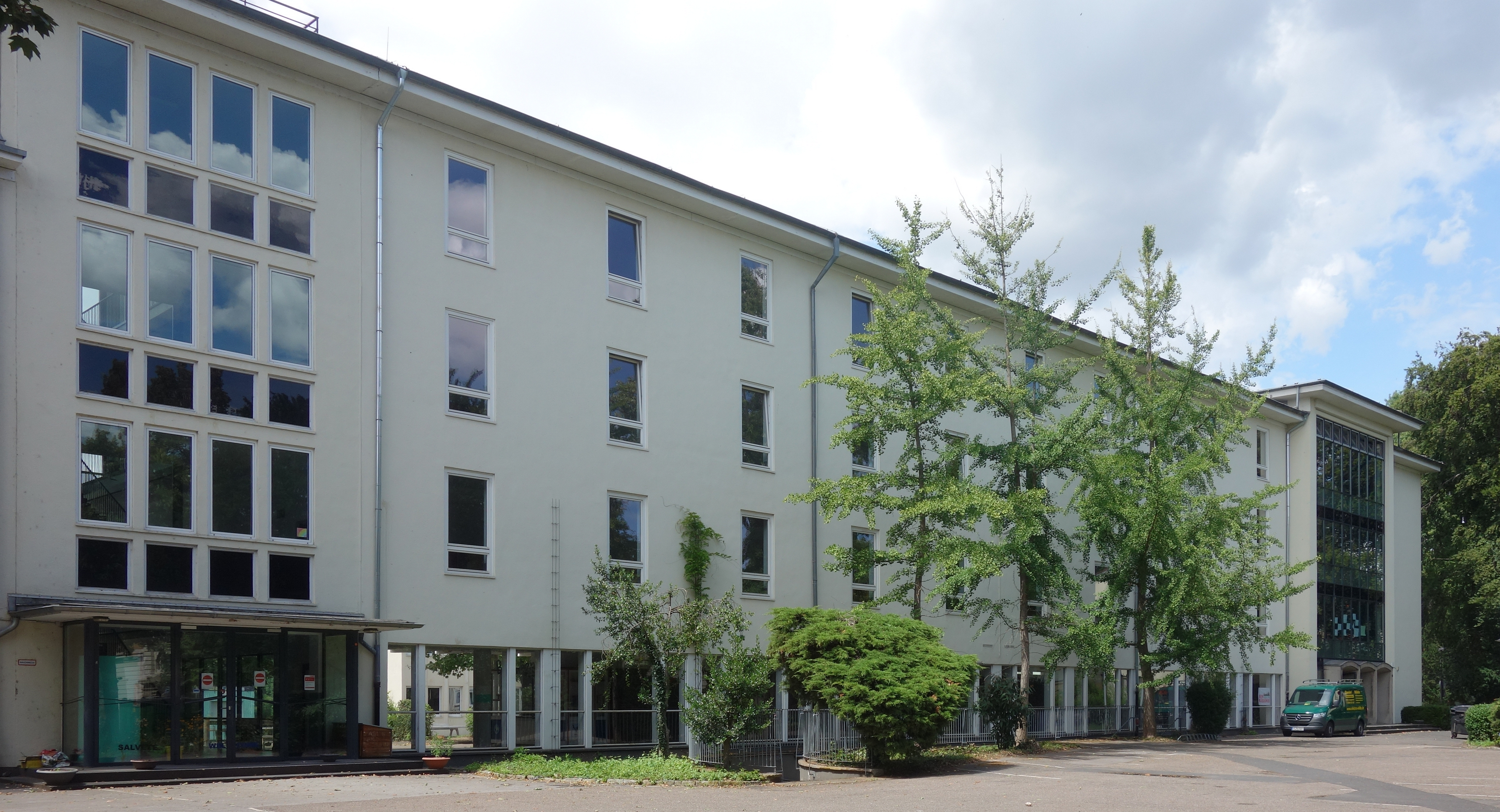
- Rhein-Gymnasium in 2020 (street side)

Location
- Düsseldorfer Str. 13; Cologne 51063; Germany; 50°58′9.04″N 7°0′7.75″E

Information
- Type: Gymnasium
- Established: 1830
- School district: City of Cologne
- Principal: Marco Isermann
- Vice principal: Dr. Michael Wolfertz
- Teaching staff: 73 (2026)
- Grades: 5–12
- Enrollment: 743 (2026)
- Campus: Urban
- Website: www.rhein-gymnasium-koeln.de

The Rhein-Gymnasium is a public secondary school situated on the Rhine riverfront in the Mülheim borough of Cologne. Founded in 1830, the school specializes in natural sciences and languages.

== History ==
The school was founded on April 19, 1830, as a Höhere Bürgerschule (higher civic school) on the initiative of the Mülheim city council and the Prussian administrator in charge, Heinrich Schnabel, and was conceived as a practically oriented alternative to the classical Gymnasium, emphasizing mathematics, the sciences, and modern languages. The founding class comprised 20 to 25 students of both sexes, albeit primarily due the town's lack of funds for a separate girls' school.

In 1836, due to high student enrollment, the school had to move for the first time to the attic of the Mülheim city hall on Wallstraße. Later in 1865, the school was designated a second-class Realschule. Eight years later, in 1873, it became a first-class Realschule. Due to a lack of space, the school relocated once more in 1870 to a new building on Friedrich-Wilhelm-Straße.

Through further curricular reform in 1882, the school became a Realgymnasium and later in 1912 split into two separate institutions: a classical Gymnasium (now Hölderlin-Gymnasium) and a Reformrealgymnasium.

During the Nazi era, the school was reorganized as an all-boys school. The Hitler Youth dominated extracurricular life with more than 90% of students taking part by 1936, among the highest rates of any Cologne school. From 1942 onward, students who were considered Mischling under Nazi racial laws were prohibited or prevented from attending school. The school building was badly damaged in Allied air raids in 1940 and 1944.

Teaching resumed in November 1945 under severe postwar conditions, initially in borrowed premises, as a mathematical-scientific Gymnasium. In 1955 it moved into its current building on the Düsseldorfer Straße and became fully coeducational in 1972. Eventually, in 1989 the school was renamed the Rhein-Gymnasium.

Since then, the Rhein-Gymnasium has increasingly specialized in STEM subjects, and in 2014 it was recognised with the MINT-freundliche Schule (STEM-friendly school) award. In 2009, it became a full-day school as part of a statewide school development programme.

Marco Isermann has been the principal since 2017, taking over from his predecessor, Dr. Jochen Hoffmann.
