= Otto-Hahn-Gymnasium =

Coordinates: 52°28′51″N 10°33′18″E

Location
- Dannenbütteler Weg 2; 38518 Gifhorn; Landkreis Gifhorn; Niedersachsen; Germany

Information
- School type: Public Gymnasium
- Founded: 1950
- Principal: Ingrid Richter
- Teaching staff: 115 (as of 2009)
- Grades: 5 to 13
- Gender: Coeducational
- Website: http://www.ohg-gf.de

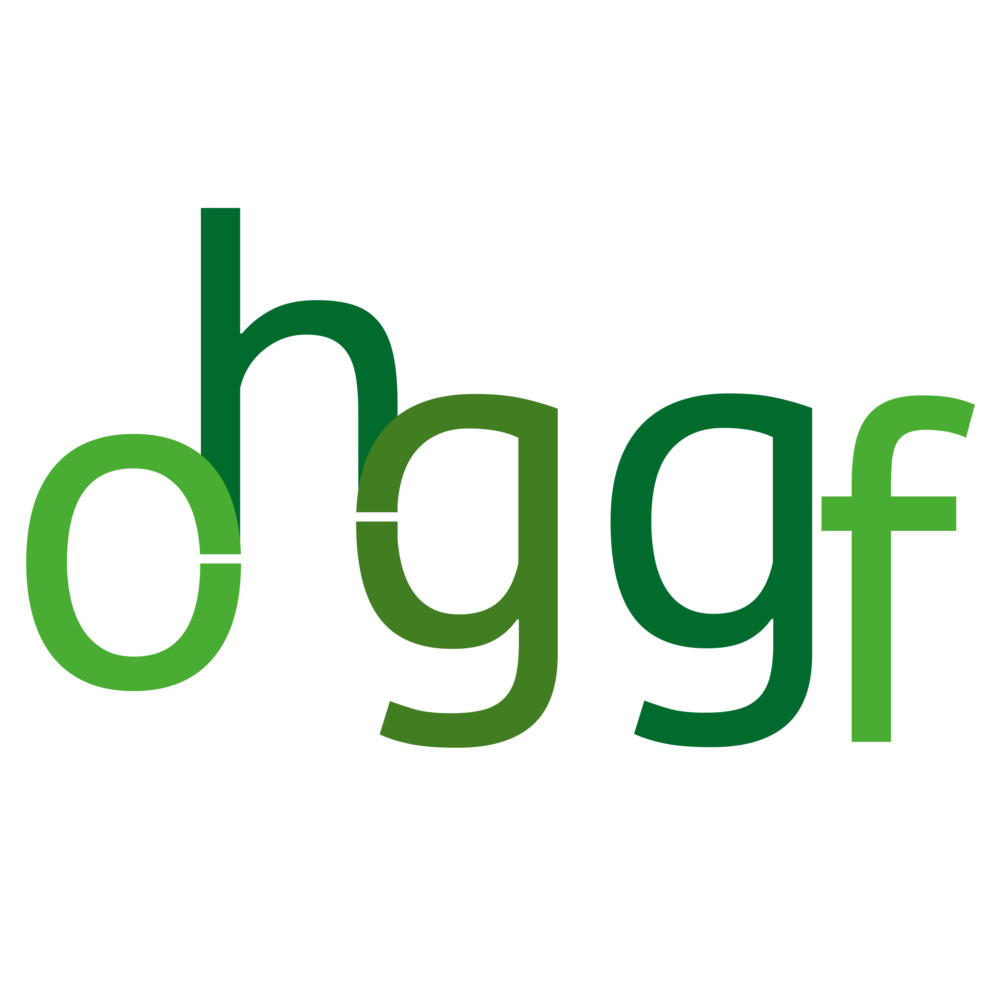
Otto-Hahn-Gymnasium, Gifhorn.

Europaschule Otto-Hahn-Gymnasium is a Gymnasium (high school) in Gifhorn, Lower Saxony, Germany. It is the first Gymnasium in Gifhorn and was founded in 1950 as a private school named "Höhere Privatschule Gifhorn" (Higher Private School Gifhorn). Easter 1954, the school became a public school. In 1969 the school was renamed in its today's name, "Otto-Hahn-Gymnasium". As of 2005 it had 1,456 students and about 115 teachers and student teachers.

== See also ==
- Humboldt-Gymnasium
