= Kepler-Gymnasium Ulm =

Coordinates: 48.4029°N 9.9929°E

Information
- Website: www.kgu.schule.ulm.de

The Kepler-Gymnasium is one of seven gymnasiums in Ulm. A special feature of the Kepler-Gymnasium is its art program, which can be attended from the 5th grade.

== Student life ==
The school's newspaper is the Kepler Kessel.

== Notable people ==
=== Students ===
- Hans Scholl (1918-1943), member of the White Rose anti-Nazi resistance group.
