= Gymnasium Graf-Anton-Guenther School =

School in Lower Saxony, Germany

Coordinates: 53°08′00″N 8°13′04″E

Information
- School type: Gymnasium
- Established: 1920; 105 years ago
- Head teacher: Nicole Voigtländer-Kunze
- Teaching staff: c.110
- Enrollment: c.1600
- Website: www.gymnasium-gag.de

The Graf-Anton-Guenther School is a Gymnasium in Oldenburg, Lower-Saxony, established in 1920. Over 1600 students attend the school in the City of Oldenburg. The school is named after the last Count of Oldenburg Anthony Günther (German: Anton Günther). Headmaster is Nicole Voigtländer-Kunze. About 110 teachers are employed at the school.
