= Albert Schweitzer School =

Secondary school in Offenbach am Main, Hesse, Germany

Coordinates: 50.0960°N 8.7677°E

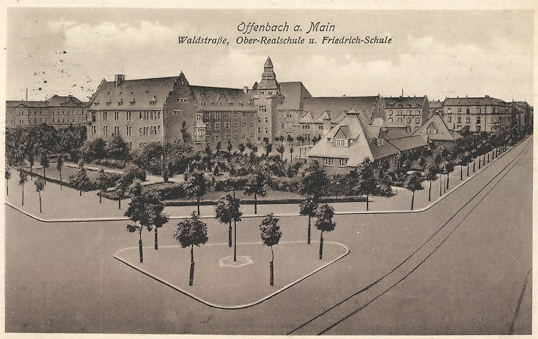
- Offenbach am Main; Hesse

Information
- School type: Gymnasium
- Founded: 1853; 173 years ago
- Website: http://www.albert-offenbach.de/

The Albert Schweitzer School (German: Albert-Schweitzer-Schule) is a gymnasium in Offenbach am Main in the state of Hesse. It was founded in 1853 and was originally named the Höhere Mädchenschule. It received its current name in honour of Albert Schweitzer in 1956; in the same year the school moved to its current buildings, which were built between 1909 and 1911 for the former Grand Ducal High School. The school has admitted boys since 1957. Since the beginning of 2016, the Albert Schweitzer School has been one of the so-called independent schools. From the Hessian Ministry of Education and Cultural Affairs, the high school received more freedom in the design of lessons and finances.
