= Holbein-Gymnasium Augsburg =

Coordinates: 48.3648°N 10.8972°E

Holbein-Gymnasium

Location
- Hallstraße 10; Augsburg; Swabia; Freestate of Bavaria 86150; Germany

Information
- School type: Natural scientific technological and lingual Gymnasium
- Founded: 1833; 193 years ago
- Teaching staff: approximately 130
- Enrollment: approximately 1,460
- Website: www.holbein-gymnasium.de/ueber-uk.htm

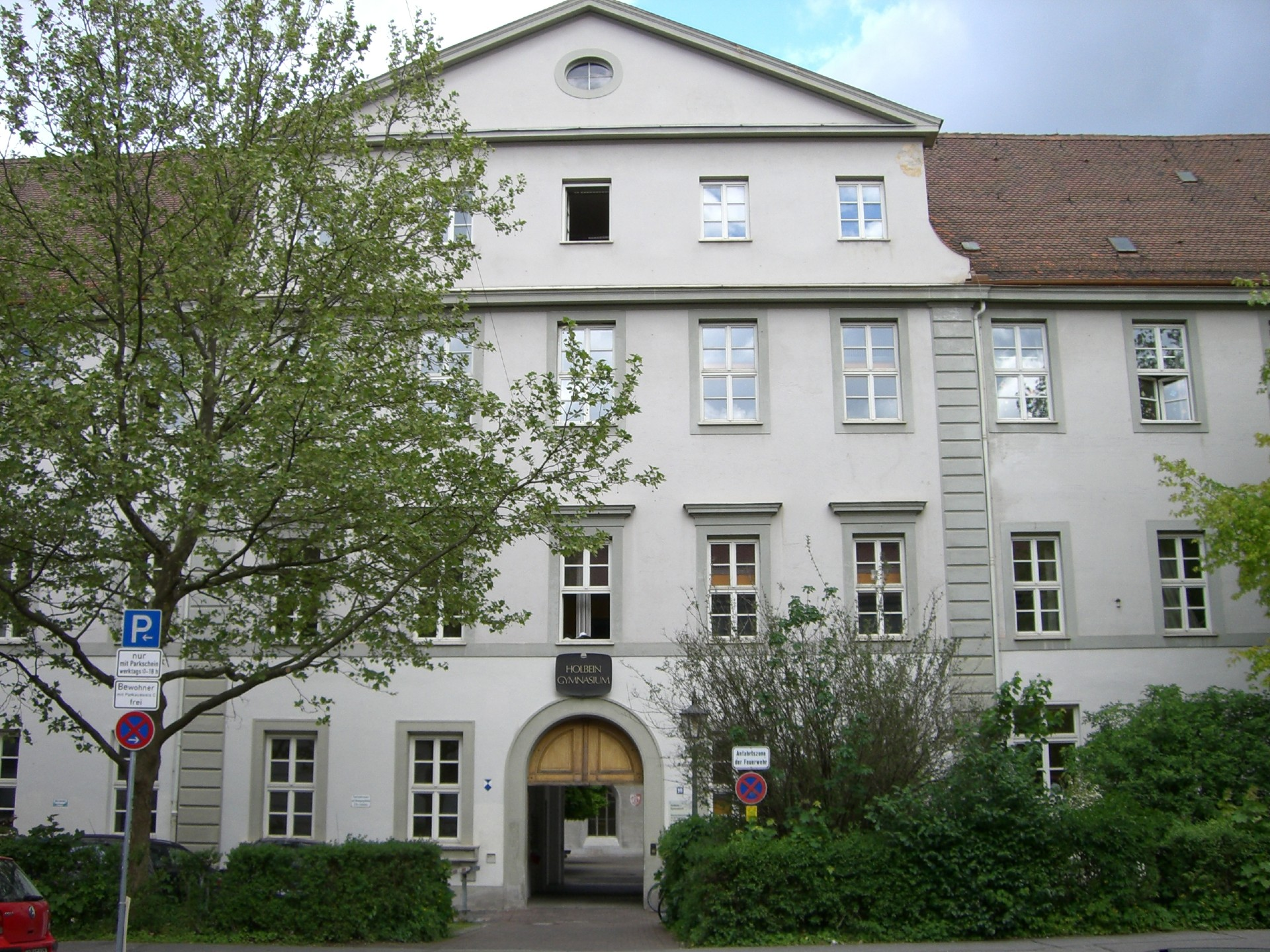

The Holbein-Gymnasium is a natural scientific technological and lingual Gymnasium in Augsburg. It is located in Downtown Augsburg, and partly in the Old Town of Augsburg. Around 1,460 students are currently enrolled, being taught by approximately 130 teachers, which makes it the biggest of ten gymnasiums available in Augsburg. It was founded in 1833, and used as a secondary modern school in 1877.
