= Carl-Zeiss-Gymnasium Jena =

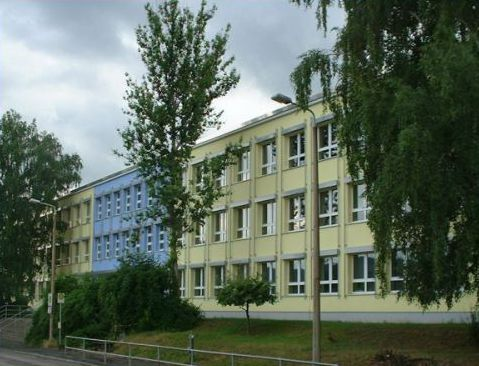

Location
- Erich-Kuithan-Str. 7 Jena, Thuringia; Germany
- Coordinates: 50°57′08″N 11°36′33″E

Information
- Type: German elite Gymnasium for math, science, and technology
- Established: 1963; 63 years ago
- Principal: Dr. Carsten Müller
- Gender: Coeducational
- Enrollment: c. 500
- Website: cz-gymnasium.jena.de

The Carl-Zeiss-Gymnasium Jena is a state-funded German elite gymnasium school (grammar school) teaching highly gifted students in the fields of math, science, and technology. Before changing its profile to fully focus on these aspects, it was a regular German public gymnasium with a special separate school (Spezialschulteil) attached to it. The school is named for optician Carl Zeiss and is located in the city of Jena in Germany's federal state of Thuringia. The school accepts students from all over the federal state.

== Pupils ==
As of March 2017, there were about 500 students attending this school, but not all of them were enrolled in the special education program, which is restricted to highly gifted students. Entrance to the school is contingent on certain requirements, including qualification exams, grades, awards, and previous academic accomplishments.

In order to enter the special education program, students in ninth grade must take an examination, the results of which determine who will be accepted into the special section. Later on, it was made possible that children could enter the special section from fifth grade. Students entering the special education program in fifth grade must also take an examination in ninth grade.

The gymnasium also has a boarding school, established in 2000, which is separate and privately maintained. It offers a possibility for students in ninth to twelfth grade to live close to the school. Fees for this boarding school are subsidized by the federal state, but spaces are limited.

== History ==
=== Formation ===
The Carl-Zeiss-Gymnasium formed after German reunification by affiliating the Polytechnische Oberschule "Clara Zetkin" (polytechnic grammar school "Clara Zetking"), which was founded in 1963, and the Spezialschule mathematisch-naturwissenschaftlich-technischer Richtung "Carl Zeiss" (special school with mathematical and natural science focus). This process first yielded a normal gymnasium, (Carl-Zeiss-Gymnasium), and also a special section (Spezialschulteil). This particular part of the school has been available to students from ninth grade onwards. Since the educational system of the federal state of Thuringia did not allow for a school to be only a Spezialschule (special school), it was necessary to connect it with a regular gymnasium.

=== Support ===
The Carl-Zeiss-Gymnasium Jena has been supported by the Carl Zeiss Foundation, the sole shareholder of Carl Zeiss AG and Schott AG, all of which were founded in Jena. During the time of the German Democratic Republic, many students were recruited by the company and became engineers or managers after their graduation. Even today, there is connection between the school and the company.

In 2025, ZEISS AG donated 20 ZEISS Primostar 1 microscopes to the Carl-Zeiss-Gymnasium Jena, enhancing the school's biology education. ZEISS also contributes €5,000 annually to the school's Support Association, supporting scholarships and projects for gifted students. Additionally, ZEISS awards the ZEISS Annual Prize for outstanding high school diploma performances.

=== Facilities ===
The school receives good funding from the federal state and is well equipped compared to other gymnasiums in the region. The technical sections of the school meet high standards.

The special school section used to be in a separate building from the regular one. After the main building was renovated from 2002 to 2005, the special school moved in the main building. The old building is now used by an elementary school.

=== Transition ===
After a trial period ending in 2008, the school was supposed to be completely transformed into a mere Spezialschule (special school), after which the program would be available to students in fifth grade and older.

Thereby, the position of the Leiter der Spezialklassen (guidance of the special classes) would not be needed anymore because the leading of the school is currently separate. This office had been held for a long time by Rüdiger Eisenbrand, who quit his official school service. He became the mayor of the city of Apolda.

== Curriculum ==
=== Syllabus ===
The curriculum of the Spezialschule (special school) differs tremendously from those of regular gymnasiums in Thuringia. The curriculum focuses in depth on mathematics and natural science, with an abundance of classes related to those topics. Classes are kept very small, often 14–20 students maximum.

Since the curriculum of the Carl-Zeiss-Gymnasium is highly mathematically and scientifically oriented, it offers advanced educational sessions for students. Starting in ninth grade, every student gets to choose one subject of study to deepen their knowledge in the fields of math, physics, biology, chemistry, or computer science. Two extra lessons a week are dedicated to the student's chosen field. Unlike normal subjects, tutors of this Wahlobligatorischer Unterricht (selective compulsory curriculum) do not grade students for those extra sessions.

In 11th and 12th grades, when the Kurssystem (course system) applies for the students, they have to take mathematics as their major field of study. As the second major field of study, they can choose informatics, chemistry, biology, or physics.

=== Projects ===
Ninth-grade students have to write their first project paper on a scientific topic of their choice. It is unusual to assign a large project of this type to students in such an early grade.

Project work continues in 10th grade, when students write an Informatikprojekt (informatics project), in which students (mostly in small groups) have to write a software program, as well as a paper in which they document problems, solutions, and algorithms. At the end, they have to give a presentation.

The Seminarfacharbeit (seminar paper) – a major project during 11th grade – has to be written about a mathematical or scientific topic.

=== Graduation ===
In addition to the [[Abitur|Abitur (German high school diploma)]] a modified "special version" with additional requirements can be taken, even though the Abitur is already difficult in comparison to American high school diploma requirements.

== Reputation ==
Students at the Carl-Zeiss-Gymnasium have achieved success in academic competitions on a national and an international level, including the International Mathematical Olympiad, the Bundeswettbewerb Informatik (federal informatics contest), the International Chemistry Olympiad, the International Biology Olympiad and the International Physics Olympiad.

On some occasions, the school has hosted some of those competitions mentioned above.
