= Humboldt Gymnasium =

School in Lower Saxony, Germany

Coordinates: 52.4865°N 10.5293°E

Location
- Gifhorn, Lower Saxony; Germany

Information
- School type: Gymnasium
- Established: 1979; 46 years ago
- Head teacher: Michael Weiß
- Teaching staff: 70
- Enrollment: c.1000 (2002)
- Website: https://www.humboldtgymnasium.de/CMS/

Europaschule Humboldt-Gymnasium is a Gymnasium (high school) in Gifhorn, Lower Saxony, Germany. It is the second high school in the town after Otto-Hahn-Gymnasium and was founded in 1979. As of 2002 it had about 1000 students and 70 teachers, making it one of the largest schools in the district. Its headmaster is Michael Weiß.

== History ==
The school was awarded the title "Europaschule" or "European school" in 1998.

In 2009, the school won the 361-Degree Tolerance competition, which was started by YouTube, and which had the German chancellor, Angela Merkel, as patron.
