= Hölty-Gymnasium =

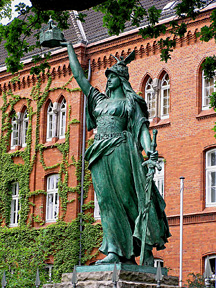

Location
- Hindenburgstraße 25; Wunstorf, Lower-Saxony 31515; Germany
- Coordinates: 52.4244°N 9.4372°E

Information
- Type: Public High School
- Established: 1922
- Principal: Thomas van Gemmern
- Hours in school day: 7.30 a.m. - 5.30 p.m.
- Website: http://hoelty-gymnasium.de/

Hölty-Gymnasium is a public high school established in 1922 in Wunstorf, Germany.

== History ==
The school was established in 1922 as an Aufbauschule in the buildings which had been used by the Königlich-Preußischen Evangelischen Schullehrer-seminar, which had been built from 1872 to 1876. Both institutions existed between 1922 and 1925, when the school was given its current name after Ludwig Christoph Heinrich Hölty.

Today (2022), the school is a general education Gymnasium, a coeducational open all-day school with about 1300 students. The school offers a bilingual program in which the subject of history is taught in English in the 9th and 10th grades. The high school is also committed to sustainability and social issues; for example, the school has provided financial support to a school in Madagascar for many years. The school offers the Abitur after nine years of schooling (G9). Classes begin at 8:20 a.m. and end no later than 5:30 p.m. with a lunch break between 1:45 p.m. and 2:25 p.m.
