= Archenhold School =

- Archenhold Gymnasium

Location
- Rudower Str. 7 Berlin, Berlin; Germany
- Coordinates: 52°27′03″N 13°31′23″E

Information
- Type: Public High School
- Motto: Fit for the University
- Established: 1921
- School district: Treptow-Köpenick
- Principal: Michael Uhlig (since 2005)
- Faculty: ~50
- Grades: 7-12
- Enrollment: 710 (2011/12)
- Houses: Main building, Extension/Science building, Gymnasium
- Mascot: Simon
- Website: www.archenhold.de
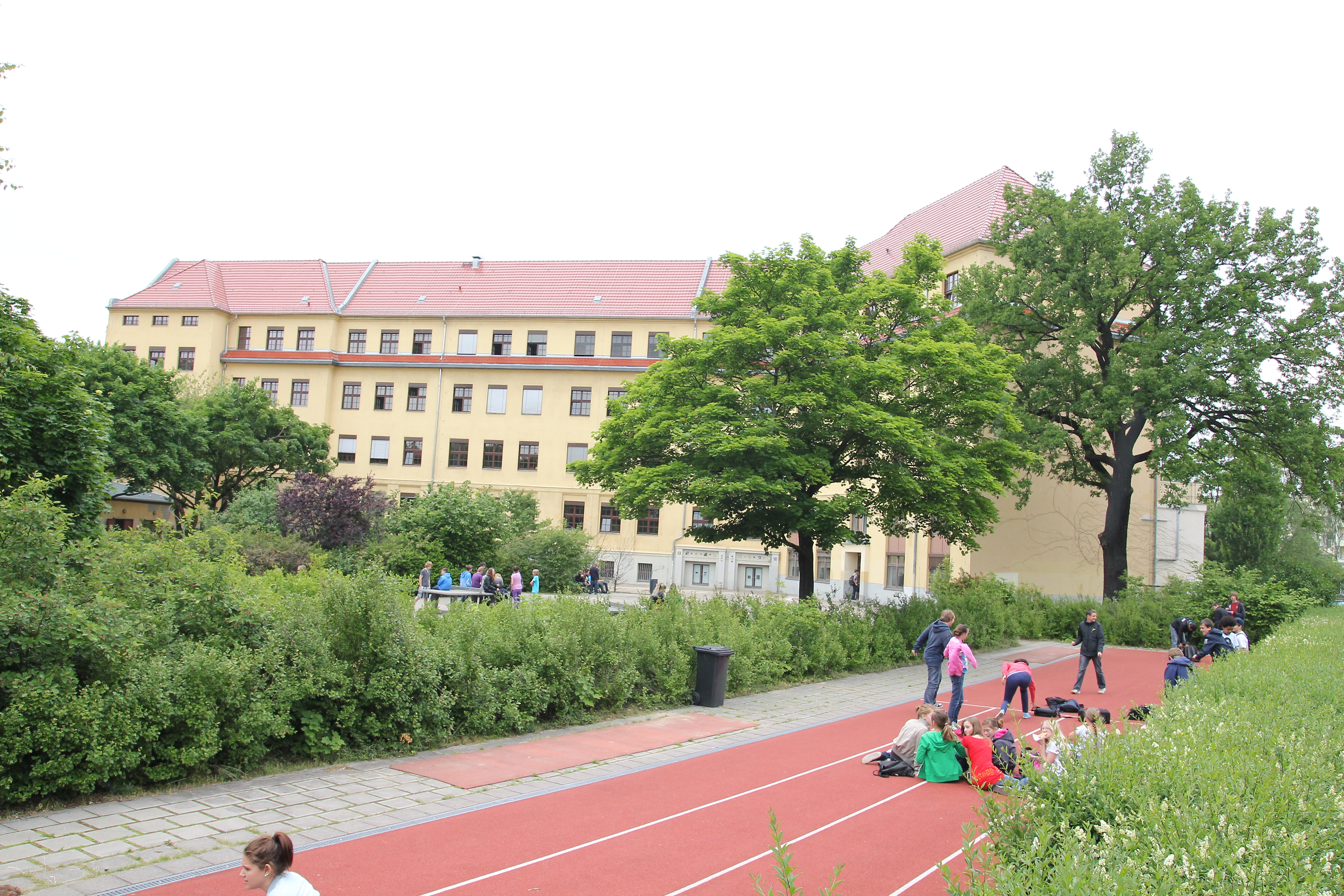
- Main building

Archenhold School is a public high school located in Treptow-Köpenick, Berlin, Germany in the school district Berlin-Niederschöneweide. It teaches grades 7–12. The school motto is "Fit for the university". Its partner schools are the Lycée Aux Lazaristes in Lyon, France, and the Frederiksborg Gymnasium in Hillerød, Denmark.

== History ==
In the year 1914 the construction of the school building was started and was finally completed in 1921. The interruption was caused by the First World War. The school was named 2. Gemeindeschule (elementary school) and was renamed the first time in 1927 as 14. Volksschule. In 1938 it was again renamed as 7. Volkschule. During the Second World War the building was used as military hospital and barracks. After the end of the Second World War it was used by the Red Army. In 1948 the 7. Volkschule was able to return to the school building. In 1956 the school was renamed another time, now to the 7. Mittelschule. In 1959 the school type was changed to a Polytechnic Secondary School by the school reform act. This school type represents a comprehensive school teaching grades 1 – 10. The building was enlarged by a 3-level extension in 1965. In 1971 the school was given the name 7. Oberschule "Feliks E. Dzierzynski". Named after the former of the "Cheka", the first Soviet secret service. This name stayed until the German reunification. In this time the school had a good relationship with the Felix Dzerzhinsky Guards Regiment. After a renovation from 1989 to 1991 the former Klement-Gottwald-Oberschule located in Berlin-Plänterwald moved into the building. On 14 October 1992 the school was given its current name "Archenhold-Oberschule", named after Friedrich Simon Archenhold, a famous German astronomer, and the approximately five kilometers away Archenhold Observatory in the same borough.

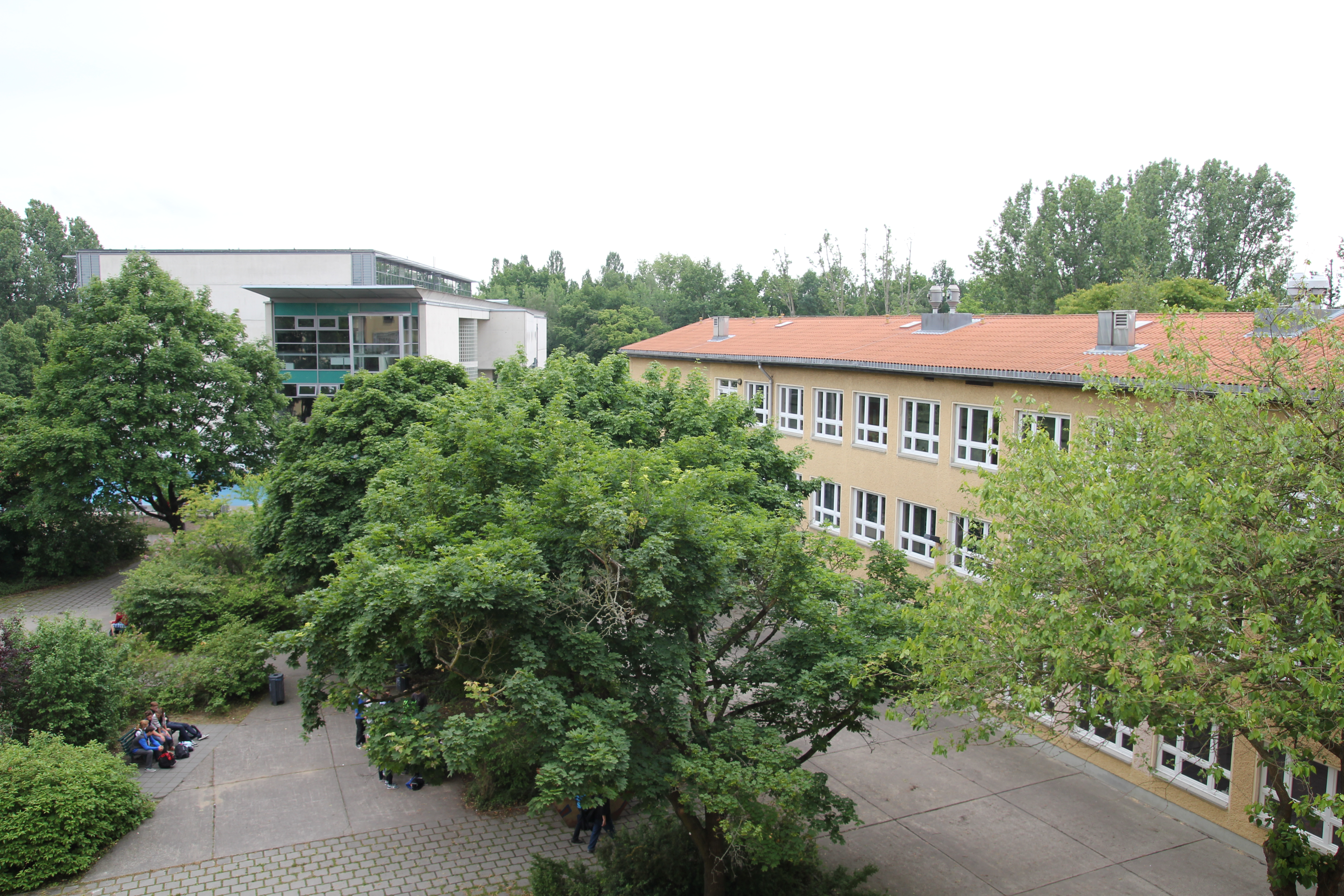
Gymnasium (left) and Extension/Science building (right)

The Archenhold School is subdivided into three different buildings:

- The older main building with four floors excluding the cellar and the attic.
- The newer extension at right angles to the end of the main building with three floors. Here informatics and the natural sciences physics, chemistry, biology and astronomy are taught.
- The also newer gymnasium on the other side of the schoolyard which actually consists of two equally sized gymnasiums, one on top of the other. The lower gymnasium has a raised stand with a weight room next to it. The building also contains the library over two floors.
