= Montfort Realschule Zell =

School in Germany

Coordinates: 47.70651°N 7.8433597°E

Information
- Former name: Volksschule Zell (1955-1959); Mittelschule Zell (1959-1970); Realschule Zell (1970-1986)
- Established: 1955
- Head teacher: Norbert Asal
- Website: https://www.morz.de/

The Montfort Realschule in Zell im Wiesental, a town in the Black Forest in Germany, is a school with approximately 800 students. The school contains 5th through 10th grades for kids coming from cities nearby. Courses offered include English, French, and many of the classes expected of a school, such as grammar and History. In 1986, the school was named after the noble Montfort family, who settled in the area in the 18th century where they developed a regional textile industry.

== History ==
The school was founded in 1955 as an extension to Zell Elementary School. It was recognised as a middle school in 1959.

In 1970, the school was renamed from Mittelschule (middle school) to Realschule (real school), a type of secondary school.

In 1986, the school was renamed after Meinrad Montfort, a Zell resident and founder of the textile industry in the Middle and Upper Wiesental valleys.
