= Bertolt-Brecht-Gesamtschule =

Coordinates: 50.7458°N 7.0533°E

- Bonn, North Rhine-Westphalia; Germany

Information
- Other names: BBG
- School type: Comprehensive School
- Founded: 1998; 28 years ago
- Authority: Frank Szmala
- School code: 193811
- Principal: Frank Szmala

The Bertolt-Brecht-Gesamtschule (Literally Bertolt Brecht comprehensive school) is a comprehensive school in the city of Bonn, Germany.

== General information ==
The school was named after German theatre practitioner, playwright, and poet Bertolt Brecht. The school concerns itself with teaching students about human rights, world peace and sustainability. Since 2011, the school has also been an UNESCO partner.

== Buildings ==
The school consists of an older (Grades 7-10) and newer (Grades 5-6 & 11-13) schoolhouse, an auditorium, a music-lessons building, two sports halls and two sports fields, a big one and a small one.

Since 2023, the older schoolhouse is being renovated, resulting in the children attending class in containers, which are placed on the larger sports field, occupying most of it. Renovations are believed to end in late 2025. This is not the first instance of the school being renovated, as one of the sports halls had to be renovated because of it partially burning down. The sport hall's renovation was finished in 2023. Also, the auditorium's glass facade has been covered up by white sheets because it is damaged as well. A renovation date for that is unclear.

== School programs ==
This school takes part in these programs:

- Schule ohne Rassismus – Schule mit Courage
- Zukunftsschulen NRW – Netzwerk Lernkultur Individuelle Förderung
- Erasmus+ – Schulbildung
- ArbeiterKind.de
- Kooperation NRW-Talentförderung

== Awards ==
This school won these awards

- MINT SCHULE NRW
- Schulentwicklungspreis der Unfallkasse Nordrhein-Westfalen – Gute gesunde Schule (Preisträger 2016)
- Qualitätssiegel (Von Lions Quest – Erwachsen werden)
- Medien Scouts Schule (2022 & 2023)

== Gallery ==
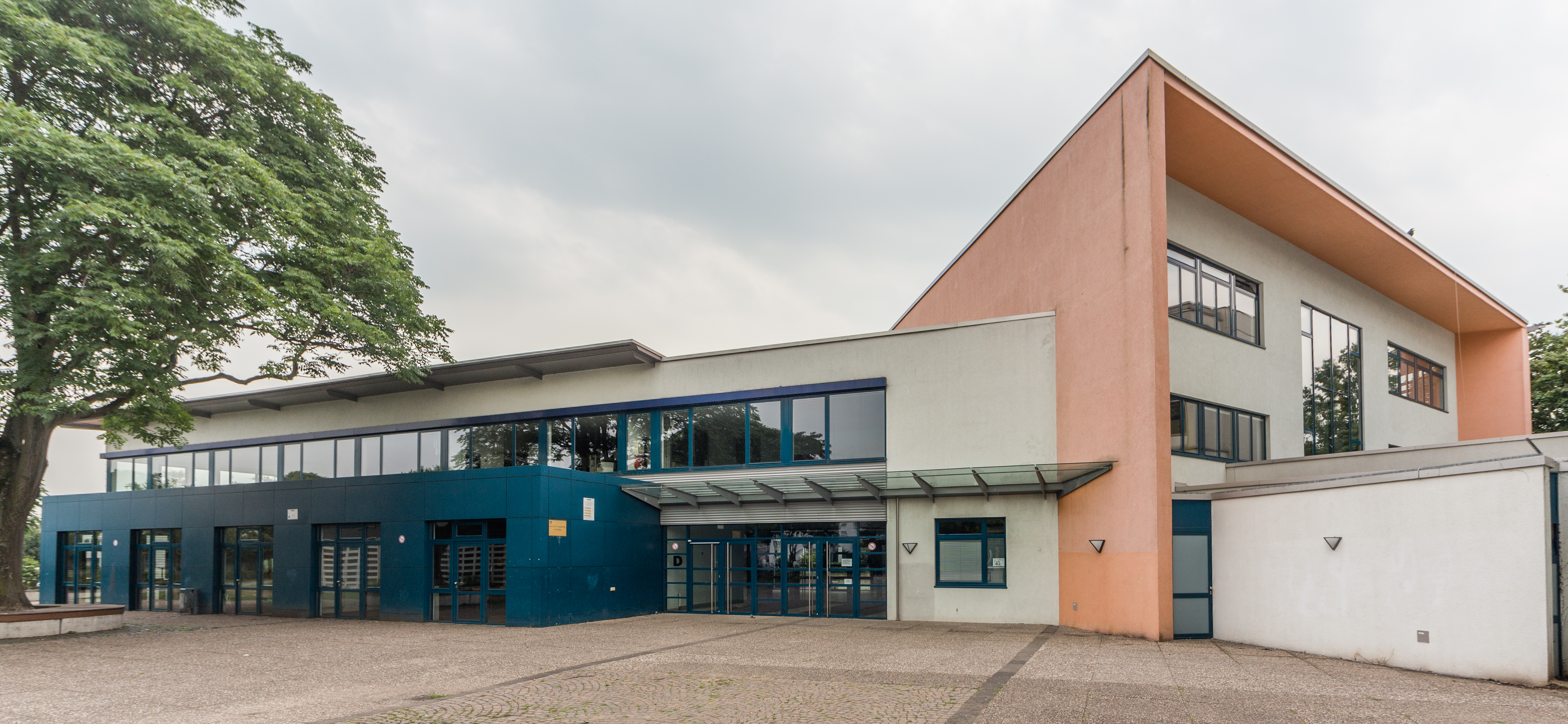
Newer Schoolhouse

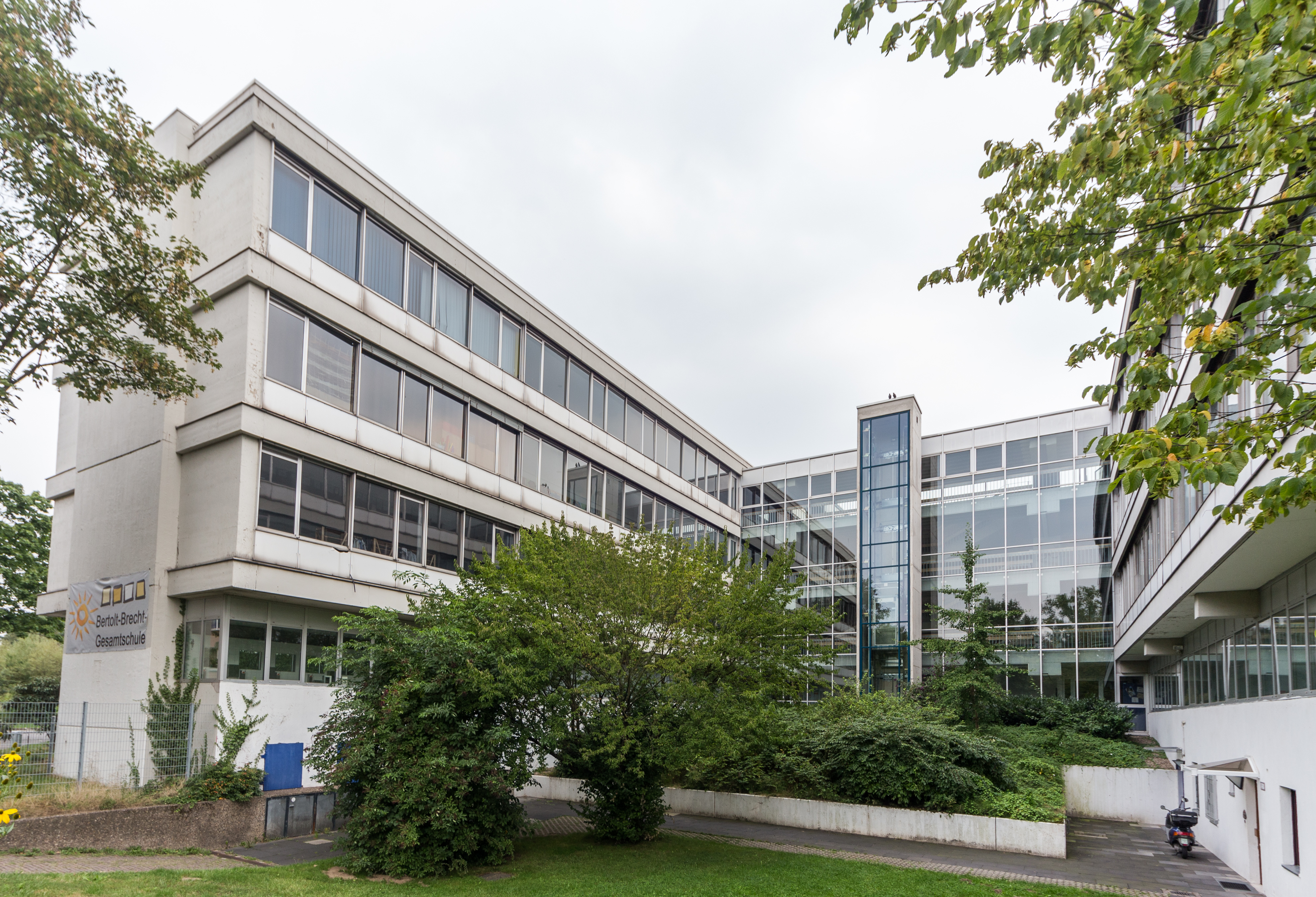
Older Schoolhouse (Pre-renovation)

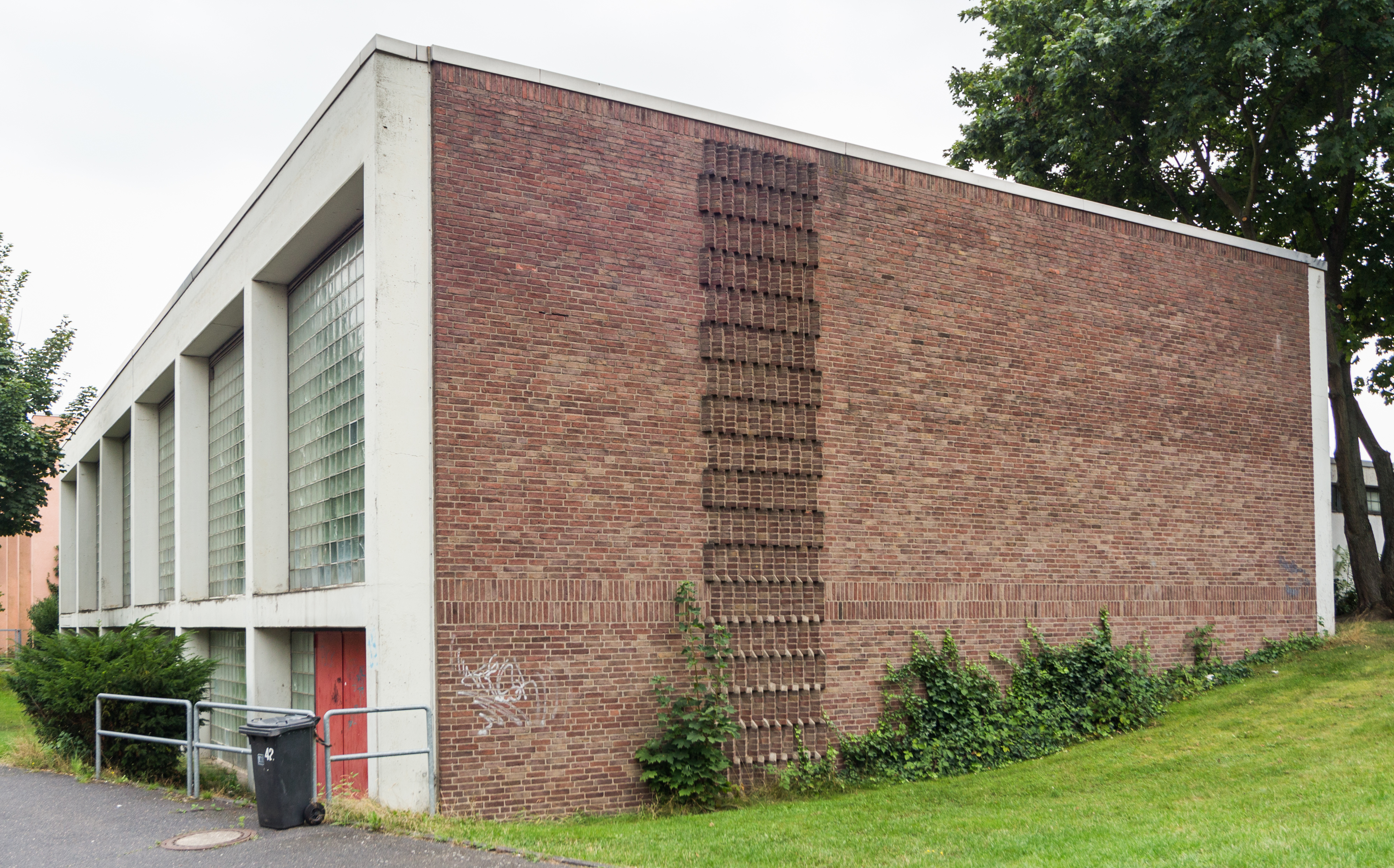
One of the sports halls

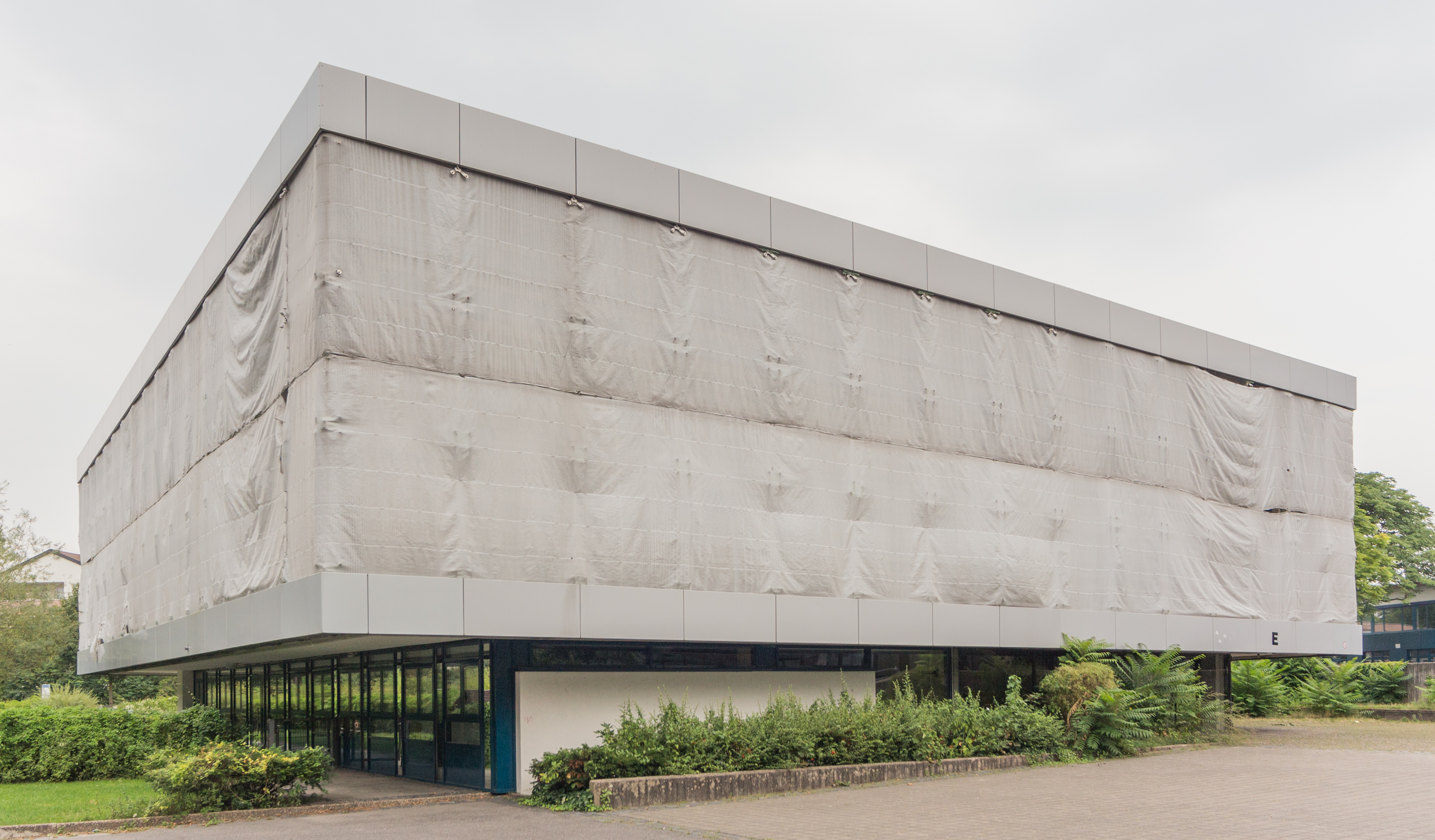
The auditorium

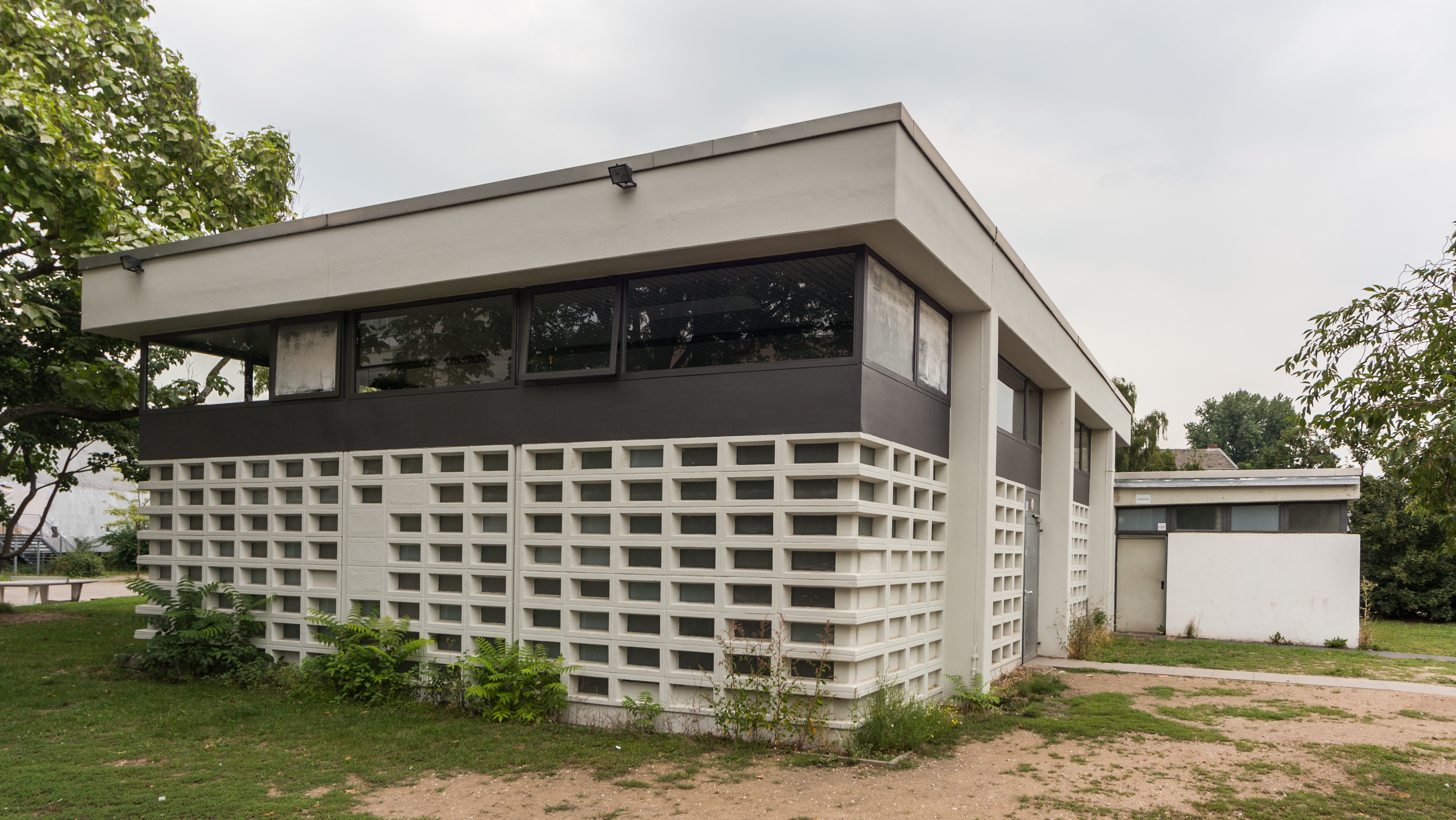
Music-lessons-building

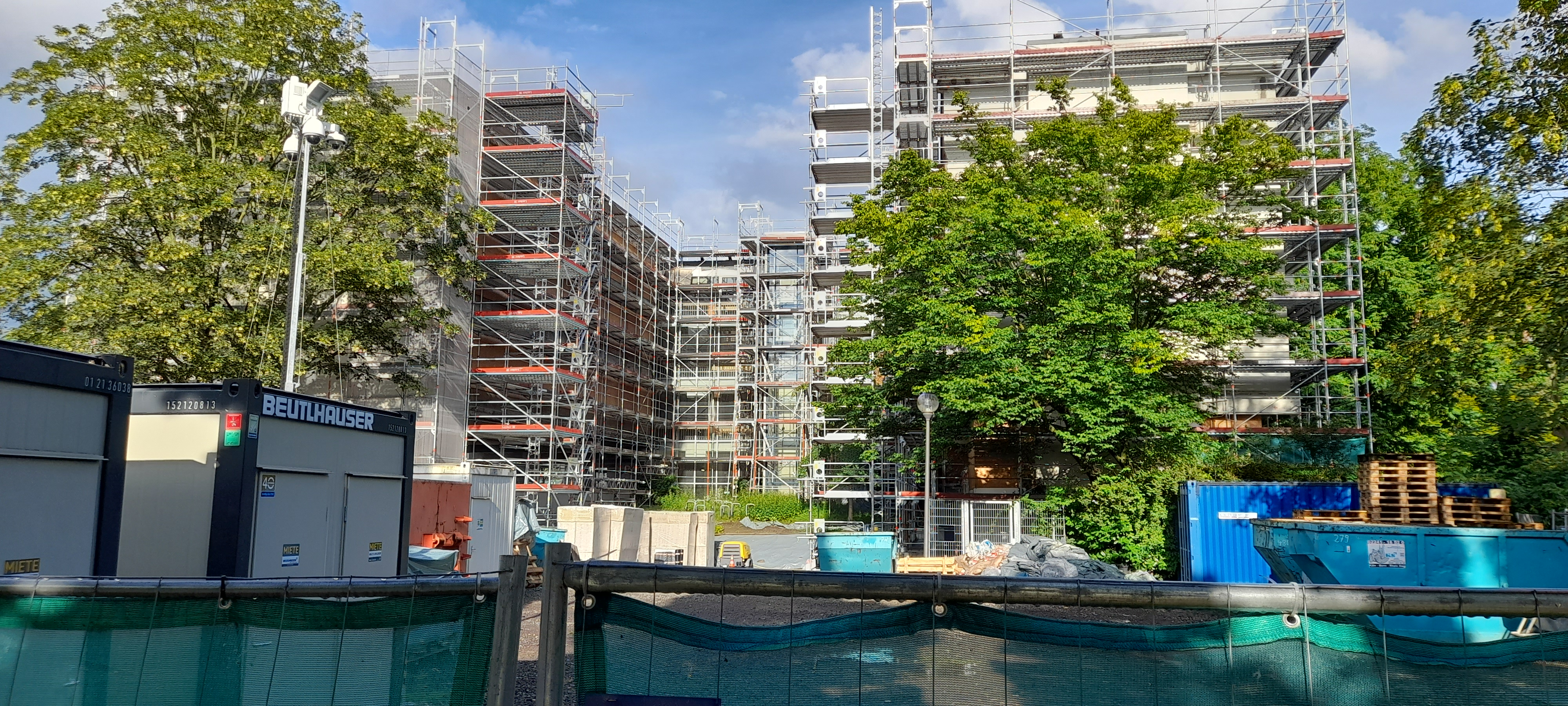
Older schoolhouse (During renovation)

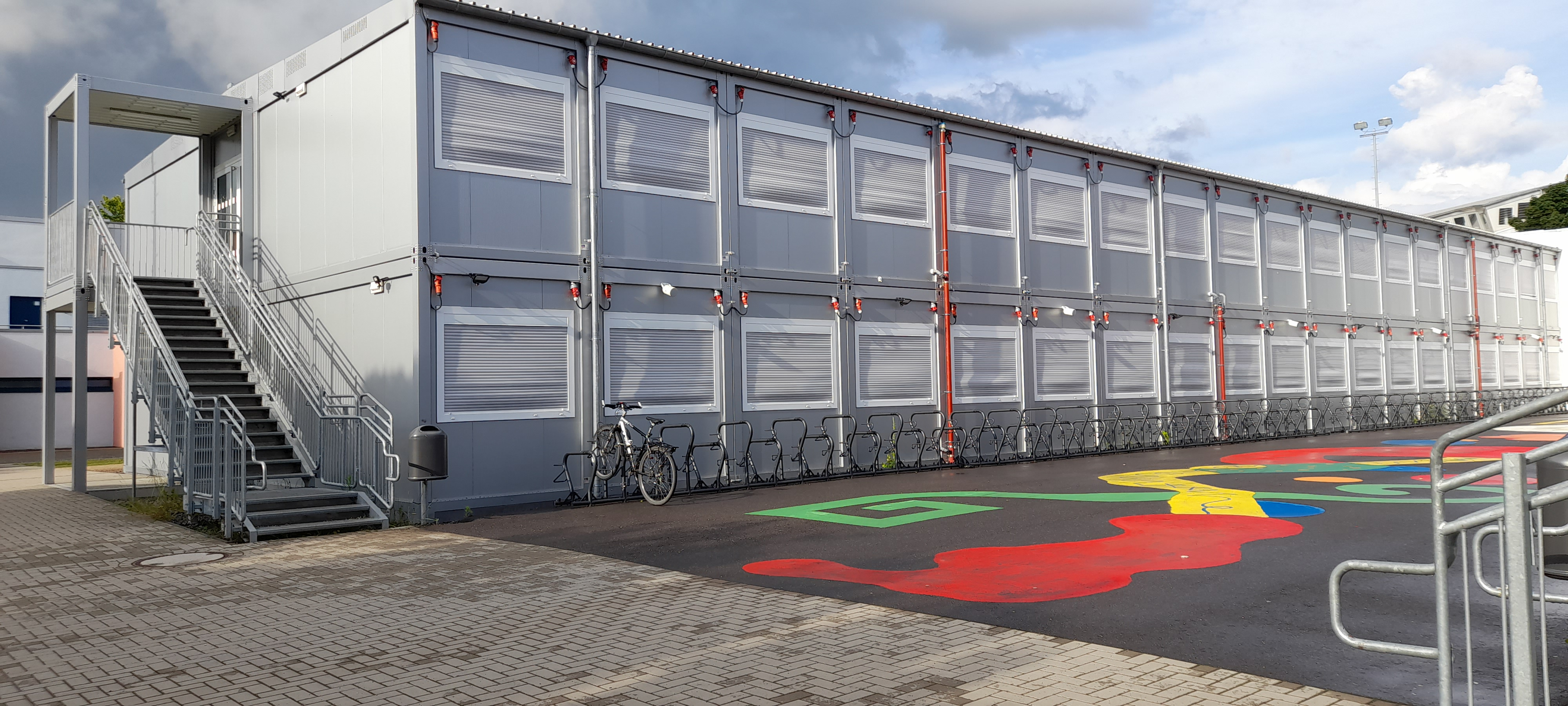
One of the containers (Temporary replacement for the older schoolhouse)
