= Cäcilienschule Oldenburg =

School in Lower-Saxony, Germany

Coordinates: 53.14101°N 8.20378°E

Cäcilienschule Oldenburg is a Gymnasium (grammar school) in Oldenburg, Lower-Saxony, Germany. The Cäcilienschule is one of the 160 project schools of UNESCO in Germany.

== History ==
In 1836 Peter of Oldenburg founded the school as an all-girls' school. In 1867 Cäcilienschule Oldenburg was the first public girls' school in the Grand Duchy of Oldenburg. The school was named after the former Grand Duchess Princess Cecilia of Sweden. Since the mid-1970s both girls and boys attend the school.

== Cäcilienschule Today ==
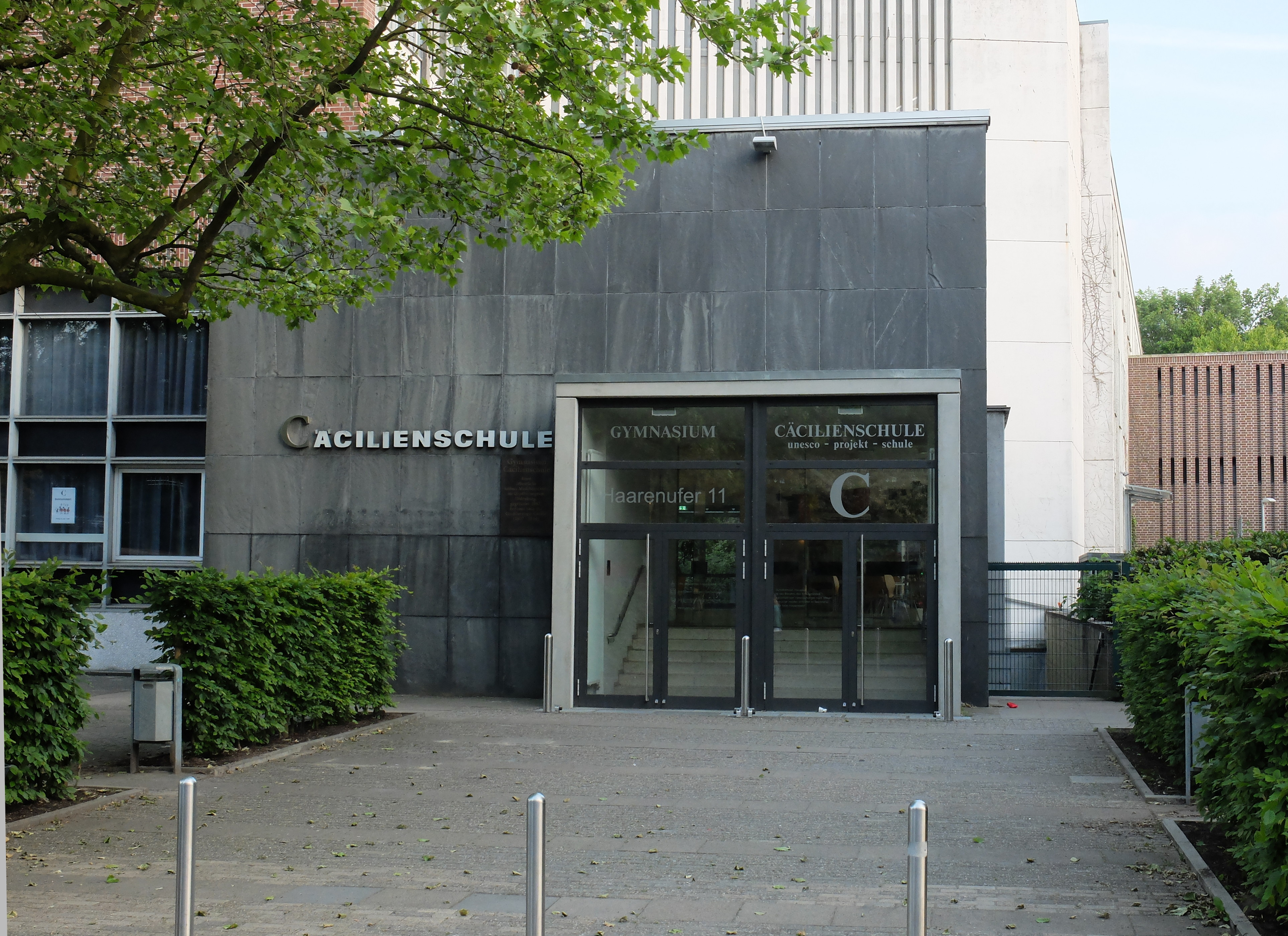
Entrance of Cäcilienschule Oldenburg

Today about 970 students attend Cäcilienschule, of which about two-thirds are girls, which is probably due to the tradition of the former girls' school. The school consists of 82 teachers and five student teachers.

Since 1991, Cäcilienschule is part of the UNESCO ASPNet.

Since 2008, Cäcilienschule's power supply is 100% green electricity. Worksheet copies are only printed on recycled paper.

Cäcilienschule is known for its ensembles: Big band, orchestra, and choir.

Cäcilienschule has International Exchange Programs with Pennsbury High School in Pennsylvania, Buc in France, and in Saint Petersburg.

== Notable alumni ==
- Wigald Boning (* 1967), German comedian, composer, musician, presenter, and journalist.
- Ulrike Meinhof (born October 7, 1934, † May 9, 1976), co-founder of the Red Army Faction.
