= Helene-Lange-Schule (Frankfurt) =

Location
- Breuerwiesenstraße 4; 65929 Frankfurt am Main; Germany; 50.1072°N 8.5541°E

Information
- Established: 1874
- Headmaster: Christian Kalina
- Enrollment: 567 (as of 2009)
- Website: www.hela-frankfurt.de

Helene-Lange-Schule is a modern language gymnasium (another term for secondary school) in Frankfurt am Main, Hessen, Germany. The headmaster is Christian Kalina.

In 2009 there were 567 students. In 2007, there were 52 teachers.

== History and school structure ==
The school was founded on May 1, 1874 on the initiative of Karl Königs, a director of the Farbwerke Meister, Lucius & Brüning, as a private, "higher daughter school" in Höchst am Main. In 1896 it became a municipal school. Since 1946 it has been called the Helene Lange School.

At first, classes took place in the eastern pavilion of the "bolongaropalast", until, after several moves, the school moved into the current building on the edge of the Höchst city park in 1965.

Since the end of the Second World War, the school has borne the name of the women's rights activist Helene Lange. It remained an all-girls school until 1975.

As part of the upper school reform pilot project, the Helene Lange School became a pilot school in 1970 beyond the borders of Frankfurt. In 1972 it was decided to merge the upper school with that of the Leibniz School and this was implemented by 1975. Since then, the Helene-Lange-School has formed a school network together with the Leibniz School and the newly founded upper school, the Friedrich-Dessauer-Gymnasium. This is characterised by close personal and pedagogical cooperation. Teachers at the Helene-Lange School also teach at the Friedrich-Dessauer-Gymnasium and vice versa. After the 10th grade, almost all pupils switch to the Friedrich-Dessauer-Gymnasium in order to take their Abitur there.

In addition to English, French is also offered as a first foreign language.

The school has its own observatory with a telescope on the roof of the main building.

== Partner Schools ==
- Lycée Maurice-Ravel in Paris

== Famous former teachers ==
- Amalie Froehlich (* 1876, † 1938), Member of the first Prussian state parliament (DVP)
- Hans-Ludwig Neumann (* 1938, † 1991), physicist, president of the Physikalischer Verein (1976 until 1990)
