= Matthias-Grünewald-Gymnasium (Würzburg) =

Coordinates: 49°47′14″N 9°57′13″E

Location
- Würzburg; Germany

Information
- School type: Boarding Gymnasium
- Gender: Mixed
- Website: www.mgg-wuerzburg.de

Matthias-Grünewald-Gymnasium is a secondary school (gymnasium) in Würzburg, Germany.

== History ==
The school was given its current name in 1965.

== Structure ==
The school offers boarding for pupils from the age of 10.

== Notable alumni ==
- Claus Kühnl
