= Schulzentrum Saterland =

General school in Germany

Coordinates: 53°05′57″N 7°40′46″E

Schulzentrum Saterland (SZS) is a general education day school in Lower Ramsloh, Saterland, in Lower Saxony, Germany, established in 1971, comprising both a primary and a secondary school. The school's name in their native Sater Frisian is "Grote Skoul fon't Seelterlound," the "Great School of Saterland." The school consists of both a high school and junior high school. The Laurentius-Siemer-Gymnasium was (as of 2007) being constructed on the same site.

The school is the successor of earlier schools on the site, dating back to 1613,
