= Europagymnasium Kerpen =

Location
- Philipp-Schneider-Straße; 50171 Kerpen; Rhein-Erft-Kreis; Kerpen, North Rhine-Westphalia, 50171; Germany
- Coordinates: 50°52′42.39″N 6°41′21.58″E

Information
- School type: Public Gymnasium
- Founded: 1968
- School number: 166741
- Head of school: Wendel Hennen
- Grades: 5–12
- Gender: Coeducational
- Slogan: Gemeinsam lernen und leben – grenzüberschreitend denken und handeln
- Newspaper: Gymnasium aktuell and Educat
- Website: www.gymnasiumkerpen.eu

Old logo

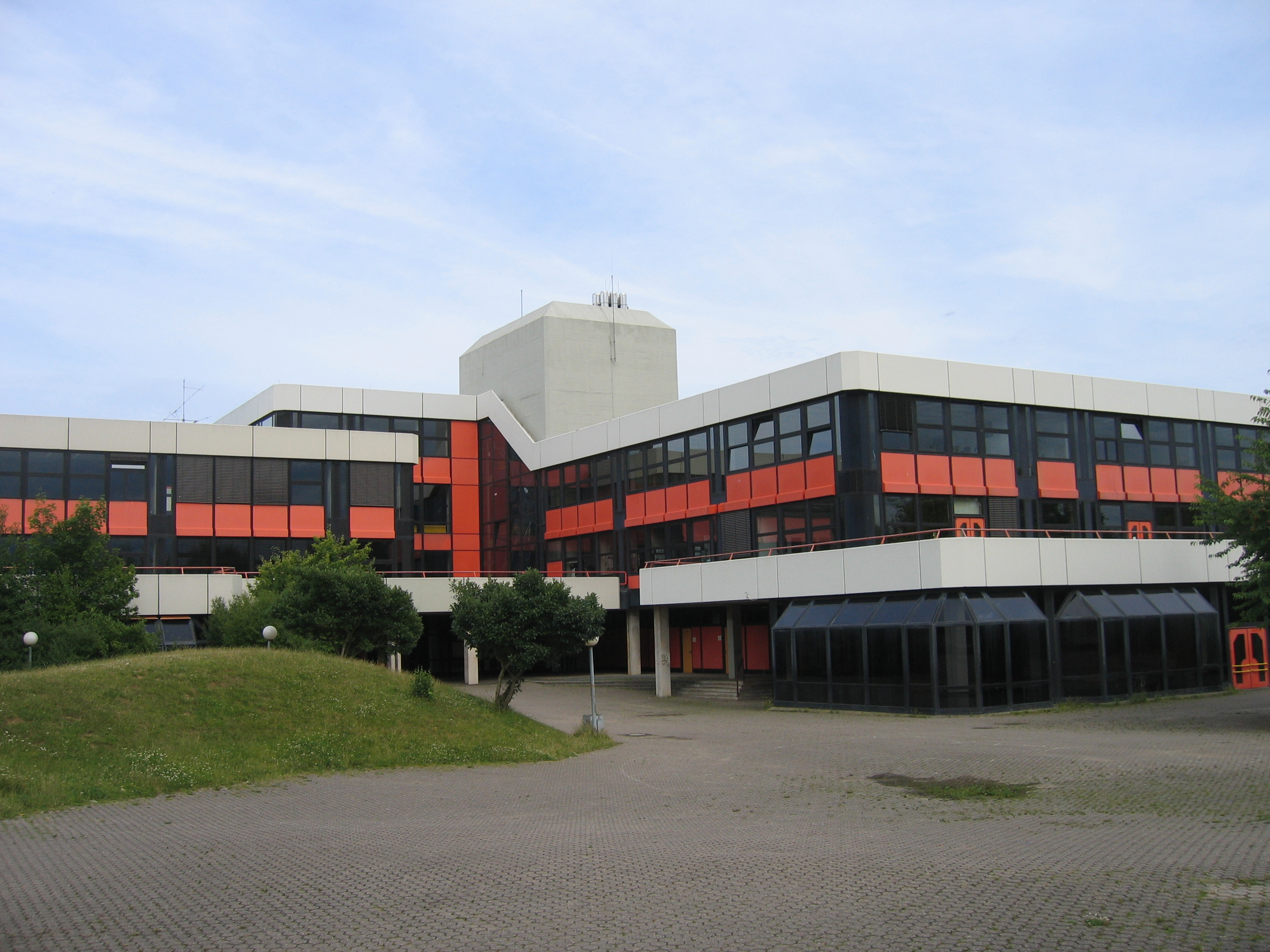
The building

The Europagymnasium Kerpen (German, European high school Kerpen) is a Gymnasium in Kerpen, North Rhine-Westphalia, Germany.

The school was founded in 1968. In 2001, it was certified as a Europaschule (de) by the Ministry of Schools of North Rhine-Westphalia. (Note: Not to be confused with the accredited status awarded by the international organisation, The European Schools.)

== Facilities ==
The school has an auditorium, a cafeteria, a refectory, two triple gyms, a library with more than 33,000 books and CD-ROMs, band practice rooms and different school yards.

== Bilingual education ==
Since the 1995/1996 school year, a bilingual German-English branch is offered. In grades 5 and 6, students who choose the bilingual branch have seven lessons in English a week instead of five. Geography is taught in English from grade 7, politics from grade 8 and history from grade 9.

== Sixth form ==
In the sixth form (formerly grades 11 to 13, now grades 10 to 12) the curriculum is divided up into “social sciences”, “Mathematics and natural sciences”, “languages” and “other subjects”. Special subjects at the sixth form are pedagogy, psychology, social sciences, nutrition science, technology, foreign language correspondence English respective economy English, Italian and literature.

=== Vocational education foreign language correspondence ===
In the sixth form the students can take a vocational education as foreign language correspondent. Students who pass get, in addition to their Abitur, a finished apprenticeship/vocational education.

== Student exchange programs ==
Students have the opportunity to take part in student exchange programs with partner-schools located in Argentina, Bolivia, China, France, Italy, Nicaragua, Poland, Russia, Spain (Gran Canaria and Tenerife), Sweden, United Kingdom and the United States (Pennsylvania and Texas).
