= Zachariae =

Zachariä, Zachariae is a German surname. Notable people with the surname include:

- Francis Zachariae (1852–1936), Danish businessman, local historic publisher and philanthropist
- Karl Salomo Zachariae von Lingenthal (1769–1843), German jurist
- Karl Eduard Zachariae von Lingenthal (1812–1894), German jurist

== See also ==
- Zachariae Isstrom, a large glacier located in King Frederick VIII Land, northeast Greenland
