= Landesgymnasium =

The following schools have the name Landesgymnasium:

- Landesgymnasium für Hochbegabte Schwäbisch Gmünd, Baden-Württemberg
- Landesgymnasium für Musik Wernigerode, Saxony-Anhalt
- Sächsisches Landesgymnasium für Musik Carl Maria von Weber, Dresden, Saxony
- Sächsisches Landesgymnasium Sankt Afra zu Meißen, Saxony
