= Friedrich Gottlieb Barth =

German philologist and writer (1738–1794)

- Born: 3 August 1738; Wittenberg
- Died: 6 October 1794 (aged 56)
- Occupations: Philologist and writer

Friedrich Gottlieb Barth (3 August 1738 – 6 October 1794) was a German philologist and writer. He was born in Wittenberg, the son of Johann Christian Barth and his wife Catarina Elisabeth (née Krause).

His academic prowess earned him a place at the Landes- und Fürstenschule Grimma. He subsequently studied philosophy at the University of Wittenberg, and, after a spell at a local school, took up a teaching post at Schulpforte in 1767, where he remained until his death.

== Selected works ==
- Kurzgefaßte Spanische Grammatik (in German). Kayser. 1778.
