= Schnepfenthal Salzmann School =

- Salzmannschule Schnepfenthal
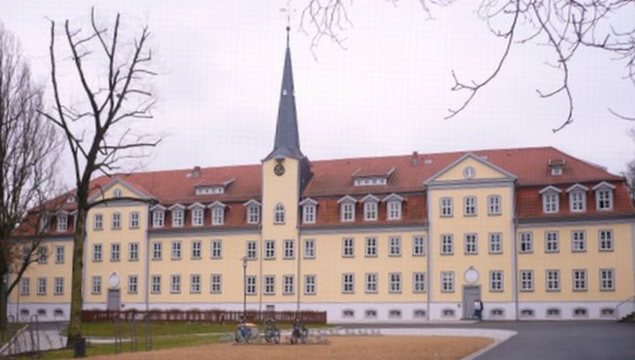

Location
- Klostermühlenweg 2 Waltershausen, Thuringia, 99880; Germany; 50°53′0″N 10°34′26″E

Information
- Type: Public boarding school
- Established: 1784; 242 years ago
- Headmaster: Dirk Schmidt
- Teaching staff: 46 (2009/10)
- Years: 5-12
- Gender: Co-educational
- Enrollment: 393 (2009/10)
- Average class size: 16
- Student to teacher ratio: 8:1
- Abitur average: 1.4

Founded in 1784, the Schnepfenthal Institution (Salzmannschule Schnepfenthal) is a specialized boarding school for languages located in the Waltershausen district of Gotha, Germany on the northern slopes of the Thuringian forest, near Castle Reinhardsbrunn.

In addition to compulsory education in English and German, students in 6th grade choose from Arabic, Chinese and Japanese. Latin is taught in 5th grade, and the student may continue studying Latin throughout his education at the Salzmannschool, if he wishes. In year 8, students must choose from French, Italian, Russian, and Spanish. 9th grade students have to choose among three of those four languages again, depending on which language they began studying in year 8.

It is amongst a handful of government supported schools specifically catering to the academically talented in Germany, along with institutions such as Pforta and the Landesgymnasium für Hochbegabte Schwäbisch Gmünd. To gain admission, prospective students have to pass a special entrance examination facilitated by faculty from the University of Erfurt.

== History ==
The linguist and theologian Christian Gotthilf Salzmann founded the school in 1784, with the intention to focus on languages, practical work and physical exercise. Salzmann was an influential theorist in childhood education, and his treatise 'Elements of Morality' was translated into the English language by the 18th century British feminist philosopher Mary Wollstonecraft. In the book Child of the Enlightenment, Rotterdam University professors Arianne Baggerman and Rudolf Dekker stated:

"We know a lot about the ideological basis of Salzmann's school, because he outlined it in a detailed prospectus published in 1785. He began by stating that for the last fifteen years, people had been waking up to the fact that much of the 'wretchedness and misery' in the world had been caused by a misspent education. Like the other philanthropists, he was keenly aware of being an innovator. He chose the village of Schnepfenthal because, he said, it was 'not situated so close to the city that it could be badly influenced by it, yet it was close enough to allow the pupils to associate with upright, enlightened and cultivated people'."

The support of the Freemasons of Gotha and the patronage of Leopold III, Duke of Anhalt-Dessau were also integral to the founding of the school. Leopold III was a noted liberal and social reformer, who also supported the founding of the first Jewish newspaper in Germany.

Since its early days, the school was internationally known as a pioneer in education and was visited by many pedagogues and intellectuals including Johann Wolfgang von Goethe and Christoph Martin Wieland. The husband of Queen Victoria, Albert, Prince Consort, was frequently sent there as a boy to play with the students.

== Teachers and alumni ==
Some of the people who have taught or studied there include

- Christian Carl Andre, leading 19th century European naturalist and pioneer of the biological concept of heredity whose vision paved the way for the research of Gregor Mendel, the founder of modern genetics
- Hans Domizlaff, the only disciple of the artist Max Klinger; Germany's first guru on advertising and public branding; instrumental in helping Carl Friedrich von Siemens establish Siemens as a mass market consumer brand in the 1930s
- Johann Christoph Friedrich GutsMuths, founder of modern gymnastics whose ideas were adopted by schools and universities throughout Britain and the United States in the 19th century
- Edward C. Hegeler, wealthy German-American industrialist and philanthropist; founded The Monist, one of America's oldest and most important journals on philosophy
- Christian Paulsen, law professor, politician and Danish nationalist
- Carl Ritter, founder of scientific geography; co-founder of the Geographic Society of Berlin; mentored explorers such as America geographer and Princeton professor Arnold Guyot, China explorer Ferdinand von Richthofen, and Africa explorer Heinrich Barth
- Ferdinand Springer, businessman who inherited a four-employee firm and with his father Julius Springer built it into the world's largest publisher of science, technology and medicine journals; Springer Science+Business Media was acquired by BC Partners in 2013 for €3.3 billion.
- Herbert Beerbohm Tree, English actor-manager, was educated at the school

== See also ==
- Landesgymnasium für Hochbegabte Schwäbisch Gmünd, in Baden-Württemberg
- Internatsschule Schloss Hansenberg, in Hesse
- Landesschule Pforta, in Saxony-Anhalt
- Landesgymnasium St. Afra, in Saxony
