= Wilhelm Knabe =

German politician (1923–2021)

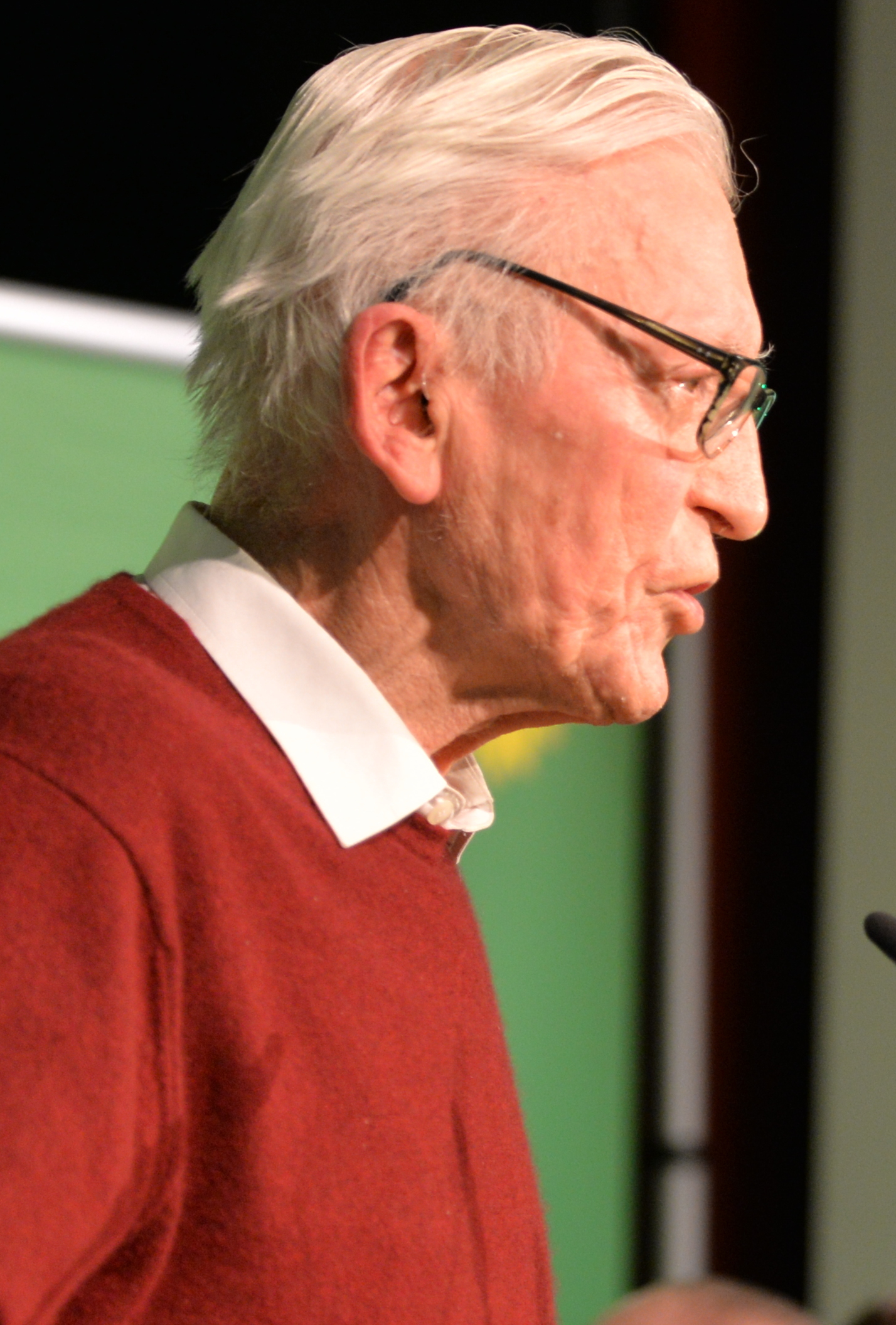
- Knabe in 2014
- Born: 8 October 1923; Arnsdorf, Saxony, Germany
- Died: 30 January 2021 (aged 97); Mülheim an der Ruhr, North Rhine-Westphalia, Germany
- Occupations: Agrarian scientist; Ecologist; Politician
- Organizations: Humboldt University; Bundestag
- Political party: Christian Democratic Union (East Germany) (1946–1959); Christian Democratic Union of Germany (1959–1966); Green Party (1978–2021)
- Awards: Order of Merit of North Rhine-Westphalia; Order of Merit of the Republic of Poland; Order of Merit of the Federal Republic of Germany

Wilhelm Knabe (8 October 1923 – 30 January 2021) was a German ecologist, pacifist, civil servant and politician, remembered as a founding member of the Green Party in Germany, and a pioneer of conservation of the environment who shaped the party for decades.

Knabe studied forest management in the German Democratic Republic (GDR). As an assistant at the Humboldt University, he focused on the recultivation after brown coal mining. Knabe left East Germany in 1959, settling in Mülheim, West Germany with his family, where he worked for a state agency for ecology. He had been a member of the Christian Democratic Union of Germany (CDU) from 1946, because it represented his Christian ethics, but left the party in 1966, unwilling to support its belief in economic growth and nuclear energy. In 1978, he was a co-founder of the Green Party in Germany, standing for conservation of the environment and world peace. He was party speaker on a federal level, a member of the Bundestag from 1987 to 1990, and vice mayor of Mülheim from 1994 to 1999.

== Life and career ==
Knabe was born in October 1923 in Arnsdorf, near Dresden, the seventh of nine children of a Protestant theologian. His father directed a facility for children with learning difficulties. He died trying to protect these children from the Nazi euthanasia programs in 1940, when Wilhelm was age 16. The younger Knabe joined the Luftwaffe after his Abitur at the Fürstenschule St. Afra in Meißen, and served for three years. After World War II, he became a member of the Christian Democratic Union (CDU) from 1946. He studied forest management (Forstwirtschaft) at the Forstliche Hochschule in Tharandt near Dresden, and completed his studies with a doctorate in agrarian science at the Humboldt University in Berlin. During his studies, he founded a group for preservation of the environment in 1949, together with other students, but the SED government of the German Democratic Republic (GDR) soon suppressed it. As assistant at the Humboldt University, he focused on plans for the recultivation after brown coal mining, the topic of his dissertation, but they were not put into practice.

Knabe left East Germany in 1959, with his pregnant wife and three children. The family settled in North Rhine-Westphalia, West Germany, where he joined the Christian Democratic Union, as it represented his Christian ethics. He left the party in 1966 because he could no longer support its belief in unrestrained economic growth, building of highways, and support of nuclear energy. Knabe worked from the mid-1960s in a leading position for the Landesanstalt für Ökologie, a state agency for ecology, in Recklinghausen, moving to Mülheim in 1967. He headed a project developing strategies to fight Waldsterben (death of the forests). In the 1970s, he supported oppositional groups in the GDR, such as ecological groups, initiatives for international development, and especially the Umwelt-Bibliothek (ecological library) in Berlin and the Ökologischer Arbeitskreis (ecological work group) in Dresden.

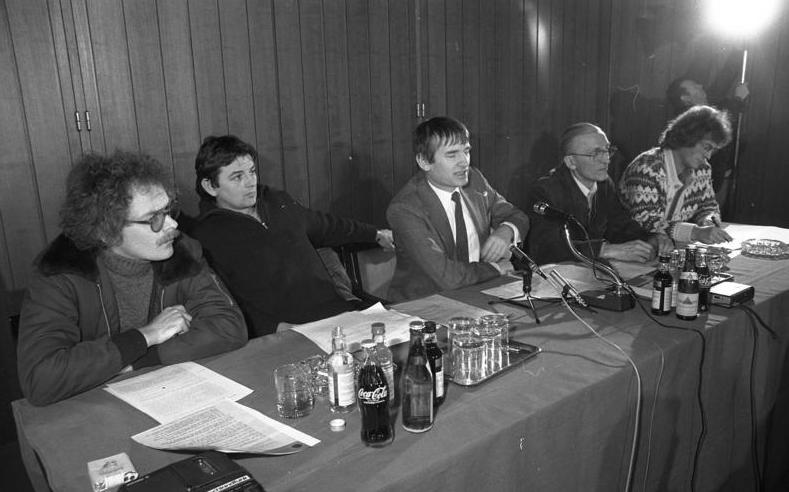
From left: Jürgen Reents, Joschka Fischer, Otto Schily, Wilhelm Knabe and Rainer Trampert in 1983

Knabe was a co-founder of the Green Party in Germany in 1978. He stood for conservation of the environment and world peace, and against nuclear deterrence and the arms race in the East and West. In 1979, he was a co-founder of the party in North Rhine-Westphalia, where he was the party's first speaker. He served as one of three speakers of the Greens at the federal level (Sprecher des Bundesverbandes) from November 1982 until December 1984. In the 1980s, he developed a system for the analysis of forest health by monitoring data from 26 areas over a long period. The concept became a standard in Germany. Knabe was a Member of the Bundestag from 1987 until 1990. Beginning in 1991, he collaborated with a students' ecological initiative (Umweltinitiative) at the Technische Universität Dresden. He was vice mayor of the city of Mülheim from 1994 to 1999, where he formed the first black-green coalition in Germany. He focused there on projects of culture and education.

Knabe was married, and the couple had four children. Their son Hubertus Knabe became a historian. In 2019, Wilhelm Knabe published an autobiography titled Erinnerungen – Ein deutsch-deutsches Leben (Memories − a German-German life). He read literature to children at the Kloster Saarn educational facility. He joined Friday For Future demonstrations showing a poster "Opa for future – ihr seid nicht allein" (Grandpa for future – you are not alone).

Knabe died in Mülheim an der Ruhr, at age 97, from a COVID-19 infection during the COVID-19 pandemic in Germany.

== Publications ==
Knabe's publications are held by the German National Library:

- Untersuchungen über die Voraussetzungen der Rekultivierung von Kippen im Braunkohlenbergbau (dissertation). Berlin 1957.
- Zur Wiederurbarmachung im Braunkohlenbergbau. Allgemeine Darstellung des Problems der Wiederurbarmachung und spezielle Untersuchungen im Lausitzer Braunkohlenbergbau. Berlin 1959.
- with others: Haldenbegrünung im Ruhrgebiet. No. 22 of the series Schriftenreihe Siedlungsverband Ruhrkohlenbezirk. Essen 1968.
- Immissionsökologische Waldzustandserfassung in Nordrhein-Westfalen (IWE 1979). Fichten und Flechten als Zeiger der Waldgefährdung durch Luftverunreinigungen., No. 37 of the series Forschung und Beratung. Reihe C, Wissenschaftliche Berichte und Diskussionsbeiträge. Münster 1983.
- with Gerd Cousen and others: Regionale Verteilung einiger Nähr- und Schadstoffgehalte in Fichtennadeln. Schätzungen anhand von Analysen dreijähriger Nadeln aus der bundesweiten "Immissionsökologischen Waldzustandserfassung 1983". No. 360 of the series Schriftenreihe des Bundesministers für Ernährung, Landwirtschaft und Forsten. Reihe A, Angewandte Wissenschaft. Münster-Hiltrup 1988, ISBN 3-7843-0360-9.
- Erinnerungen – Ein deutsch-deutsches Leben. Dr. Krosse-Verlag, Mülheim an der Ruhr 2019, ISBN 978-3-9813807-3-6.

== Awards ==
- 2007 – Order of Merit of North Rhine-Westphalia
- 2008 – Order of Merit of the Republic of Poland
- 2014 – Officer's cross of the Order of Merit of the Federal Republic of Germany

Knabe was honorary president of the Kreisverband Bündnis 90/Die Grünen in Mülheim an der Ruhr.
