= Gymnasium St. Augustine =

Gymnasium St. Augustine in Grimma
- Gymnasium St. Augustin zu Grimma
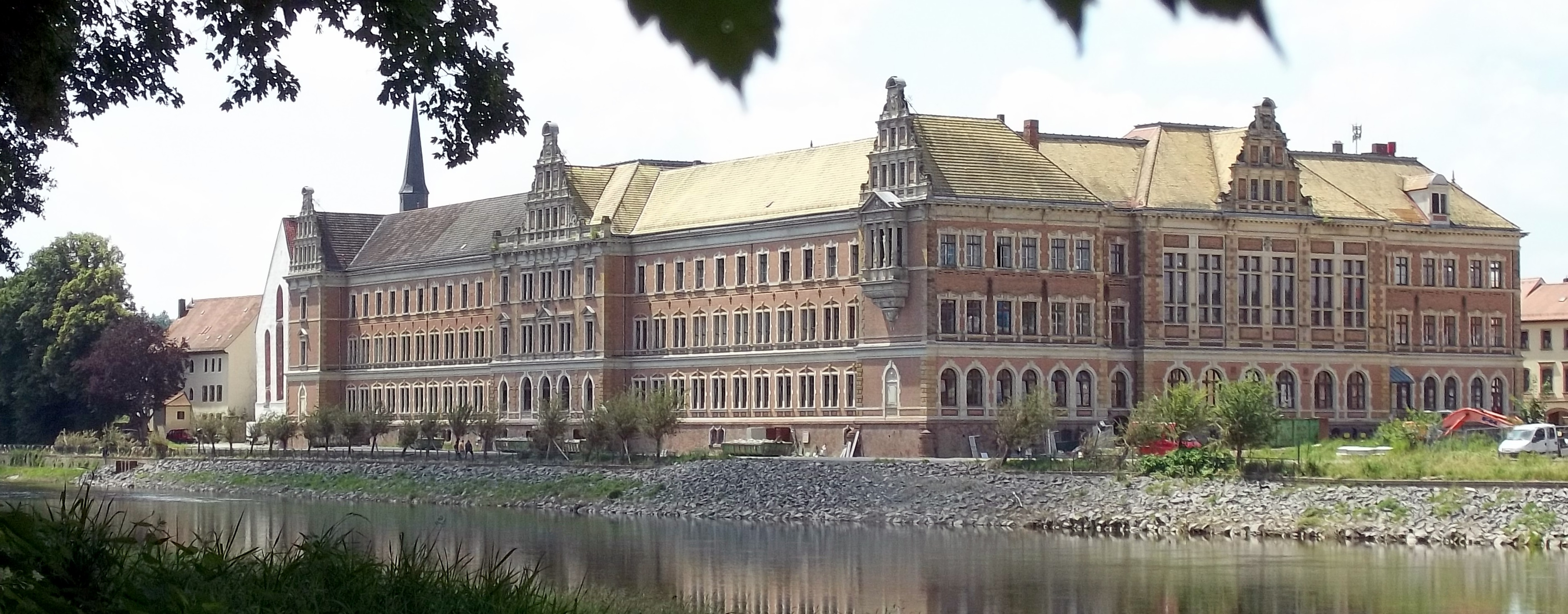
- Gymnasium St. Augustine seen from Mulde river

Location
- Klosterstraße 1; 04668 Grimma; Landkreis Leipzig; Germany
- Coordinates: 51.2358°N 12.7312°E

Information
- Type: gymnasium
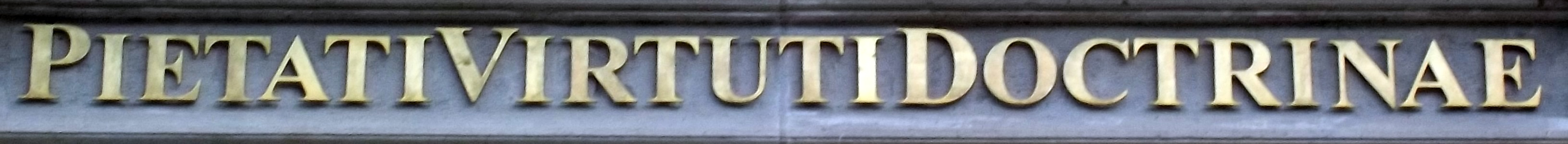
- Motto
- Established: 14 September 1550
- Principal: Wolf-Dieter Goecke
- Faculty: 77 (2015/2016)
- Years offered: 5–12
- Enrollment: 897 (2015/2016)
- Color: purple – white – green
- Newspaper: Augustiner Blätter
- Website: http://www.staugustin.de

Gymnasium St. Augustine in Grimma (Gymnasium St. Augustin zu Grimma, historically known as Landes- und Fürstenschule Grimma is the only regular gymnasium offering boarding in Saxony. It is heavily steeped in tradition as one of the foremost schools in the country. Founded in 1550 as one of the three Fürstenschulen in Saxony, it has prepared young people for university studies since then.

== History ==
=== Foundation ===
Following the Protestant Reformation, Maurice, Elector of Saxony had the school founded in 1550 as the third of the Fürstliche Landesschulen ("Princely State Schools") after St. Afra in Meißen and Pforta near Naumburg (founded in 1543) with the aim of educating able and reliable scholars for the evangelical church and the administration of the Saxon lands. These schools contributed substantially to the stabilisation of the Reformation and the Lutheran church, the role of the Saxon parsonages, and the cultural development of Saxony. Originally, the new school was to be established in Merseburg, but persistent opposition from the catholic bishop of Merseburg led to the decision to locate it in the former Augustine monastery in Grimma which had been left by the monks in 1541. After the river Mulde it was also called Collegium Moldanum. The first rector was the humanist Adam Siber (1516–1584) who applied the rules - including the compulsory use of the Latin language - of a school in Chemnitz of which he had been rector before.

=== 16th to 19th century ===
During the first four centuries of its existence Fürstenschule Grimma mainly prepared students for careers as civil servants or theologians. They usually went on to study at Leucorea or at Leipzig University. After the Thirty Years' War, the Fürstenschule bought the manor of former Buch Abbey. Due to the increasing number of students, the old building was demolished in 1820 and replaced by a new one which was opened in 1828. Even though this also proved insufficient, the Saxon ministry of education rejected further petitions for extensions until 1874, when King Albert of Saxony visited the school and approved of the proposals. Flood protection requirements demanded a completely new building. It was designed by state architect Hugo Nauck (1837–1894) in the Neo-renaissance style. The plans were approved in 1886 by the Landtag, construction started in 1887 and was finished in 1891.

=== 20th century ===
After World War I the school was transformed into a reformed gymnasium of republican orientation. While it was brought into line with state politics by the National Socialist government by decree in 1936, the rector successfully intervened against a transformation into a Napola. From then on the school was officially called Fürstenschule Grimma – Staatliche Oberschule für Jungen. It had 144 boarders at that time, a small number of students also lived in the households of teachers in Grimma. Lessons in Greek were stopped in 1939, thereby ending almost 400 years of tradition. When the remaining students were drafted for auxiliary war services, regular school operations stopped on 25 February 1943 Due to events of World War II, the school also hosted female students of Nossen teachers college from 14 April 1942. From 5 December 1943 until the end of the war the school was temporarily home to the St Thomas Choir of Leipzig. It opened again on 1 October 1945 on orders of the Soviet Military Administration in Germany. From then on, girls were also admitted.

With the approval of the administration of Saxony, Landesschule Grimma and the local state secondary school (Staatliche Oberschule Grimma) were merged in September 1946. The combined school was reformed according to the law regarding the democratisation of the German school of 1946 and the law regarding the socialist development of the school system in the GDR of 1959.

Following an initiative which started in 1949, the school was renamed after a prominent former student into Dr.-Wilhelm-Külz-Schule in 1953 Another renaming into Wilhelm-Pieck-Oberschule after the first president of the GDR was proposed in 1960. Beginning with school year 1960/1961, the school was officially transformed into an Extended Secondary School (EOS). On 4 Oktober 1974 it was renamed into Erweiterte Oberschule Ernst Schneller Grimma after a prominent antifascist.

Having been simply called Erweiterte Oberschule Grimma from September 1990 as a consequence of the political changes of 1989/1990, the school was officially named Gymnasium St. Augustin zu Grimma with the start of school year 1992/1993. Unlike its sister schools in Meißen and Pforta, however, it did not regain the rank of a Landesschule, i.e. of an elite state gymnasium.

In 1997 the 387th episode of the German TV series Tatort, titled Fürstenschüler was filmed on the grounds of the school. The film received controversial feedback, especially among teachers and alumni, because if featured a story of homosexual relationships between school personal and pupils.

=== 21st century ===
After the gymnasiums in Colditz and Bad Lausick were closed, and St Augustine merged with Johann-Gottfried-Seume-Gymnasium in Grimma, the school is the only regular gymnasium in the region. It currently consists of the parent house Moldanum in Klosterstraße where years 8 to 12 are taught and the Seume-Haus (the home of former Johann-Gottfried-Seume-Gymnasium) in Colditzer Straße for years 5 to 7. School events are chronicled in the yearbook Augustiner Blätter Jahrbuch. Due to its location near the river Mulde, the Moldanum has repeatedly suffered damage from floods, such as the 2002 and 2013 European floods. There are currently 50 residential places for students.

=== The school bell ===
The original school bell was lost in World War I when it was removed to provide raw materials for the war. In 1925 it was replaced by the bell of the neighbouring Augustinians' church which dates from 1491. Officially, it was not rung any more from 1952 on, its duties having been completely replaced by an electric bell which had already been used in parallel. 1974 the bell was moved into the town's archive, from 1989 to 1993 it was stored in the district museum. In 1993 the church roof was renewed, and the bell was hung in the turret again. Despite the installation of an electric ringing mechanism, it was not officially rung again for several years, giving rise to the local opinion that the clapper was missing. However, the bell had been rung after the flood of 2002, and in 2014 a teacher provided photographic evidence that the bell is in working order. Since then, it has been rung on special occasions.

== Notable students ==
- Karl Ludwig Drobisch (1803–1854), German composer, music theorist and church musician
- Paul Gerhardt (1607–1676), Protestant theologist and author of hymns
- Samuel von Pufendorf (1632–1694), philosopher and historian
- Friedrich Gottlieb Barth (1738–1794), philologist and pedagogue
- Ernst Chladni (1756–1827), physicist
- Paul Clemen (1866–1946), art historian
- Wilhelm Külz (1875–1948), politician
- Walter Andrae (1875–1956), archeologist
- Karl-Heinz Rosch (1926-1944), soldier
- Carmen Nebel (born 1956), TV presenter
- Olaf Beyer (born 1957), sportsman

== Gallery ==
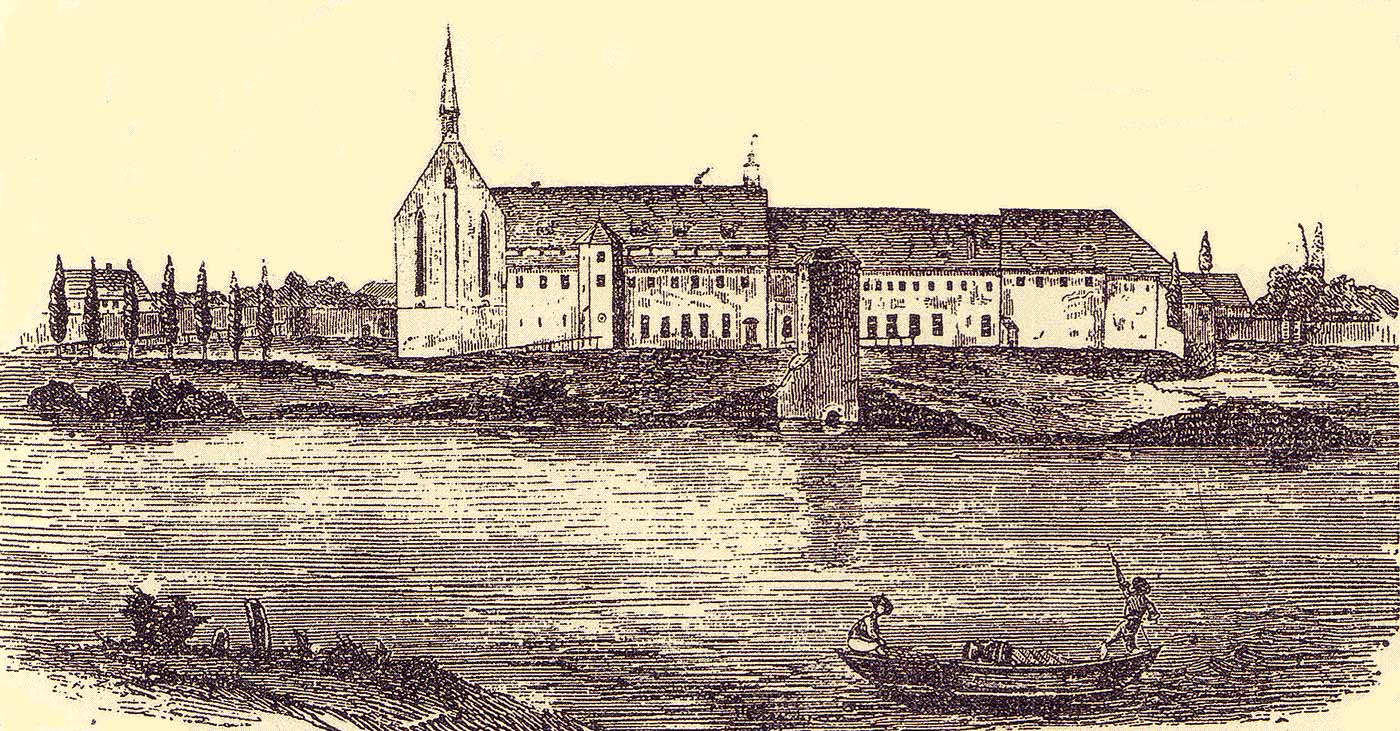
Collegium Moldanum in the 17th century

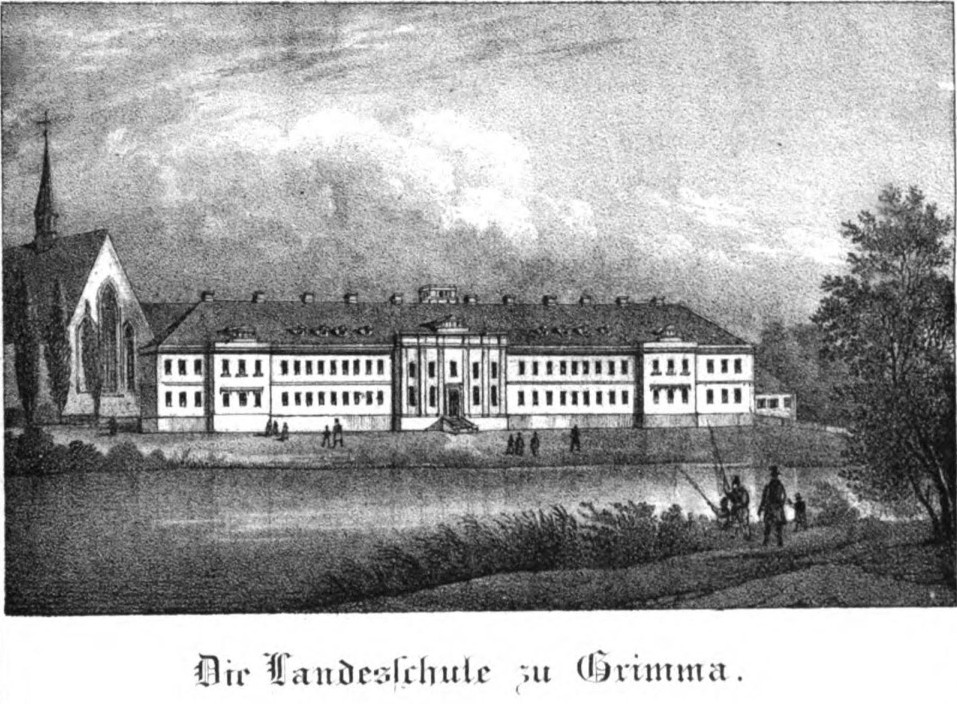
The second building of 1828

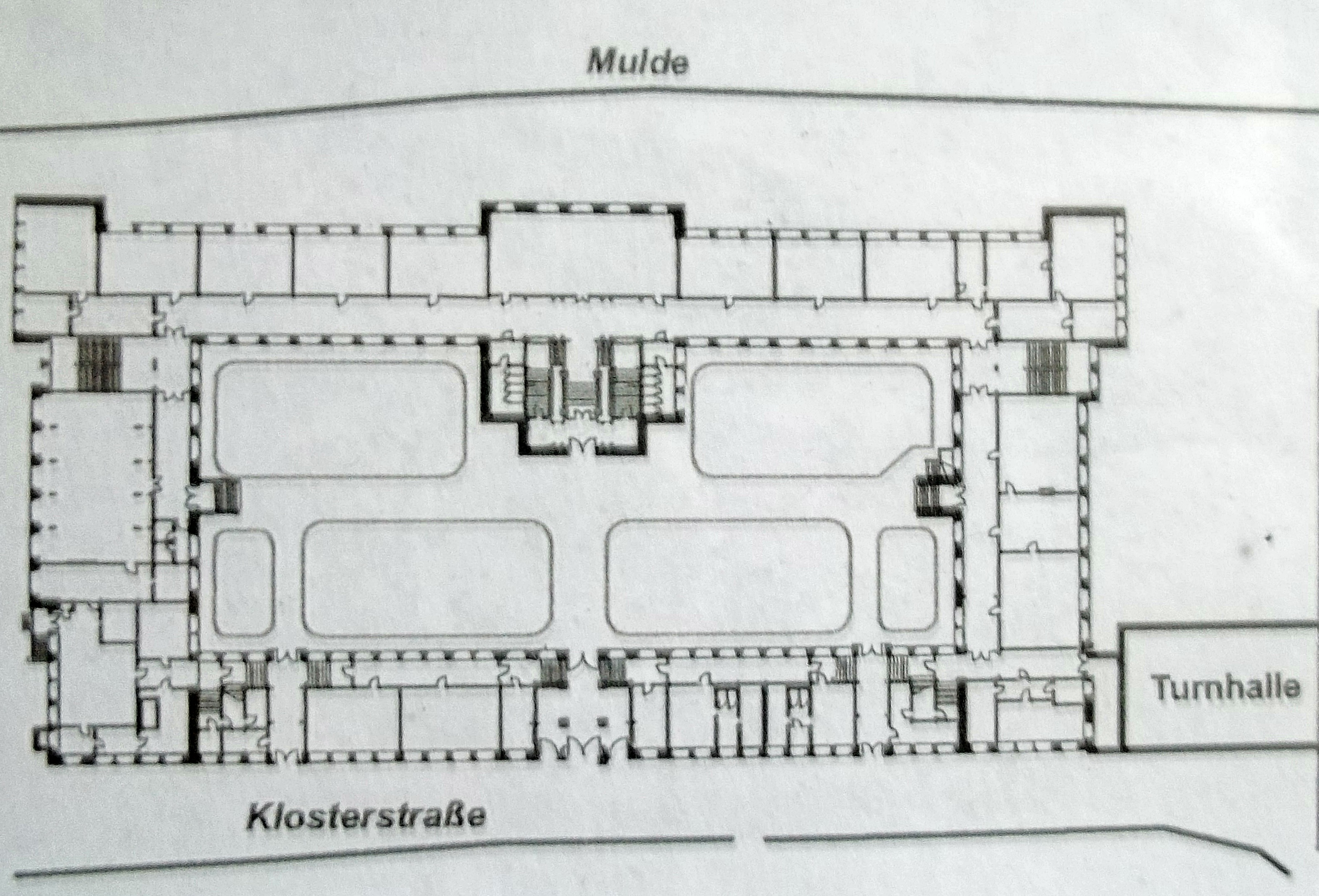
Ground floor plan of main building

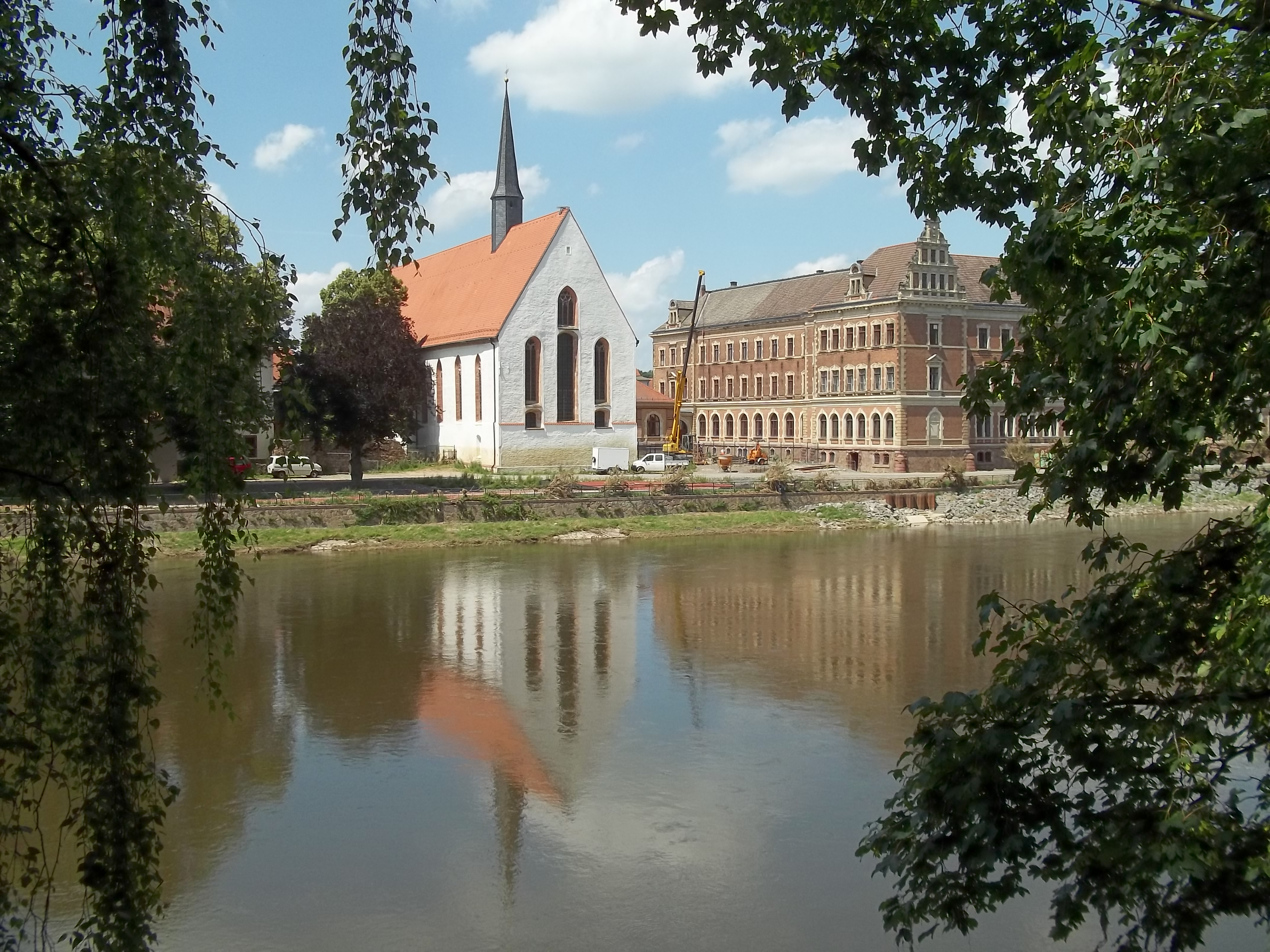
Augustinians' church and gymnasium in 2013

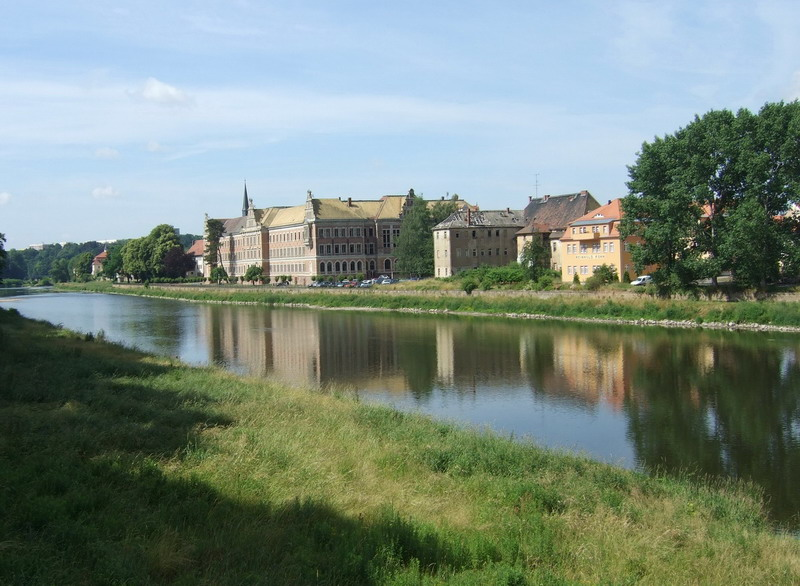
Gymnasum seen from the bridge across Mulde river

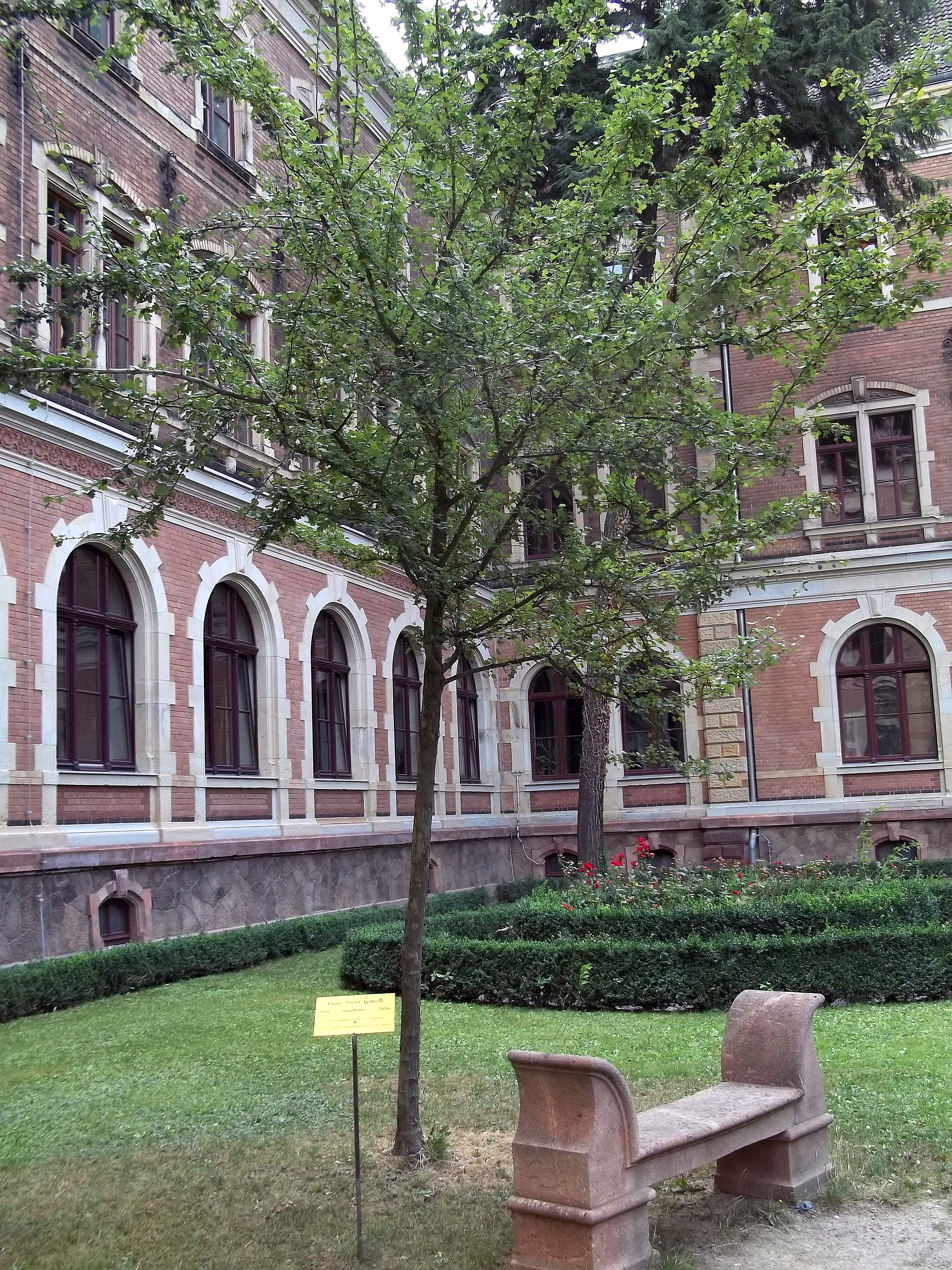
Courtyard

== Bibliography ==
- Kurt Schwabe (2000). "Die Rektoren der Fürsten- und Landesschule St. Augustin zu Grimma und ihre bedeutendsten Persönlichkeiten". In Friedrich Wermuth, Karl Irmscher (ed.). Von der kurfürstlichen Landesschule zum Gymnasium St. Augustin zu Grimma 1550–2000. Beucha: Sax-Verlag Beucha. pp. 37–41. ISBN 3-930076-99-3.
- Von der kurfürstlichen Landesschule zum Gymnasium St. Augustin zu Grimma 1550-2000. Beucha: Sax-Verlag. 2000. ISBN 3-930076-99-3.
- Gerhard Arnhardt, Gerd-Bodo Reinert (2002). Die Fürsten- und Landesschulen Meißen, Schulpforte und Grimma : Lebensweise und Unterricht über Jahrhundert. Schriftenreihe des Weltbundes für Erneuerung der Erziehung. Vol. 5. Basel: Weinheim. ISBN 3-407-32015-9.
