= Hubertus Knabe =

German historian (born 1959)

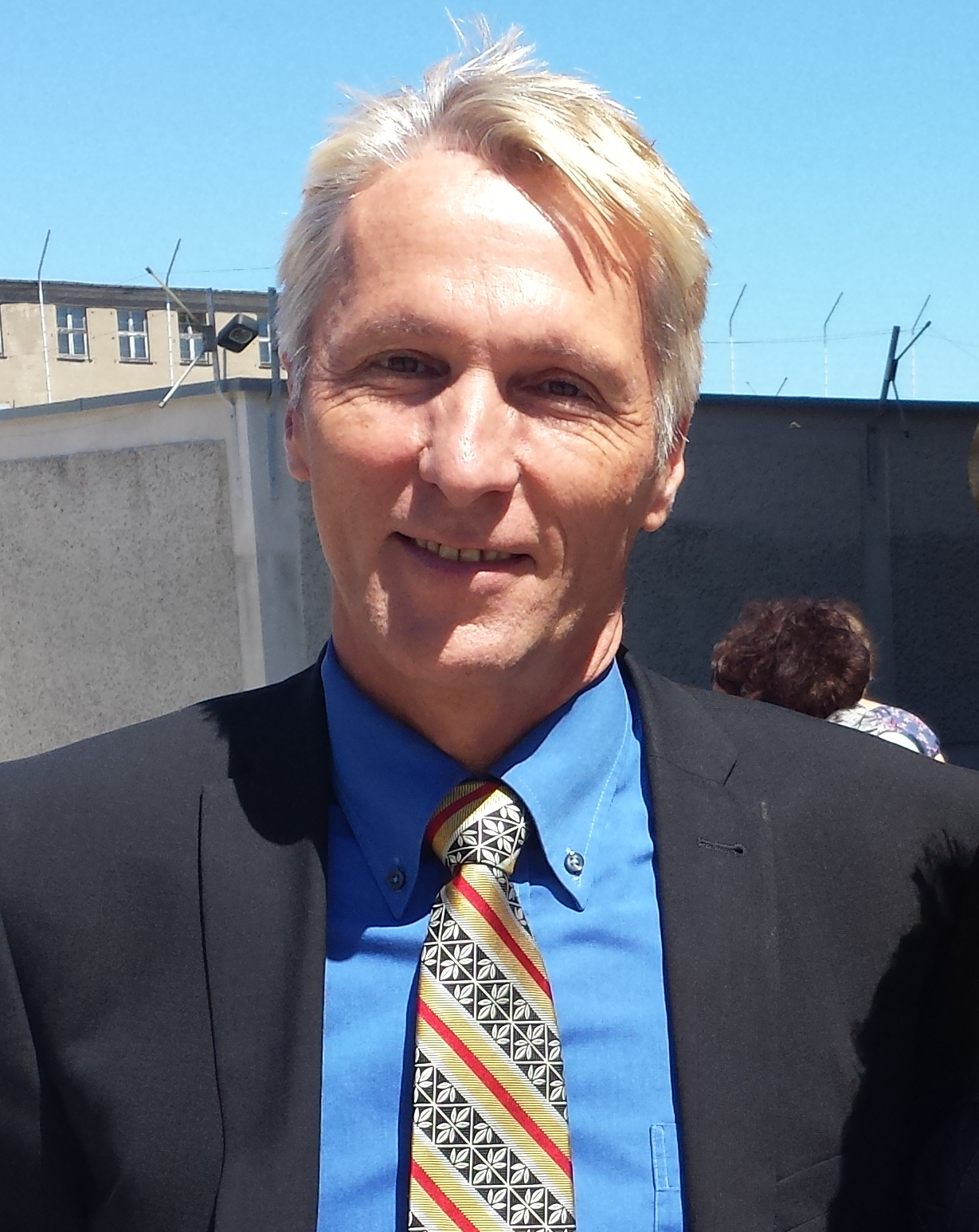
- Knabe in 2015
- Born: 1959 (age 66–67); Unna, North Rhine-Westphalia, West Germany
- Education: Freie Universität Berlin
- Occupations: Historian; Museum director
- Organizations: Berlin-Hohenschönhausen Memorial
- Political party: Green Party

Hubertus Knabe (born 1959) is a German historian and was the scientific director of the Berlin-Hohenschönhausen Memorial, a museum and memorial in a notorious former Stasi torture prison in Berlin. Knabe is noted for several works on oppression in the former Communist states of Eastern Europe, particularly in East Germany. He became involved with green politics, and was active in the Alliance '90/The Greens.

== Early life and career ==
Knabe's parents fled East Germany in 1959, and Knabe was born that year and grew up in Unna, North Rhine-Westphalia. His father was the noted ecologist Wilhelm Knabe, later a co-founder and chairman of the German Greens. Knabe was active in the peace movement, and he founded in 1978 a committee in support of Rudolf Bahro, a German philosopher imprisoned in East Germany. Because of his political activities, he was declared persona non grata in East Germany between 1980 and 1987. Knabe served as press spokesman of the Green Party in Bremen from 1983. He obtained a doctoral degree in history at the Freie Universität Berlin. From 1992 to 2000, he worked in the research department of the Federal Commissioner for the Stasi Records. In 2001, he was appointed scientific director of the Berlin-Hohenschönhausen Memorial.

== Political views ==
Knabe is committed to not allowing the crimes committed by the East German government to be forgotten. He said: "Not until the Communist dictatorship is as firmly in mind in Germany as the criminal regime of the Nazis will we really have succeeded in coming to terms with the legacy of Stasi minister Erich Mielke."

Knabe has called for more outspoken anti-communism in German society, and has particularly called upon the Social Democratic Party of Germany (SPD) party to identify with its anti-communist tradition and oppose the Party of Democratic Socialism (PDS), the legal successor of the ruling Socialist Unity Party of Germany (SED), which was Marxist–Leninist, as part of its reformist legacy. He has argued that SPD members were the first victims of the Communist dictatorship in East Germany. According to Knabe, "every democrat is an anti-communist". With the avowed intent to call the East German regime to account, Knabe supports pro-business and anti-socialist views. In a blog post, he criticized the red–red–green coalition of the Berlin state government for what he described as kowtowing to the extremism of Die Linke, which he alleged to be riddled with former SED and Stasi personnel intent on bringing back the old regime to the city-state.

== Publications ==
- (under the pseudonym "Klaus Ehring") Schwerter zu Pflugscharen. Friedensbewegung in der DDR. Rowohlt, Reinbek 1982, ISBN 3-499-15019-0 (with Ulrich Mickan, under the pseudonym "Martin Dallwitz")
- Aufbruch in eine andere DDR. Reformer und Oppositionelle zur Zukunft ihres Landes. Rowohlt, Reinbek 1989, ISBN 3-499-12607-9
- Umweltkonflikte im Sozialismus. Möglichkeiten und Grenzen gesellschaftlicher Problemartikulation in sozialistischen Systemen. Eine vergleichende Analyse der Umweltdiskussion in der DDR und Ungarn. Verlag Wissenschaft und Politik, Cologne 1993, ISBN 3-8046-8791-1
- West-Arbeit des MfS. Das Zusammenspiel von „Aufklärung“ und „Abwehr“. Ch. Links Verlag, Berlin 1999, ISBN 3-86153-182-8
- Die unterwanderte Republik. Stasi im Westen. Propyläen, Berlin 1999. paperback edition: ISBN 3-548-36284-2
- Der diskrete Charme der DDR. Stasi und Westmedien. Propyläen, Berlin 2001. paperback edition: ISBN 3-548-36389-X
- 17. Juni 1953. Ein deutscher Aufstand. Propyläen, Berlin 2003, ISBN 3-549-07182-5
- Stätten der DDR-Diktatur. Gedenkstätte Berlin-Hohenschönhausen, Forschungs- und Gedenkstätte Normannenstraße, AlliiertenMuseum, Deutsch-Russisches Museum Karlshorst, Erinnerungsstätte Notaufnahmelager Marienfelde, Gedenkstätte Berliner Mauer, Museum Haus am Checkpoint Charlie u.a.. Jaron, Berlin 2004, ISBN 3-89773-225-4
- Der verbotene Stadtteil. Stasi-Sperrbezirk Berlin-Hohenschönhausen. Jaron, Berlin 2005, ISBN 3-89773-506-7 (with Peter Erler)
- Tag der Befreiung? Das Kriegsende in Ostdeutschland. Propyläen, Berlin 2005, ISBN 3-549-07245-7
- Die Täter sind unter uns. Über das Schönreden der SED-Diktatur. Propyläen, Berlin 2007, ISBN 978-3-549-07302-5
- Gefangen in Hohenschönhausen. Stasihäftlinge berichten (editor). List Taschenbuch, 2007, ISBN 978-3-548-60741-2
- Honeckers Erben. Die Wahrheit über Die Linke. Propyläen, Berlin 2009, ISBN 978-3-549-07329-2
