= Blasius Höfel =

Austrian copperplate engraver (1792–1863)

- Theodor Höfel: My uncle Blasius; Vienna Museum 1853, oil painting 17cm x 13cm, Inventory number 61170
- Born: 27 May 1792; Vienna, Austrian Empire
- Died: 17 September 1863 (aged 71); Vienna, Austrian Empire
- Known for: Engraving
- Movement: Neoclassicism

Blasius Höfel (27 May 1792 – 17 September 1863) was an Austrian copper engraver.

== Life ==
Born in Vienna, Höfel studied drawing and painting from 1805 at the Akademie der bildenden Künste Wien with Hubert Maurer. From 1807 he devoted himself primarily to chalcography. His most famous work is a portrait of Ludwig van Beethoven, with whom he also had personal contact. Höfel's copperplate engraving was commissioned by the Artaria publishing house in 1814 & Comp. on the basis of a drawing by Louis-René Letronne. From 1820 to 1837 he worked as a drawing teacher at the military academy in Wiener Neustadt. On a study trip to Germany he met Friedrich Wilhelm Gubitz and afterwards he worked with different woodcut techniques. Around 1840 he invented the line etching.

Höfel died in Aigen bei Salzburg at the age of 71.

== Works (selection) ==
=== Copper engravings ===
- Die Flucht nach Ägypten after Joseph Hirschhäuter (1801–1859)
- Johannes d. T. in der Wüste after Raphael
- Der Leichnam Christi after Andrea del Sarto
- Rudolf von Habsburg an Ottokars Leiche after Anton Petter
- Der Abschied des Landwehrmanns after Johann Peter Krafft

=== Woodcuts ===
- Venus after Lebrun
- Die vier Evangelisten after Luca Giordano
Ludwig van Beethoven, lithograph by Blasius Höfel after the drawing by Louis Letronne, 1814

Christian Carl André, 1819

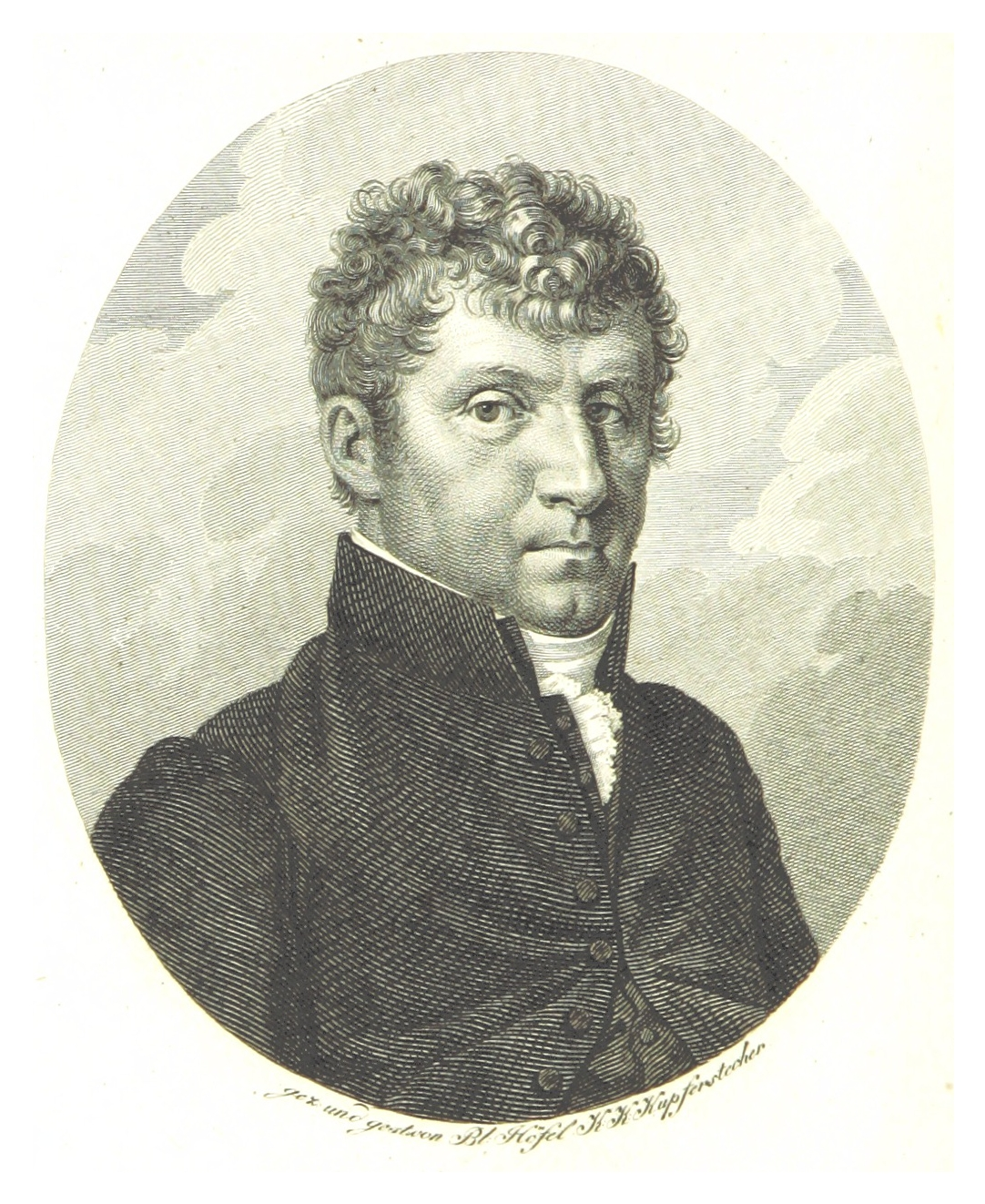
Felix Mießl, 1830

Carl Czerny, 1830

== Bibliography ==
- Constantin von Wurzbach: Höfel, Blasius. In Biographisches Lexikon des Kaiserthums Oesterreich 9th part. Kaiserlich-königliche Hof- und Staatsdruckerei, Vienna 1863, pp. 93–97 Höfel, Blasius Online
- Josef Wünsch: Blasius Höfel. Geschichte seines Lebens und seiner Kunst und Verzeichnis seiner Werke, Gesellschaft für vervielfältigende Kunst, Wien 1910 (Online-Version)
- "Höfel Blasius". In: Österreichisches Biographisches Lexikon 1815–1950 (ÖBL). Vol. 2, Austrian Academy of Sciences, Vienna 1959, p. 349 f. (Direct links to "p. 349", "p. 350")
