= Die Täter sind unter uns =

2007 book by Hubertus Knabe

Die Täter sind unter uns: Über das Schönreden der SED-Diktatur
- Author: Hubertus Knabe
- Language: de
- Publisher: Propyläen
- Publication date: 23 March 2007
- Media type: Print
- Pages: 384
- ISBN: 978-3-549-07302-5
- OCLC: 494271443
- LC Class: 2007425546

Die Täter sind unter uns: Über das Schönreden der SED-Diktatur (English: "The perpetrators are among us: On the euphemisation of the SED dictatorship") is a widely acclaimed non-fiction book by historian Hubertus Knabe, published in German by Propyläen in 2007. It deals with the legacy of the totalitarian communist dictatorship in East Germany, the lack of accountability for many communist perpetrators of crimes against humanity, and the whitewashing of the communist regime's history by the successor of the communist party ("The Left"). Knabe shows how human rights and international law were systematically violated by the communist regime, and attacks so-called Ostalgie, that is, tendencies to romanticize life in the communist dictatorship.
