= Berlin-Hohenschönhausen Memorial =

Museum and memorial located at former Stasi prison in Berlin

Coordinates: 52°32′30.3″N 13°30′5.4″E

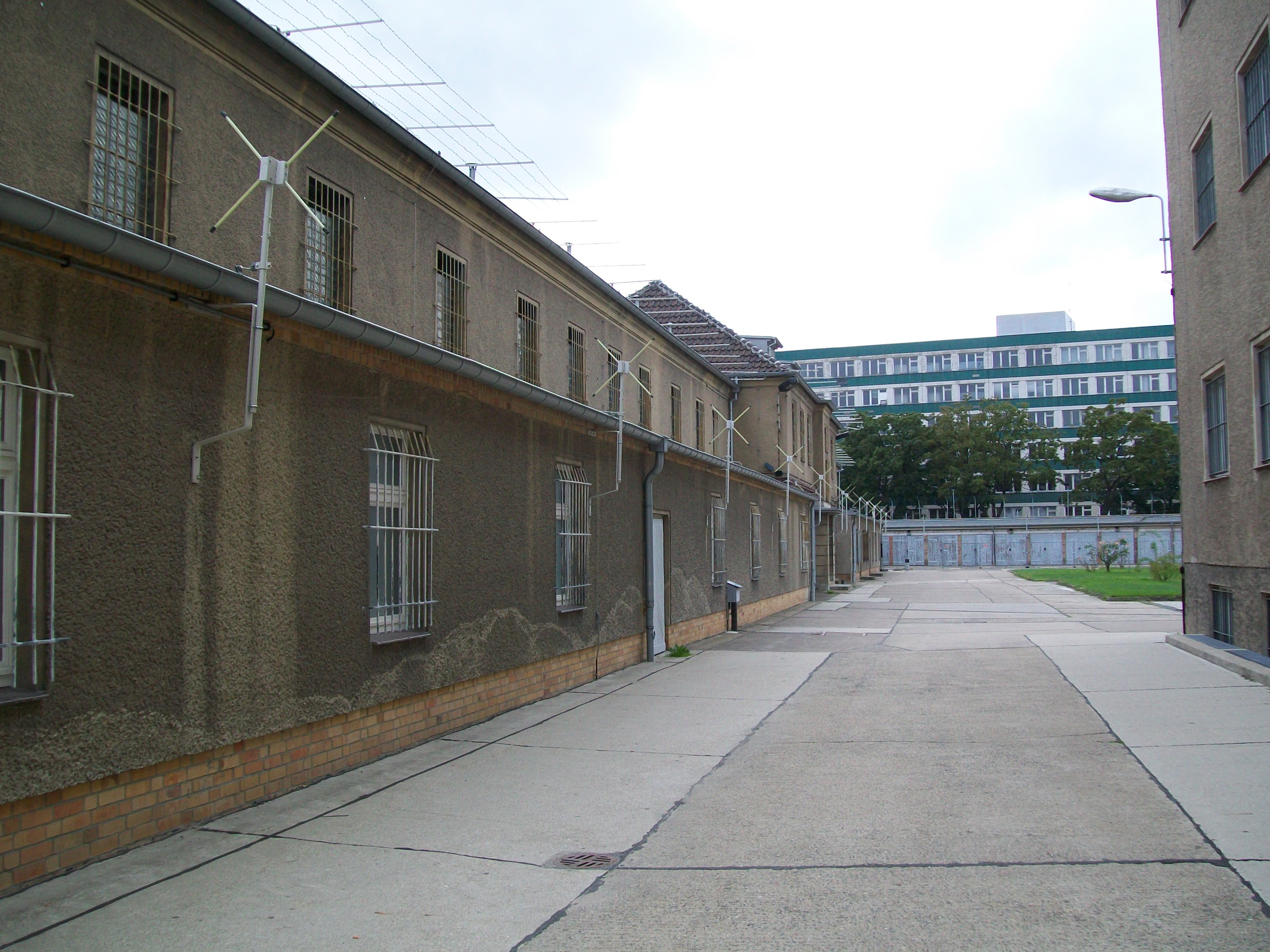
Hohenschönhausen Prison Complex

Berlin-Hohenschönhausen Memorial, Berlin

The Berlin-Hohenschönhausen Memorial (German: Gedenkstätte Berlin-Hohenschönhausen) is a museum and memorial located in Lichtenberg district, Berlin in the locality of Alt-Hohenschönhausen, part of the former borough of Hohenschönhausen. It was opened in 1994 on the site of the main political prison of the former East German Communist Ministry of State Security, the Stasi.

Unlike many other government and military institutions in East Germany, Hohenschönhausen prison was not stormed by demonstrators after the fall of the Berlin Wall, allowing prison authorities to destroy evidence of the prison's functions and history. Because of this, today's knowledge of the functioning of the prison comes mainly from eyewitness accounts and documents sourced from other East German institutions.

The prison was depicted in the 2006 film The Lives of Others, in 2017 TV series The Same Sky, in 2018 Amazon Prime series Deutschland 86, and in the 2020 series The Defeated. It is a member organisation of the Platform of European Memory and Conscience.

== History ==
=== Pre-World War II ===
The Hohenschönhausen area was largely industrial prior to World War II. The area later occupied by the main building housed a factory manufacturing supplies for the soup kitchens of the National Socialist People's Welfare organization. That red-brick building was completed in 1939.

=== Special Camp No. 3 ===
In June 1945, at the conclusion of World War II, the Soviet NKVD took over the Hohenschönhausen area of Lichtenberg and transformed it into a detention and transit camp, called Special Camp No. 3. The camp served as both a prison and transfer point. Over 20,000 people passed through Special Camp No. 3 on their way to other Soviet camps, including Heinrich George, who was brought to the Special Camp No. 7 in Sachsenhausen in 1946 where he died shortly afterwards.

Living conditions in the camp were deplorable, with death from malnutrition, disease, or common cold. Although official statistics list 886 deaths at the camp between July 1945 and October 1946, independent estimates put the toll as high as 3,000. Bodies were disposed of in local bomb craters.

The camp was closed and prisoners relocated to other camps in October 1946. After the closing of Special Camp No. 3, the Hohenschönhausen compound served as a Soviet prison during the winter of 1946–1947. The former cafeteria was converted to the underground prison area ("submarine") by prison labour.

=== Stasi Prison ===
The prison was reopened by the East German Ministry of State Security (MfS), also known as the Stasi, in 1951. The Stasi added a new prison building (using prisoner labour) in the late 1950s. The new building included 200 prison cells and interrogation rooms. After the construction of the Berlin Wall in 1961, the prison was primarily used to house those who wished or attempted to leave East Germany, although political prisoners were also held there. The prison was used until die Wende in 1989 and officially closed on 3 October 1990.

The main prison also included a hospital wing, built in the 1950s and expanded in 1972. The hospital treated prisoners from all three Berlin prisons and sometimes from regional Stasi prisons as well. The hospital had up to 28 beds (in cells), an X-ray ward, treatment, operating rooms, a morgue, and outdoor exercise cells (called "tiger cages" by prisoners). In 1989, shortly before its closure, the hospital was run by Dr. Herbert Vogel with 28 full-time Stasi staff.

== Political oppression ==
Hohenschönhausen was a very important part of East Germany's system of political oppression.

Although torture and physical violence were commonly employed at Hohenschönhausen (especially in the 1950s), psychological intimidation was the main method of political repression and techniques including sleep deprivation, total isolation, threats to friends and family members, and the use of cells that could be filled with water to prevent the prisoner from sitting or sleeping.

A suggested reason why the torture of East Germany's own citizenry was permitted for so long was the Hohenschönhausen exclusion zone. The prison was located in a large restricted area bordered by a large military town. Additionally, it officially did not exist during many of the years it operated, being left off all maps. These two measures combined meant that few people who did not work there knew what occurred inside. Because it was not well known, the prison was not stormed by demonstrators after the fall of the Wall. This allegedly allowed prison authorities to destroy much of the evidence of their activities. Today, much knowledge comes from former prisoners' personal accounts and documentation from other East German institutions.

== Memorial ==
The Hohenschönhausen Memorial (Gedenkstätte) was founded in the early 1990s by former inmates. The prison was listed as a historical site in 1992, and welcomed its first visitors in 1994. The Foundation is funded equally by both the German federal government and the Berlin state government.

The Foundation was initially headed by Gabriele Camphausen, then by Mechthild Günther, who served as provisional director until September 2000. Hubertus Knabe has since served as executive director.

The Foundation is open year-round, with hourly tours between 11:00 and 15:00 (10:00 – 16:00 at weekends). English-speaking tours are conducted three times a day (currently at 10:40, 12:40, and 14:40), year-round except some holidays. Visitors may tour in groups only, entrance fees range from €1, for students, to €6, the normal admission price.

== Photos ==
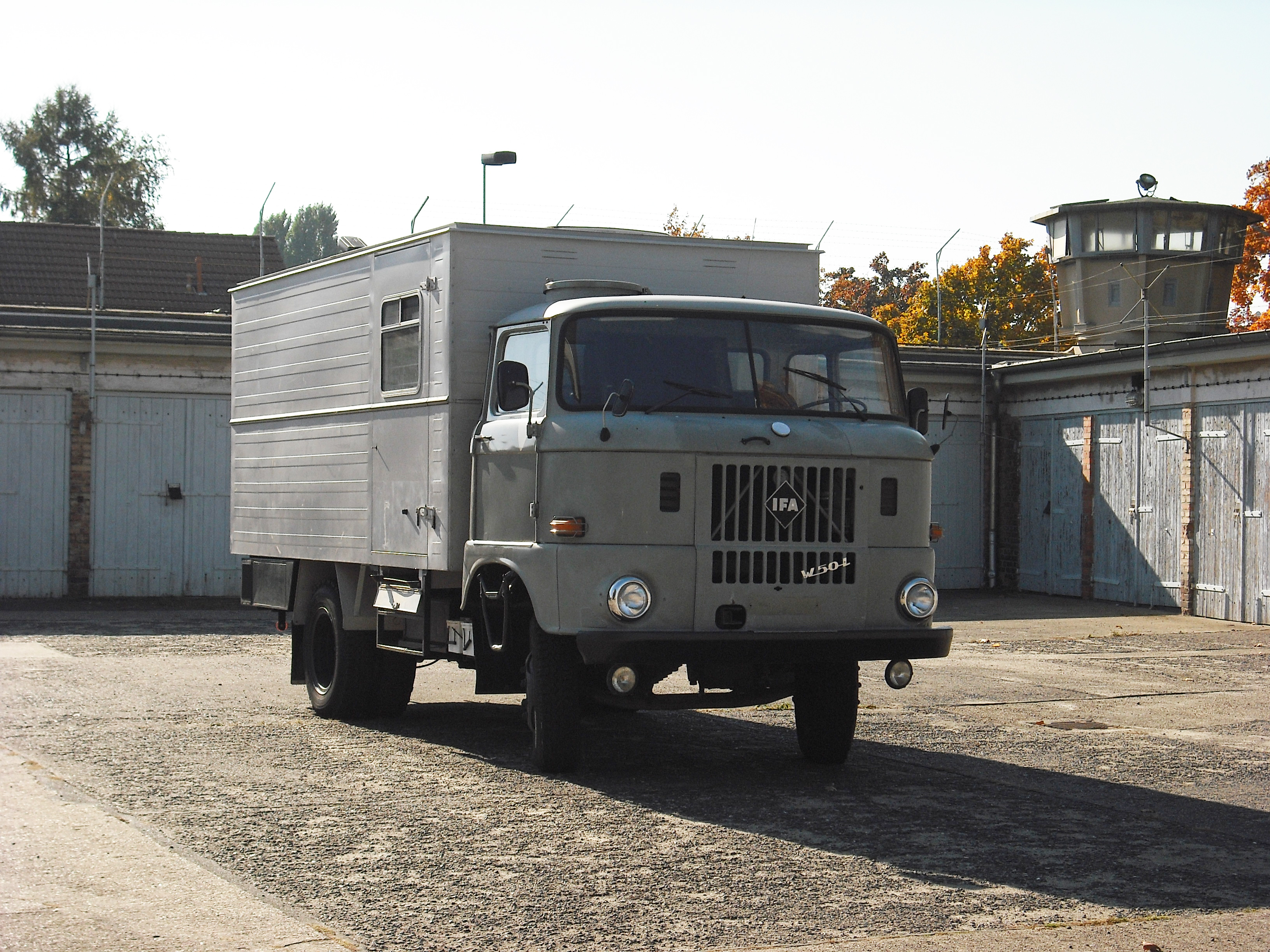
Prison transport

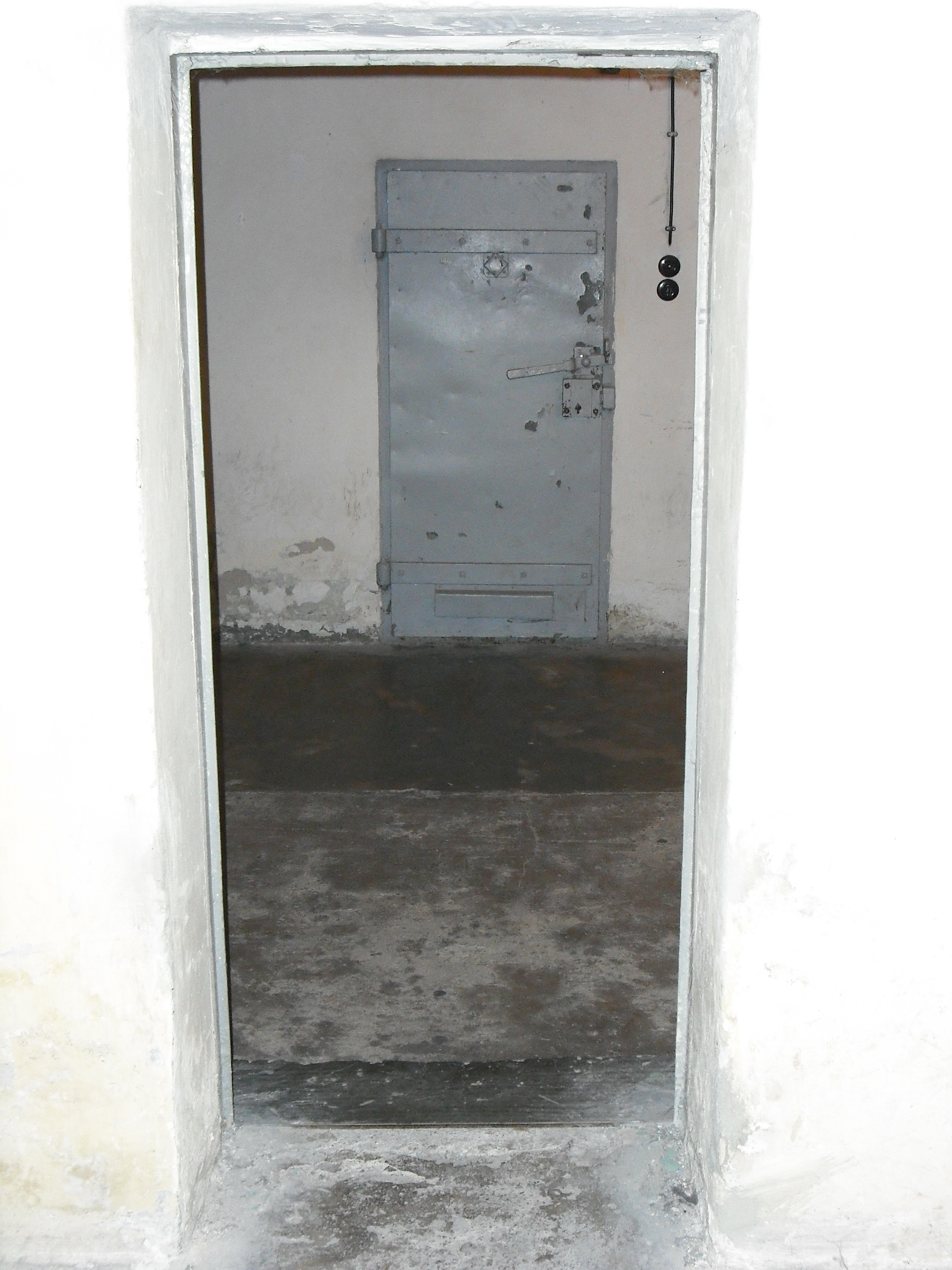
"U-Boot" Cell door

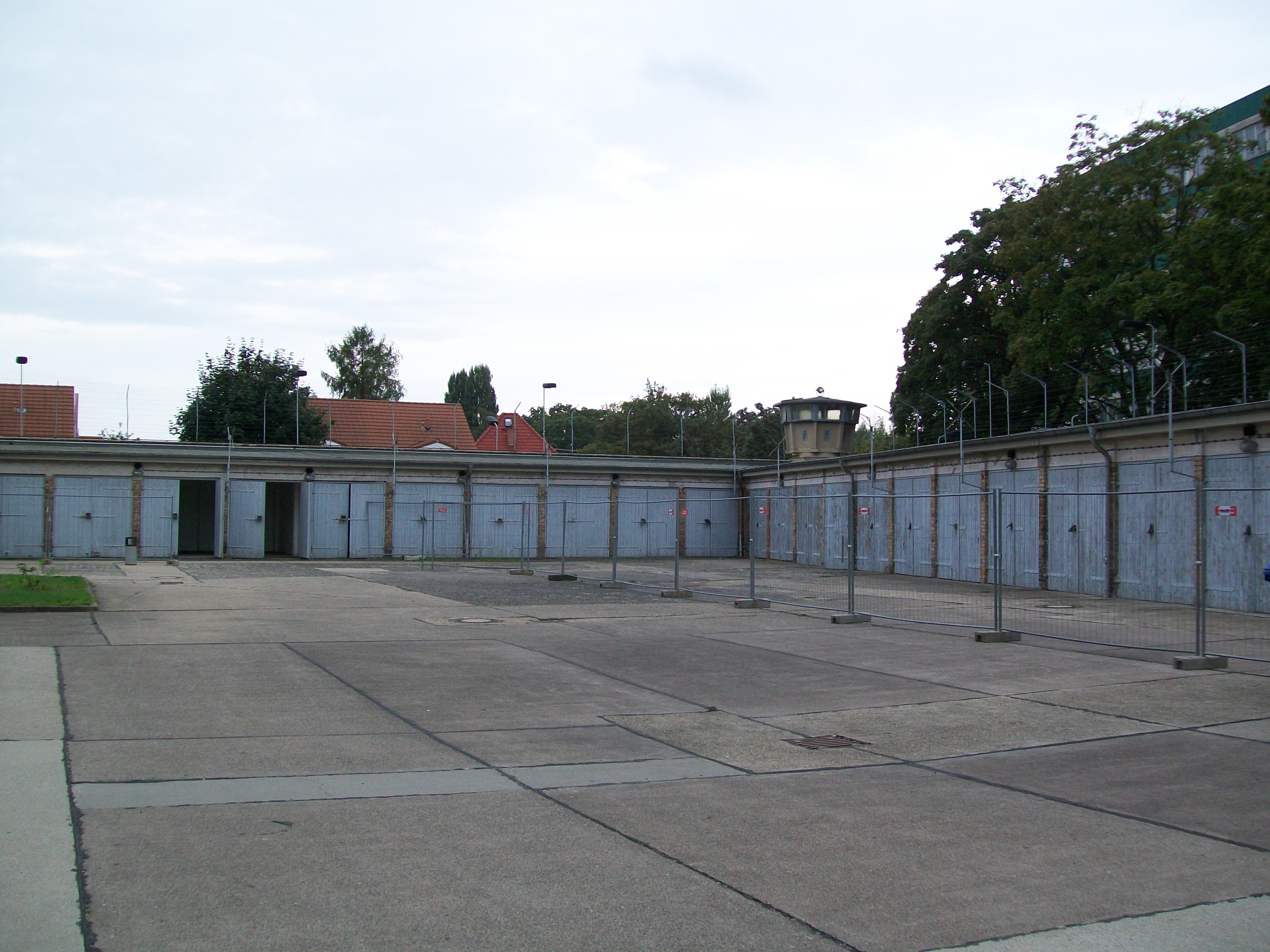

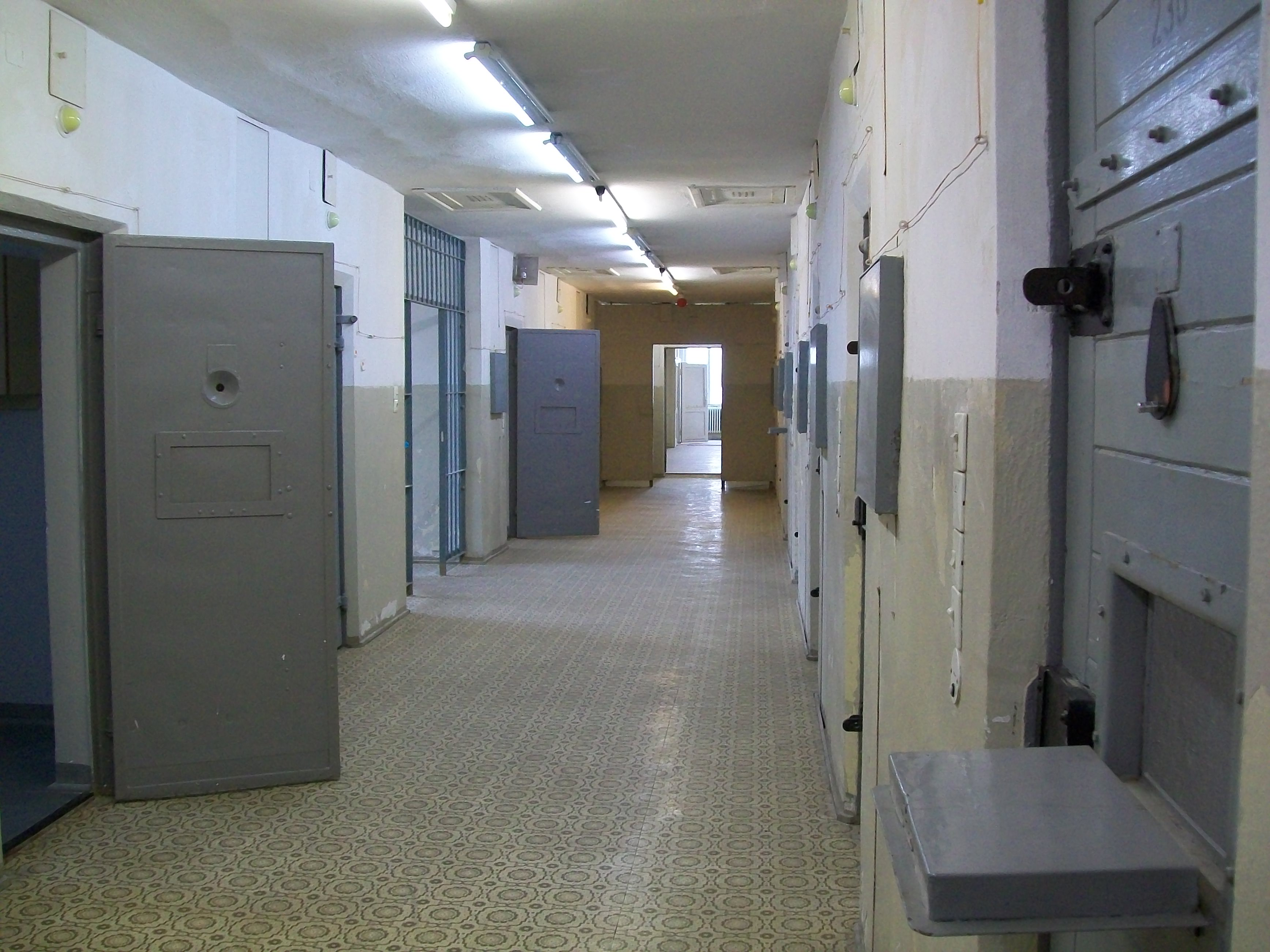

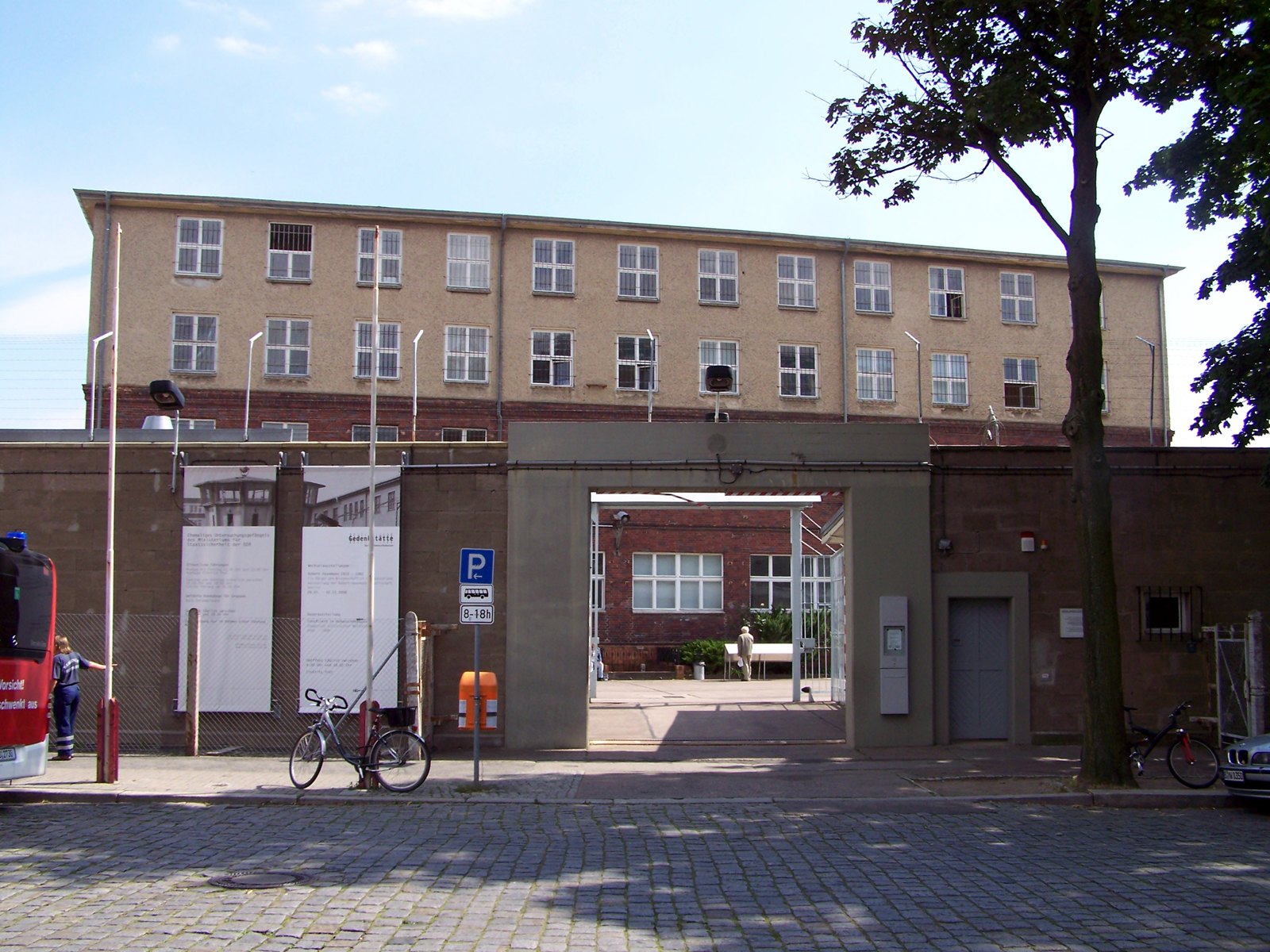
Berlin-Hohenschönhausen Memorial

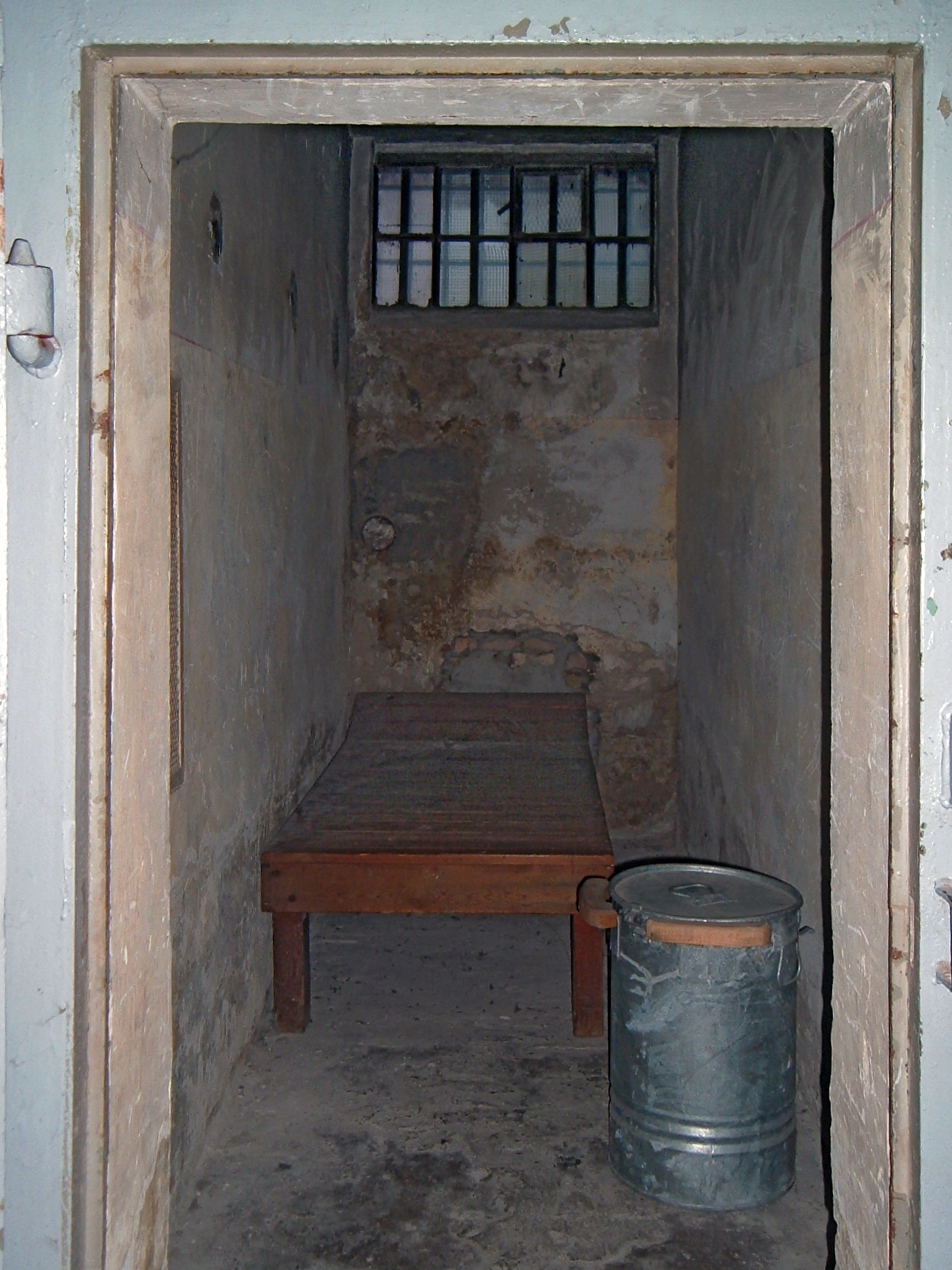
Prison cell

== See also ==
- Memorial and Education Centre Andreasstrasse
