= Christian Carl André =

German natural scientist, publisher, economist and educator

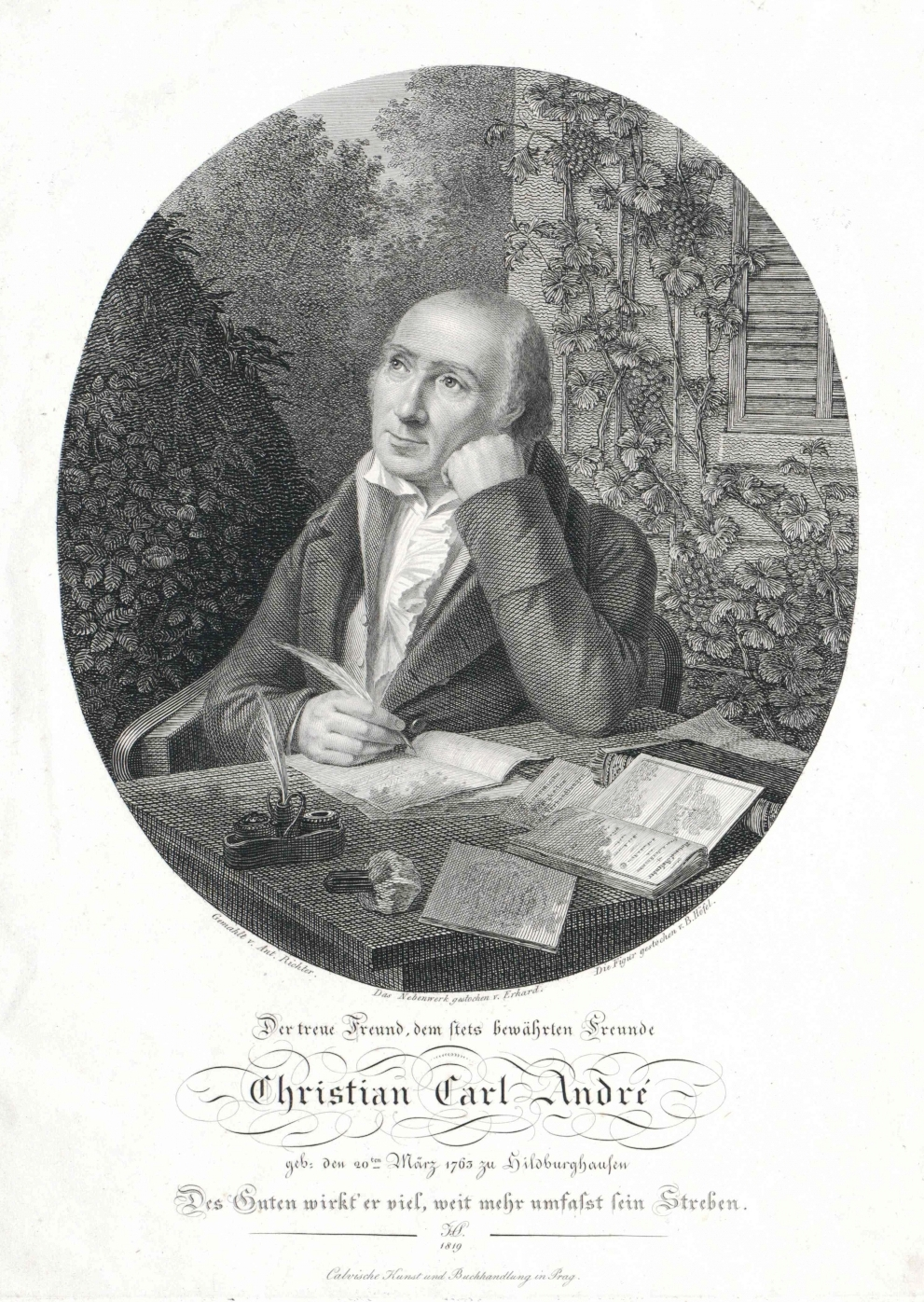
- Engraved portait of Christian Carl André by Blasius Höfel, 1819
- Born: 20 March 1763
- Died: 19 July 1831 (aged 68)
- Occupations: Natural scientist, publisher economist, educator

Christian Carl André (20 March 1763 – 19 July 1831) was a leading 19th century German natural scientist, publisher, economist and educator. He was among the pioneers in the study of heredity whose vision paved the way for the research of Gregor Mendel, the founder of modern genetics.

== Biographical notes ==
Christian Carl André was born on 20 March 1763 in the German town of Hildburghausen. He studied at the University of Jena, and worked as a teacher in Eisenach and at the Schnepfenthal Salzmann School in Gotha. Then from 1798 to 1820 he lived in Brno, then within the Habsburg empire, where he headed the Evangelical Lutheran school; published the newspaper Patriotisches Tagebuch (Patriotic Notebook); and edited a weekly journal Oekonomische Neuigkeiten und Verhandlungen (Economical News and Essays). During this period he was a leading figure in the Moravian Agricultural Society, promoting applied scientific research particularly in the field of sheep-breeding. He then moved to Stuttgart, where he published the Landwirtschaftliche Zeitschrift (Agricultural Journal) and acted as an adviser to the ruler of Württemberg. He died on 19 July 1831.

== Scientific significance ==
In his 1795 textbook on zoology, André showed his understanding of how the characteristics of both parents contribute to those of a new individual, as against the older concept of preformation. In 1815 he drew up a research programme for the Moravian Agricultural Society, stressing the need for basic and applied research in natural science. In many journal articles he disseminated the progress being made, within this Society and in England, on scientific animal and plant breeding. He was instrumental in setting up a sheep-breeding section within the Society - the first animal-breeding association in continental Europe - which investigated methods of artificial selection and the transmission of traits of wool from parents to offspring, i.e. heredity. André addressed in detail the problem of how and in what circumstances inbreeding was liable to lead to weakening of the organism. In 1819 he demonstrated a recently designed micrometer for evaluating wool quality, recognised as marking "the beginning of a new epoch of scientific breeding defined with mathematical precision" His son Rudolf (1792–1827) also studied the theory and practice of sheep-breeding.

The environment of scientific enquiry he helped to foster in the Habsburg empire soon become famous in Europe, and nurtured further work in animal and plant breeding, precursor to the groundbreaking work of Gregor Mendel.
