= Internatsschule Schloss Hansenberg =

Coordinates: 50.0064°N 7.9714°E

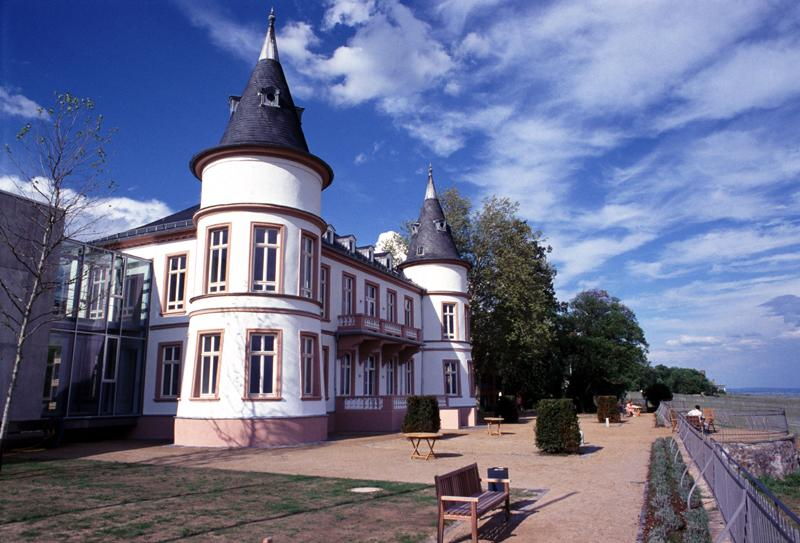

Location
- Hansenbergallee; Geisenheim, Hessen, 65366; Germany

Information
- Type: Secondary school
- Headteacher: Annette Petri
- Gender: Coeducational
- Houses: 9
- Website: www.hansenberg.de

The Internatsschule Schloss Hansenberg (ISH) is a mixed coeducational secondary boarding school in Geisenheim-Johannisberg in the Rheingau in Hesse, Germany.

It was founded in 2003 by the government of Hesse and is run with the help of two companies (Public Private Partnership): Fraport, and the Merck Group.

== Buildings ==
The School building and the pupil's residences have been newly built in 2003, but the historical part of old Schloss Hansenberg is still used for the school's library and some club rooms as well as a Snooker Table. All in all, the school grounds are 30,000 square meters.

== School ==
The aim of the school is to help highly talented and motivated pupils. It is an upper-secondary level school; pupils can only apply in the 9th grade. The number of lessons per week is higher than at other secondary schools and also take place on Saturdays and three times a week in the afternoon. Accommodation costs 415 Euro per month, while school attendance is free. The results of the graduates are, according to the school, better than at most other schools. Currently, there are 184 pupils attending the ISH.

== Boarding School ==
Almost all students live at the boarding school. For pupils who live in the immediate vicinity, there is also the possibility to apply as external pupils. The ratio of girls to boys is almost 1:1.

== Focus ==
The focus of the Internatsschule is on sciences and economics, with compulsory upper-level classes in economics and politics as well as mathematics.

== Application for the ISH ==
Requirements for attendance at the school are very good school grades and social commitment. Due to the high number of applicants, an applicant must participate in a multi-stage selection process, consisting of an application sheet, an intelligence test, and a testing weekend. This process selects the best 64 applicants out of several hundred.

== See also ==
- Landesgymnasium St. Afra, in Saxony
- Landesgymnasium für Hochbegabte Schwäbisch Gmünd, in Baden-Württemberg
- Landesschule Pforta, in Saxony-Anhalt
