= Pforta =

Landesschule Pforta
- Logo of Pforta

Location
- Schulstr. 12; Schulpforte, 06628; Germany; 51°08′33″N 11°45′08″E

Information
- Type: Gymnasium
- Opened: 1543; 483 years ago
- Rector: Kathrin Volkmann
- Staff: 48
- Enrollment: 300
- Classes: 12
- Average class size: 22
- Language: German
- Colors: Purple, white, black
- Yearbook: Keilzeit
- Website: http://www.landesschule-pforta.de

Schulpforta, otherwise known as Pforta, is a school located in Pforta monastery, a former Cistercian monastery (1137–1540). The school is located near Naumburg on the Saale River in the German state of Saxony-Anhalt.

The site has been a school since the 16th century. Notable alumni include mathematician August Ferdinand Möbius, historian Leopold von Ranke, and philosopher Friedrich Nietzsche. Today, it is a notable public boarding school for academically gifted children, otherwise called Landesschule Pforta. It is coeducational and teaches around 300 high school students.

Pforta was proposed for inscription in the World Heritage List as one component of the German nomination Naumburg Cathedral and the High Medieval Cultural Landscape of the Rivers Saale and Unstrut.

== History ==
=== Monastery ===
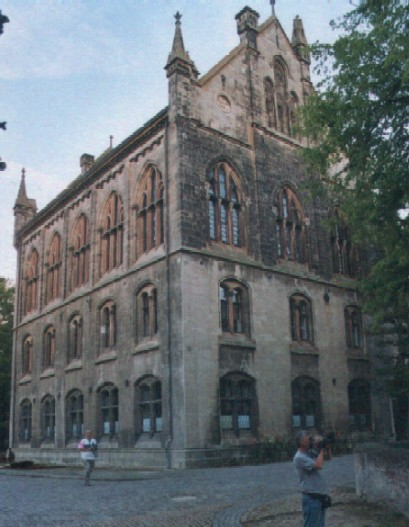
Pforta, Altes Schulhaus

The abbey was at first situated in Schmölln on the Sprotta, near Altenburg. In 1127, Count Bruno of Pleissengau founded a Benedictine monastery there and endowed it with 1,100 hides of land. This foundation, not being successful, on 23 April 1132, Bishop Udo I of Naumburg, a relative of Bruno's, replaced the Benedictines by Cistercian monks from Walkenried Abbey. The situation here proved undesirable, and in 1137 Udo transferred the monastery to Pforta, and conferred upon it fifty hides of arable land, an important tract of forest, and two farms belonging to the diocese.

The patroness of the abbey was the Blessed Virgin Mary. The first abbot was Adalbert, from 1132 to 1152. Under the third abbot, Adetold, two daughter houses were founded under Pforta's auspices, in the Mark of Meissen and in Silesia, and in 1163, the monasteries of Altzella and Leubus were also established in the latter province. At this period the monks numbered about eighty. In 1205, Pforta sent a colony of monks to Livonia, founding there the monastery of Dünamünde. The abbey was distinguished for its excellent system of management, and after the first 140 years of its existence its possessions had increased tenfold.

At the end of the 13th and the beginning of the 14th centuries, after a period of strife, the monastery flourished again. The last quarter of the 14th century witnessed, however, the gradual decline of its prosperity, and also the relaxation of monastic discipline. When Abbot Johannes IV was elected in 1515, there were forty-two monks and seven lay brothers who later revolted against the abbot; an inspection by Duke George of Saxony reported that morality had ceased to exist in the monastery.

The last abbot, Peter Schederich, was elected in 1533. When the Catholic Duke George was succeeded by his Protestant brother Henry, the monastery was suppressed on 9 November 1540, with the abbot, eleven monks, and four lay brothers being pensioned off.

=== Boarding school ===
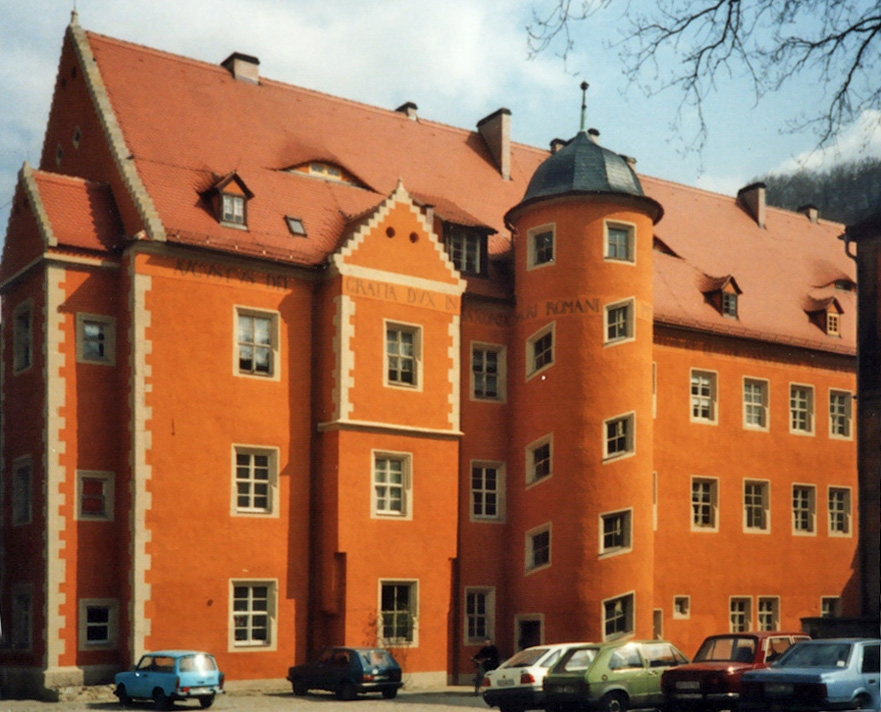
Fürstenhaus

In 1543, Henry's son Duke Moritz opened a national school in the abbey, appropriating for its use the revenues of the suppressed monastery of Memleben Abbey. At first the number of scholars was 100; in 1563, fifty more could be accommodated. The first rector was Johann Gigas, renowned as a lyric poet. Under Justinus Bertuch (1601–1626) the school attained the zenith of its prosperity. It suffered greatly during the Thirty Years' War, in 1643, there being only eleven scholars. After the Napoleonic Wars (1815), Pforta became a part of Prussia, and then the Imperial Germany.

From 1935 until 1945 Schulpforta served as a Nationalpolitische Erziehungsanstalt (NPEA). The NPEAs (37 in all) promoted National Socialist (Nazi) ideals, encouraging boys between the ages of 11 and 18 to pursue occupations (including the SS) which supported the National Socialist cause.

In 1949, the institute became co-educational. Today the school is maintained by the German state of Saxony-Anhalt, but still supported by its own Schulpforta Foundation.

== Architecture ==
The remains of the monastery include the 13th century gothic church; it is a cross-vaulted, colonnaded basilica with an extraordinarily long nave, a peculiar western façade, and a late Romanesque double-naved cloister. What remains of the original building (1137–40) is in the Romanesque style, while the restoration (1251–1268) belongs to the early Gothic. Other buildings are now used as dormitories and lecture halls. There is also the Fürstenhaus ("prince's house"), built in 1573. Schulpforta was one of the three Fürstenschulen ("prince's schools") founded in 1543 by Maurice, Elector of Saxony (at that time Duke), the two others being at Grima and at Meissen.

== Notable pupils ==
Notable pupils include:

- Theobald von Bethmann Hollweg, German chancellor
- August Buchner (1591–1661), Baroque poet
- Johann Gottlieb Fichte, philosopher
- Friedrich Gottlieb Klopstock, poet
- Frederic Henry Hedge, American Transcendentalist
- Günther Lützow, World War II fighter pilot
- August Ferdinand Möbius, mathematician
- Carl Wilhelm Müller (1728–1801), German politician
- Friedrich Nietzsche, philosopher
- Leopold von Ranke, historian
- Johann Christian Wernsdorf, writer
- Ulrich von Wilamowitz-Moellendorff, classical philologist
- Christian Gottfried Ehrenberg, German naturalist
- Johann Hermann Schein, German composer and Thomaskantor
- Frederick Klaeber (1863–1954), German philologist

== See also ==
- Landesgymnasium St. Afra, in Saxony
- Gymnasium St. Augustine in Grimma, Saxony
- Internatsschule Schloss Hansenberg, in Hesse
- Landesgymnasium für Hochbegabte Schwäbisch Gmünd, in Baden-Württemberg
- Schnepfenthal Salzmann School, in Thuringia
