= Sächsisches Landesgymnasium Sankt Afra zu Meißen =

Boarding school in Meissen, Saxony

Coordinates: 51°09′50″N 13°28′05″E

- Motto: Sapere Aude
- Established: 1543; 483 years ago 2001 (modern)
- Rector: Stefan Weih
- Administrative staff: 65 (Current state: 09/10)
- Students: 284 (Current state: 09/10)
- Location: Meissen, Germany
- Website: http://www.sankt-afra.de

Sächsisches Landesgymnasium Sankt Afra zu Meißen is a boarding school for highly gifted students in the German city of Meissen, Saxony. Founded in 1543 as Fürstliche Landesschule and re-established in 2001, the stated aim of the school is to promote the intellectual and social development of highly gifted students. The costs for attending the school comply with the maxim of social balance; the boarding and schooling fees are considerably low in contrast to similar institutions. It is the first publicly funded school for highly gifted students in Germany and is a model for similar schools.

The school has no official English name. Its German name translates to "Saxon State Gymnasium Saint Afra in Meissen", and is derived from the former Augustinian monastery of the Canons Regular that had been built around the local Saint Afra church.

== Notable students and professors ==
=== Students ===
- Petrus Albinus
- Karl Salomo Zachariae von Lingenthal
- Christian Fürchtegott Gellert
- Gottlieb Wilhelm Rabener
- Gotthold Ephraim Lessing
- Samuel Hahnemann
- Friedrich Naumann
- Ernst Schnabel
- Wilhelm Knabe
- Silvana Konermann
- John Windrich

=== Professors ===
- Georg Fabricius - Rector (1546-1571)

== See also ==
- Landesgymnasium für Hochbegabte Schwäbisch Gmünd in Baden-Württemberg
- Internatsschule Schloss Hansenberg in Hesse
- Landesschule Pforta in Saxony-Anhalt
- Gymnasium St. Augustine in Grimma, Saxony
- Schnepfenthal Salzmann School in Thuringia
- Sir-Karl-Popper-Schule in Vienna, Austria
