= Karl Eduard Zachariae von Lingenthal =

German jurist (1812–1894)

Karl Eduard Zachariae von Lingenthal (December 24, 1812 – June 3, 1894) was a German jurist and the son of Karl Salomo Zachariae von Lingenthal.

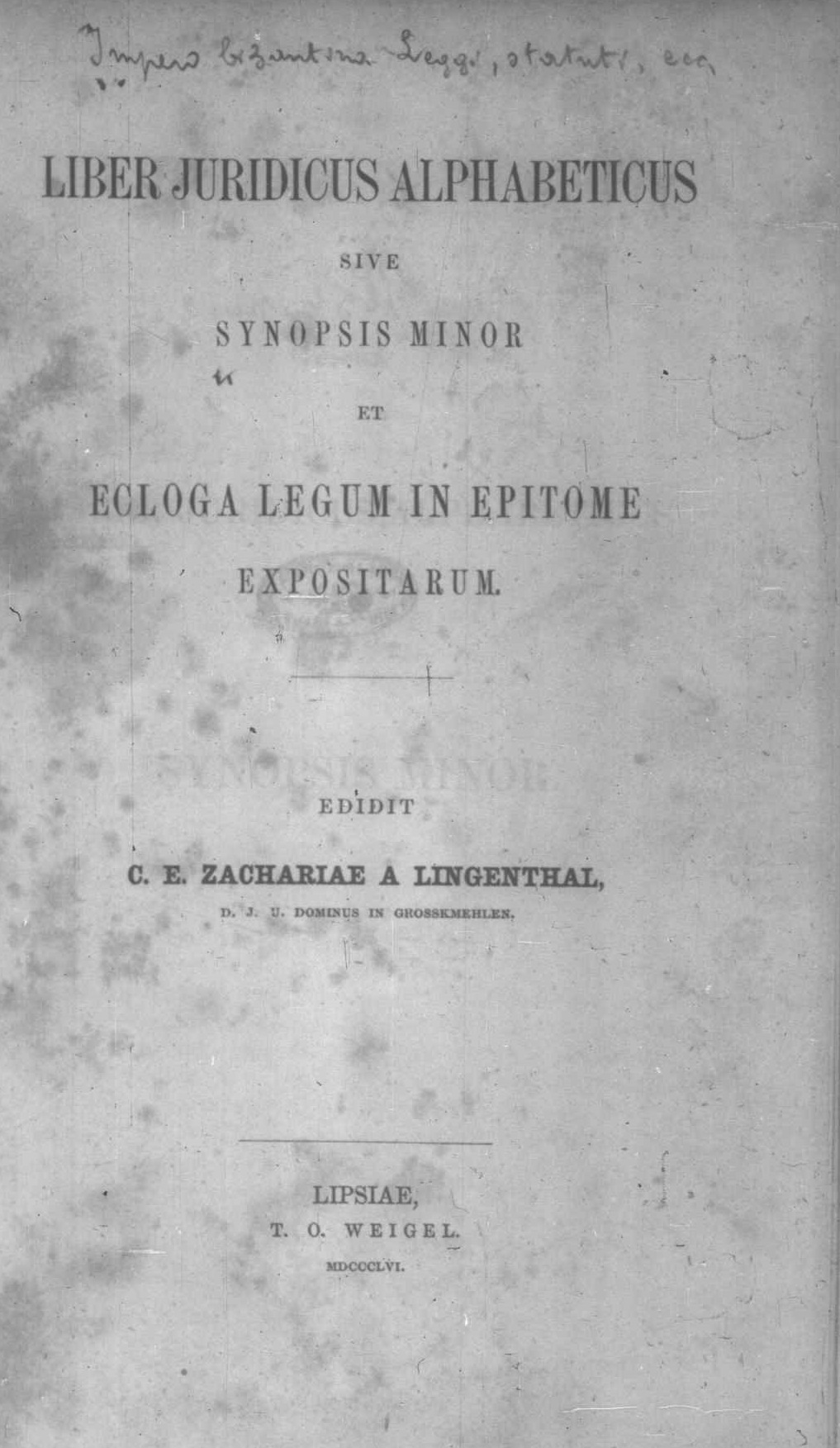
Ius graeco-romanum, 1856

== Life ==
He studied philosophy, history, mathematics and linguistics, as well as jurisprudence, at Leipzig, Berlin and Heidelberg.

Having made Roman and Byzantine law his special study, he visited Paris in 1832 to examine Byzantine manuscripts, then went in 1834 to Saint Petersburg and Copenhagen for the same purpose, and in 1835 worked in the libraries of Brussels, London, Oxford, Dublin, Edinburgh and Cambridge.

After a few months as a practising lawyer and privatdozent at Heidelberg, he went in 1837, in search of materials, to Italy and the East, visiting Athens, Constantinople and the monasteries of Mount Athos.

Having a taste for a country life, and none for teaching, he gave up his position as extraordinary professor at Heidelberg, and in 1845 bought an estate in the Prussian province of Saxony. Here he lived, engaged in scientific agriculture and interested in Prussian politics, until his death.

== Works ==
- Ius graeco-romanum (in Latin). Vol. 2. Leipzig: Weigel. 1856.
- Ius graeco-romanum (in Latin). Vol. 7. Leipzig: Hirschfeld. 1884.
