= Karl Salomo Zachariae von Lingenthal =

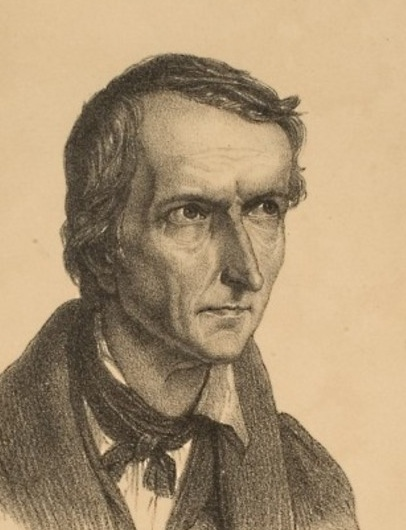
Karl Salomo Zachariae von Lingenthal

Karl Salomo Zachariae von Lingenthal (14 September 1769 – 27 March 1843), a German jurist, was born at Meissen in Saxony, the son of a lawyer, and was the father of Karl Eduard Zachariae.

Von Lingenthal received his early education at the famous public school of St. Afra in Meissen and later studied philosophy, history, mathematics and jurisprudence at the University of Leipzig. In 1792 he went to Wittenberg University as tutor to one of the counts of Lippe, and continued his legal studies.

In 1794 he became Privatdozent, lecturing on Canon law, in 1798 extraordinary professor, and 1802 ordinary professor of feudal law.

From that time to his death in 1843, with the exception of a short period in which public affairs occupied him, he poured out a succession of works covering the whole field of jurisprudence, and was a copious contributor to periodicals. In 1807 he received a call to Heidelberg, then beginning its period of splendour as a school of law. There, resisting many calls to Göttingen, Berlin and other universities, he remained until his death. In 1820 he took his seat, as representative of his university, in the upper house of the newly constituted parliament of Baden.

Though he himself prepared many reforms - notably in the harsh criminal code - he was, by instinct and conviction, conservative and totally opposed to the violent democratic spirit which dominated the second chamber, and brought it into conflict with the grand-duke and the German federal government.

After the remodelling of the constitution in a "reactionary" sense, he was returned, in 1825, by the district of Heidelberg to the second chamber, of which he became the first vice-president, and in which he proved himself more "loyal" than the government itself. With the growth of parliamentary Liberalism, however, he grew disgusted with politics, from which he retired altogether in 1829. He then devoted himself wholly to juridical work and to the last days of his life toiled with the ardour of a young student.

== Works and studies ==
The German universities then enjoyed, in regard to legal questions of international importance, a moral jurisdiction dating from the Middle Ages, and Zachariae was often consulted as to questions arising in Germany, France and England.

Elaborate "opinions," some of them forming veritable treatises - e.g. on Sir Augustus d'Este's claim to the dukedom of Sussex, Baron de Bode's claim as an English subject to a share in the French indemnity, the dispute as to the debts due to the elector of Hesse-Kassel (or Hesse-Cassel), confiscated by Napoleon, and the constitutional position of the Mecklenburg landowners - were composed by Zachariae.

Large fees which he received for these opinions and the great popularity of his lectures made him rich, and he was able to buy several estates; from one of which, Lingenthal, he took his title when, in 1842, he was ennobled by the grand-duke. He died on 27 March 1843. He had married in 1811, but his wife died four years later, leaving him a son, Karl Eduard.

Zachariae's writings are many and multifarious. They deal with almost every branch of jurisprudence; they are philosophical, historical and practical, and relate to Roman, Canon, German, French and English law. The first book of much consequence which he published was Die Einheit des Staats und der Kirche mit Rücksicht auf die Deutsche Reichsverfassung (1797), a work on the relations of church and state, with special reference to the constitution of the empire, which displayed the writer's power of analysis and his skill in making a complicated set of facts appear to be deductions from a few principles.

In 1805 appeared Versuch einer allgemeinen Hermeneutik des Rechts; and in 1806 Die Wissenschaft der Gesetzgebung, an attempt to find a new theoretical basis for society in place of the opportunist politics which had led to the cataclysm of the French Revolution. This basis he seemed to discover in something resembling Jeremy Bentham's utilitarianism.

Zachariae's last work of importance was Vierzig Bücher vom Staate (1839–1842), to which his admirers point as his enduring monument. It has been compared to Montesquieu's L'Esprit des lois, The Spirit of the Laws and covers no small part of the field of Buckle's first volume of the History of Civilization. But though it contains proof of vast erudition and many original ideas as to the future of the state and of law, it lacks logical sequence, and is, consequently, full of contradictions.

Its fundamental theory is that the state had its origin, not in a contract (Rousseau-Kant), but in the consciousness of a legal duty. What Machiavelli was to the Italians and Montesquieu to the French, Zachariae aspired to become to the Germans; but he lacked their patriotic inspiration, and so failed to exercise any permanent influence on the constitutional law of his country.

Among other important works of Zachariae are his Staatsrecht, and his treatise on the Code Napoléon, Handbuch des Französischen Civilrechts (1st print Heidelberg; 1808), of which several French editions were published, and which was translated into Italian. He strongly referred in his work to the importance of Roman Codification.

Zachariae edited with Karl Joseph Mittermaier the Kritische Zeitschrift für Rechtswissenschaft und Gesetzgebung des Auslandes, and the introduction which he wrote illustrates his wide reading and his constant desire for new light upon old problems. Though Zachariae's works have been superseded, they were in their day epoch-making, and they have been superseded by books which, without them, could not have been written.

For an account of Zachariae and his works, see Robert von Mohl, Geschichte u. Literatur der Staatswissenschaften (1855–58), and Charles Brocher, K. S. Zachariae, sa vie et ses oeuvres (1870); cf. also his biography in Allgem. Deutsche Biographie (vol. 44) by Wilhelm Fischer, and "Zachariae von Lingenthal" in Franz von Holtzendorff's Rechts-Lexicon.
