= Landesgymnasium für Hochbegabte Schwäbisch Gmünd =

- State Grammar School for Highly Gifted Children
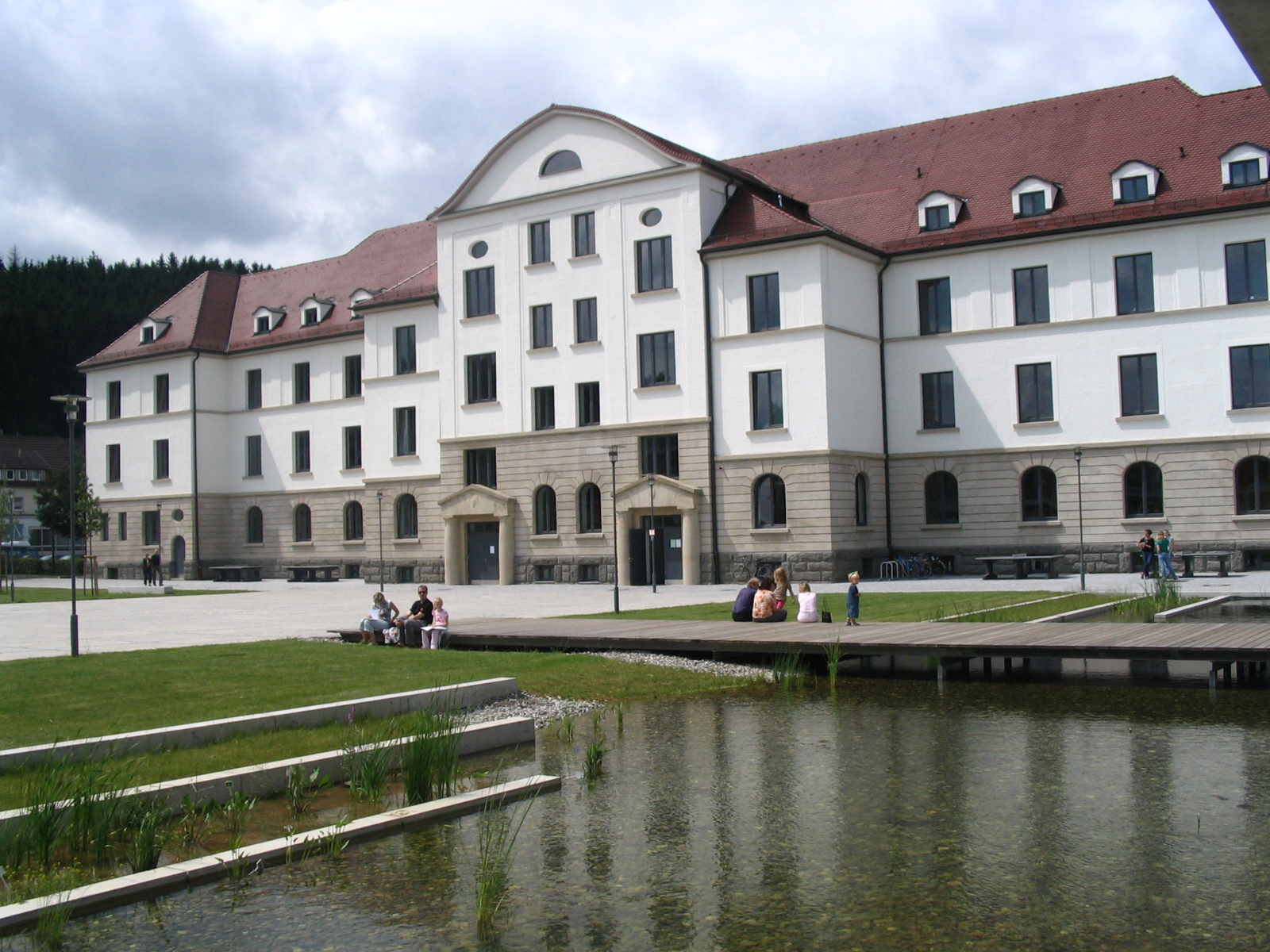

Location
- Universitätspark 21; 73525 Schwäbisch Gmünd; Germany; 48.8007°N 9.8145°E

Information
- School type: Public boarding school for highly gifted students
- Established: 2004
- Headmaster: Lutz Häcker
- Teaching staff: 39 (2011–12)
- Years offered: 7–12
- Gender: co-educational
- Enrollment: 250 (2011–12)
- Average class size: 24
- Student to teacher ratio: 6:1
- Abitur average: 1.7
- Newspaper: derfarbfleck
- Website: www.lgh-gmuend.de

The Landesgymnasium für Hochbegabte (German for State Grammar School for Highly Gifted Children) in Schwäbisch Gmünd is a co-educational public Boarding school for highly gifted students founded by the state of Baden-Württemberg. It is the first and sole school of this kind in this state. The Landesgymnasium für Hochbegabte is a publicly funded school in Germany for highly gifted students, similar to the Landesschule Pforta in Saxony-Anhalt, the Landesgymnasium St. Afra in Saxony and Internatsschule Schloss Hansenberg in Hesse. It is funded by the city of Schwäbisch Gmünd, the district Ostalbkreis and the state of Baden-Württemberg. Its stated aim is the promotion of the intellectual and social development of its students.

== Location ==
The Landesgymnasium's campus is situated at the University park in the east of Schwäbisch Gmünd. During the 20th century it was used as barracks initially by the German Army (Bismarck Kaserne) and then after WWII as a US military base with nuclear Pershing II missiles stationed nearby, which were eliminated in 1990. In 1992, the US forces withdrew and the campus was used as a spin-out of the University of Maryland University College until 2002. School building, boarding houses and teachers' flats are situated in the recently renovated barracks while the canteen and a gym were newly built on the former parade ground.

== Conception ==
The boarding school started in the school year 2004/05 with one class, which never comprises more than 24 students, in both years 7 and 10. It expanded during the following years so that from the school year 2012/13 there are two classes per year. Thus the school has about 250 students of which around 200 are boarders.

=== General Principle ===
The Landesgymnasium für Hochbegabte is dedicated to facilitate the positive development of its highly gifted students' talents and aptitudes. It is guided by the motto of William Stern, the psychologist who coined the term intelligence quotient:

'Intelligenz an sich ist ein Rüstzeug: Wertvoll wird sie erst durch die positiven Ziele, in deren Dienst sie verwandt wird.'

'Intelligence by itself is an armamentarium: It becomes valuable only through the positive aims which it is used for.'

With this maxim, the Landesgymnasiums' students shall pledge themselves to their talents and the associated demand to contribute to the formation of a responsibility elite (germ. 'Verantwortungselite'). Not only the intellectual capacity is to be supported; the school puts also high emphasis on the holistic personal development of its students. For this reason, besides the accelerated and enriched classes, the 'Fundamentum:, the school offers a wide variety of extra-curricular activities, the so-called Addita.

By means of the role the student council are given, in the form of 'student parliament', 'constitution council' and the president of the student council, the students shall have the opportunity to witness and to co-create democratic processes, early.

=== The Campus Model ===
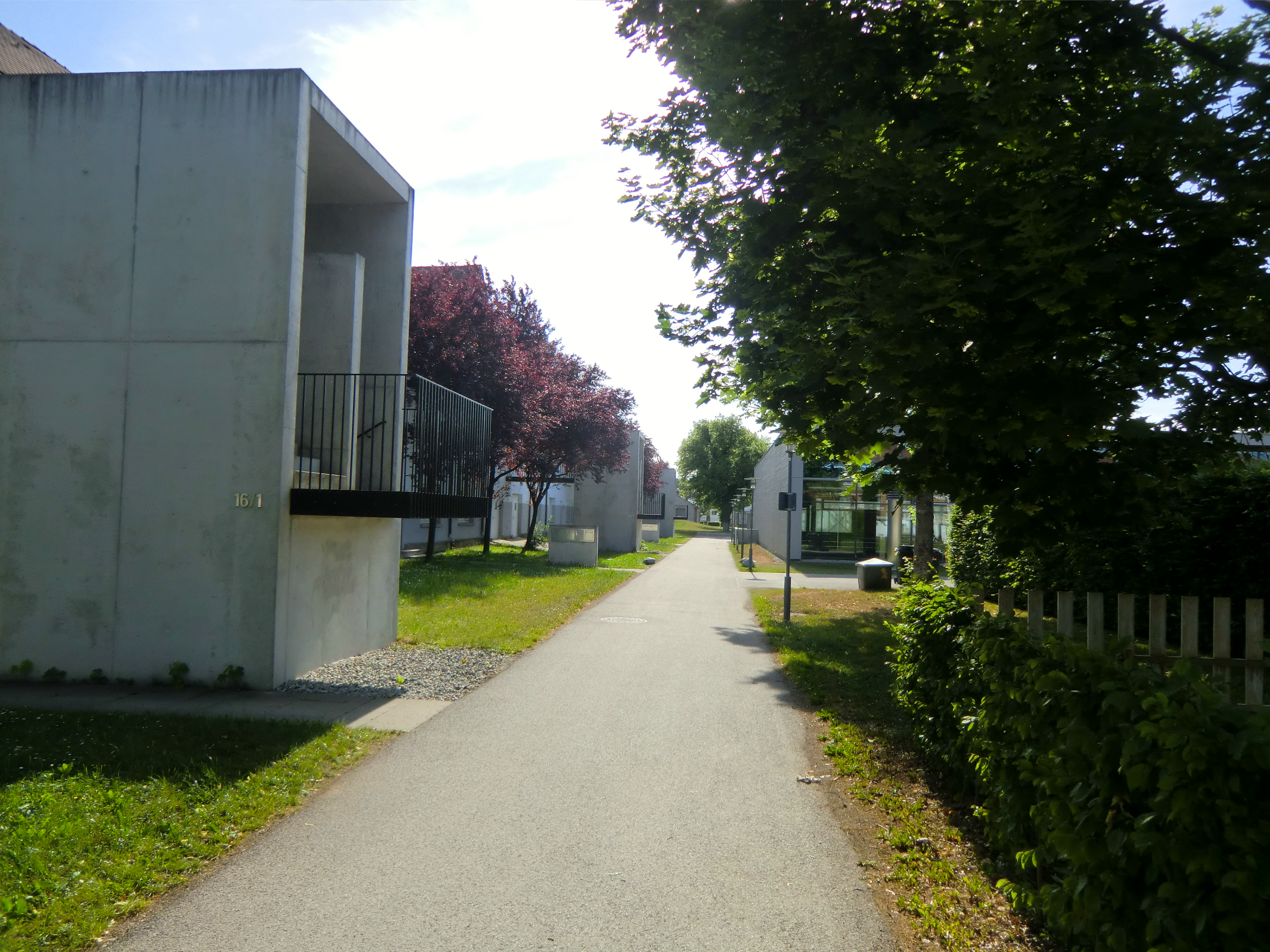
Teachers' Flats on Campus

School and College constitute one pedagogical union. Until the end of the school year 2007/08, attending the college (living in the boarding houses not at home) was obligatory. Then, however, this compulsion was nullified by the council of ministers. Since school year 2008/09, every class of 24 students consists of a maximum of four external students, who live nearby and participate nevertheless in the campus life.

The students life in the boarding houses, which are divided into middle (years 7–10) and upper school (year 11–12) and boys and girls in living groups. Every group is looked after by a teacher as a mentor. The Landesgymnasium's teacher thus have a pedagogical double function: On the one hand they teach their subjects, on the other they advise, accompany and guide the students as mentors in the school and college, which is why the teachers mostly live directly on campus.

With increasing age, self-organisation attains more and more importance for the students. The more responsible-minded they are, the greater are the areas of freedom that are conceded by the school and college. Thereby, the Landesgymnasium offers important opportunities to live democratic forms of cohabitation and the acceptance of responsibility.

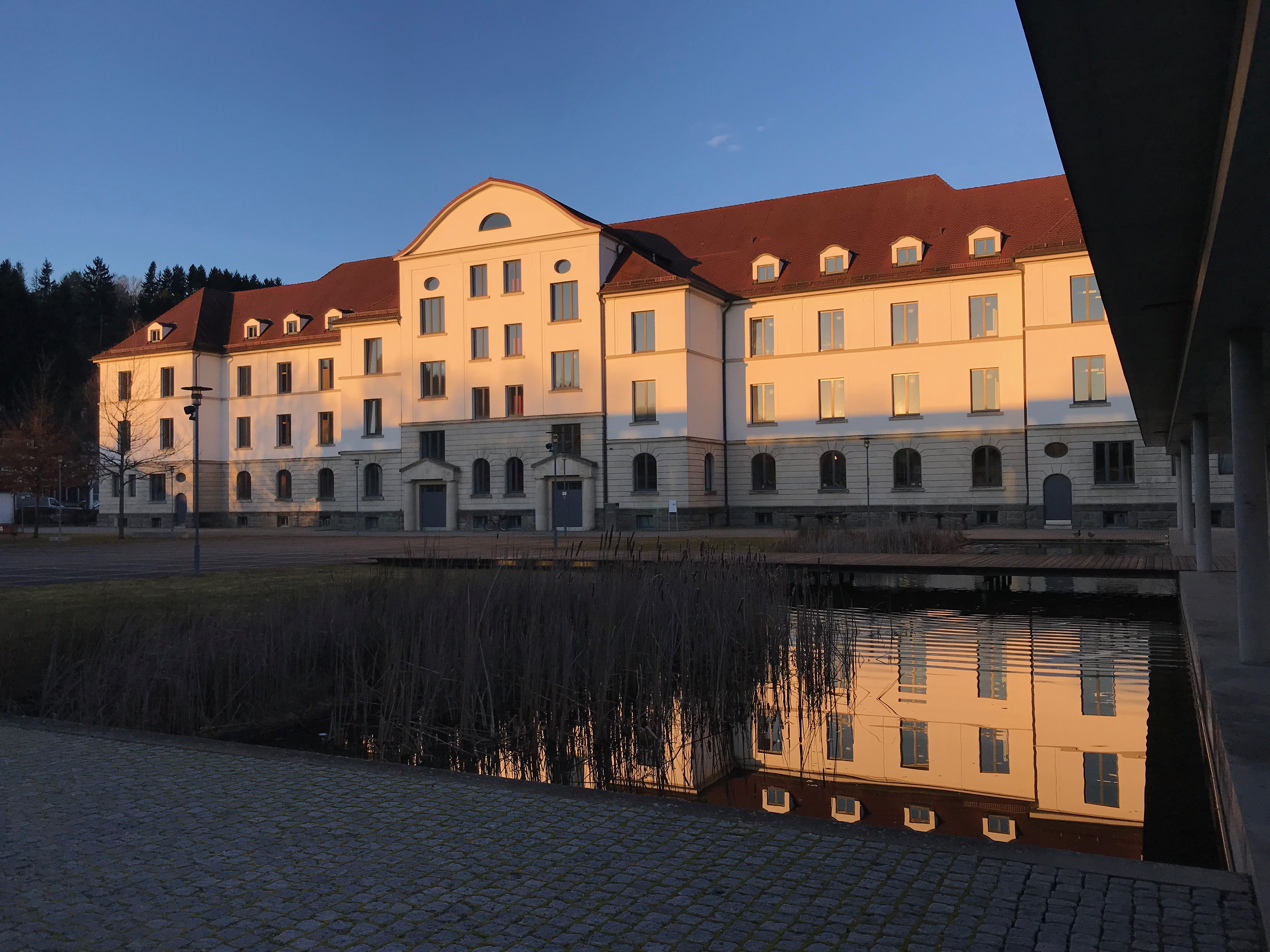
The early morning sun hitting the school building of the Landesgymnasium für Hochbegabte, Schwäbisch Gmünd.

=== Admissions ===
The admission is highly competitive and comprises three stages that must be completed successfully. Firstly, a statement by each the student and his parents has to explain motivation and background of the application. Secondly, the tested IQ must be about 130 or above. Lastly, those applicants who master the first steps are invited to spend two days living in the boarding houses and to work together in groups on different projects that assess both intellectual potential and social competence. The headteachers and the psychologists then choose a harmonic class on the basis of the gathered information. Applicants who are successful are admitted for half a year on probation. Every year a class in year 7 and another year is admitted plus some lateral entrants who fill empty places.

=== Teaching ===
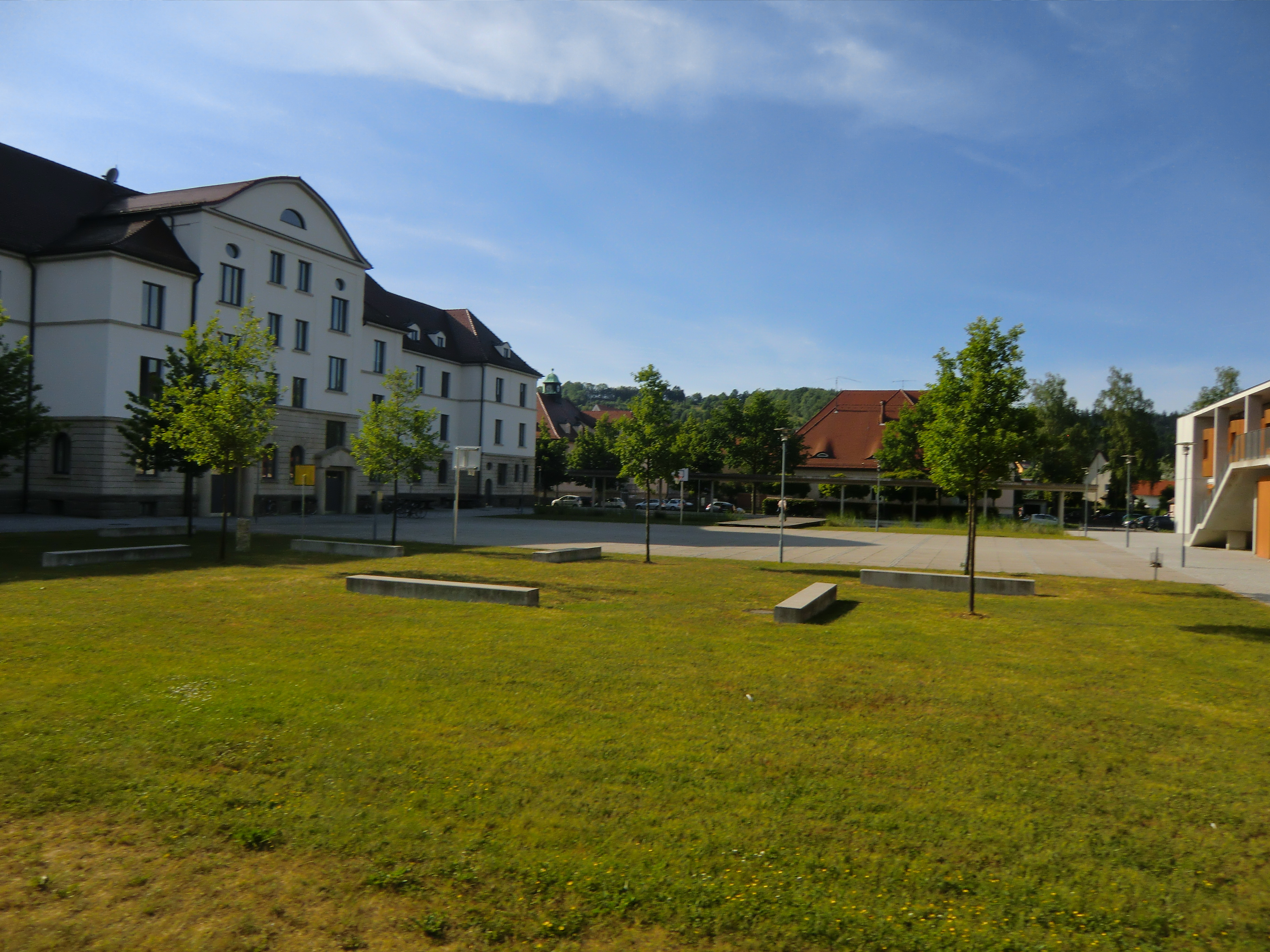
The school building

For years 7 to 10, the school year is divided into trimesters, the upper school years are by law divided into semesters.

Concerning teaching there are some major differences to ordinary German Gymnasiums. In foreign languages and mathematics from year 7 to 10, lessons are divided into different sets that can be attended by the students according to ability not to age. Thus it is possible for a year 8 student to study mathematics on the level of year 10, English on the level of year 9 and French on the level of year 8.

If a student is so excellent in a subject that even the highest set is not demanding, he can decide, together with his teacher, his mentor and his parents, that to conclude a 'learning treaty': The student is dispensed from classes in this subject but pledges to acquire the curriculum autodidactically in addition to further studies in the field. A student can even partially study at university.

Regularly, students participate successfully at national and international competitions such as World Schools Debating Championships, International Physics Olympiad, International Junior Science Olympiad, Jugend forscht, Jugend musiziert, TSA.

==== Addita ====
Addita are extra-curricular activities that represent an integral part of the Landesgymnasium's conception. In this part of the school life students have both the opportunity to get new inspirations as well as intensifying their knowledge in areas of special interest.

The Addita are divided into five different categories from which students are obliged to choose at least two athletic, one creative and two intellectual ones.

- Scientifical Addita, e.g. ChemTech (Chemistry), NUGI+ (Biology), iLab (Computer Science), Mathematics for specialists, Technology Student Association (Engineering)
- Musical-artistic Addita, e.g. Drama, Arts, Choir, Big Band, Musical
- Linguistic Addita, e.g. French, Chinese, Russian, Arabic, Italian
- Humanistic Addita, e.g. Philosophy, Checkers, Theories of State, History, Model United Nations
- Athletic Addita: e.g. Soccer, Ballroom dancing, Ultimate Frisbee, American Football.

Addita can be conducted by teachers as well as students who have a high proficiency in a field.

=== Fees ===
The Landesgymnasium für Hochbegabte is a public Gymnasium, thus attendance of school is free of charge. However, there are costs for board and lodging, which amount to around 500 € per month. Support for families in financial hardship is ensured by the state (BAföG), so that no one is excluded for financial reasons.

== Center of Competence for the Promotion of the Highly Gifted ==
The Center of Competence is a division of the Landesgymnasium consisting of several psychologists and fulfills internal and external tasks. It is both involved in admitting and counselling students as well as providing further education for the teachers and Surveys in the school. Furthermore, it is a statewide contact point for questions concerning the promotion of highly gifted.

Besides, the Center of Competence is a test center for a variety of university admissions tests such as ACT, TSA Test and many more.

== Student Research Center ==
In 2007, the Student Research Center was inaugurated. It enables students from the Landesgymnasium as well as from the other Gymnasiums of Schwäbisch Gmünd to conduct first research work, for example in a laboratorium accredited for Genetic Engineering.

== Alumni ==
In July 2009, the Alumni Association of the Landesgymnasium für Hochbegabte was founded. Its aim is exchange of experience, practical and ideational support of the school and maintaining contact.

== See also ==
- Landesgymnasium St. Afra, in Saxony
- Internatsschule Schloss Hansenberg, in Hesse
- Landesschule Pforta, in Saxony-Anhalt
- Schnepfenthal Salzmann School, in Thuringia
