= KFG =

KFG may refer to:

- Kardinal-Frings-Gymnasium, a school in Bonn, Germany
- Kaiserin-Friedrich-Gymnasium, a school in Bad Homburg vor der Höhe, Germany
- Kalkurung Airport, an airport in Australia by IATA airport code
- Knattspyrnufélag Garðabæjar, an Icelandic association football club
