= Humboldtschule, Bad Homburg =

Humboldtschule

Location
- Jacobistraße 37; 61348 Bad Homburg v. d. Höhe; Hochtaunuskreis; Hesse; Germany
- Coordinates: 50.222°N 8.610°E

Information
- School type: Public Gymnasium
- Founded: 1900
- School number: 5194
- Head of school: Carine Kleine-Jänsch
- Grades: 5–13
- Gender: Coeducational
- Newspaper: kaHUS
- Website: humboldt.schule

The Humboldtschule (abbreviation: HUS; English: Humboldt School) is one of two Gymnasiums, besides the Kaiserin-Friedrich-Gymnasium (KFG), in Bad Homburg vor der Höhe, Hesse, Germany.

The eponyms are Alexander (1769–1859) and Wilhelm von Humboldt (1767–1835). Since November 2000 the school is a recognized UNESCO project school (UNESCO-Projektschule). In the school year 2008/2009, the school had 134 teachers and 1,602 students. Starting with school year 2009/2010 the school has 1,750 students. The history of the school goes back to 1900. Founded as Städtische Höhere Mädchenschule in 1900, the school has grown to be one of the largest schools in the Hochtaunuskreis.

== History ==
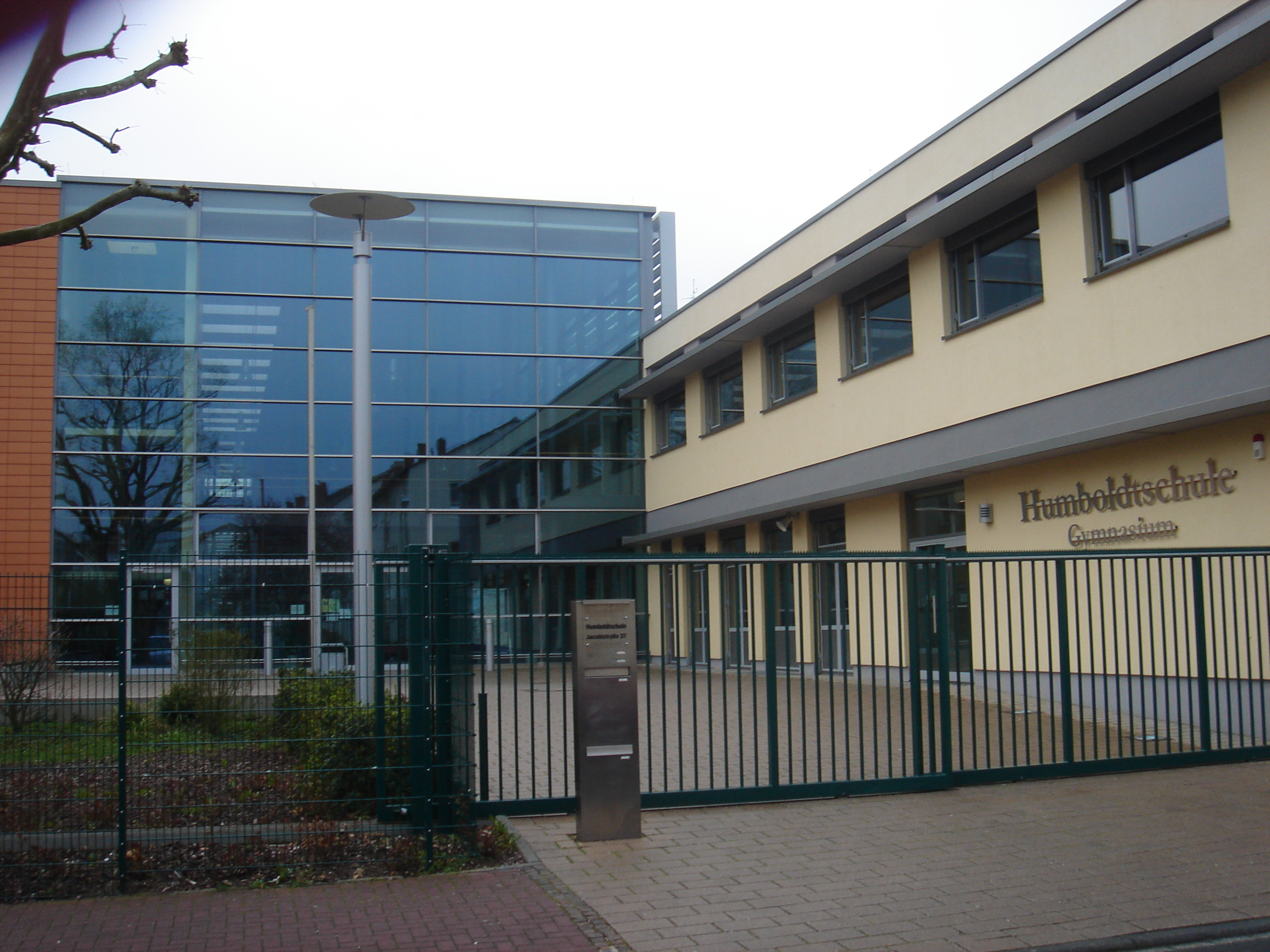
Principal entrance

The school was founded in 1900 as the Städtische Höhere Mädchenschule. In 1962 it moved to Jacobi Street (Jacobistraße). In 1967 boys were admitted for first time. So in 1968 the school was renamed Humboldtschule with the implementation of the mixed-sex education. At the end of 2005, the class wings and the administrative building were widely redecorated and modernized. Furthermore, a small cafeteria with 120 places was furnished. In school year 2005/2006 the school duration at the Humboldtschule was reduced from nine to eight years. So those students who started in grade 5 in that year or later get their Abitur after twelve school years in total, rather than thirteen years for students who started in grade 5 before that year.

== Lesson ==
The principal time is from 7:55 a.m. to 1:05 p.m.; the students in the sixth form (grades 11 to 13 until 2012 or 10 to 12 from 2010) continue until 3:20 p.m. Since school year 2004/2005 there has been a supervising break at mid-day from 1:05 p.m. until 1:50 p.m. During this time a snack or a luncheon in the school restaurant is offered. In the break the center with media is open. The students from grades 5 to 10 have lessons or activities in groups at mid-day which they have to visit only some days in a week.

== Distinctive features ==
=== Bilingual education ===
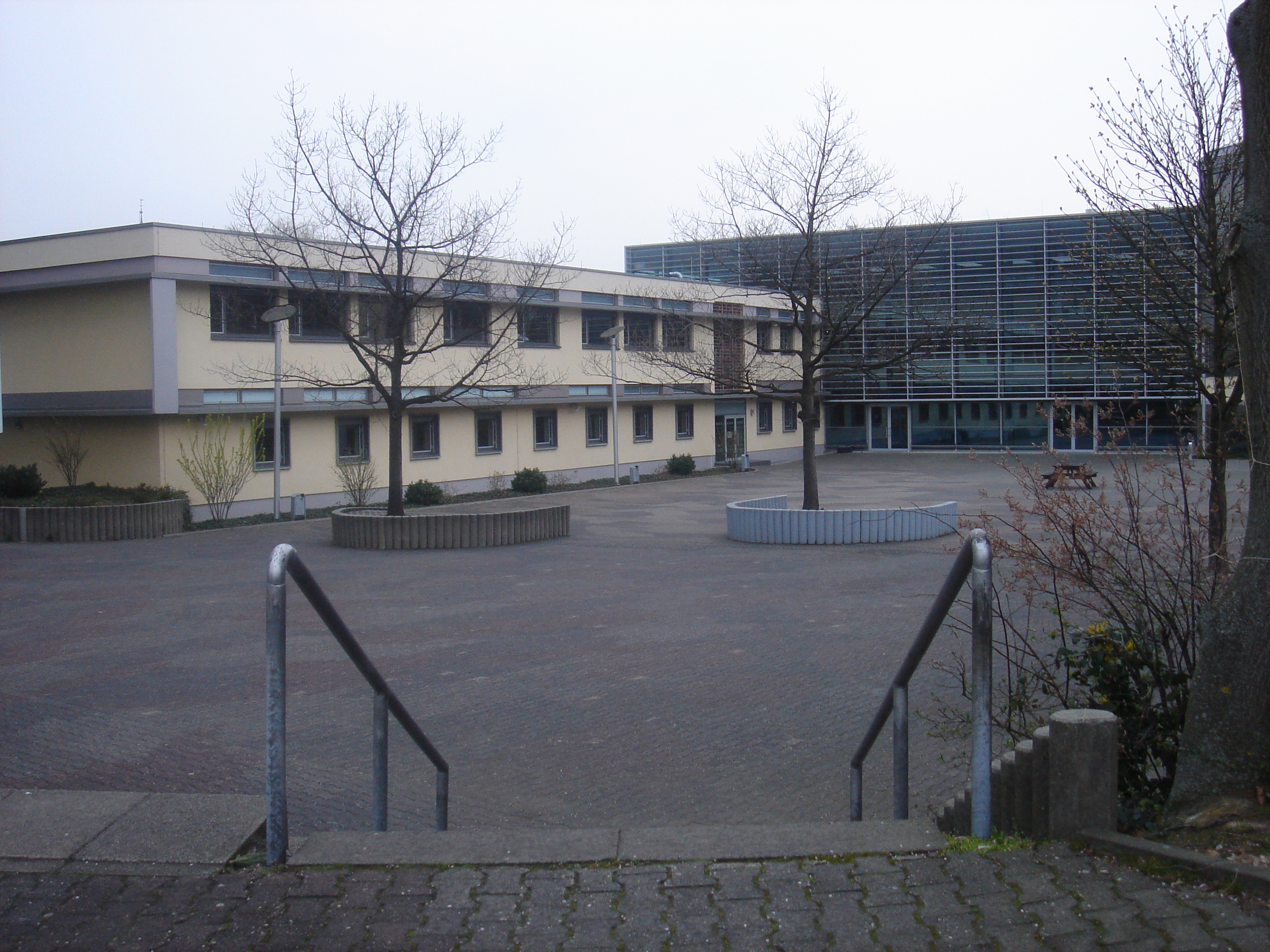
Schoolyard

The students can choose French as first foreign language with the choice of bilingual education in geography in classes 7 and 8. In classes 9 and 10 and also in the sixth form Oberstufe, history is offered as bilingual.
