= Gesamtschule am Gluckenstein =

Location
- Gluckensteinweg 99; 61350 Bad Homburg v. d. Höhe; Hochtaunuskreis; Hesse; Germany
- Coordinates: 50°14′25.37″N 8°35′49.27″E

Information
- School type: Public Gesamtschule (comprehensive school)
- Established: 1973
- School number: 6069
- Head of school: Roswitha Hahn
- Grades: 5–10
- Gender: Coeducational
- Website: gag.hochtaunuskreis.net

The Gesamtschule am Gluckenstein (abbreviation: GaG; English: Comprehensive school at the Gluckenstein) is a Gesamtschule (comprehensive school) in Bad Homberg vor der Höhe, Hesse, Germany.

The school has approximate 70 teachers and more than 800 students. In school year 2006/2007 the school time at the Gymnasium at the Gesamtschule am Gluckenstein was reduced from nine to eight years. So the students get their Abitur after twelve school years totally, not thirteen years more. But in school year 2008/2009 the school has decided to reintroduce the thirteen school years at the Gymnasium.
