= Herrlein =

Herrlein is a German surname. Notable people with the surname include:

- Friedrich Herrlein (1889–1974), German general
- Jürgen Herrlein (born 1962), German lawyer and historian
