= Moldau-Stipendium =

The Moldau-Stipendium ("Vltava Scholarship") was a literary and art prize of the Hessian Ministry for Science and the Arts (Hessisches Ministerium für Wissenschaft und Kunst), which was awarded from 1998 to 2010. The Ministry allowed artists to stay in the "Egon Schiele Art Centrum" located in Český Krumlov, Czech Republic by funding all costs for up to two months. Applicants had to have lived in Hesse for at least two years; prizewinners were selected by the Ministry.

== Recipients ==
- 1998 Claudia Kutzera-Huck, Juliana Jäger, Nelo Eckenheimer, Elisabeth Vierkotten
- 1999 Miriam Hartlaub, Heike Reich, Kirsten Kötter, Sonja Ruf, I. Struif, Kurt Drawert
- 2000 Pavel Odvody, Antje Siebrecht, Harry Oberländer, Kirsten Kötter, Gabi Schaffner, Bärbel Mühlschlegel
- 2001 Michel Lampe, Miriam Hartlaub, Anett Frontzek
- 2002 Brigit Arp, Thomas Henke, Mechthild Curtius, Olaf Hauke, Klaus Bergmann, Harald Marpe
- 2003 Alois Bröder, Miriam Hartlaub, Erika Breuer, Sabine Schiel, Karina Wellmer-Schnell, Michael Meinicke
- 2004 Christian Filips, Kerstin Lichtblau, Klaus Bergmann, Romana Menze–Kuhn, Bernhard Meyer, Olaf Velte
- 2005 Ulrike Krickau, Waltraud Munz, Wolfgang Luh, Karina Wellmer-Schnell, Nicholas Morris, Ritula Fränkel, Gerhild Werner, Pavel Odvody
- 2006 Michael Meinicke, Manfred Seifert, Verena Lettmayer, Sabine Rollnik, Hanne Junghans, Verena Freyschmidt, Solveig Ockenfuß, Judit Rozsas, Marion Dörre, Michael Bloek, Karsten Bott, Henner Drescher
- 2007 Paul-Hermann Gruner, Maike Häusling, Magda E. Hildebrand, Mia Hochrein, Astrid Korntheuer, Ruth Luxenhofer, Mayte Mari, Bianca Rampas, Anne-Kathrin Schreiner, Friedericke Walter, Karina Wellmer-Schnell
- 2008 Sabine Ulrich, Romana Alferi, Ingrid Wriedt, Jutta Herrmann, Teresa Dietrich, Eva Strautmann, Christiane Feser, Eva Weingärtner, Peter Kurzeck, Oliver Tüchsen, Bärbel G. Mühlschlegel
- 2009 Ona B., Martin Gabriel, Markus Hiesleitner, Magna Hildebrand, Siegfried Kärchner, Eike Lauen, Nick Oberthaler, Hans Werner Poschauko, Monika Romstein, Bodo Runte, Veronika Schubert, Oliver Tüchsen
- 2010 Katja Jüttemann, Waltraud Frese, Celia Amitsis, Henner Drescher, Harry Oberländer, Katrin Beger-Merla, Christian Schulteisz, Diane Preyer, Siegfried A. Fruhauf, Joachim Durrang, Karina Wellmer-Schnell
