= Olaf Velte =

German writer

Olaf Velte (born 7 June 1960) is a German writer.

== Life ==
Born in Bad Homburg vor der Höhe, After graduating from school in 1979, Velte initially trained as a publishing house clerk from 1981-1984. He then studied German language and literature, philosophy and theatre, film and television studies until 1994 at the Goethe University Frankfurt.

Velte writes poems, stories, essays, texts for radio and book reviews. He has been a freelance author and shepherd since 1993. In addition, he directs a freelance theatre group and has worked as a journalist for daily newspapers and newsletters since 2007. On 21 July 2020, the HR-Hessenschau broadcast a portrait of the lyricist. A 43-minute long portrait was broadcast by the Hr radio culture channel HR2 on 20 January 2020 in the series "Doppelkopf".

In terms of content, Velte's lyrical work is primarily concerned with the people and landscapes of the Taunus in history and the present. He interprets old field names, examines mythical social types such as robbers and field marksmen, and focuses on the Feldberg (879 m) as the most authoritative elevation in the Taunus. Originally, his creativity was stimulated by the generation-typical US Beat literature, which was also anchored in the Frankfurt-based Hessisches Literaturforum, which was groundbreaking for him. Later, in his own volumes of poetry, he dealt with historical greats such as Eduard Mörike, Wilhelm Raabe and Christian Reuter.

The married father of two children lives and works in Wehrheim/Taunus.

== Publications ==
- Niedriger Ackergang. Poems. 1995.
- Ein Kragen aus Erde. Stories. 2000.
- Herr Auditeur Grabbe. Tales. 2002.
- Landmarken. Storie. 2003.
- Neben mir einer, der sich Mörike nennt. 2004.
- Räuber Feuer Brüder. Poems. 2005.
- Mengfrucht. Poems, with etchings by Vroni Schwegler. 2006.
- Träumt Raabe. Tales. 2007.
- Schindäcker rauhe Gärten. Stories. Stadtlichter Presse, Wenzendorf 2008, ISBN 978-3-936271-35-5. With an afterword by Caroline Hartge.
- Mit der Axt. Stories. Stadtlichter Presse, Wenzendorf 2013, ISBN 978-3-936271-68-3. With an afterword by Werner Söllner.
- Ein paar Dichter. Poems. Axel Dielmann – Verlag, Frankfurt 2013, ISBN 978-3-86638-171-1.
- Reuters Kiste. Eine Exkursion. Axel Dielmann – Verlag, Frankfurt 2015, ISBN 978-3-86638-916-8.
- Ein gewisser Christian Reuter aus Kütten. Eine Familien- und Hofgeschichte. Axel Dielmann – Verlag, Frankfurt 2015, ISBN 978-3-86638-930-4.
- Unterm Feldberg. Poems. Stadtlichter Presse, Wenzendorf 2017, ISBN 978-3-936271-95-9.
- Die Gänge des Flurschütz. Poems, with woodcuts by Heike Küster. Stadtlichter Presse, Wenzendorf 2018.
- Schmales Licht. Stories. Stadtlichter Presse, Wenzendorf 2020, ISBN 978-3-947883-15-8.

== Contributions to anthologies and journals (selection) ==
- Axel Kutsch (ed.): Versnetze, Versnetze_zwei, Versnetze_drei. Deutschsprachige Lyrik der Gegenwart (2008, 2009, 2010).
- Theo Breuer (ed.): NordWestSüdOst. Gedichte von Zeitgenossen. 2003, ISBN 3-87512-192-9.
- Shafiq Naz (ed.): Der deutsche Lyrikkalender 2010. 2009.
- Literary magazines: Am Erker, Der Literaturbote, Faltblatt, Signum, Stadtgelichter among others

== Awards ==
- 2003: Förderpreis der Deutschen Schiller-Stiftung von 1859
- 2004: Moldau-Stipendium des Landes Hessen
