= Leila Trapmann =

Anglo-American author

Leila Gardner von Meister
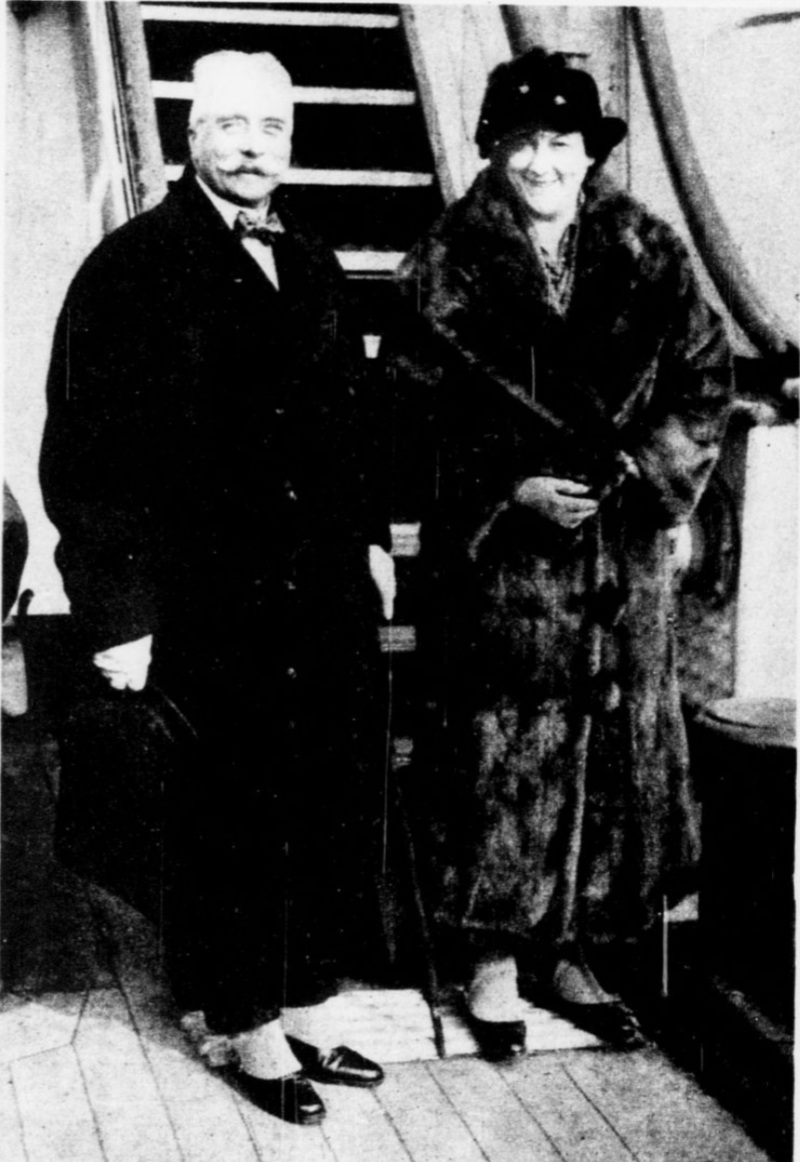
- Leila von Meister with her husband. 1925.
- Born: Leila Trapmann; 1871; Sunbury-on-Thames, England
- Died: 1957 (aged 85–86)
- Occupation: Author
- Spouse: Karl Wilhelm von Meister

Leila Gardner von Meister (née Trapmann; 1871 - 1957) was an Anglo-American author.

== Life and career ==
Trapmann was born in 1871 in Sunbury-on-Thames to German-American plantation owners from Charleston, South Carolina.

Trapmann wrote and illustrated The Spoofah and the Antidote in 1898.

In 1900, Trapmann married German politician Karl Wilhelm von Meister at St Peter's Church in London. They celebrated their silver wedding anniversary 25 years later.

Trapmann and Meister had their first child, Friedrich Wilhelm von Meister on 19 July 1903. Kaiser Wilhelm II telegrammed the family expressing his wish to become the child's godfather.

Trapmann died in 1957 in the United States.

== Works ==
- The Spoofah and the Antidote (1898)
- On Board the "Deutschland" (1925)
- Gathered Yesterdays (1968, posthumous). Memoir.
