= Kaiserin-Friedrich-Gymnasium =

Location
- Auf der Steinkaut 1–15; 61352 Bad Homburg v. d. Höhe; Hochtaunuskreis; Hesse; Germany
- Coordinates: 50.225°N 8.636°E

Information
- School type: Public Gymnasium
- Founded: 1550; 476 years ago
- School number: 5195
- Head of school: Jochen Henkel
- Grades: 5–12
- Gender: Coeducational
- Sixth form students: 406 (December 10, 2007)
- Newspaper: Viktoria
- Teachers: 121 (August 1, 2008)
- Website: www.kaiserin-friedrich.de

The Kaiserin-Friedrich-Gymnasium (abbreviation: KFG; Empress Frederick Gymnasium) is a secondary school in Bad Homburg vor der Höhe, Hesse, Germany.

== History ==
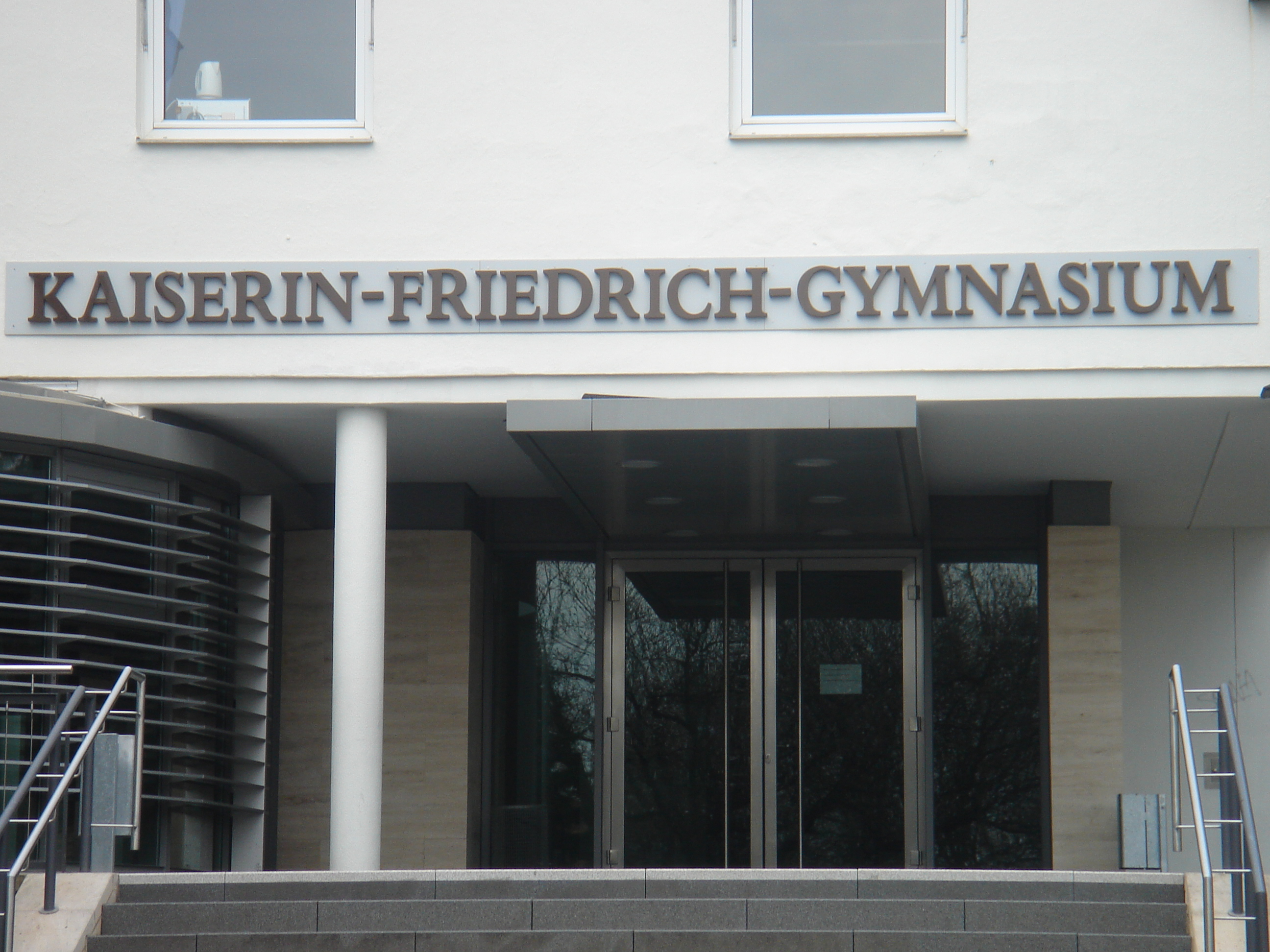
Principal entrance

The school was founded in 1550 as a private Latin school and is one of the oldest schools in the German-speaking region of Europe. In 1900 it received the name of Victoria, Princess Royal (1840–1901), the wife of Kaiser Friedrich III and daughter of Queen Victoria of the United Kingdom. From 1937 the school was named the Kaiserin-Friedrich-Schule (KFS), regaining its previous name Kaiserin-Friedrich-Gymnasium in February 2000. For centuries the school was for boys only, but destruction of the Bad Homburg's Lyzeum senior girls school in the Second World War led to girls being admitted in increasing numbers from the late 1940s.

== Education ==
The school has 116 teachers and 1,351 students, making it one of the largest schools in the Hochtaunuskreis. It is one of two Gymnasiums in Bad Homburg, along with the Humboldtschule (HUS).

In 2004 the school introduced the Abitur after twelve years, allowing schooling to be completed one year earlier than previously required.

In 2008 the school started offering bilingual teaching in English and German starting in Year 5.

== Notable alumni ==
- Jürgen Brosius (born 1948), professor of molecular genetics
- Jürgen Herrlein (born 1962), lawyer
- Susanne Klatten (born 1962), industrialist
- Stefan Quandt (born 1966), industrialist
- Georg Schramm (born 1949), psychologist and cabaret artist
