= Church of the Redeemer, Bad Homburg =

- Erlöserkirche, Bad Homburg
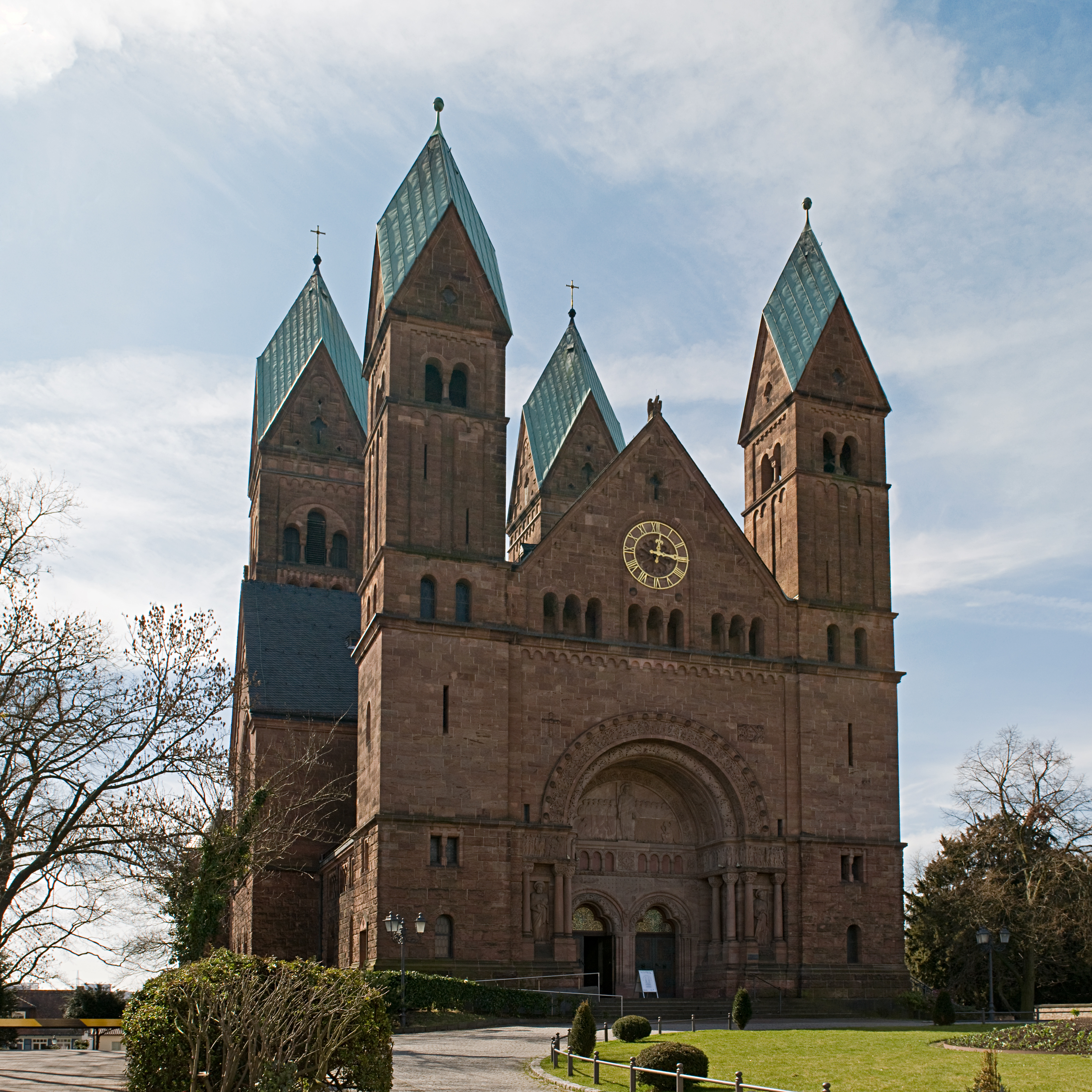
- Church of the Redeemer, Bad Homburg
- 50°13′35″N 8°36′42″E
- Location: Bad Homburg
- Country: Germany
- Denomination: Protestant
- Website: www.erloeserkirche-badhomburg.de

Architecture
- Functional status: Active
- Architect(s): Max Spitta and Franz Schwechten
- Architectural type: Neo-Romanesque
- Completed: 1908

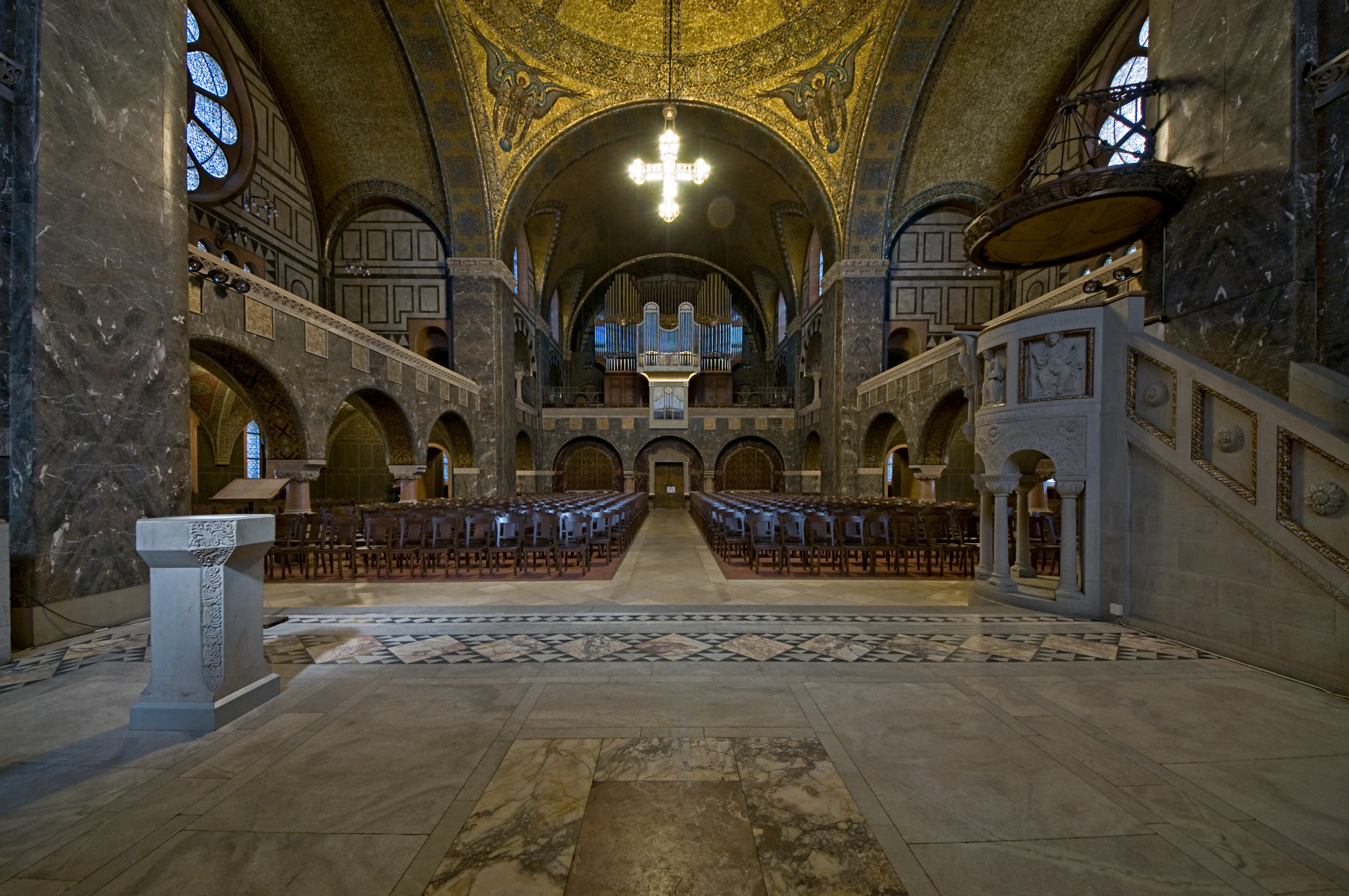
Center aisle of the church, view from the altar

The Church of the Redeemer (German: Erlöserkirche) of Bad Homburg belongs to the Protestant Church in Germany. Finished in 1908, the building is outwardly of a heavy, Romanesque Revival appearance, while its interior is in a neo-Byzantine style, with rich marble wall decorations and gold mosaics covering the domed ceiling, leading to the church sometimes being called 'Bad Homburg's Hagia Sophia'.

== History ==
The church was built to serve Bad Homburg's Lutheran Christians, who around the start of the 20th century suffered from lack of a sufficient congregation space. Its construction was paid for and the design supervised by Wilhelm II, the German Emperor, who had by then made Bad Homburg a summer residence town, and later often came to worship in the church, sitting in his own imperial box with a private entrance. Empress Auguste-Viktoria also provided the jewel-studded altar cross which was originally intended for the Church of the Redeemer in Jerusalem.

In 1901, the Berlin architect Max Spitta was entrusted with the construction plans for the church. However, as Spitta died in December 1902, architect Franz Schwechten finished the design in late Romanesque style. The foundation was laid in 1903 and the new church was inaugurated in the presence of the imperial couple on 17 May 1908. The building was primarily constructed by the Philipp Holzmann Company from Frankfurt. The numerous artisan works inside the building were the work of local craft shops.

== Architecture ==
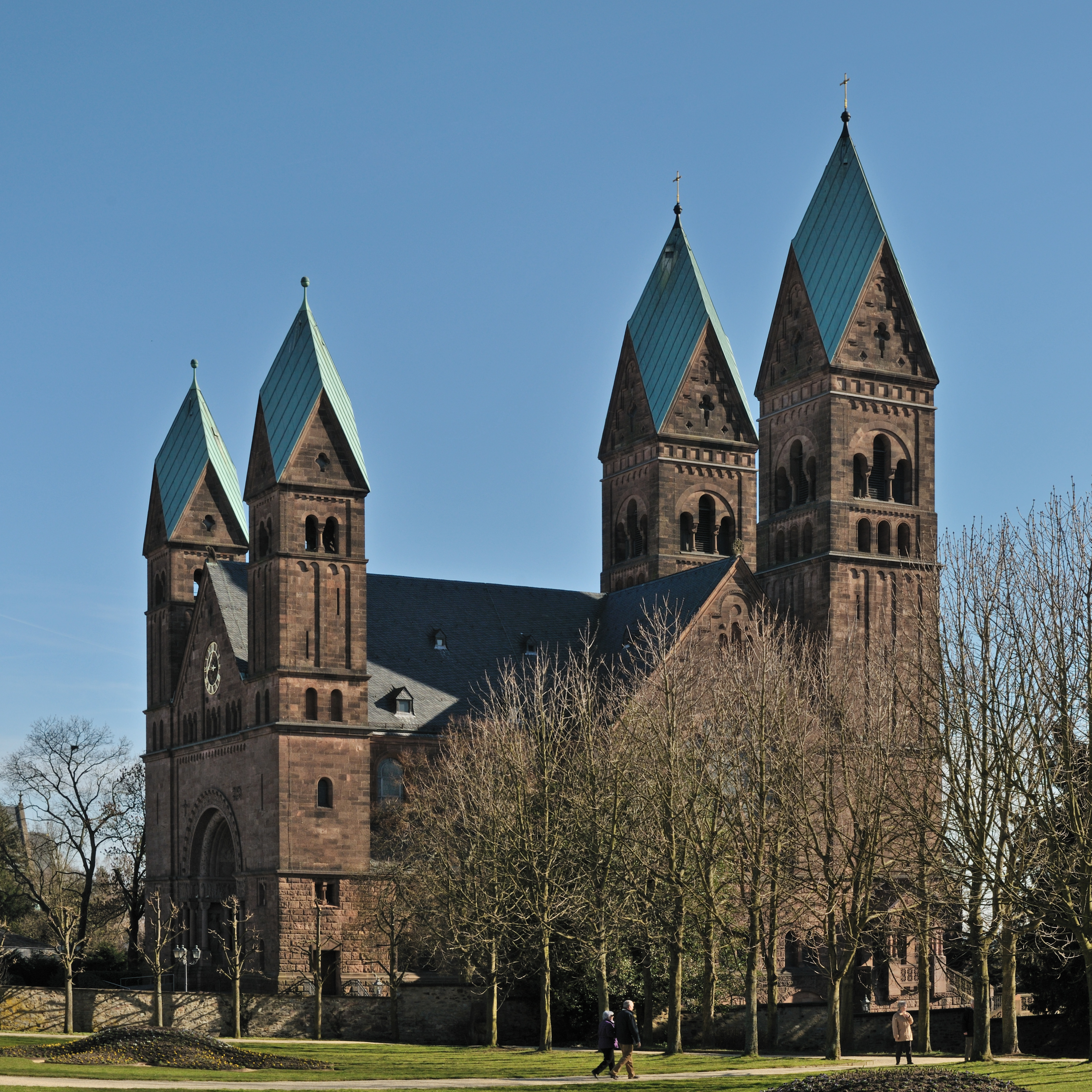
View from Bad Homburg castle

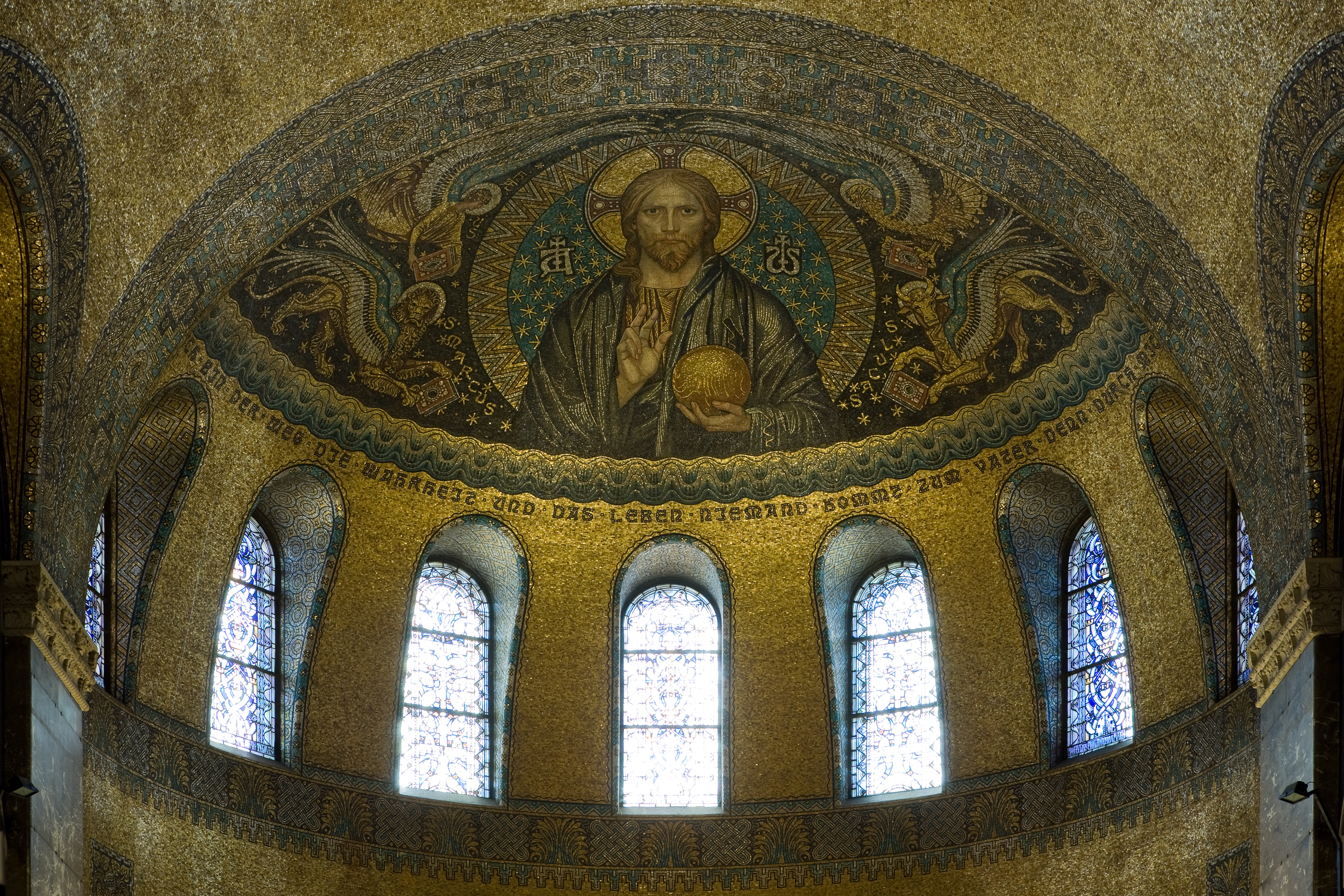
Pantocrator in the apse vault

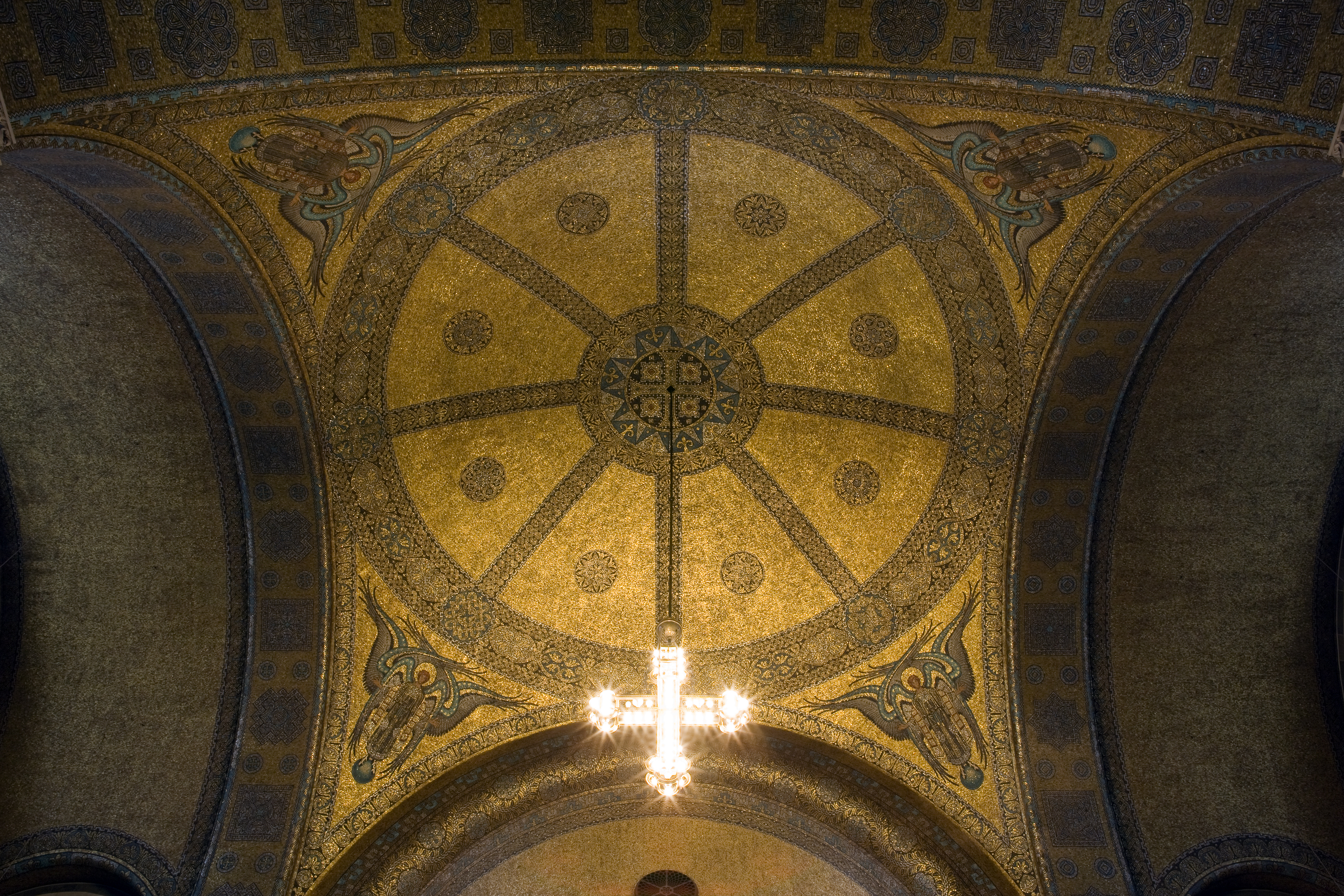
Gold mosaics covering the domed ceiling

The church is a cross-shaped structure basilica with four towers, with blind arcades and a high two-door portal arch for the tympanum. The towers on the altar side are larger and higher than those on the entrance side, which gives the building a noticeable shift in perspective, especially from afar.

The exterior façade was designed by Professor Gotthold Riegelmann and is reminiscent of Rhenish Imperial cathedrals. The interior design and decoration however are reminiscent of the Hagia Sophia. The interior consists of a mixture of Byzantine and Art Nouveau. The theme of Christ the Redeemer is ubiquitous throughout the church, and culminates in the Christ Pantocrator mosaic of the apse vault.

== Organs ==
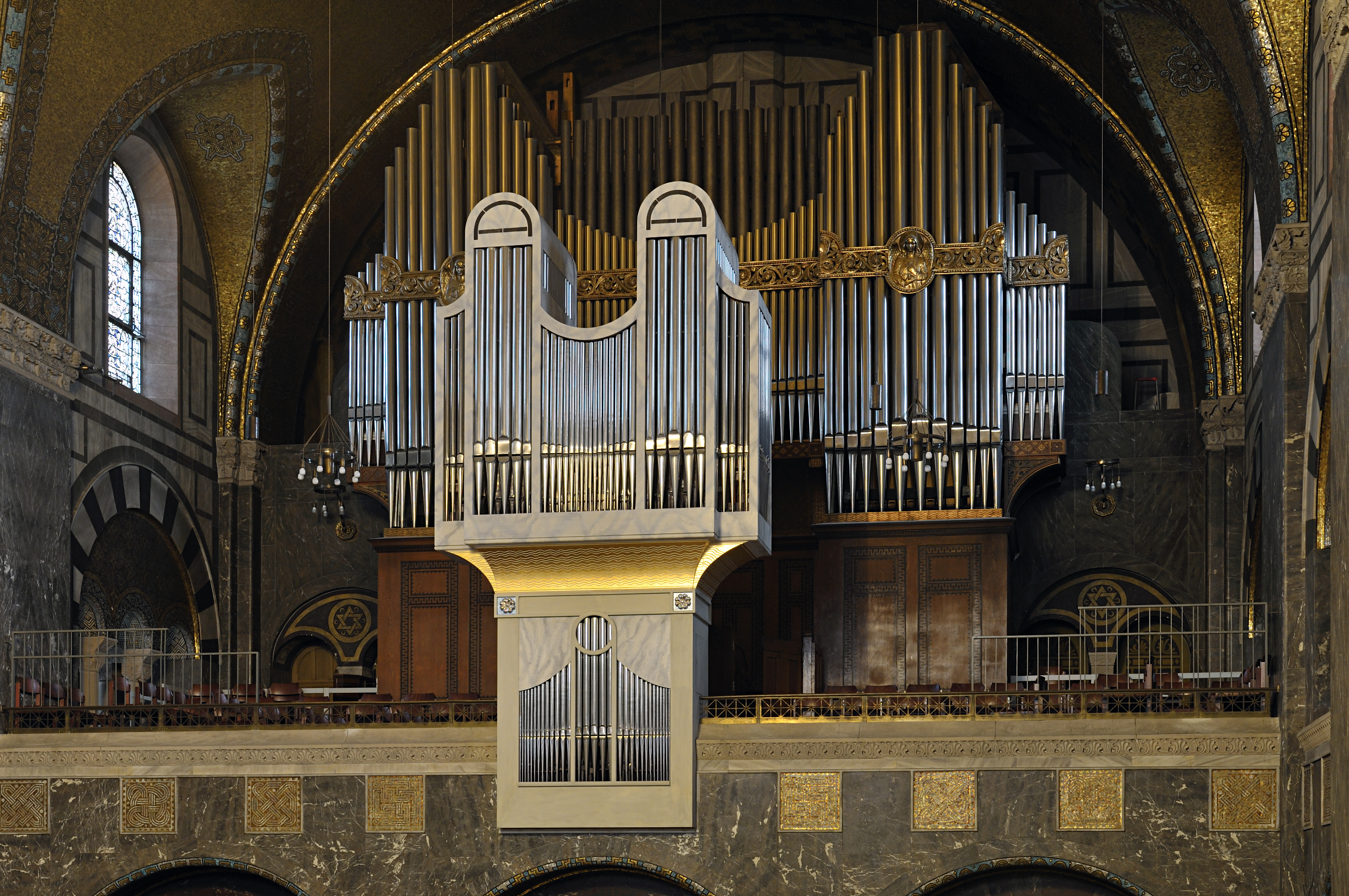
The organ

Two large church organs are installed in the Erlöserkirche. A turn-of-the-20th-century Sauer organ and a new Bach organ based on a 1742 Thuringian model.

=== Sauer-Organ (1908) ===
The Sauer organ whose sound outlet is located above the altar was built in 1908 by Wilhelm Sauer (Frankfurt / Oder).

=== Woehl-Organ (1990) ===
Gerald Woehl created the Bach organ in 1990, implementing a design of Johann Sebastian Bach. The organ is located on the gallery balustrade and forms a compositional unit with the Sauer organ.

== Church Bells ==
The church bells consist of five different bells. The largest weighs approximately 6,400 kg. The first four bells were cast in 1905 by the Andreas Hamm bell foundry in Frankenthal. In the 1920s, the Zwingli bell ('Zwingliglocke') was transferred from the neighboring village, Kirdorf, to serve as hour bell. Bells 1, 3 and 4 survived the First and Second World War. Although the second bell, the Landgraf bell ('Landgrafenglocke'), survived the First World War, it was damaged during the Second World War. From the shards of the second bell a new bell was cast by the Schilling bell foundry.

Nr.	Name	Casting year	Bell foundry, city	Weight (in kg)	Nominal (16tel)
1	Kaiserglocke	1905	Hamm, Frankenthal	6400	g^{0} +4
2	Landgrafenglocke	1948	Schilling, Apolda	2958	h^{0} +1
3	Elisabethenglocke	1905	Hamm, Frankenthal	1900	d^{1} −4
4	Mariannenglocke	1905	Hamm, Frankenthal	1500	e^{1} −3
5	Auferstehungsglocke	1932	Rincker, Sinn	800	g^{1} +5
–	Zwingliglocke	1912	Schilling, Apolda	?	es^{2}
