= Maria-Ward-Schule, Bad Homburg =

Maria-Ward-Schule
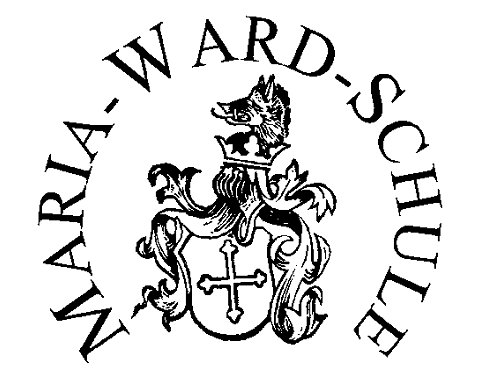

Location
- Weinbergsweg 60; 61348 Bad Homburg v. d. Höhe; Hochtaunuskreis; Hesse; Germany
- Coordinates: 50°13′44.30″N 8°37′47.58″E

Information
- School type: Private Realschule, Berufsfachschule
- Founded: 1896
- School number: 5035
- Head of school: Michaela Eder
- Grades: 5–10
- Gender: Girls
- Classes offered: the girls learnt subjects like arithmetic, home economics, German, English, Latin etc

The Maria-Ward-Schule (abbreviation: MWS; English: Maria Ward School) is a private school for girls in Bad Homburg vor der Höhe, Hesse, Germany.

The eponym is Mary Ward (1585–1645). The school has approximate 28 teachers and 400 students.
