= Jürgen Herrlein =

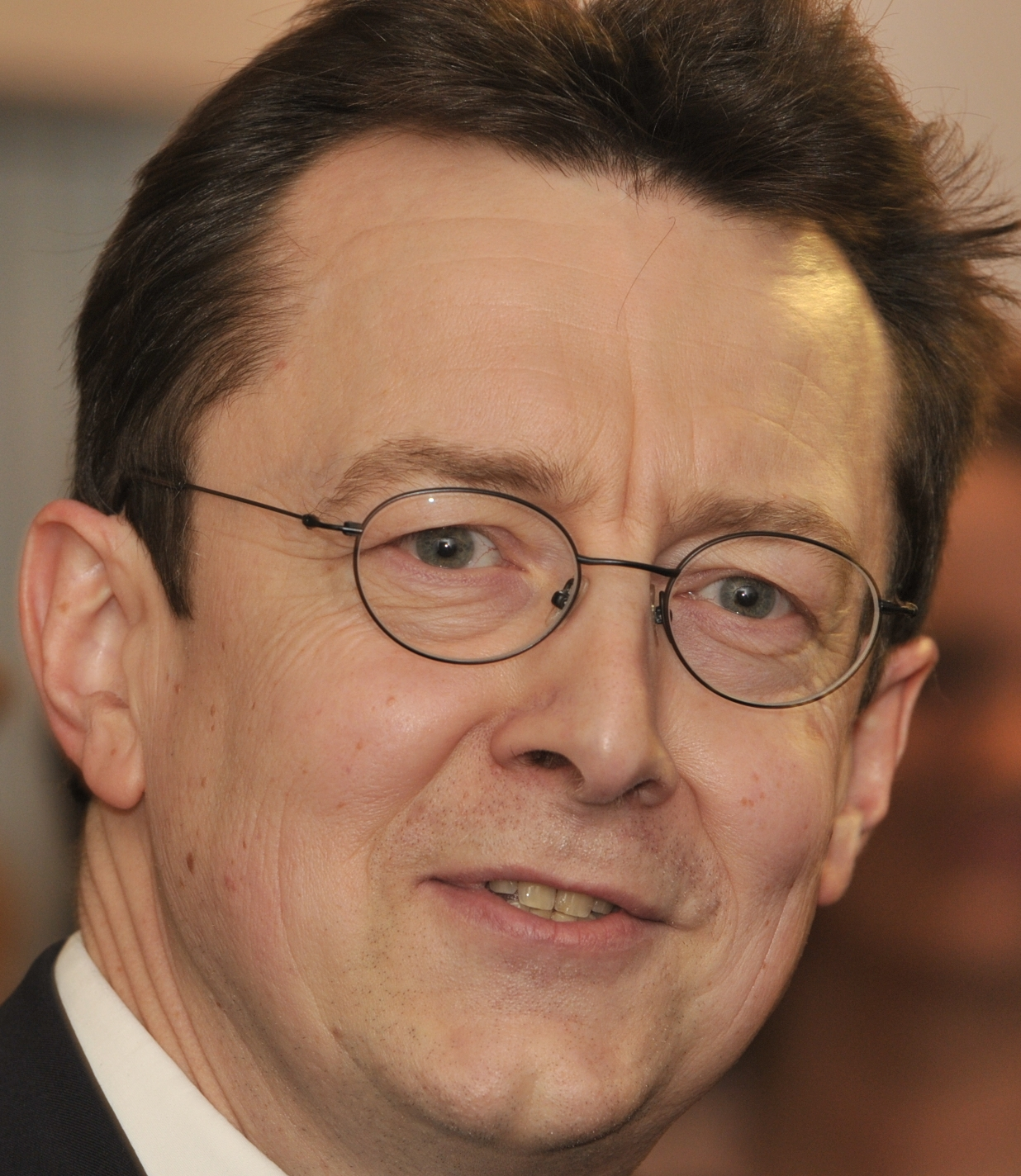
Jürgen Herrlein (2009)

Jürgen Herrlein (born 1962 in Regensburg) is a German lawyer and historian of academic corporations.

== Life ==
Herrlein grew up in Regensburg (Germany) and Friedrichsdorf/Taunus. After graduation in 1981 at the Kaiserin-Friedrich-Gymnasium in Bad Homburg, in 1982 he studied law at the Goethe University Frankfurt. After completion of studies and the legal clerkship (Referendariat), in 1994 Herrlein became a lawyer in Frankfurt/Main. Until 2000 he was partner in a law firm, from then until 2007 he was a managing partner of a lawyer and tax consultancy partnership. Since then he is working in his newly established office of specialized lawyers. Before he became a certified law specialist (Fachanwalt) for law of tenancy and for condominium in 2005, he became a certified specialist for tax law in 2000. Since the winter term 2005/2006 Herrlein is lecturer at the University of Frankfurt/Main. In 2006 he became editor of the Neue Zeitschrift für Miet- und Wohnungsrecht (NZM) which appears in the publishing house C.H. Beck. Herrlein is a member of the corporations Corps Austria (received 1987), Borussia-Polonia (1999), Silesia (2000), Masovia (2002) und Tigurinia (2007). The magazine Wirtschaftswoche counted him in 2010 among the top 25 tenancy lawyers of Germany. As a legal author, Herrlein deals mainly with law of tenancy and tax law, his historical publications deal mainly with the history of German Student Corps.

== Publications ==
Herrlein is the author of multiple books, essays and annotations. Amongst them are:

=== Legal works ===
- Jürgen Herrlein, Ronald Kandelhard (Hg.): Praxiskommentar Mietrecht, Recklinghausen: ZAP-Verlag, 4. Aufl. 2010, ISBN 978-3-89655-488-8
- Lutz Eiding, Lothar Ruf, Jürgen Herrlein: Öffentliches Baurecht in Hessen für Architekten, Bauingenieure und Juristen, München: C. H. Beck, 2. Aufl. 2007, ISBN 978-3-406-55716-3
- Jürgen Herrlein, Nikolaj Fischer: Kauf, Miete und Unterbringung von Pferden, Berlin: VWF, 2006, ISBN 978-3-89700-436-8
- Steuerrecht in der mietrechtlichen Praxis, Bonn: Deutscher AnwaltVerlag, 2007, ISBN 978-3-89655-266-2, ISBN 978-3-8240-0907-7

=== Historical works ===
- Die akademische Verbindung Austria Wien, in: Einst und Jetzt, Jahrbuch des Verein für corpsstudentische Geschichtsforschung, Bd. 37, 1992, 293 ff.
- Der Mainzer Revolutionär Paul Stumpf und seine Ahnen, in: Genealogie 1998, S. 356 ff.
- Genealogie der Familie Rothamer aus Rotham bei Straubing, in: Blätter des Bayerischen Landesvereins für Familienkunde, 2002, 37 ff.
- Corps Austria – Corpsgeschichte 1861-2001, Frankfurt am Main 2003
- Jürgen Herrlein, Silvia Amella Mai (Hg.): Josef Neuwirth (1855-1934), Von der Wiege bis zur Bahre, Autobiographie, Frankfurt am Main 2009
- Jürgen Herrlein, Silvia Amella Mai: Heinrich Beer und seine studentischen Erinnerungen an Breslau 1847 bis 1850, Hilden: WJK-Verlag 2009, ISBN 978-3-940891-27-3
- Jürgen Herrlein, Silvia Amella Mai: Georg Zaeschmar und seine studentischen Erinnerungen an Breslau 1873 bis 1875, Hilden: WJK-Verlag 2010, ISBN 978-3-940891-35-8

== Essays about Herrlein ==
- Friedhelm Golücke: Herrlein, Jürgen, in: Friedhelm Golücke (Hrg.), Verfasserlexikon zur Studenten- und Universitätsgeschichte, Köln: Sh-Verlag 2004, S. 143-144, ISBN 3-89498-130-X
