= Burnt layer =

Archaeology term

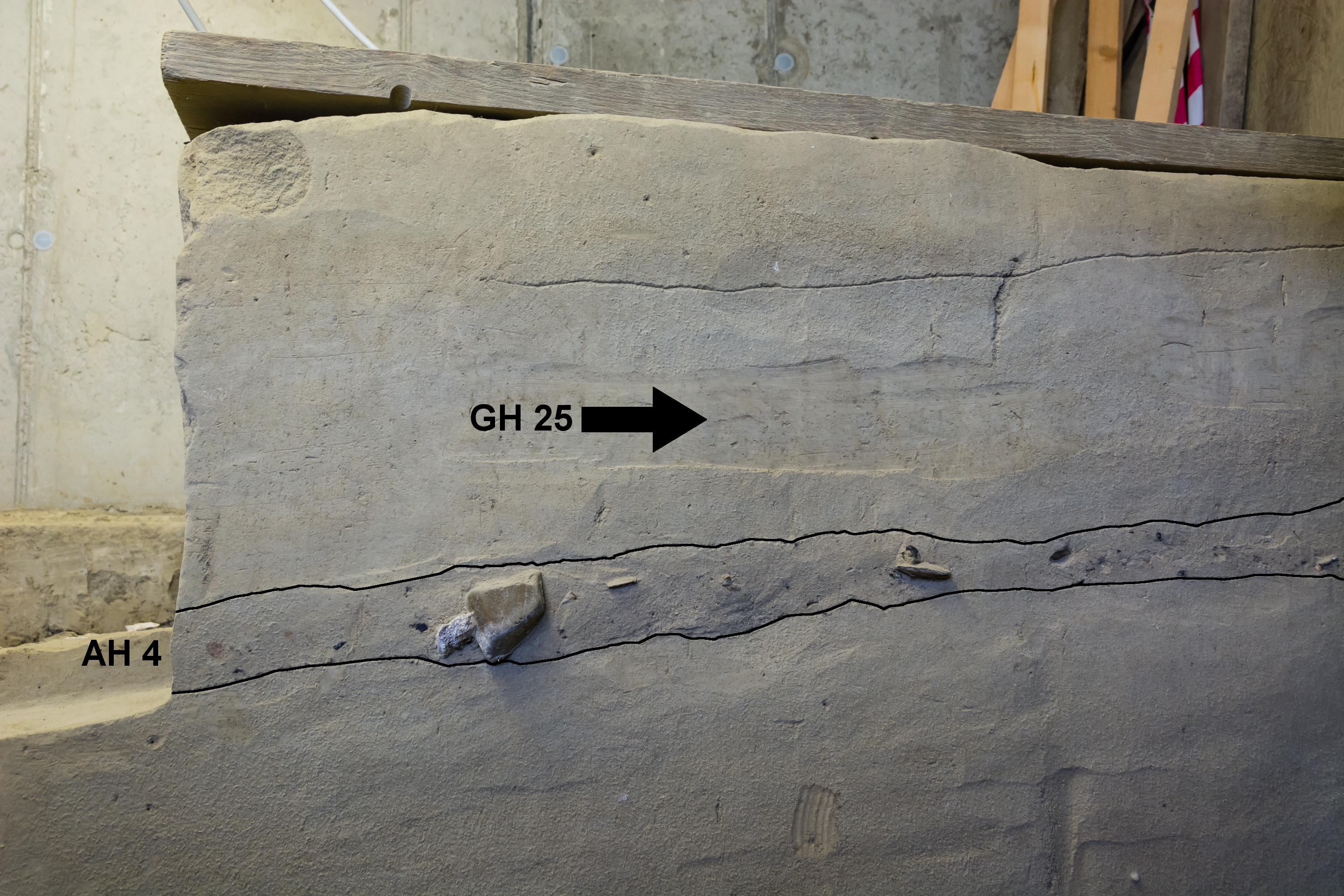
Krems-Wachtberg archaeological site. GH 25: Very fine burnt layer, probably due to steppe fires

A burnt layer or burned layer in archaeology is a stratum of earth that was formed primarily by the burning of objects or buildings. The extent of the layer is irrelevant. It can be the remains of a campfire as well as the remains of a burned down settlement.

Burnt layers are recorded in event stratigraphy, a sub-area of stratigraphy.
