= Karl Wilhelm von Meister =

German politician (1863–1935)

Doctor juris Karl Wilhelm von Meister
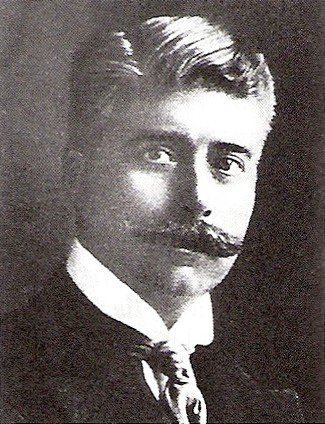
- Wilhelm von Meister, around 1895

District President of Wiesbaden
- In office 1905–1919
- Preceded by: Wilhelm Hengstenberg
- Succeeded by: Wilhelm Momm

District Administrator of Obertaunuskreis
- In office 1895–1903
- Preceded by: Bernhard von der Heydt
- Succeeded by: Gustav Ebbinghaus

District Administrator of Höchst
- In office 1893–1894
- Preceded by: August von Trott zu Solz
- Succeeded by: Otto von Steinmeister

Personal details
- Born: 2 February 1863 Frankfurt am Main
- Died: 14 February 1935 (aged 71) Geneva, Switzerland
- Education: University of Bonn; Humboldt University of Berlin; Heidelberg University

Military service
- Allegiance: Kingdom of Prussia
- Branch/service: Prussian Army
- Rank: Rittmeister
- Unit: 13th Bockenheimer Hussars

Karl Wilhelm von Meister (3 February 1863 – 14 February 1935) was a German politician and diplomat.

== Life and career ==
Meister was born as the eldest son of Carl Friedrich Wilhelm Meister, one of the co-founders of Hoechst AG, and his wife Marie née Becker. Meister went to school at the Lessing-Gymnasium in Frankfurt and later studied law at the University of Bonn and at the Humboldt University of Berlin. He earned a doctorate in law at Heidelberg University in 1886. From 1892 to 1894 he was district administrator of the newly created Hoechst District. 1895 he was nominated district administrator of the District of Obertaunus where he remained until 1903. In 1896, Meister was ennobled by Kaiser Wilhelm II. After leaving the post of administrator of Obertaunus, he worked from 1902 until 1905 in Berlin and later from 1905 until 1919 as district president of Wiesbaden.

On 1 June 1919 during the German Revolution of 1918–1919, Meister resigned after the French administrator demanded he submit to the separatist government.

From 1919 to 1926 he was member of the supervisory board of Farbwerke Hoechst and from 1926 to 1935 of I.G. Farben AG.

In 1930, Meister represented the Weimar Republic as a delegate to the League of Nations in Geneva.

== Family life ==
Meister married Adele Jordan de Rouville on 31 October 1892, and had two children. Following the death of his first wife on 22 June 1897, Meister married Leila Trapmann on 18 January 1900 at St Peter's Church in London. The couple had two children.

== Bibliography ==
- Chronikblätter für die Familie Luyken und ihre Anverwandten [Chronicle sheets for the Luyken family and their relatives] (in German). Vol. 2. 1935. pp. 326–329 – via Familienverband Luyken.
- Koch, Fritz (1996). Klötzer, Wolfgang; Hock, Sabine; Frost, Reinhard (eds.). Frankfurter Biographie [Frankfurt Biography] (in German). Vol. 2. Waldemar Kramer. p. 30. ISBN 3782904591.
