= Abitur after twelve years =

School reform in Germany

Abitur after twelve years, or Gymnasium in eight years (G8 or Gy8) describes the reduction of the time spent at a university-preparatory high school from nine school years to eight school years, by having the students take more classes each year. It is implemented in many States of Germany. In the states of Berlin, Brandenburg, and Mecklenburg-Vorpommern, the reduction meant a change from seven years to six years spent in high school because in these states primary education continues until Class 6. In Saxony and Thuringia it is already a long established norm to take the Abitur after twelve years. The principal argument for the reduction is the comparatively long times for vocational education in Germany.

Some federal states, chiefly in the former Federal Republic of Germany, have already reversed the reform even though sound academic insights into its effects are scarce.

== Year of reform by state ==
State	Introduction	Previously in effect
Baden-Württemberg	Abolished; final G8 graduating cohort in 2031	2012 until 2031
Bavaria	Abolished	2012 until 2024
Berlin	Yes (2012–)	1949 until 2000 (East Berlin)
Brandenburg	Yes (2012–)	1949 until 2000
Bremen	Yes (2012–)	
Hamburg	Yes (2010–)	
Hesse	Yes (2013–) (choice between G8 and G9 is free)	
Mecklenburg-Vorpommern	Yes (2008–)	1949 until 2001
Lower Saxony	Abolished	2011 until 2019
North Rhine-Westphalia	Abolished; final G8 graduating cohort in 2025	2012 until 2025
Rhineland-Palatinate	Yes (2016–) (only as a pilot project for full-time schools)	
Saarland	Abolished; final G8 graduating cohort in 2028	2009 until 2028
Saxony	Yes (1949–)	
Saxony-Anhalt	Yes (2007–)	1949 until 2000
Schleswig-Holstein	Abolished; final G8 graduating cohort in 2025	2016 until 2025
Thuringia	Yes (1949–)	

== Criticism ==
In part, parent, teacher and student organizations express criticism, exclusively from the Western States of Germany. In spite of the removal of one school year, the contents of the previous thirteen years were in the curriculum. This meant that the school timetable was enlarged and that the students had to be at school for between 32 and 40 periods a week. With the homework given and exam preparations, a school week was estimated to be 45 to 55 periods.

However, little empirical evidence assesses the effect of the compression of instructional periods into fewer years of schooling on student outcomes.
