= List of schools in Ukraine =

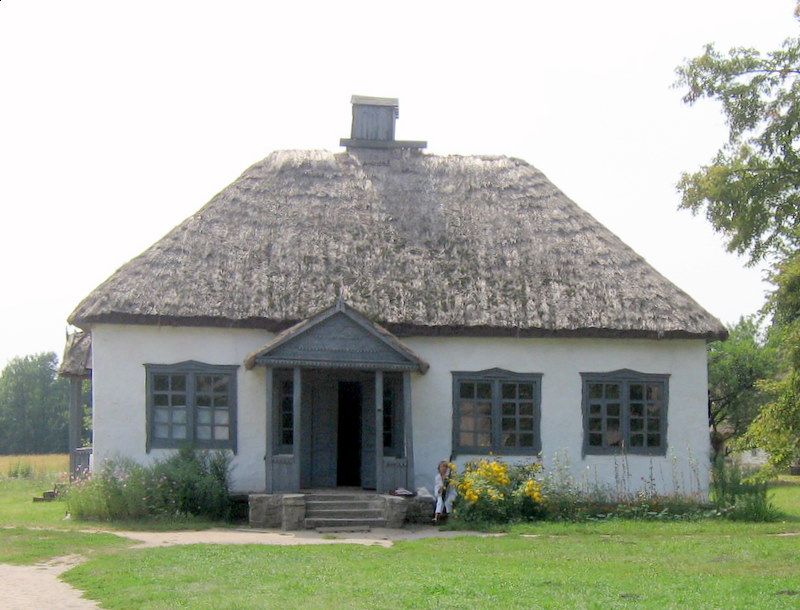
A Parish School of Dnieper Region from Museum of Folk Architecture and Folkways of Ukraine

The following is a partial list of secondary schools in Ukraine.

== Crimea ==
- Simferopol gymnasium No. 1, Simferopol (est. 1812)
- Gymnasium No. 9, Simferopol (est. 1917)
- School of the Future, Yalta (est. 1971)

== Volyn Oblast ==
- Lutsk Gymnasium 21, Lutsk (est. 1986)

== Zhytomyr Oblast ==
- Biotechnological Lyceum "Radovel", Radovel (est. 1886)

== Zakarpattia Oblast ==
- Uzhhorod Gymnasium, Uzhhorod (est. 1613)

== Kyiv ==
- IT STEP School Kyiv (est. 2019)
- Deutsche Schule Kiew
- European Collegium Private School (est. 2002)
- Kyiv Christian Academy (est. 1993)
- Kyiv International School (est. 1992)
- Kyiv Lysenko State Music Lyceum (est. 1934)
- Kyiv Natural Science Lyceum No. 145 (est. 1962)
- Kyiv Specialized School No. 57 (est. 1939)
- Kyiv Secondary School No. 189 (est. 1967)
- Kyiv Specialized School No. 98 (est. 1966)
- Kyiv Specialized School No. 159 (est. 1975)
- Lycée Français Anne de Kyiv (est. 1994)
- Meridian International Lyceum (est. 2001)
- Pechersk School International (est. 1995)
- Shevchenko State Art School (est. 1937)
- Ukrainian Humanities Lyceum (est. 1991)
- Ukrainian Physics and Mathematics Lyceum (est. 1963)
- Ukrainian medical Lyceum (est. 1991)

== Ivano-Frankivsk Oblast ==
- Ukrainian gymnasium No. 1, Ivano-Frankivsk

== Lviv Oblast ==
=== Lviv ===
- Lviv Academic Gymnasium (est. 1784)
- Lviv Physics and Mathematics Lyceum (est. 1991)
- St. Mary Magdalene High School No. 10 in Lviv (est. 1818)

== Odesa Oblast ==
- Lyceum IT Step School Odesa (est. 2019)
- Bolhrad Gymnasium, Bolhrad (est. 1858)
- Fontanka School, Odesa
- French International School of Odesa, Odesa (est. 2013)
- Odesa Secondary School No. 121, Odesa (est. 1937)

== Rivne Oblast ==
- Ukrainian Gymnasium, Rivne

== Khmelnytskyi Oblast ==
- Lyceum IT Step School Kremenchuk (est. 2020)

== Chernihiv Oblast ==
- Panteleimon Kulish Gymnasium, Borzna (est. 1912)
