= School of the Future =

School of the Future can refer to:

- School of the Future (New York City)
- School of the Future (Philadelphia)
- School of the Future (Sao Paulo - Brasil)
- School of the Future (Yalta)
