= KCA =

KCA may refer to:

- IATA code for Kuqa Qiuci Airport, China
- Kalam Cosmological Argument
- KCA DEUTAG, oil and gas services company
- Kenya College of Accountancy
- Kerala Cricket Association
- Klawock Cooperative Association, federally recognized Native American tribe in Alaska
- Konami Corporation of America, the North American subsidiary of Konami
- Nickelodeon Kids' Choice Awards
- Kyiv Christian Academy
- Kikuyu Central Association
- Krupp cemented armour

kca may refer to:

- Khanty or Ostyak language, ISO-639-3 code
