= Halyna Yagenska =

Halyna Yagenska Ukrainian: Ягенська Галина Василівна
- Ягенська Галина Василівна
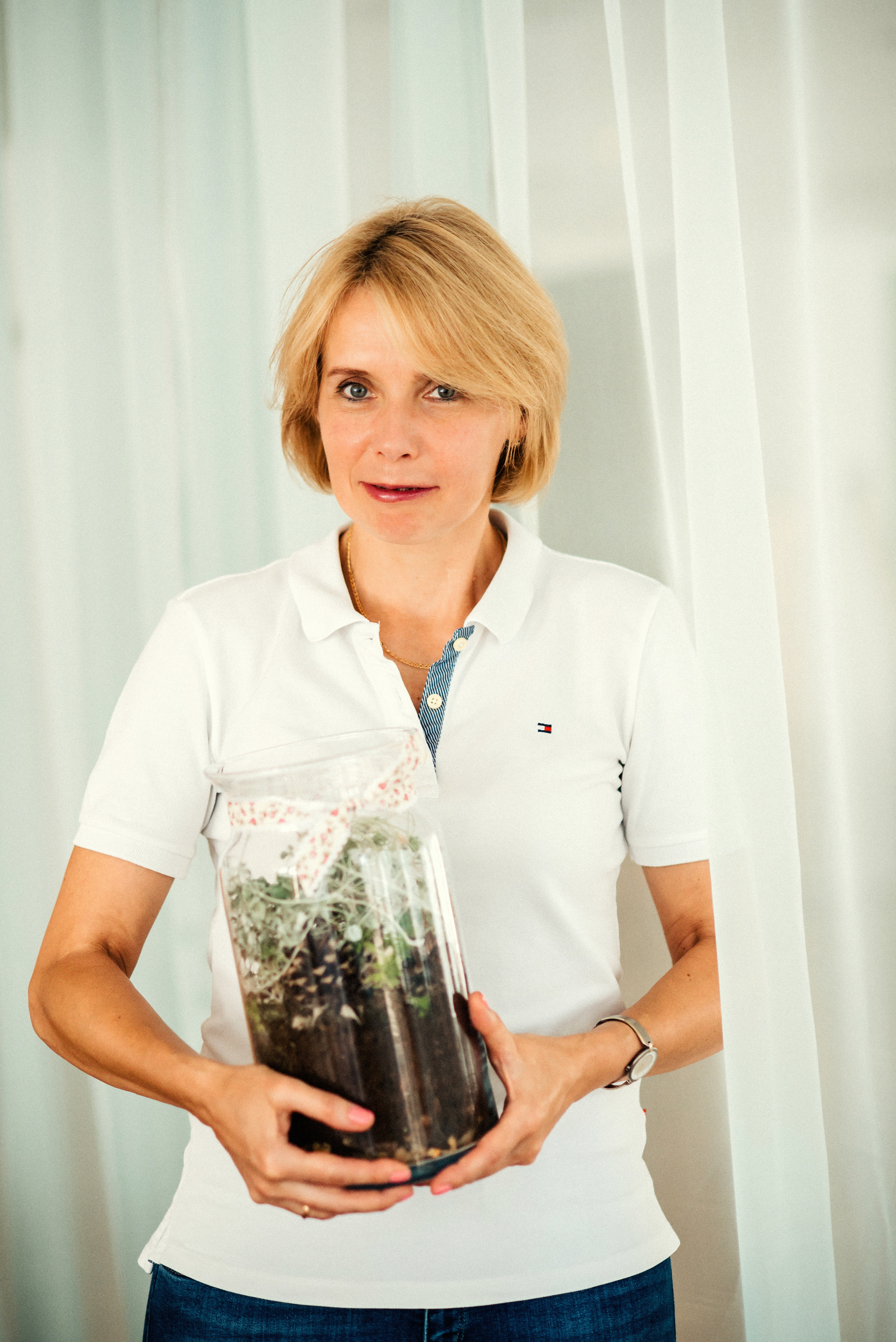
- Born: November 19, 1966 (age 59); Lutsk
- Citizenship: Soviet Union → Ukraine
- Education: Lesya Ukrainka East European National University
- Children: 2
- Awards: Merited teacher of Ukraine (2004), People's teacher of Ukraine (2020), Order of Merit (Ukraine) III class (2009), Order of Merit (Ukraine) II class (2015)

Halyna Vasylivna Yagenska (Ukrainian: Гали́на Васи́лівна Яге́нськ; born November 19, 1966) is the People's Teacher of Ukraine (2020), as the winner of National Ukrainian competition "Teacher of the Year" (in the subject biology). She holds a PhD in Pedagogy awarded in 2012. She was awarded the Order of Merit ІІІ class in 2009 and also the Order of Merit ІІ class (2015).

== Biography ==
Halyna Yagenska was born in 1966 in Lutsk; she graduated with a degree in teaching in 1988 from the Department of Natural and Geosciences at the Lesya Ukrainka East European National University (called Lutsk State Teachers’ Institute at the time).

Halyna Yagenska is a biology teacher at Lutsk elementary, middle, and high school No. 21. She is also an associate professor (Ukr. Docent) at the department of Theory and methods for school teaching at the Volyn Institute of Postgraduate Pedagogical Education. Her students are frequent winners at the city, oblast. Ukrainian and international Olympiads in biology and ecology, Minor Academy of Sciences research competitions, Ukrainian Biologists' Tournament. Halyna Yagenska is also recognized as the «Teacher of the Year» in a Volyn section of Ukrainian program "People of the XXI century".

Halyna created a unique biology curriculum titled "Forming the scientific competency in students while learning biology".

She is also the author of specialized high school courses "Adaptive physiology" and "Basics Statistics for applications in biological research". Halyna founded a specialized high school course "Human health", where students learn biology in English.

Halyna participated in several international training programs, including Ukrainian Teachers’ visit to ELLS EMBL at the Molecular Biology lab in Heidelberg, Germany, April 13–14th (2005) and І Science school for biology and chemistry teachers from Ukraine at the XLAB, Göttingen, Germany (2013);

Halyna participated in an international (Ukraine-Israel) educational project "10minschool" 10minschool.com», where she recorded 31 biology lessons. These are now used for remote learning in Ukrainian high schools.

Halyna Yagenska is a co-author of a series of scientific works, in particular:

- Variability of and the impact of weather on blood pressure and pulse of teenagers (2002)
- Teacher-student cooperation during the scientific research in biology (2004)
- How to prepare gifted students for tournaments in biology (2005)
- Didactic theater during a biology lesson (teaching methodology) (2005)
- Prepare a team of students for Biology Tournament (teaching methodology) (2005)
- Biology lab notebook for grade 7 (Ukr. "Я дослідник. Біологія. 7 клас"), ISBN 978-617-656-949-7, Osvita

Co-author of the series of biology textbooks, published by "Osvita" publishing company:

- Biology for grade 6 (Ukr. «Біологія: підручник для 6 кл. загальноосвітніх навчальних закладів»), 2014, ISBN 978-617-656-308-2. Co-authors: Kostikov I U, Volgin S O, Dod V V, Syvolob A V, Dovhal I V, Jolos O V, Skpypnyk N V, Tolstanova H M, Hodosovtsev O Ye.
- Biology for grade 7 (Ukr. «Біологія: підручник для 7 кл. загальноосвітніх навчальних закладів»), 2015. Co-authors: Kostikov I U, Volgin S O, Dod V V, Syvolob A V, Dovhal I V, Jolos O V, Skpypnyk N V, Tolstanova H M, Hodosovtsev O Ye.
- Biology for grade 8 (Ukr. «Біологія: підручник для 8 класу загальноосвітніх навчальних закладів»), 2016, ISBN 978-617-7012-35-0. Co-authors: Dovhal I V, Dod V V, Jolos O V, Skpypnyk N V, Tolstanova H M.
