= UPML =

UPML may refer to:

- Ukrainian Physics and Mathematics Lyceum, a high school in Kyiv, Ukraine.
- Uniaxial Perfectly Matched Layer, numerical truncation methodology.
