= Kyiv Specialized School No. 98 =

Location
- 7 Ivana Mykytenka Street; Dnipro Raion, Kyiv, 02139; Ukraine
- Coordinates: 50°29′11″N 30°35′48″E

Information
- Type: Comprehensive school, Public, Specialized school
- Established: September 1, 1966
- Principal: Liubov Lytvyn
- Grades: 1–11
- Website: www.98.kiev.ua

The 98th Specialized School or officially the Kyiv Specialized School No.98 with deep learning of English (Ukrainian: Київська спеціалізована школа № 98 з поглибленим вивченням англійської мови) is an ordinary public school which provides compulsory and specialized education.

== See also ==
- Kyiv Secondary School No. 189
- Kyiv Specialized School No. 159
