= Kyiv Specialized School No. 159 =

Location
- 22 Generala Tupikova Street; Solomianka Raion, Kyiv, 03058; Ukraine
- Coordinates: 50°26′27″N 30°26′20″E

Information
- Type: Comprehensive school, Public, Specialized school
- Established: September 1, 1975
- Grades: 5–11

The 159th Specialized School or officially Specialized School No. 159 including in depth English learning, Solomianka raion, Kyiv municipality (Ukrainian: Спеціалізована школа № 159 ІІ-ІІІ ступенів з поглибленим вивченням англійської мови Солом’янського району м. Києва) is an ordinary public school which provides compulsory and specialized education.

== See also ==
- Kyiv Specialized School No. 98
- Kyiv Secondary School No. 189
