= Odesa Secondary School No. 121 =

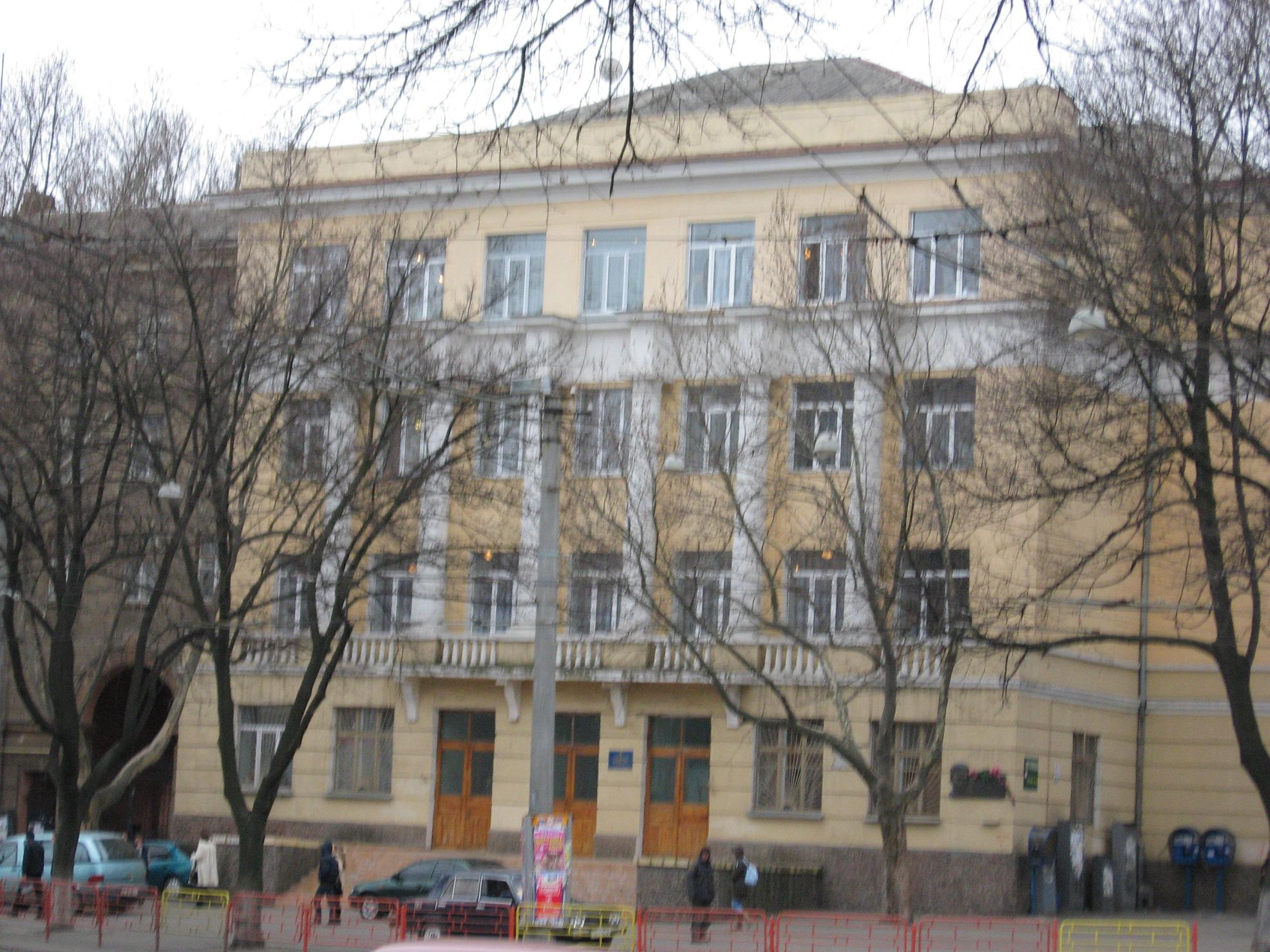

Location
- 1 Tolstoy Street; Prymorskyi Raion, Odesa, 65023; Ukraine
- Coordinates: 46°28′58″N 30°43′46″E

Information
- Type: Comprehensive school, Public, Specialized school
- Established: September 1, 1937
- Principal: Semeniuk Liudmyla Mykolaivna
- Grades: 1–11
- Website: prvo.od.ua/school/s121/ (in Ukrainian)

The 121st Secondary School or officially Comprehensive Secondary School No. 121 with Deep Learning of Foreign Languages of Prymorskyi Raion of Odesa Municipality (Ukrainian: Середня загальноосвітня школа І-ІІІ ступенів № 121 з поглибленим вивченням іноземних мов Приморського району м. Одеси) is an ordinary public school which provides compulsory and specialized education.

== History ==
The school was opened in 1937 and is located near the Odesa Orthodox Cathedral. The school building was built on a standard project (based on designs by architect L.B. Belkin).

English at the school has had deeper learning since 1954. The basic language of training is Ukrainian.

== Specializations ==
- English
- French
- Polish
- Russian

== Principals ==
- 1944—1949: Fedchenko Zakharii Terentiiovych (1885—1955)
- 1951—1966: Fedchuk Petro Lukych
- 1966—1970: Stezhko Pavlo Mykolayovych
- 1970—1973: Yevdoshenko Hanna Yakivna (1928—2007)
- 1973—1989: Volkova Inna (Engelsina) Mykolaivna (1930—1990)
- Since 1989: Semeniuk Liudmyla Mykolaivna (1948)
