= European Collegium Private School =

Private school in Kyiv, Ukraine

Location
- Siechenova str. 9 Kyiv, Holosiivskyi District, 03127; Ukraine

Information
- Type: Private educational institution with day school and kindergarten
- Religious affiliation: secular
- Established: 2002
- Local authority: Holosiivskyi District
- Principal: Ms. Iryna Isko
- Staff: 90 (2019)
- Gender: Mixed
- Age: 5 to 18
- Colours: Navy blue and beige
- Language: Ukrainian
- Newspaper: Collegium Times
- Website: http://www.eurocollegium.com/en/

European Collegium Private School (Приватна Школа Європейський Коллегіум; EC) is a private school for 5 to 18 year-olds in the city of Kyiv, Ukraine. In the year 2018–19, there were 320 pupils on roll. The school is a mixed, bilingual, inclusive community comprehensive school.

The school is part of a Cambridge English School Program and Microsoft Showcase Educational Program.
