= School of the Future (São Paulo – Brasil) =

Brazilian research laboratory

The School of the Future of University of São Paulo (Portuguese: Escola do Futuro da Universidade de São Paulo), is a Brazilian interdisciplinary laboratory investigating the impact of new communications technologies on learning at all educational levels. A great difference from a conventional laboratory is that this really acts working on Education and Technology, more than research.

The School of the Future was created in 1989 as a departmental laboratory in the School of Communications and Arts. Due to its growth and increasingly interdisciplinary nature, the school was in 1993 placed under the aegis of the Office of the Dean of Research, where it continues to flourish, having become a financially self-sustaining and independent from the University budget.

The director of the interdisciplinary laboratory, since its inception, was Professor Fredric Litto. However, since September 2006, the new director of the School of the Future is Professor Brasilina Passarelli.

== Principals ==
1. A commitment to research, the discussion and the evaluation of different educational strategies, privileging those that incorporate, on one hand, the most modern concepts on the processes of cognition human being and, on the other one, the new technologies of information.
2. Developing didactic methodologies and materials that have conferred a new dynamism to education and distance learning.
3. Prepare new generations of educators who see in the interface between education and communication as a fertile field for creativity, discernment and constant perfecting.
4. Promote the acceleration of the interchange of ideas and experiences between educators and academic institutions through the accomplishment of courses, seminaries, workshops and other events. It is intended, thus, to conciliate the university research with the practical one of the classroom.
5. Serve as a model of partnership between the university, society and different agencies and spheres of government, all working together towards the development of education in Brazil. This commitment provides the foundation for a new horizon of social justice; the construction and exercise of the citizenship in our country (Brazil).
