= Rivne Ukrainian Gymnasium =

Rivne Ukrainian gymnasium (RUG) is a new type school in Rivne, Ukraine. This is reborned First Rivne Ukrainian gymnasium that was founded in 1923 and worked till 1939. In 2003 RUG celebrated 80th anniversary.
