= Radovel =

Village in Zhytomyr Oblast, Ukraine

- Village
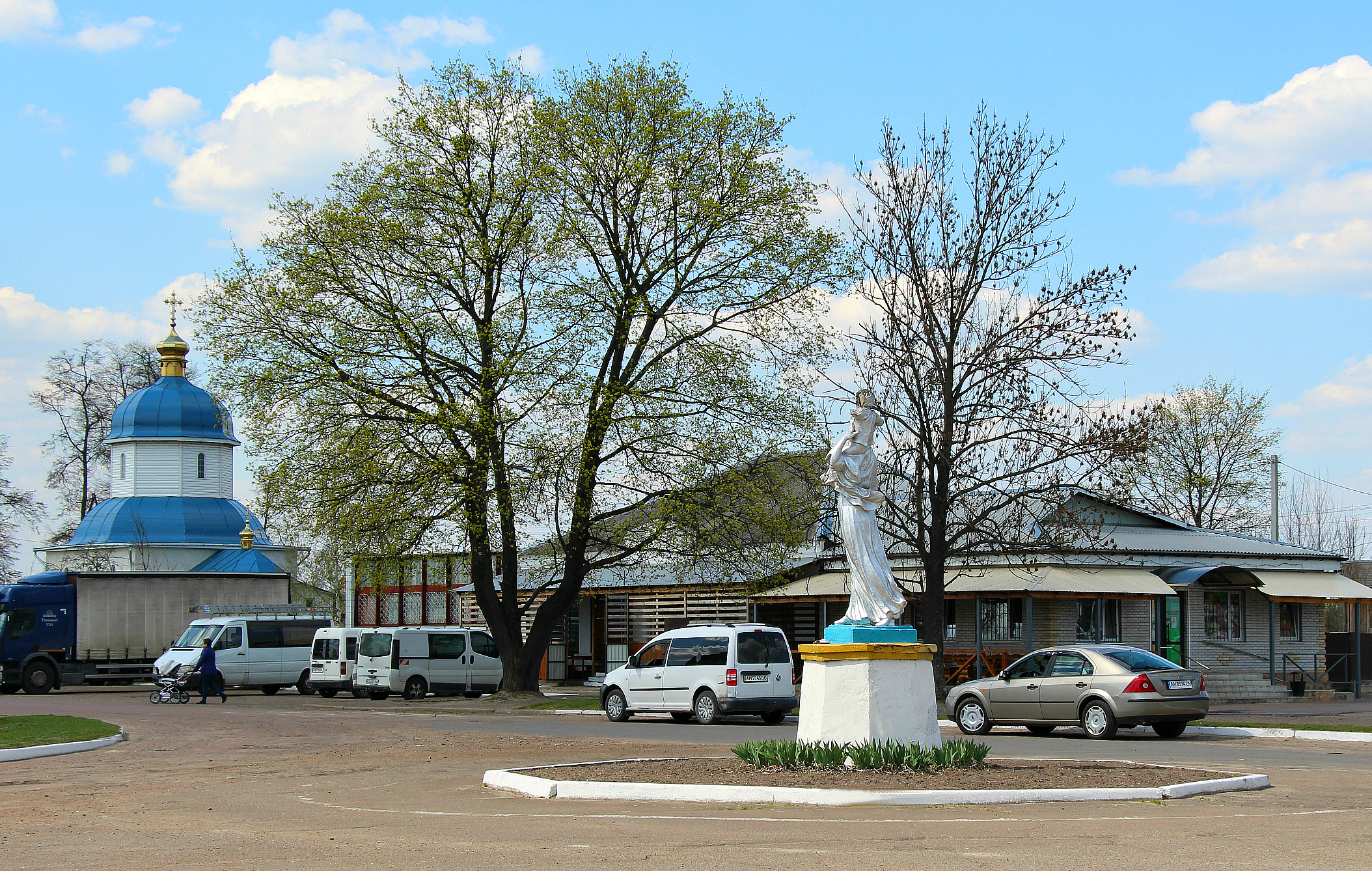

- Location within Ukraine
- Coordinates: 51°8′56″N 27°50′8″E
- Founded: 1496

Government
  - Type: Radovel Village Council

Area
  - Total: 3.81 km^{2} (1.47 sq mi)

Population (2019)
  - Total: 1,249
  - Density: 328/km^{2} (849/sq mi)
- Postal code: 11025
- Website: radowell.org.ua/en/

Radovel (Ukrainian: Ра́довель) is a village in Korosten Raion, Zhytomyr Oblast, Ukraine.

== Geography ==
Radovel is situated about 20 km away from Olevsk (a district centre), 165 km away from Zhytomyr (a regional centre) and 205 km away from Kyiv (the capital of Ukraine). The territory of the village is about 3,810 square km. The village is located in the Polissia lowland, 192m above sea level. The climate is moderate continental with cold winters and warm summers. The Polissia region is made up of mixed forests. Fauna and flora is typical for the Ukrainian Polissia region. «The soils are turf podzolic, composed of sand and drained clay, glial drained and loose-buckthorn. The amount of humus is about 1,9». The Perga river is located about 2 km from the village.

== History ==
The history of the village of Radovel has been preserved in essays, archival documents, eyewitness accounts, and books by the former teacher and headmaster of Radovel State Secondary School, a researcher in the history of her native land, Nina Veselska. Some of her works include The Corner of the Picturesque Polissya and Memory is Everpresently Alive: Essays from the History of the Village Radovel and its School.
The books state that archival documents contain no information on the exact origin of the name Radovel. According to oral history the name may come from the words "council" (ukr."рада") and "lead" (ukr."вести"): a prince in the region was advised where to lead his army or "very happy", "rejoiced" (ukr."радіти вельми"): the prince and his warriors found their way out of the swamps and came upon a convenient place to rest, and therefore rejoiced. There is also a legend about Radov, a daring man of the Drevlian tribe, in whose honor the village was allegedly named.
No specific date for the establishment of the village was found. However, in the Geographical Dictionary of the Kingdom of Poland and Other Slavic Territories, a former graduate of the Radovel School Nadiia Herhalo found the following information: "Village Radovel, Ovruch district, Zhubrovychi parish, 99 miles away from Ovruch, 142 houses, 849 inhabitants, a wooden church, built in 1862. In 1496, Radovel was given to Prince Tymofii Ivanovych Kapusta by King Alexander, in 1581 - to Bohdan Sapeha". Thus, in 1496, the village of Radovel already existed. Therefore, "the first mention of a village Radov in the Ukrainian archives, dated 1545, is not exact".
In the second half of the 17th century, Józef Karol Niemirycz gave Radovel a monastery of Carmelites in Olevsk. In 1694, Alexander Niemirycz became the owner of Radovel. In the 18th century, the village was part of the Volhynian Voivodeship and then that of the Volhynia province (1795), which became part of the Russian Empire and was the most backward margin of the South-Western region of Russia. In 1831 Radovel transformed into a state estate, under the category of state-owned villages. At that time, the village belonged to the Olevsk parish, though, in 1866, it was readministered to the Zhubrovychi and then to the Bilokorovychi parish.
Radovel saw such historical events as the Stolypin agrarian reform (in 1906, there were 1,000 people and 156 farms in the village), national liberation movement of 1917-1921, the Holodomor, Soviet rule, Chernobyl (the village was classified in the third category of those impacted by the disaster) and the restoration of Ukraine's independence. Today, the project "Radovel" is being implemented in the village.

Radovel was previously located in Olevsk Raion until was abolished on 18 July 2020 as part of the administrative reform of Ukraine, which reduced the number of raions of Zhytomyr Oblast to four. The area of Olevsk Raion was merged into Korosten Raion.

== Social sector ==
In the village there is a school, an "Ukrpost" post office, an outpatient department and pharmacy, a village club with a library and ethnographic museum, as well as a village council (which unites Radovel, Rudnia-Radovelska and Poiasky civil communities).

=== Education ===
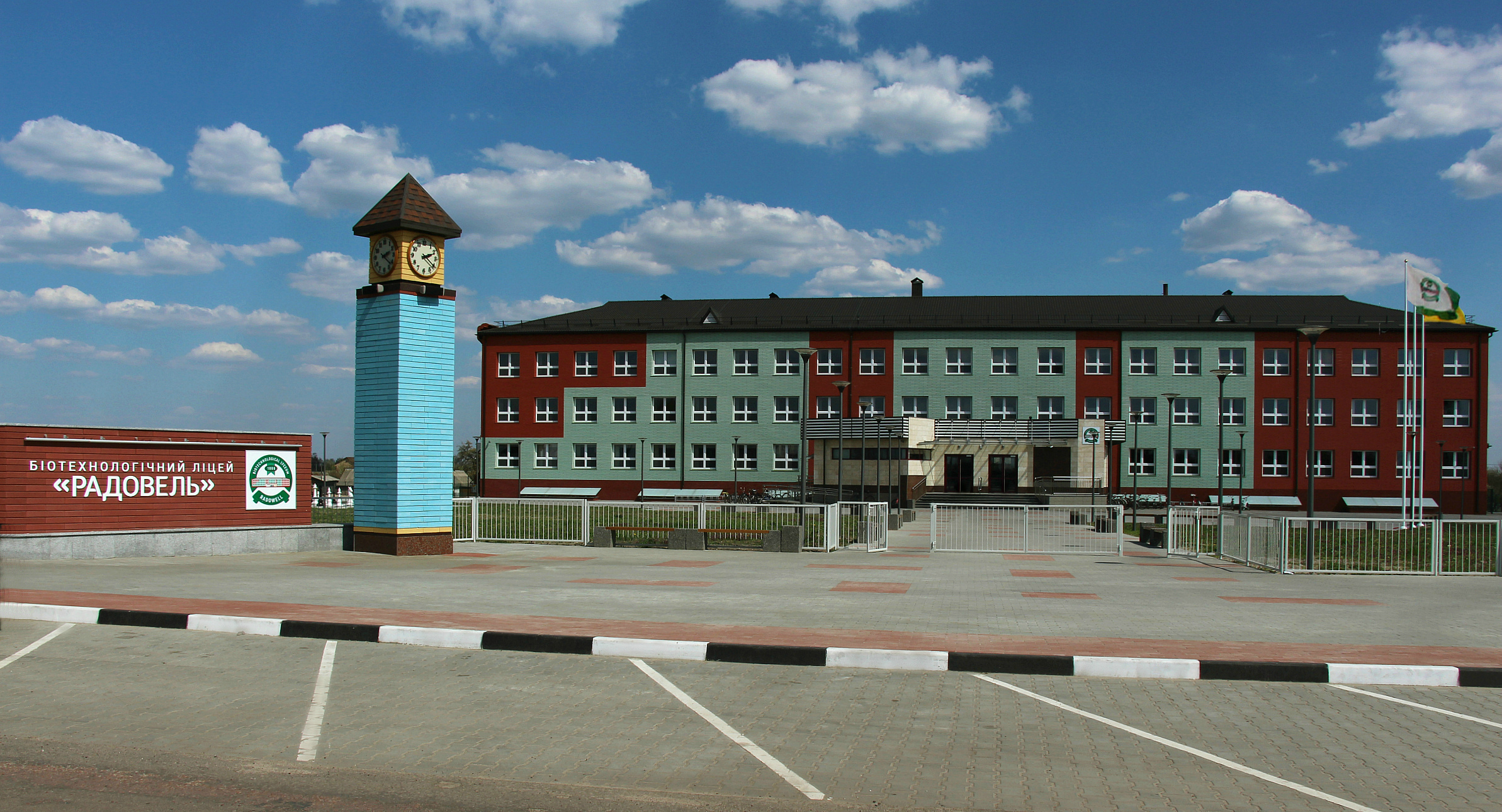
Biotechnological Lyceum "Radovel"

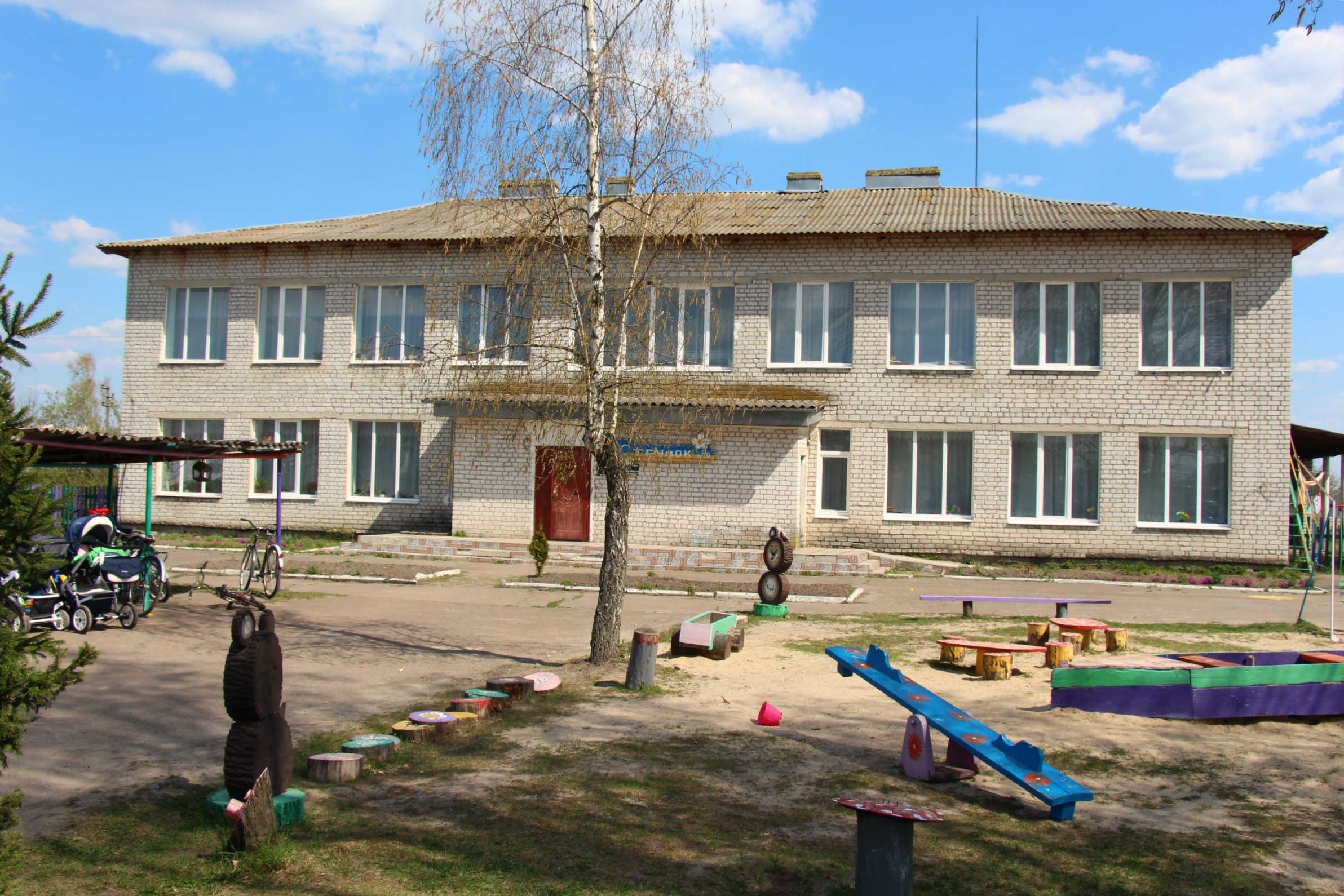
Kindergarten "Strumok" in the village Radovel

Biotechnological Lyceum "Radovel" was opened on September 15, 2018 in the village of Radovel. It was reorganized from the Radovel Secondary School I-III ranking. The institution is adapted to children with special needs. It has a modern design and innovative equipment consisting of more than 10 studios, including robotics, taekwon-do, pottery, drama club, culinary studio, and choreography. As of February 2019, 330 students study at the Lyceum.

Preschool education is represented by the kindergarten No. 20. There are three groups in "Strumok" (nursery, middle and junior), the language of education is Ukrainian. The facility is designed to accommodate up to 90 students.

=== Health Care ===
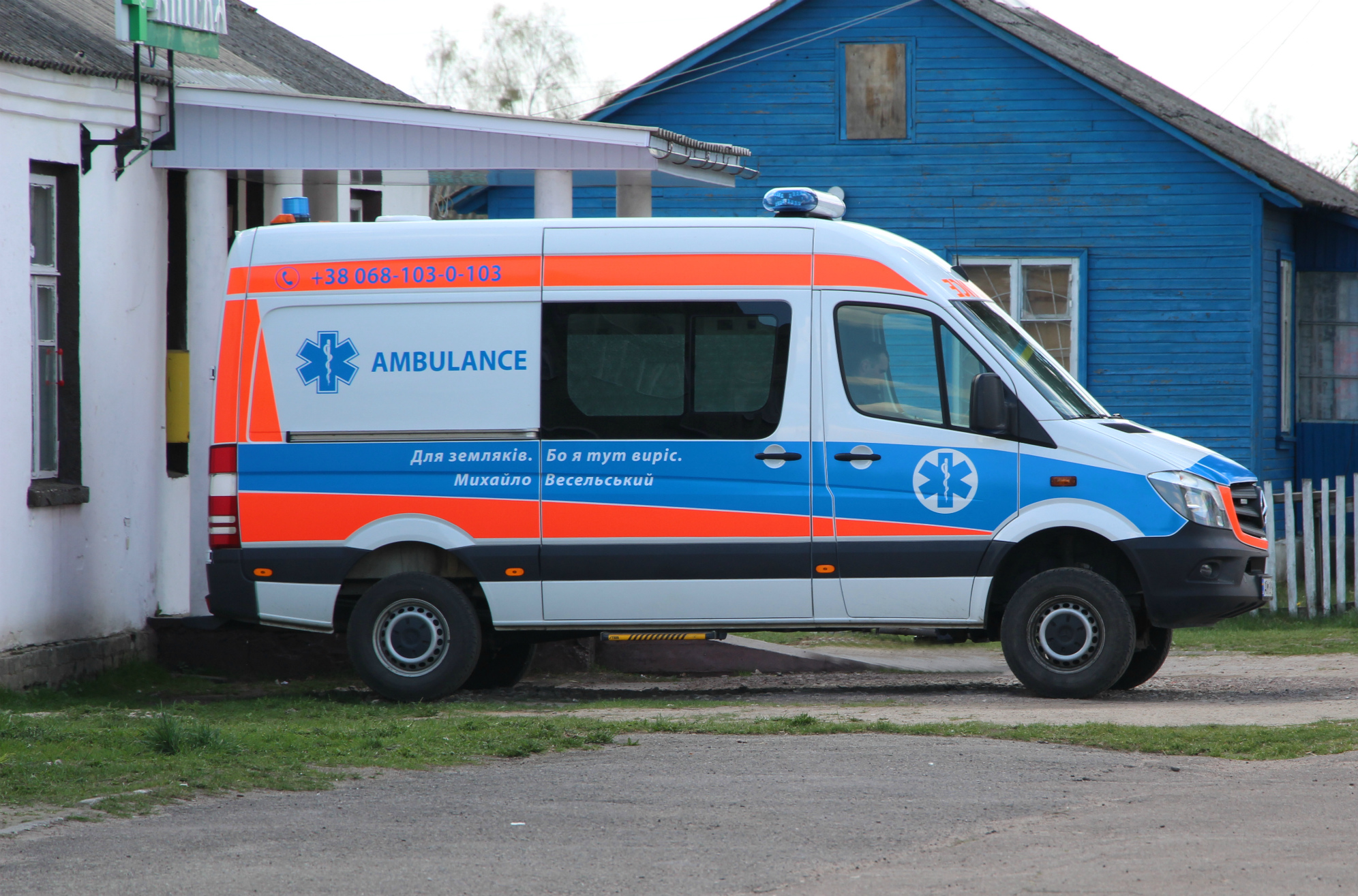
Ambulance car

At present in the village there is a pharmacy, a temporary outpatient clinic, as well as an emergency first aid facility — a modern reanimobile with innovative equipment. The old outpatient clinic was dismantled on December 8, and the construction of the new one began on December 24. The ongoing construction of the outpatient clinic is a part of the "Radovel" project.

=== Culture ===
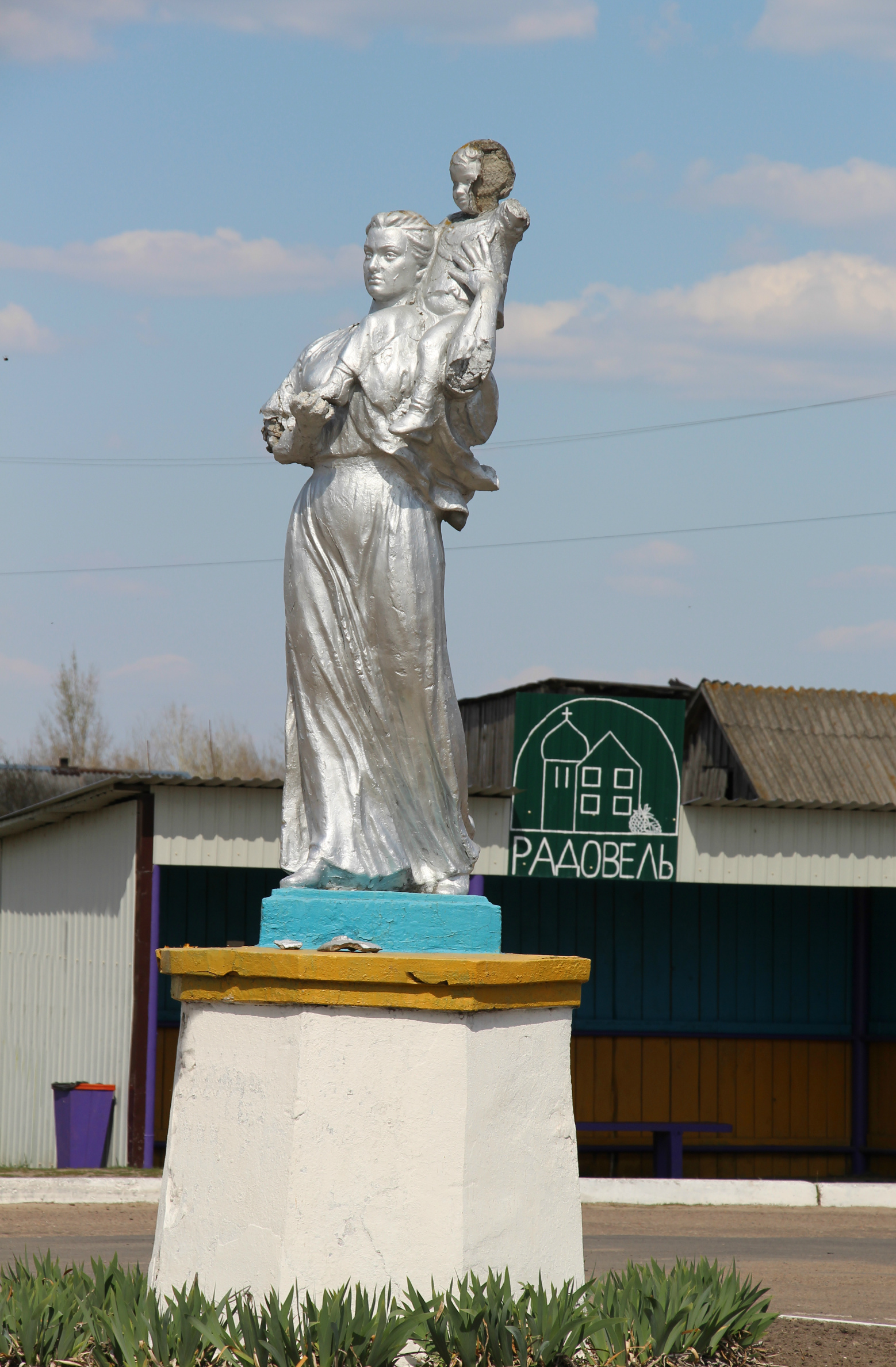
The statue of a mother and child

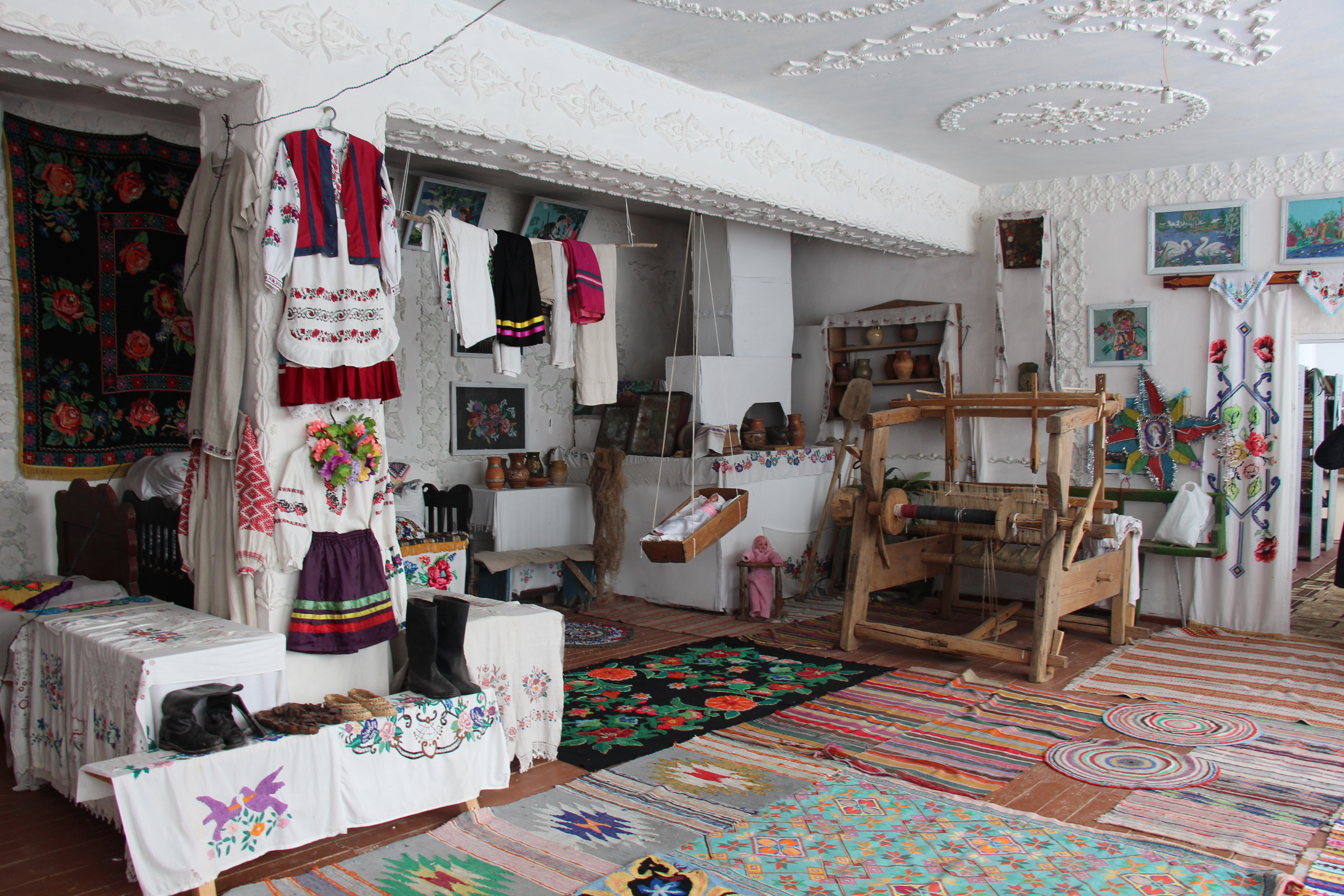
Narodoznavcha svitlytsia. Museum

The present-day village club has been in operation since 1981. All year around it hosts various cultural events dedicated to holidays and other important celebrations. Since 1995, there has been an amateur ensemble folk dance "Rado", which is a regular participant of amateur concerts and district festivals. In 2014, the singing band "Svitanok" was founded.
The club has a village library and a local museum — Narodoznavcha svitlytsia, where artifacts of national importance are collected. Among the exhibits there are embroidered towels, spinning wheels, a workbench for the production of textiles, a variety of vintage products and zhen (a leather rope used for wild beekeeping). Some locals still collect wild honey.
Among cultural memorials in the village, there is a statue of a mother and child, located in the center. It is sculpted by M.M. Barynova, a graduate of Radovel Secondary School. There is also a memorial in honor of S.K. Tur, a commander of a partisan group, and other fellow villagers who had participated in World War II.
On February 25, 2016, a new church was opened. It was funded by the local community and other sponsors. Initially, the church was built in 1862 with state funds, and at that time was named in honor of the Resurrection of Christ. In the second half of the 20th century, the church was burned down.

== Transport ==
Every day, buses run through the village following Olevsk-Kyiv/ Kyiv-Olevsk and Olevsk-Zhytomyr/ Zhytomyr-Olevsk routes. Within 5 km from Radovel, there is an international highway M-07, Kyiv-Kovel-Yahodyn. The nearest railway stations are Poiasky, Olevsk, Bilokorovychi and Korosten.

== Population ==
As of January, 01, 2019, the population constitutes 1249 inhabitants

=== Notable people ===
- Mykola Khorechko, senior soldier of the Armed Forces, died in the battles of Debaltseve.
- Yaroshenko Serhii Hryhorovych, sergeant, fighter of the 30th separate mechanized brigade in the 8th Army Corps of the Ground Forces of the Armed Forces of Ukraine; died during an anti-terrorist operation in eastern Ukraine.
- Ivan Kruchko, junior sergeant, commander of a motorized infantry division. Born and buried in Radovel. Died in Afghanistan in the age of 19 years.
- Yakiv Kravchenko, liquidator of the meltdown at the Chernobyl Nuclear Power Plant.
- Volodymyr Pavlenko, liquidator of the meltdown at the Chernobyl Nuclear Power Plant.
- Nina Veselska, former director of Radovel State Secondary School, member of the National Union of Ukrainian Regional Ethnographers, Head of the Veteran's Council, honorary veteran of the Hero City of Kyiv, author of literary and artistic, historical and documentary, ethnographic editions and honorary citizen of the village of Radovel.
- Olha Hlotko-Pylypchuk, former nurse of the village of Rudnia-Radovelska and that of Radovel as well as the city of Olevsk, poet, author of more than 30 books; member of the National Union of Journalists of Ukraine, the Union of Writers "Slavutych" (Kremenchuk), Poltava Union of Writers; honorary citizen of the city of Olevsk; laureate of the International Literary Prize named after Panteleimon Kulish and All-Ukrainian Prize named after Vasyl Yukhymovych — for the book Blue-Eyed Polissia.
- Mariya Khlan, native and resident of the village of Radovel, author of the collections Pearl of the Soul and On the Wings of the Spirit. She devoted many years of her life to the gathering of oral folk art and recorded dozens of folk songs of the Polissia region.
- Liudmyla Saiko, Ukrainian Soviet activist, teacher of Radovel State Secondary School and the Biotechnological Lyceum "Radovel", member of the Verkhovna Rada of the USSR of the 10th-11th convocations.
- Mykhaylo Veselskyy, native of the village of Radovel, entrepreneur, initiator and patron of the project "Radovel".

== The "Radovel" Project ==
The main purpose of the "Radovel" project, initiated and funded by village native, Mykhaylo Veselskyy, is to create necessary preconditions and conditions for comfortable living in the village. Inner-projects that aim to achieve the stated goal are the following:

- Creation of educational space (for children, teachers, adults and community): Biotechnological Lyceum "Radovel", construction of a kindergarten, houses of future scientists, research laboratories, handicraft and creative workrooms
- Organization of modern and effective medical support (with contemporary medical facilities as well as teams of specialists)
- Organization of local business (growing berry crops on an industrial scale, beekeeping, growing cucumbers/ tomatoes in greenhouses, construction of production facilities)
- Construction of modern housing for the specialists involved (construction of temporary housing and cottages for permanent residents, which under certain conditions can be transferred to private ownership)
- Development of infrastructure projects (gasification of the village, centralized water supply to each house, drainage and sewage treatment, waste collection, establishment of a center for forest restoration)
- Communication project (local multimedia newsroom "Radovel")
- Creation of a public space (culture, life, sports, entertainment)
- Creation of a nursing home
- Reorganization of local authorities.
