= Kyiv Secondary School No. 189 =

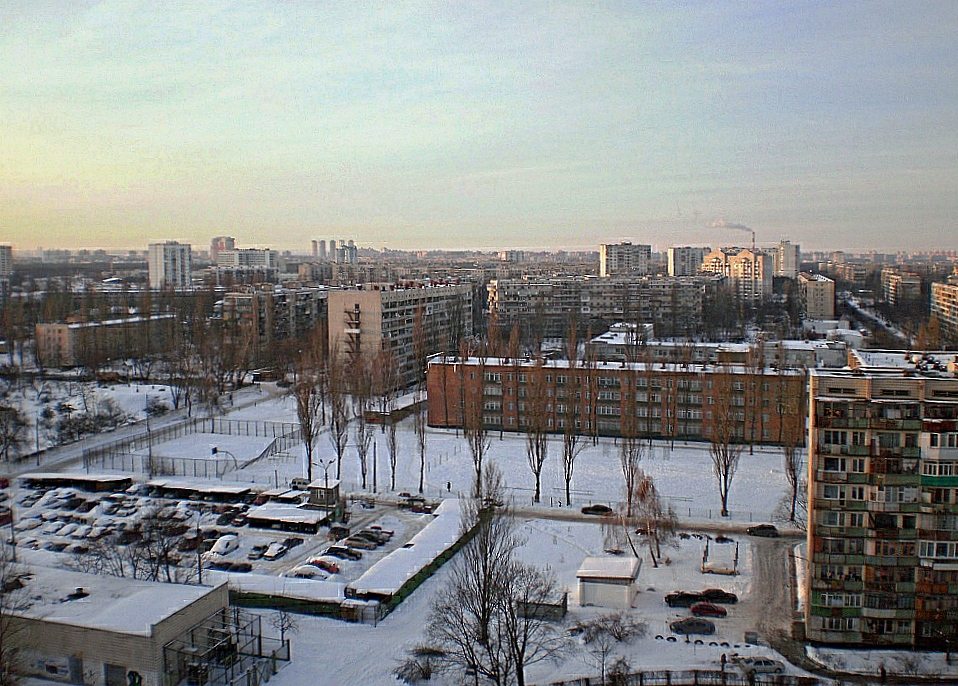

Location
- 5 Milyutenko Street; Desnianskyi District, Kyiv, 02156; Ukraine
- Coordinates: 50°27′59.37″N 30°38′1.74″E

Information
- Type: Comprehensive school, Public, Specialized school
- Established: September 1, 1967
- Principal: Olenych Tetyana Olexandrivna
- Teaching staff: 15
- Grades: 1–11
- Enrollment: ~1200
- Website: school189-kiev.narod.ru

The 189th Secondary School or officially Comprehensive Secondary School No.189 with deep learning of English and German from the first grade of Desna raion of Kyiv municipality (Ukrainian: Середня загальноосвітня школа І-ІІІ ступенів №189 з поглибленим вивченням англійської та німецької мов з першого класу Деснянського району м. Києва) is an ordinary public school which provides compulsory and specialized education.

== History ==
The school was opened in 1967. It was the first secondary school in the Lisovyi masyv – microdistrict of the Desnianskyi District of Kyiv. During this time, the school established certain traditions that teaching staff and keep multiplying, namely:

- training and education of students - these are two inseparable processes;
- transfer of knowledge through the formation of interest in the subject development and curiosity of students.

In 1987 the institution received the status of 'Schools with advanced studies of English and German from first grade. There are 1084 students now enrolled in 40 classes. In these advanced courses of English and German in 24 classes. The school is equipped with 12 foreign language classrooms, 2 computer classes. School pupils are actively involved in the district, city competitions and sections of the Small Academy of Science of Ukraine. They are often taken prizes and awarded diplomas.

== Teachers ==
- Antonenko Inna Semenivna
- Atamanchuk Irina Mihailivna
- Bura Galina Terentiivna
- Gudsenko Valentina Ivanivna
- Ignatov Olexandr Volodimirovich
- Kabaluk Irina Igorivna
- Klimenchuk Nadiya Grigirivna
- Kravchuk Valentina Volodimirivna
- Matvienko Mykola Mykolayovich
- Ostrova Zinaida Romanivna
- Pergamenshik Mihail Semenovich
- Sagan Trohim Trohimovich
- Shum Regina Yosipivna
- Shvaykivska Tamara Petrivna
- Trusova Ludmila Olexandrivna

== See also ==
Kyiv Natural Science Lyceum No. 145

Kyiv Specialized School No. 159

Ukrainian Physics and Mathematics Lyceum
