= Ukrainian medical Lyceum =

Ukrainian Medical Lyceum at O.O. Bogomolets National medical university
- Kyiv; Ukraine

Information
- Type: lyceum
- Established: 1991
- Website: http://uml.nmu.edu.ua//

Ukrainian Medical Lyceum at Bogomolets National Medical University (UML NMU) is a secondary school in Kyiv, Ukraine, with the goal to prepare students for medical (pharmaceutical) school, primarily at the school's associated medical university. Students are also prepared for work as junior medical staff in the health care field.

== From history of Lyceum’s establishment ==
Bogomolets NMU opened medical classes for the first time at the end of the Soviet Union in what would be independent Ukraine on 18, April, 1990 at the initiative of Goncharuk Yevgen Gnatovych; these classes in 1991 acquired the status of state medical lyceums on the base of Lesia Ukrainka Classical Gymnasium No 117 (director – L.M. Boyko) and natural lyceum No 157 (director – V.I. Kostenko), which became the necessary component in construction of system for continuous medical education.

The uniform Ukrainian medical lyceum started by O.O. Bogomolets National medical university and Starokyivska (now Shevchenkivska) district state administration in c. Kyiv, established on 11, June, 1997 with assistance from the Ministry of education and science of Ukraine, the Ministry of Health care of Ukraine, and the Kyiv city state administration.

The Guardian Council of Lyceum by 2014 was headed by Ivan Plyushch.

== Admissions ==
Pupils from all regions of Ukraine, Commonwealth of Independent States, and foreign citizens (according to existing legislation of Ukraine) who have graduated from 8-9th classes at general education school and passed through competitive selection, are enrolled in the lyceum. The competitive selection is carried out according to complex occupational tests (Ukrainian language and literature, biology) by the Admission Commission at O.O. Bogomolets National Medical University. The study period at Lyceum is three years for students who enter after the eighth grade and two years for students who enter after the ninth grade.

== Achievements ==
Today Lyceum is a skilled scientific pedagogical collective that unites seven departments at O.O. Bogomolets National medical university (medical and biological physics, biology, bioorganic, biological and pharmaceutical chemistry, medical and general chemistry, foreign language, Latin language, propaedeutics of internal medicine No 1), medical gymnasium No 33 in c. Kyiv. Lyceum teaches pursuant to state programs and has over 20 integrated author's programs.

The educational process is provided by over 90 teachers, among them 67 teachers of the University (8 professors, 45 assistant professors and senior teachers, the rest of them are candidates of sciences) and 23 teachers-Methodists. Among them, there are 5 academicians and corresponding members of NAS, NAMS, NAPS of Ukraine, 10 Honorary scientists and technicians of Ukraine, Honorary doctors of Ukraine, Honorary educationalists of Ukraine, 4 laureates of State prize in the sphere of science and technology in Ukraine.

Scientific pedagogical schools of all-Ukrainian and European level were established and work at lyceum. Special and elective courses: Medical psychology, Basics of business ethics and medical deontology, History of medicine, Vocational-oriented education of pupils to medical specialties, Bioethics, Latin and Old Greek language, Chinese language, Ecology, Basics of health and future professional medical activity.

During its existence Lyceum educated over 2,500 pupils, among them over 100 foreign citizens. Each tenth graduate from O.O. Bogomolets National medical university is a graduate from Lyceum. Among them 50 graduates from Lyceum are included into Golden honorary book of University, 360 persons defended Master's, Candidate's and Doctor's dissertations in Ukraine, 45 graduates defended Master's and Doctor's dissertations (PhD, MD) in leading countries over the world. Pre-professional training is carried out on the base of the best clinical and medical preventive health care establishments in city Kyiv. Graduates from lyceum are awarded with qualification “Junior hospital nurse on care for patients” and received Certificates of established form. For the first time among medical schools in Ukraine lyceum was awarded with the Great Silver Medal from International Pedagogical Academy (Russia, c. Moscow, 2000) for achievements in the sphere of education, culture and science. The educational establishment was awarded with the Honorary diploma from Verkhovna Rada of Ukraine, Cabinet of Ministers of Ukraine, Ministry of health care of Ukraine, Honorary Diploma from Ministry of education and science, youth and sport of Ukraine, Kyiv city state administration. Lyceum was awarded with 20 Golden medal of International educational exhibitions and contests, according to National rating of Ukraine it was acknowledged as “Flagman of science and education” (2008), Honorary title “Leader in modern education” (2009). Winners in all-Ukrainian Olympiads and contests, famous sportsmen, champions of Ukraine and Europe studied and continue studying at lyceum. The confirmation for high level of quality in study at lyceum is the results from External independent assessment of quality in education. Among graduates from Lyceum (2008–2012) 19 persons received per 200 scores in Ukrainian language and literature, biology, chemistry, physics. Lyceum has its own press organ – “Herald of Ukrainian medical lyceum at O.O. Bogomolets National medical university”.

== Administration ==
Deputy directors
Ivanenko Ruslana Valeriyivna – Candidate of Pedagogy, assistant professor, Outstanding worker of Ukraine, Laureate of P. Kulish and A.P. Romodanov prizes, awarded with Honorary diploma from Chairman of KCSA, Honorary diploma from MHC of Ukraine
Pereymybida Larysa Valentynivna – Candidate of Pedagogy, assistant professor, Outstanding worker of Ukraine, Laureate of P. Kulish and A.P. Romodanov prizes, awarded with Honorary diploma from Chairman of KCSA, Honorary diploma from MHC of Ukraine

== Scientific activity ==
UML is a member of the Junior Academy of Sciences of Ukraine since 1997. A.P. Romodanov scientific society of Lyceum pupils for the first time among general education establishment in 2001 was awarded with the highest decoration “Golden Owl” from Presidium in Junior Academy of Sciences of Ukraine, which was presented at the General meeting of the academy by Borys Paton. Since 2000, UML has kept the first place among general education establishments in city Kyiv due to results from scientific contests-presentations at Minor Academy of Sciences of Ukraine. Lyceum is the Absolute winner in the All-Ukrainian contest of scientific research works by students in MAS among 9-11th grades in Kyiv. UML was announced as the leader in implementation of new forms for organization of scientific research work among 9-11th classes from the high tribune of Presidium of Academy of sciences of Ukraine. Every year graduates from the lyceum become winners in III stage of all-Ukrainian contest-presentation of scientific research works by students in Junior Academy of Sciences of Ukraine of Ukraine and IV stage of All-Ukrainian Student Olympiads.

== International activity ==
Ukrainian Medical Lyceum is a member in foundation of UNESCO associated schools (2000). UML has international educational and scientific contacts, anticipated by bilateral agreements with over 30 foreign educational establishments in Europe and the US. The lyceum is a partner of the Institute of Biophysics at RAS and the experimental school-laboratory at APS of Russia (Russia, c. Puschyno, 1997), concluded agreements about cooperation with the department of Biophysics at M.M. Lomonosov Moscow state university, P. Kulish gymnasium (c. Borzna, Chernihiv region)

== Clinical bases of lyceum ==
- A.P. Romodanov Institute of neurosurgery at NAMS of Ukraine
- Kyiv city clinical oncological center
- Institute of cancer
- Institute of endocrinology and metabolism at NAMS of Ukraine
- Center of polytrauma, thoracal center (KCCH No 17)
- R.Ye. Kavetskyy Institute of experimental pathology, oncology and radiobiology at NAS of Ukraine
- Institute of pediatrics, obstetrics and gynecology at NAS of Ukraine
- Center of pediatric surgery, microsurgery, toxicology and methods of efferent therapy, medical psychological (Okhmatdyt)
- Central clinical hospital of State border guard service of Ukraine (department of propaedeutics of internal medicine No 1 at O.O. Bogomolets NMU)
- Kyiv city clinical hospital No 18 (department of pathomorphology at O.O. Bogomolets NMU)
- Kyiv city psychiatric hospital, named after Pavlov
- Oleksandrivska hospital
