= Biotechnological Lyceum "Radovel" =

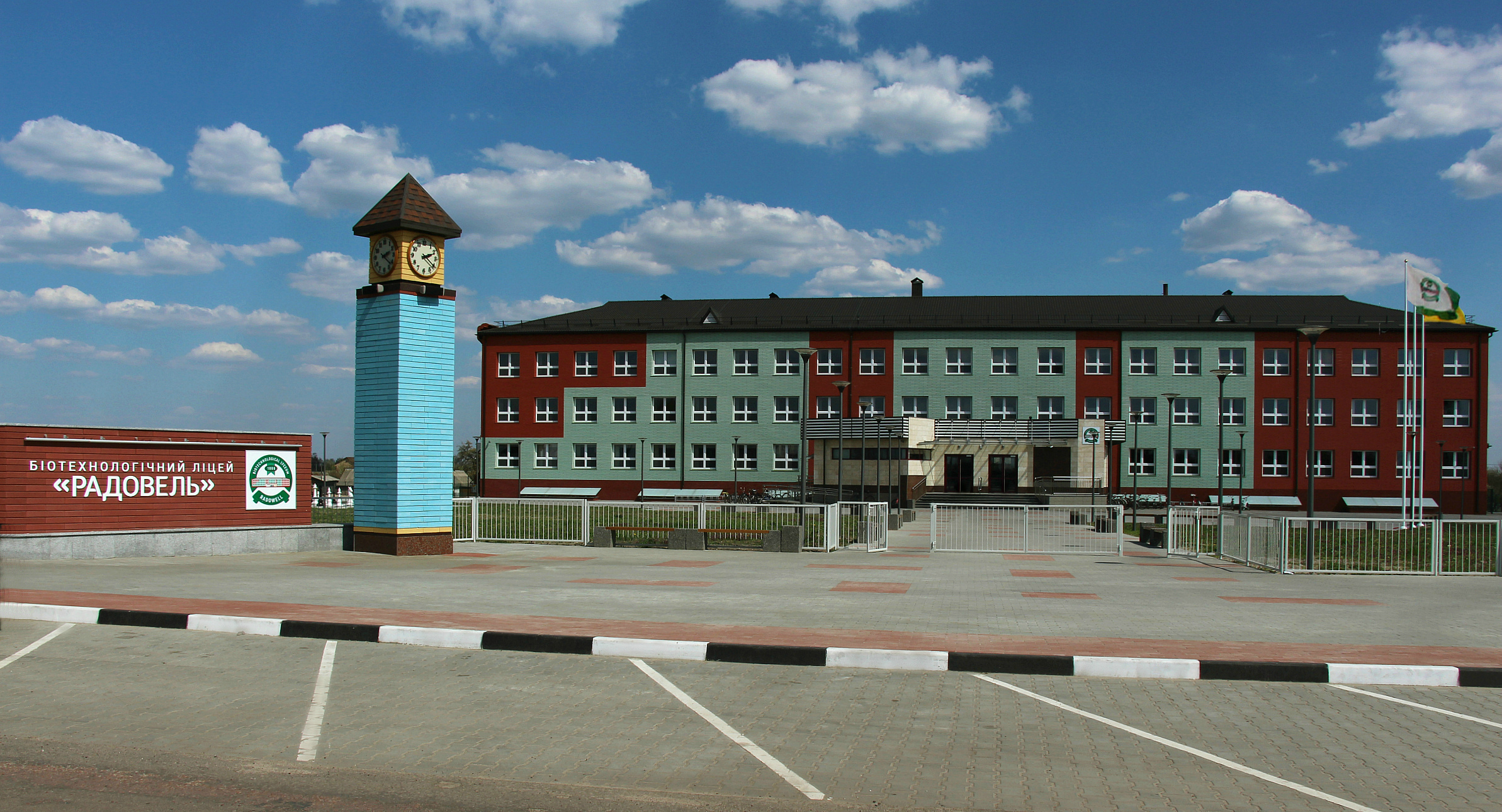

Location
- 11025, Kyivska st., 5, Zhytomyr region, Olevsk district, the village of Radovel; Ukraine; 51°8′59″N 27°50′31″E

Information
- Type: Lyceum
- Opened: September 15, 2018
- Website: https://radowell-lyceum.org.ua/en/

Foundational Educational Institution Biotechnological Lyceum "Radovel" is a State secondary school in the village Radovel, Olevsk Raion, Zhytomyr Oblast. A state of the art educational space, fully adapted for the development of children, including those with special educational needs. It is a safe educational environment, where child development is organically linked to real-world application. The mission of the Lyceum is: “We are developing together: parents - children - teachers - community!"

== History ==
The history of Radovel State Secondary School has been preserved in books by the former teacher and headmaster of Radovel State Secondary School, a researcher in the history of her native land, Nina Veselska, The Corner of the Picturesque Polissya and Memory is Everpresently Alive: Essays from the History of the Village Radovel and its School.

Until recently, it was thought that the first mention of the school dated back to 1899. It was evidenced by the handwritten document "Case No. 8604", which is stored in the Central State Historical Archives of Ukraine (Kyiv), and by the handbook "School of the Kiev Educational District", which is preserved in the National Library named after V. I. Vernadskyi, in the department of the historical works. The latter contains a list of teachers from the Ovruch district for the year 1908, among which there is mention of a Radovel Church Parish School teacher.

However, in 2018, the Lyceum requested documents from the Zhytomyr State Regional Archives which could provide an earlier mention of the school’s existence. Upon the request, the following two official documents were received: "The Judgment of Radovel and Zhubrovychi Rural Communities" and "Report on the State Church Parish School of the 4th Deanery district in the Ovruch county, the first-world section of the Zhubrovychi volost in the village of Radovel for 1897-1898", which revealed the actual date of the school's opening — October 6, 1886.

The first Radovel school was a church parish institution. It had one classroom with a three-year term of study. There was no separate school building. The children studied in 2-3 ordinary rural huts. In 1920, the Radovel three-year school system was reorganized into a four-year system. As of December 15, 1927, there were 64 students taught by one teacher in Radovel.

In 1935-1936, under the directorship of Stanislav Dembytskyi, the first wooden two-story school building was built and operated in the village of Radovel. At that time, new young specialists joined the teaching staff. In 1937, the school received the status of a seven-year school, and a year later, that of a secondary school. In June 1941, the first graduation of the 10th grade students (16 graduates) was held, and in July, the school was forcibly shut down because of the war.

The school building survived and on January 1, 1944 the institution resumed its normal function. Despite the fact that in the post-war years the financial situation of the school and students was extremely dire, the Radovel school kept working, and specialists arrived in the village, including teachers. In the photo of the teaching staff of 1952, in the book Memory is Eternally Alive: Essays from History of the Village Radovel and its School by Nina Veselska, there are 20 teachers. The first post-war graduation took place in 1954, and 28 students received diplomas. At that time, those who graduated from the 7th grade were enrolled in university based on their Math and Ukrainian language exam results. Their studies were self-funded, however this practice was abolished in 1957. It is noteworthy that for more than 10 years, most of the seniors of Radovel, coming from neighboring villages, stayed in boarding schools or lived with their relatives. The boarding school shut down in 1987, when it was no longer necessary for students to come to Radovel from other villages.

In 1962, the school building was renovated. In the 1961-1962 academic year, there was no 10th grade graduation, as children continued their studies into 11th grade. It is interesting that in 1965-1966 three classes graduated at once, namely two 10th grade classes and one 11th. For the following 24 years, no more students graduated from the 11th grade. In the 1960s and 1970s, work at the school was organized into two shifts (morning and evening classes for different students). The number of students in the 1970s exceeded 700 people. Some integral parts of school life were the sanitary and football teams, numerous excursions, hiking trips, student government, an amateur art school and educational research at the highest level. The school had 2.5 acres of land, of which 0.6 acres were designated for agricultural purposes, where different types of vegetables, typical of the Polissia region, were grown. The remaining 1.9 acres were used as an orchard. The flax seed from this land was exhibited at the All-Ukrainian Agricultural Exhibition in Kyiv. Radovel kept in touch with the Zhytomyr regional center of youth and the Zhytomyr Agricultural Institute’s scientific department, both of which provided the school with new potato varieties for several years. In the 1960s and 1970s, the school had its own truck, tractor and a pair of horses. High school students were taught driving and mechanics and received appropriate certificates for both. Active students of the school took part in social initiatives (production of birdhouses for Radovel Forestry, collecting metal scrap, paper waste and ash). In the village council, the school had its own student account, which held student-earned money used for various school activities.

In 1983, as the school worked in two shifts, did not have a water supply and was heated by a furnace system, a new three-story school was built with a capacity for 625 students. The principal of the school at that time was N.M. Veselska. The process of learning in two shifts ended and all classes were transferred to the cabinet system. The school had a spacious dining room, locker room, a greenhouse, an industrial training workshop, sports and assembly halls and a military shooting gallery. Through the effort of the pedagogical team (L.M. Saiko, K.M. Drobot, V.I. Nevmerzhytska, T.U. Kravchenko and others) all the study rooms and the school library were equipped with necessary learning material, and a small museum of labor and military glory was created. The school dining room provided the students with free breakfasts and lunches. Internal lavatories, treatment facilities, a boiler room, a water tower, a greenhouse were in operation.

During the 90s and 2000s, the school facilities were improved. In November 2001, Radovel Secondary School was the first among rural schools in the district to open a computer lab, which was funded by one of its graduates of the year 1986, Mykhaylo Veselskyy. At the same time, the number of students decreased. While in 1985-1986, 326 students studied in Radovel Secondary School, in 2008-2009, the number of students decreased to 188. As for the teaching staff, over 260 teachers worked at Radovel, around 70 of which were graduates of the school. Some teachers worked at the school for a few years, and some made teaching at Radovel a lifelong profession.

On May 8, 2018, the Olevsk Regional Council reorganized the school into the Biotechnological Lyceum "Radovel". On September 15, the new school was officially opened. On October 5, a teacher portrait gallery was opened to honor and memorialize those who taught throughout the history of Radovel. The creator of the gallery is Nina Veselska.

== Modernity. The Concept of Lyceum ==
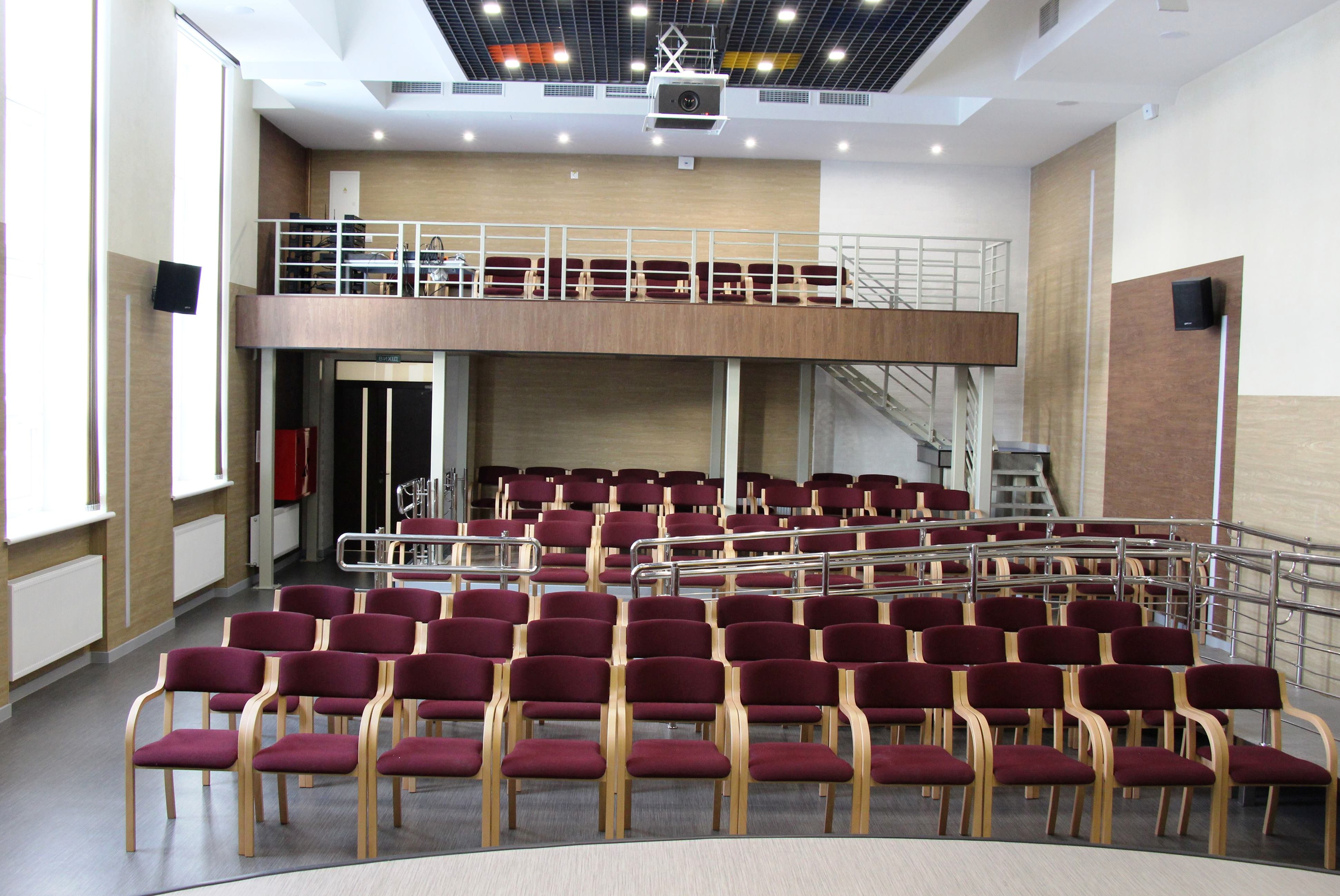
The Drama Club hall

Within the years August 2017 to September 2018, a team managed to reconstruct the building of the educational institution in accordance with the concept of the “Radowell” Lyceum. The “Radowell” project was initiated by philanthropist Mykhaylo Veselskyy, who was born in Radowell and graduated from the school. The concept was formed with the joint effort of Irina Chudovska and Olexandr Horodnychyi, later joined by an architect who designed the lyceum. “There were 28 variants of the functional plan of the school, but while building, I made some changes”. The basis of the conception of “Radowell” is forming strong character traits based on spiritual values. Lyceum has created preconditions for:

- Acquiring academic knowledge
- Physical development
- Development of creativity

The design of the Lyceum was developed in accordance with the core values stated above. All necessary conditions for the development of children have been created. The classrooms are supplied with technical and technological equipment, including interactive panels of the new generation "EdPro" with the exclusive educational platform MozaBook, that allows teachers and students to perform interactive tasks with game elements, study educational content, get acquainted with thematic 3-D models, conduct experiments, etc.

There are more than 10 studios and workshops at the Lyceum. The Culinary Studio, Studio of Design and Sewing, Robotics Studio, Art Studio and Ceramic Studio, Wood and Metal Workshops, Drama Club, Dance Studio, Taekwon-Do and Gymnastics Halls are full of modern furniture, bright design and functional equipment. The outdoor sports grounds are still in the process of being built. On May 25, 2019, the football pitch with artificial turf according to international standards was officially opened.

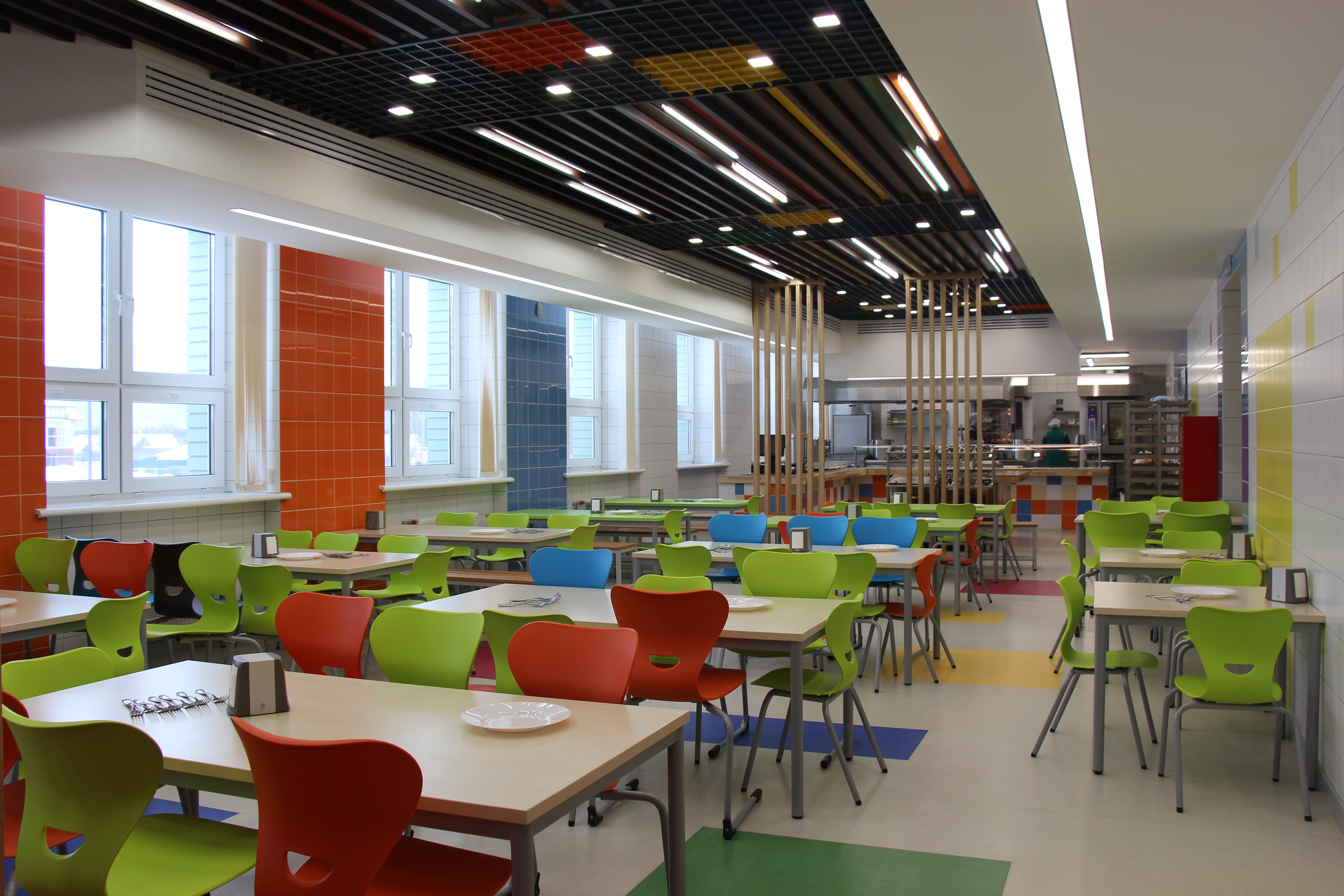
School dining room

“Radowell” is committed to providing a safe educational environment for each student, without any manifestations of violence, psychological discomfort, violation of rights and norms, physical and social security. Experienced psychologists work on issues of safe interaction between all students and adults. In addition, comfortable sanitary and hygienic conditions are present. There are high-quality healthy meal plans in accordance with modern dining standards. The Lyceum introduces new recipes from the handbook for school dining rooms by Yevhen Klopotenko.

As a result, the Biotechnological Lyceum “Radovel” is an up-to-date, new educational space, designed for the comprehensive development of students. It is a safe educational environment with many positive reviews from current media. In these reviews, the Lyceum has been called the “spaceship” and the dining room has been referred to as a real “restaurant”.

== Educational Approach ==
The educational process at BTL “Radovel” is driven by the basic principles, based on the following types of intelligence, held by both children and adults:

- IQ – problem solving and the development of critical thinking
- EQ – implementation of creative thinking as well as art in the educational process that allows for emotional intelligence
- Spatial intelligence – emphasis on physical education, the development of movement, space orientation, rhythms and choreographic skills
- Linguistic intelligence – actualization of the effective methods for studying foreign languages
- Mathematical intelligence – the development of logical thinking and mathematical imagination
- Musical intelligence – playing musical instruments, singing
- Social intelligence – appropriate trainings, master classes and workshops that allow students to work in teams and interact with social organizations and institutions

== Uniqueness ==
The school week in BTL "Radowell" begins with The Meeting Day — a morning Monday tea — for which children themselves bake biscuits in the Culinary Studio. The purpose of tea drinking is to energize students for the whole week, promote understanding and build trustworthy relationships among children, as well as between children and teachers. Other initiatives include:

- Cinema Day (cartoons and films are offered not only for lyceum students, but also for their parents to watch)
- Project Day (as a rule, jointly developed projects of teachers and students deal with biotechnology, educational disciplines, community development)
- Parents' Day when parents can attend classes with their children, gather parental councils to resolve urgent issues, etc.
- Leadership Day on which the Lyceum students assist teachers to conduct lessons, and class leaders have their parliamentary sessions.

The core principles of child development in the Lyceum are relationship equality, innovation, openness, integration (interdisciplinary and that of knowledge and skills with real world application) and initiative. In the creation of necessary preconditions for child development in the Lyceum, extra effort is given to foster teachers’ professional growth, parents’ development and community progress. Active cooperation among teachers, parents and children is strongly encouraged.

== Symbolics of the Lyceum ==
The Biotechnological Lyceum "Radovel" has a flag and coat of arms. The latter consists of a graphic representation of the Lyceum building and the logo in the form of the original title. The Lyceum also has a school uniform. Students of the Lyceum participated in designing the uniform, which consists of polos, sports pants, hoodies and baseball caps, with the name of the institution affixed to each article of clothing. There are 2 types of uniforms, namely "festive" and "causal". The holiday uniform is white (a polo and a baseball cap). The casual uniform has three colors (depending on the class): the elementary school is green, secondary school is blue, and high school is burgundy. The teaching staff, the Lyceum administration and other personnel also work in uniform (dark blue, green and white).

== Gallery ==
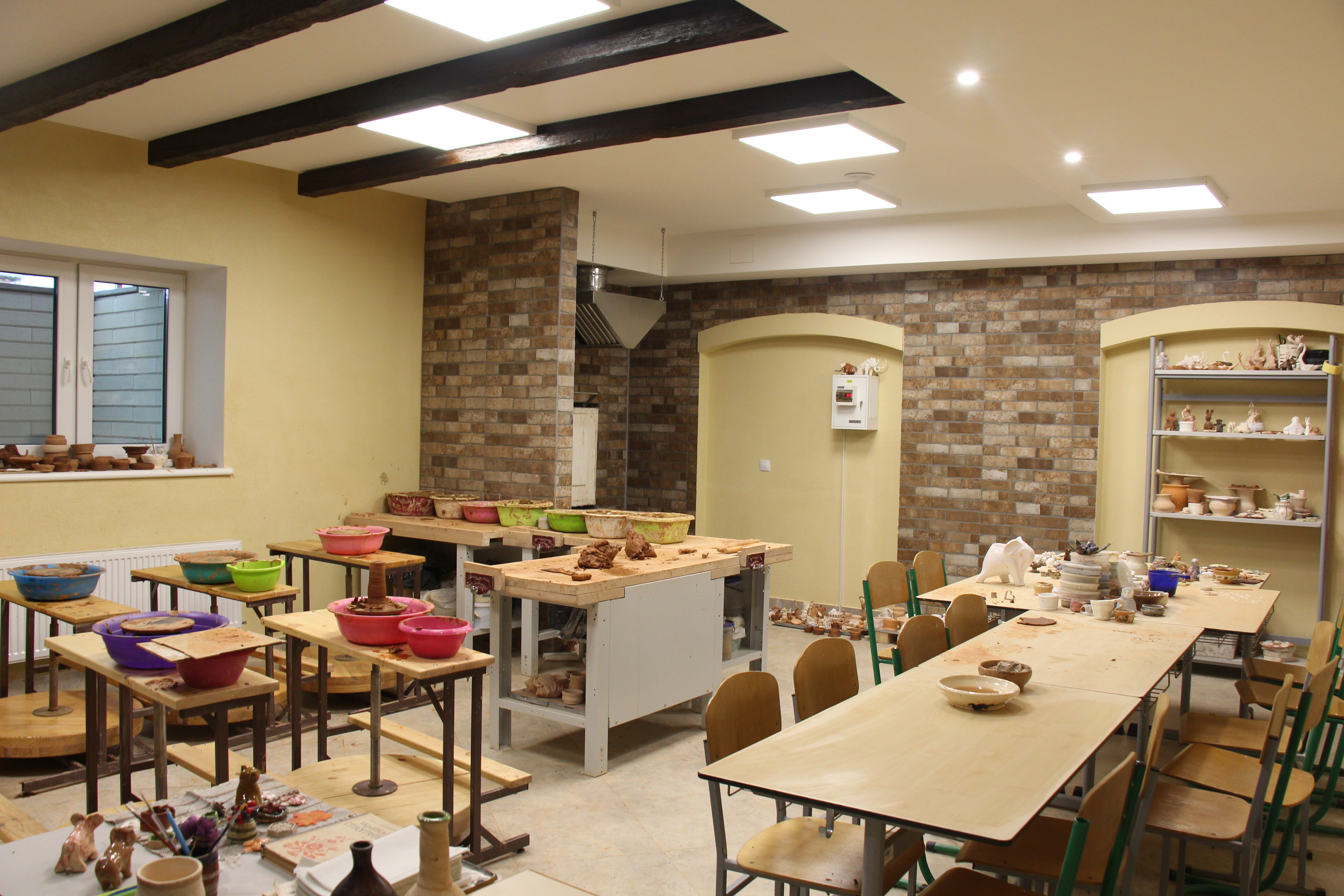
Ceramic Studio

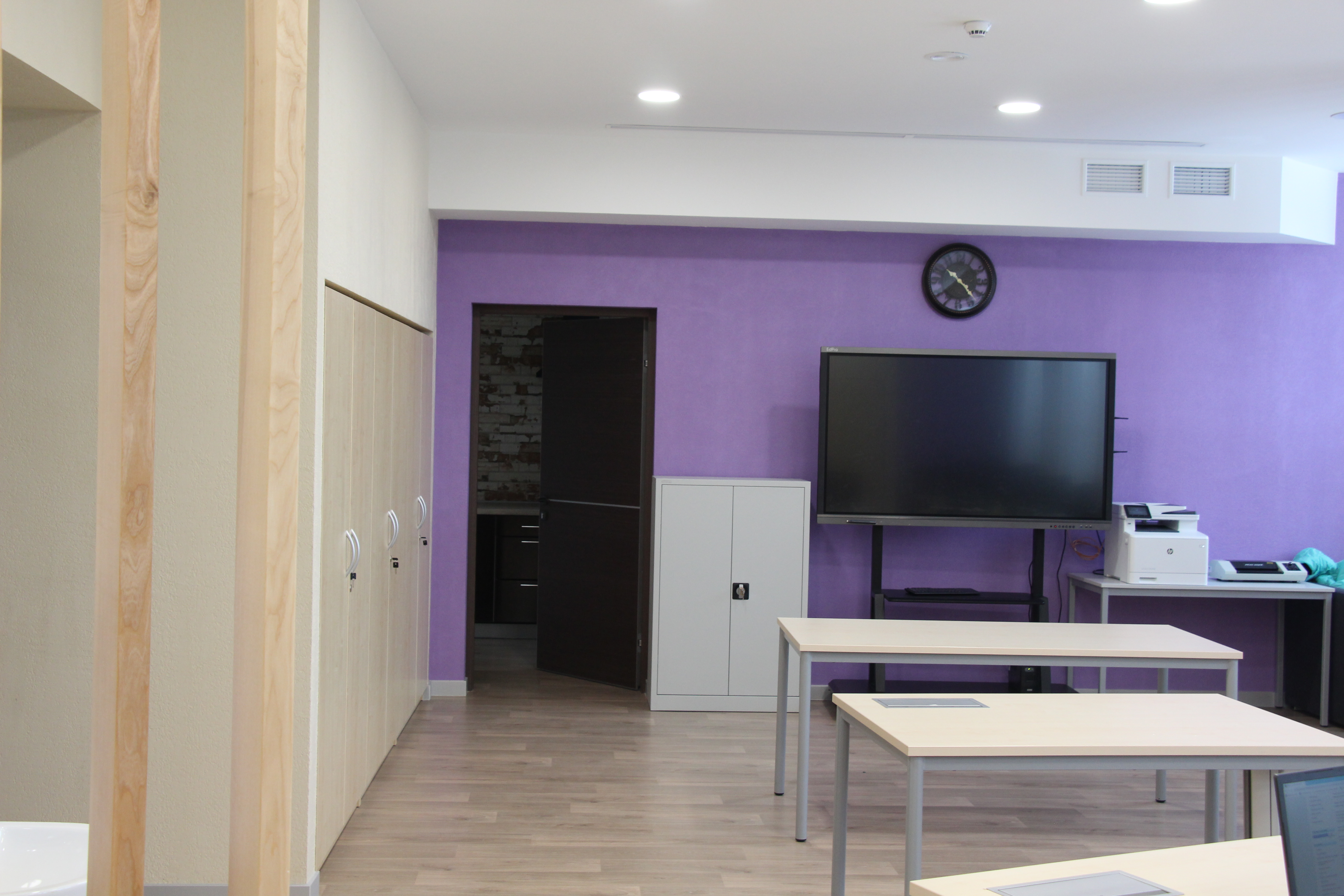
Teachers common room

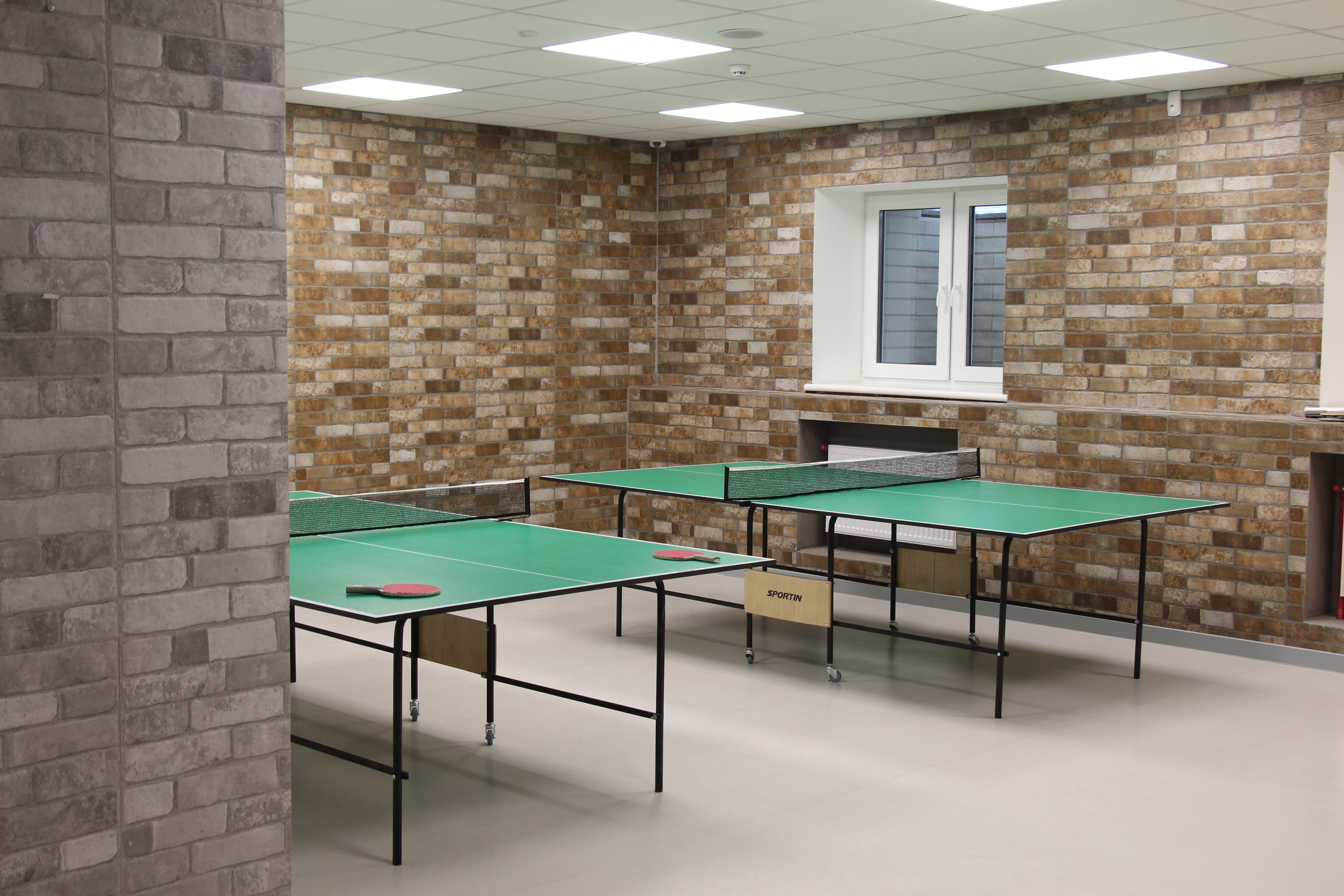
In one of the halls

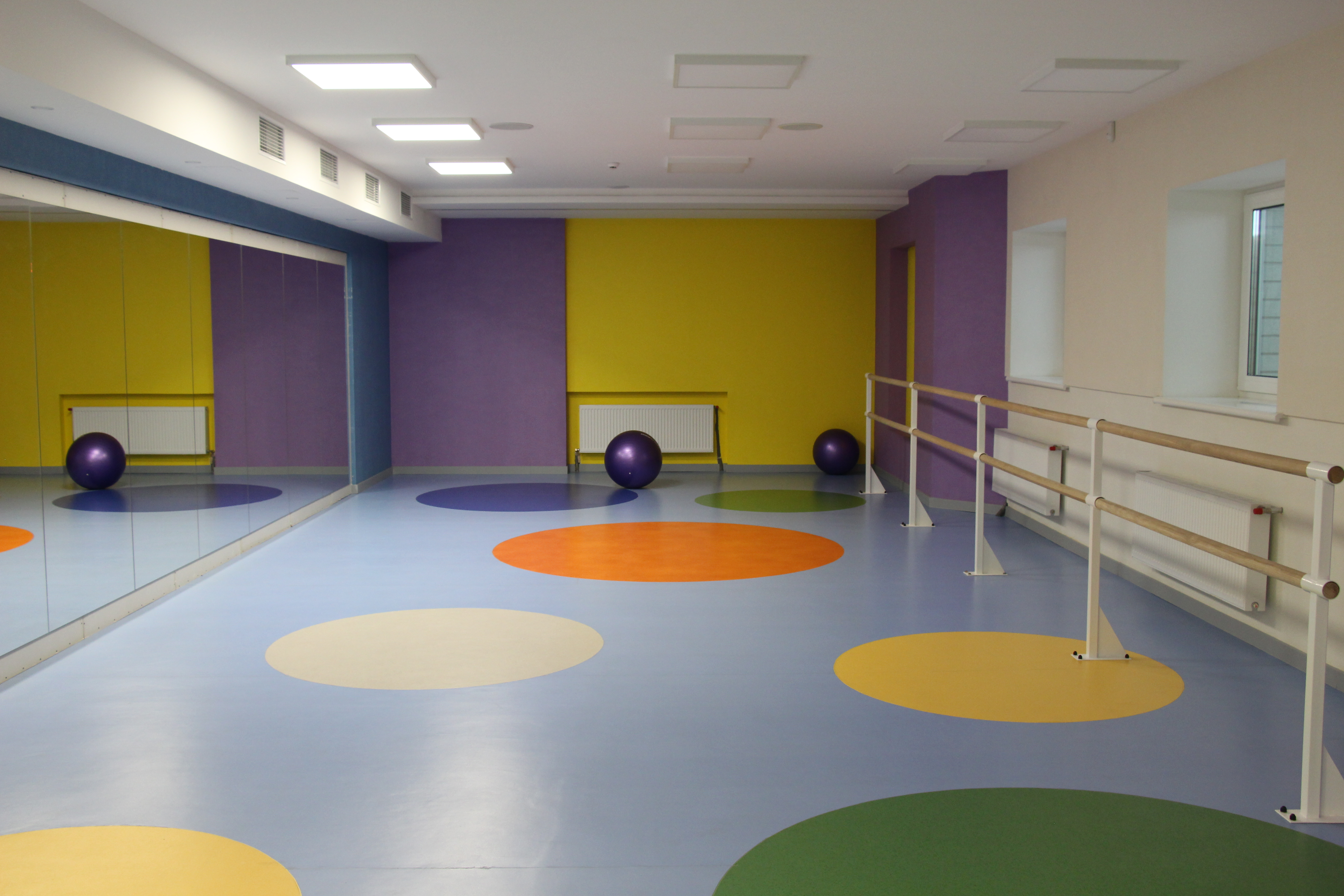
Dance Studio

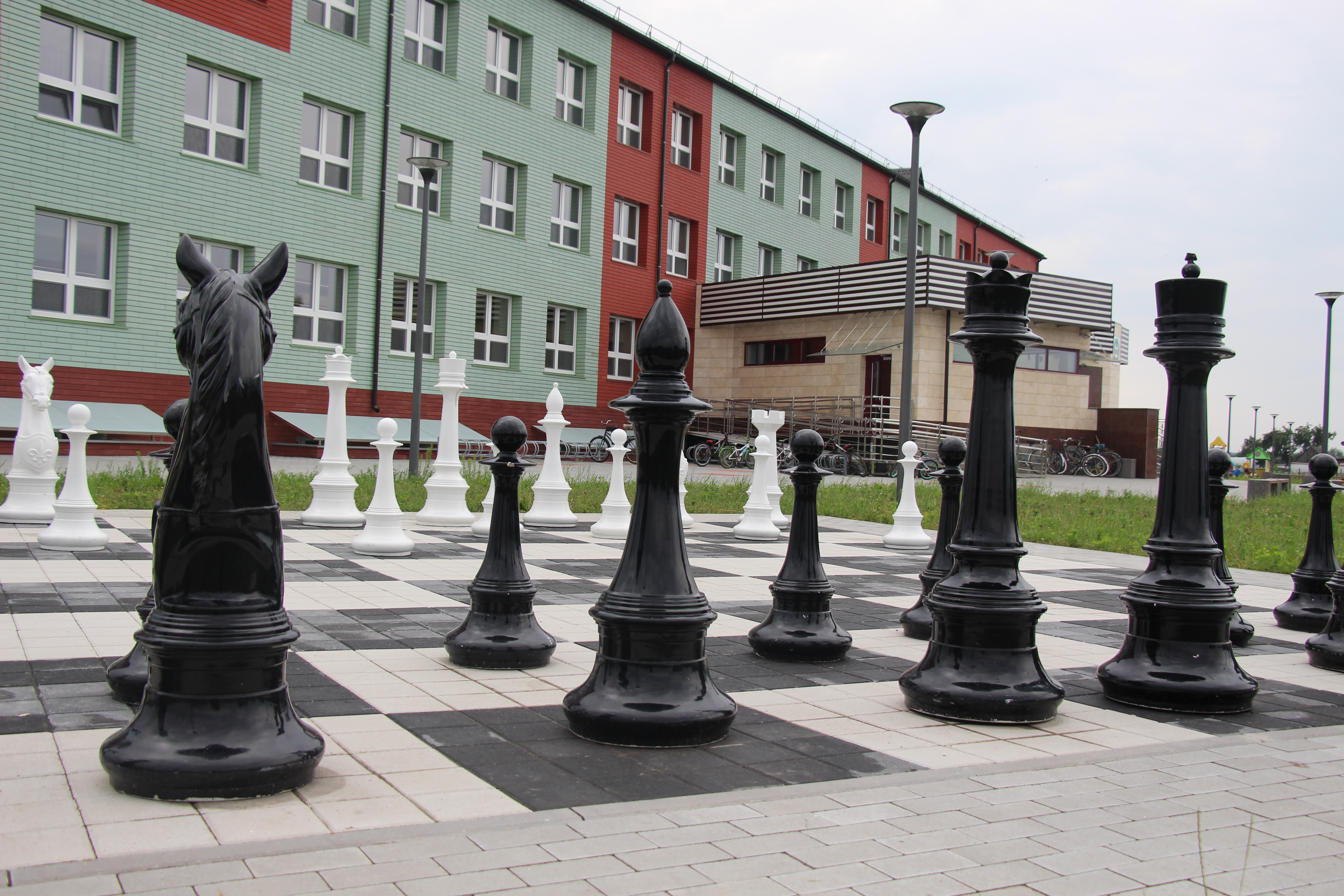
Outside chessboard

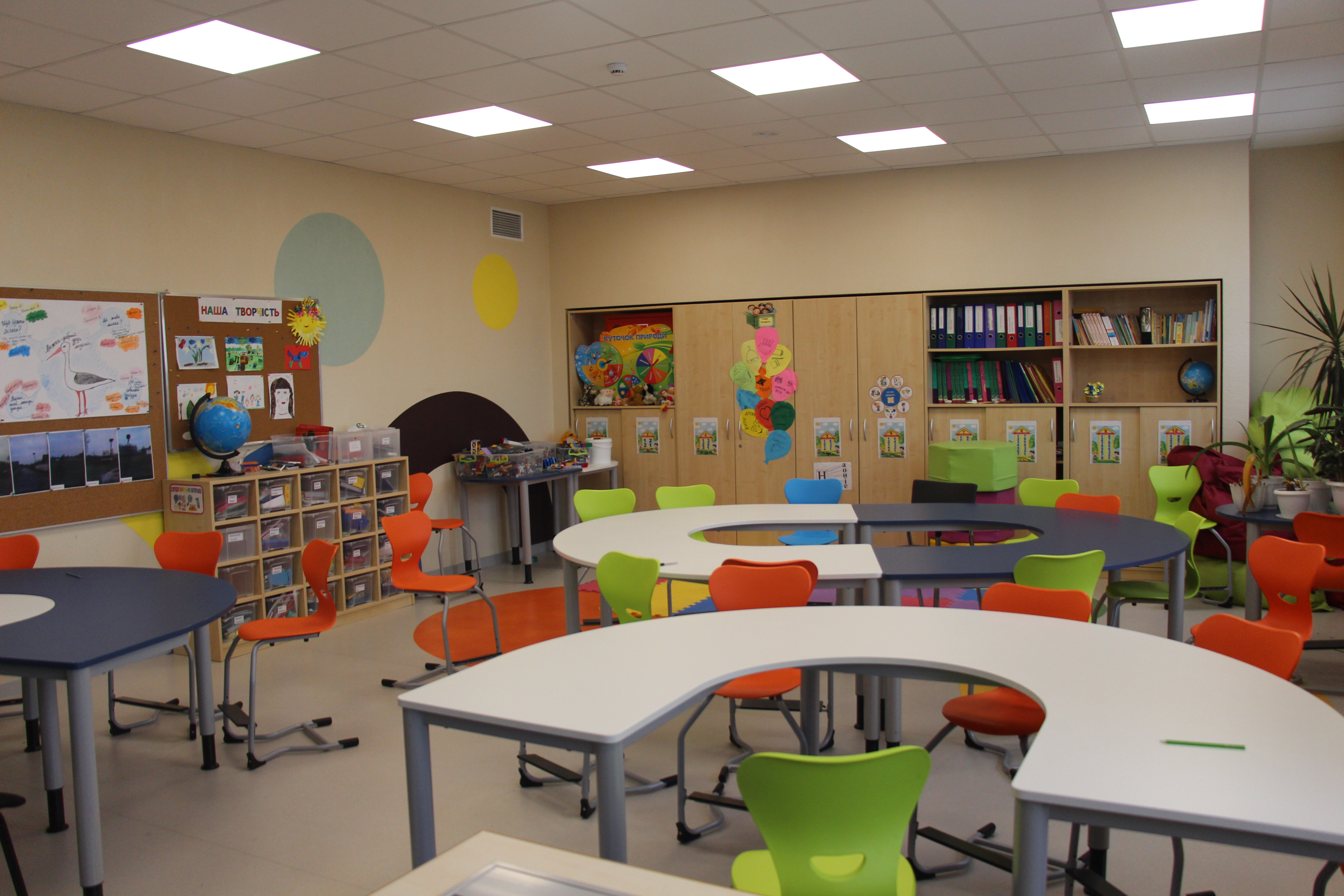
Elementary school classroom

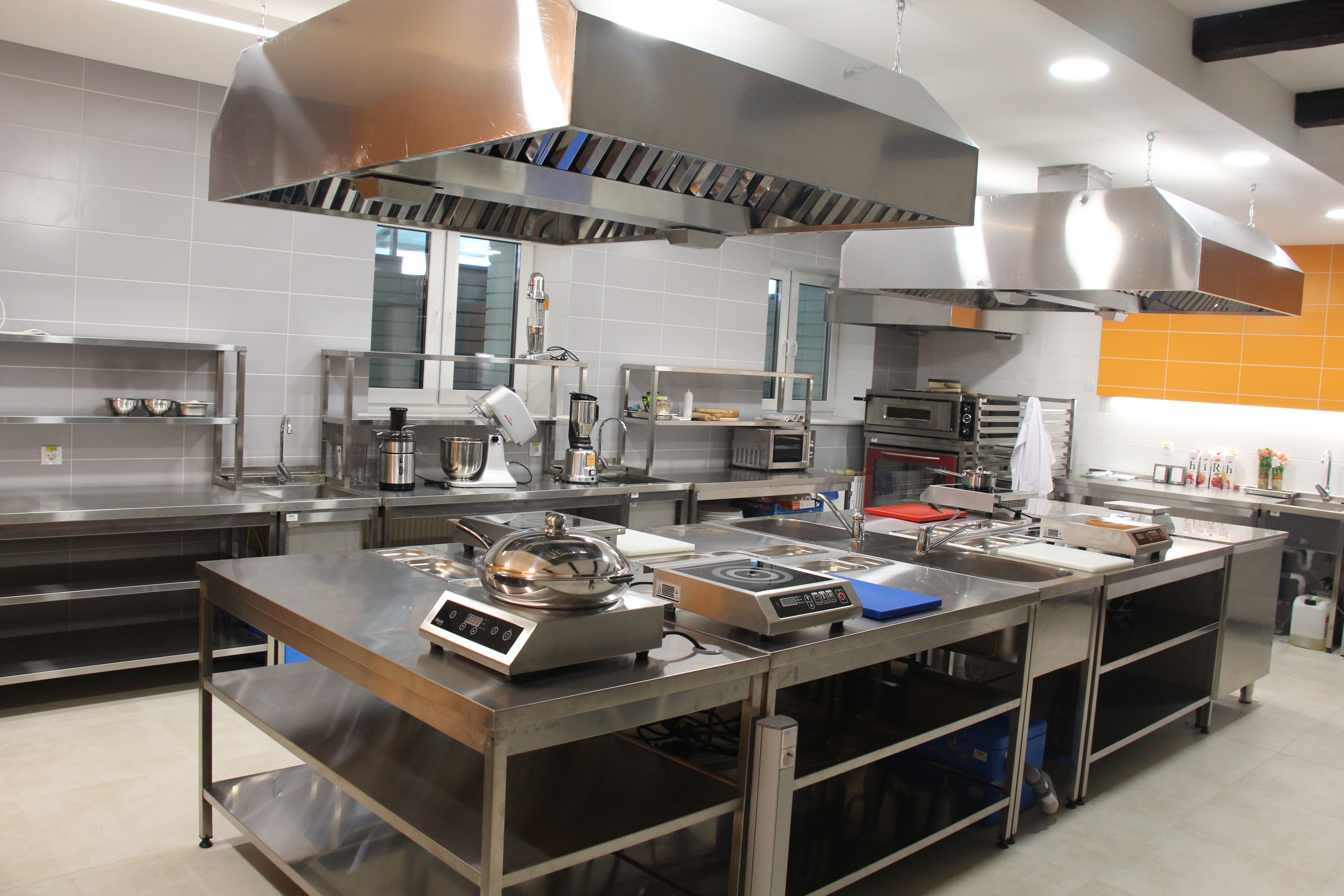
Culinary Studio

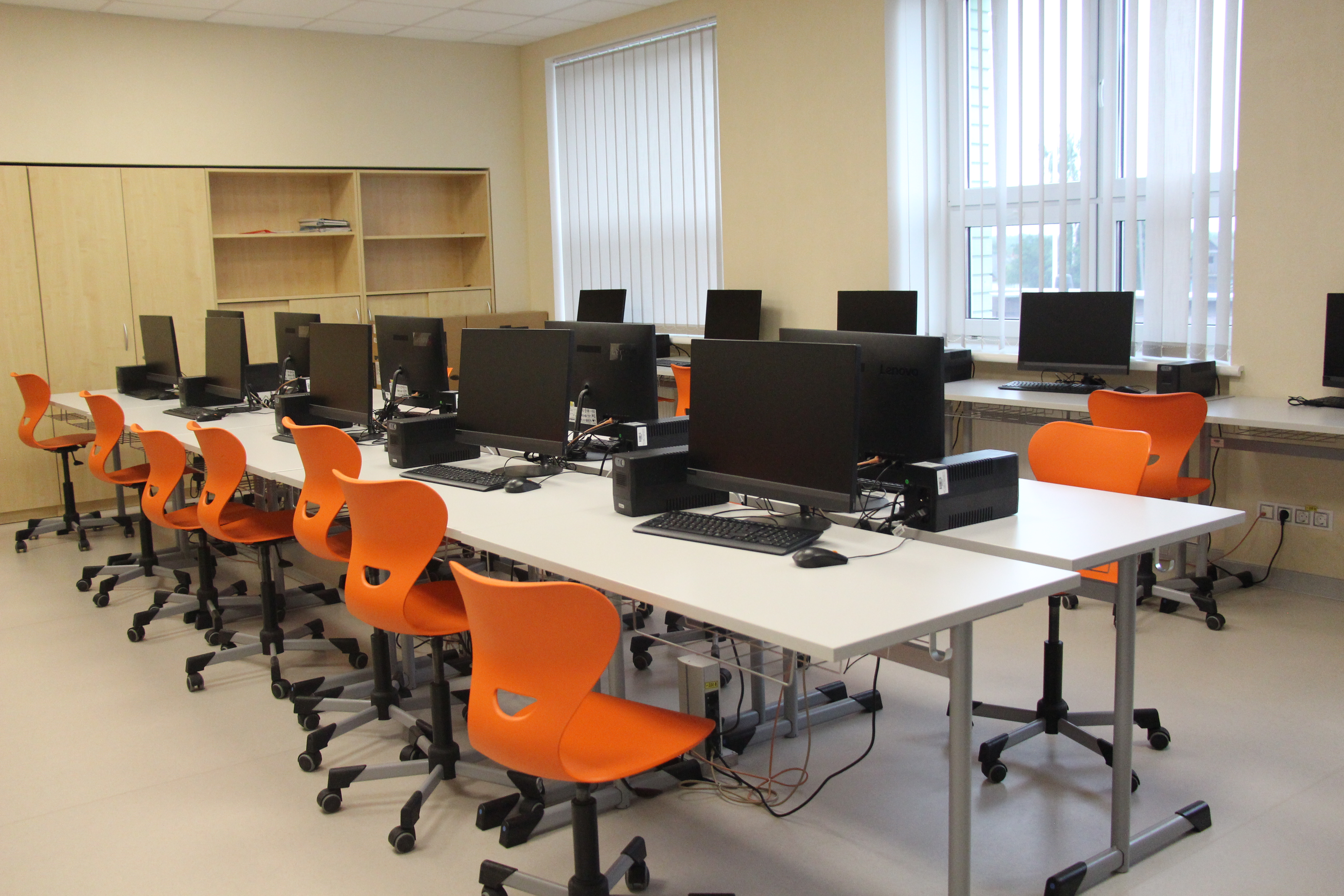
Computer science classroom

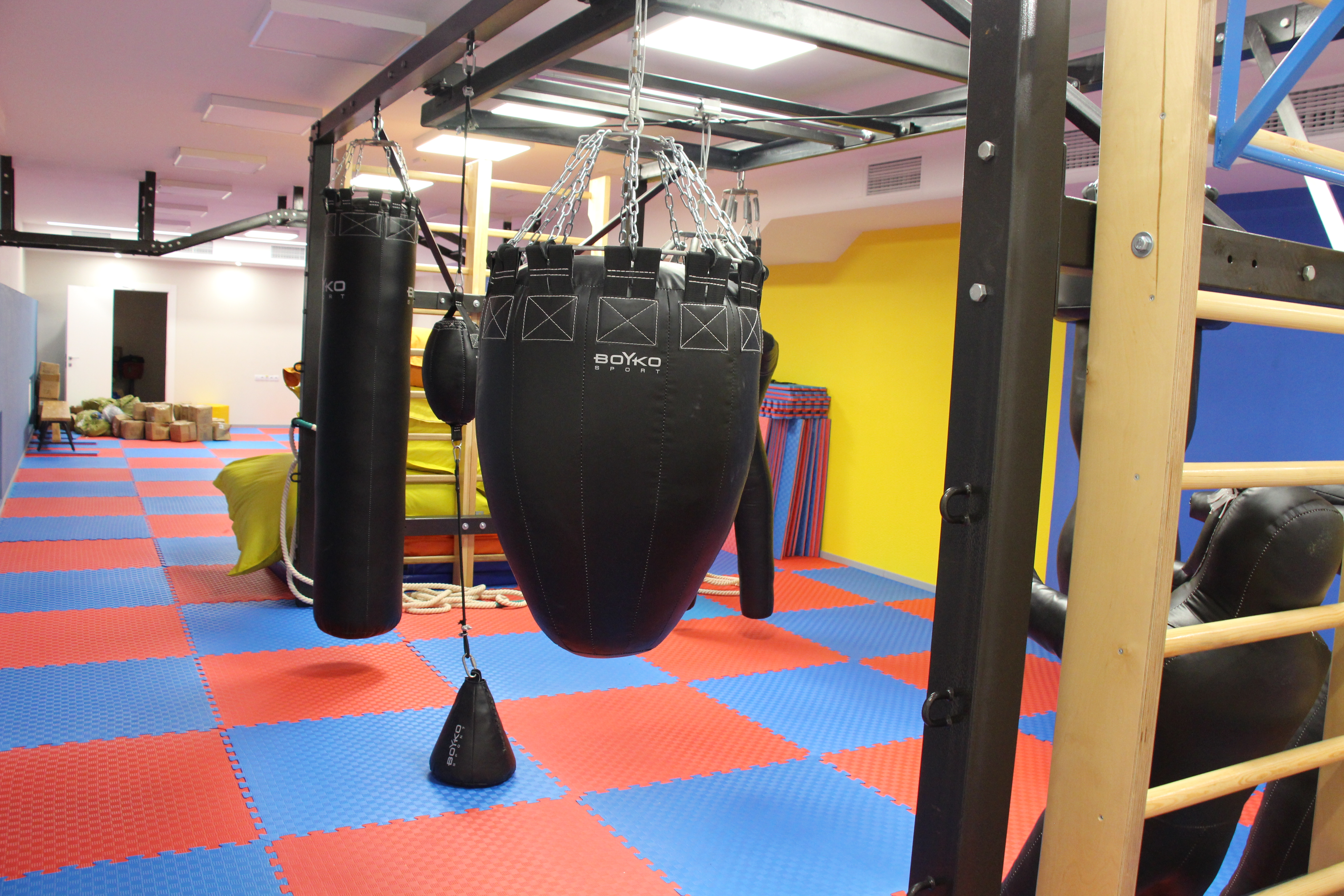
Taekwon-Do Hall
