= Ukrainian gymnasium No. 1 =

Secondary school in Ivano-Frankivsk, Ukraine

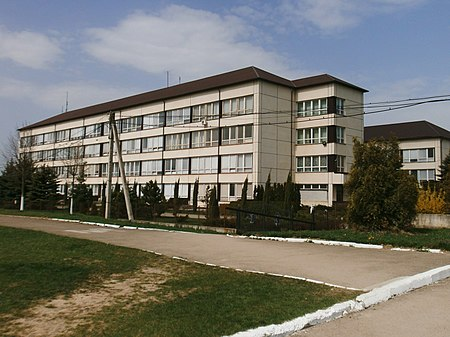

Location
- Ivano-Frankivsk city, Kalushs'ke shose 1 Ukraine
- Coordinates: 48.9446°N 24.6882°E

Information
- Type: Gymnasium
- Motto: Scientia vinces (We will win with knowledge)
- Established: 1905 (reopened 1992)
- Closed: 1944
- Principal: Deychakivskyy Ihor Ivanovych
- Employees: 52
- Enrollment: 442
- Website: gimnazia1.if.ua

Ukrainian gymnasium No.1 (Ukrainian: Українська гімназія № 1, romanized: Ukrainska himnaziia No. 1) is a gymnasium (or secondary school) in Ivano-Frankivsk. It was nominated to be one of "The 100 Best Schools of Ukraine" in 2006. Due to the results of ZNO (external independent evaluation) in Ukrainian Language and Literature in 2008, 2009 and 2015, it took the first place among the schools of Ukraine.

Diploma recipients from local primary schools are eligible to apply for admission, which is competitive, based on the results of entrance examinations in Ukrainian language and mathematics.

== History ==
=== Stanislaviv gymnasium ===
In 1905, the Austrian government agreed to open a Ukrainian gymnasium in Stanisławów in response to demand from the Ukrainian community. The gymnasium was initially located in leased premises at 26 Jan III Sobieski Street. In 1908 it moved to Lypova Street. Mykola Sabat (1867–1930) was its first principal, and served the school in that role from 1905 to 1919 and from 1923 to 1927. One of the streets in the city is named after him. In 1939, the Stanislaviv Ukrainian gymnasium was abolished by the Soviet government and reorganized into a secondary school.

=== Restored Gymnasium ===
In 1992, Ukrainian Gymnasium No.1 was founded in Ivano-Frankivsk. It considered the successor of Stanislaviv Gymnasium. Zynovii Berehovskyi became the first principal.

On 22 February 1994, the gymnasium moved to new premises at 1 Kaluska Shose.

In 2012 the gymnasium took the second place in the educational establishments ratings of "Fokus" magazine.

On 6 March 2013, the bust of Taras Shevchenko was installed in the gymnasium.

== Curriculum ==
The gymnasium offers two fields of study: the humanities and science/mathematics.

The school has departments of Ukrainian language and literature and mathematics and computer science, and teaching groups for social sciences, foreign languages, natural sciences, and aesthetic and physical education subjects.

The students of the gymnasium study English, French, German and Latin. There is a swimming pool here, and every form has three physical education classes, one of which is swimming. Dancing lessons are compulsory.

The library contains 26,103 books.

Extracurricular activities include:

- The Museum of Gymnasium History
- A scientific society ("Scientia vinces!")
- A literary studies group ("Vesnianyi Porist")
- Folk crafts, drawing and design, young journalists and radio amateurs schools and clubs
- Sports clubs
- Model choirs ("Nasha Pisnia" and "Soloveiky")
- Dance ensemble ("Edelveis")
- Student government

== Teaching staff ==
- Honored worker of education of Ukraine – 2
- Excellent workers of education of Ukraine – 16
- Teachers awarded with badges "Vasil Sukhomlynskyi" – 5
- Teacher-methodologists – 23
- Head teachers – 8
- Highest category specialists – 42
- First category specialists – 4
- Second category specialists – 2
- Specialists – 4

=== School authorities ===
- Deichakivskyi Ihor Ivanovych – principal
- Hrushevkyi Bohdan Vasylovych – vice principal responsible for teaching and educational activities
- Inkin Ernest Anatoliiovych – vice principal responsible for educational work
- Hrytsyshyn Mariia Ivanivna – vice principal responsible for teaching and educational activities

== Famous Alumni ==
- Roman Andrukhovych (born 1915) – writer and public figure.
- Lev Vasylyk (1921—2002) – pharmaceutist and public figure.
- Vasyl Velychkovsky (1903—1973) – bishop of the Ukrainian Greek Catholic Church.
- Oleksa Hirnyk – a dissident who burned himself alive near the Shevchenko grave in Kaniv on 21 January 1978 protesting russification.
- Dmytro Klyachkivsky — colonel and head-commander of the Ukrainian Insurgent Army.
- Anatoliy Kos-Anatolsky (1909—1983) – composer.
- Stepan Lenkavskyi (1904—1977) – leading figure of Organization of Ukrainian Nationalists.
- Yevhen Lozynskyi (1909—1977) – leading figure of Organization of Ukrainian Nationalists.
- Dariia Makohon-Polotniuk (Iryna Vilde) (1907—1982) – writer.
- Myroslav Skala-Starytskyi (1909—1969) – opera singer.
- Roman Smyk (1918—2007) – doctor and public figure.
- Sviatomyr-Mykhailo Fostun (1924—2004) – writer, public figure, secretary of Association of Ukrainians in Great Britain and World Congress of Free Ukrainians.
- Bohdan Yasinskyi (1923—2002) – scientist.
