= French International School of Odesa =

French International School of Odesa École française privée d‍ 'Odessa

Location
- Odesa; Ukraine
- 46.43373379920354°N 30.7641219613769°E

Information
- Type: French international school
- Established: 2013
- Website: www.efpo.com.ua

The French International School of Odessa (French: École française privée d‍ 'Odessa; Ukrainian: Французька приватна школа міста Одеси; (Note: romanized: Frantsuzka pryvatna shkola mista Odesy, lit. 'French private school of Odesa') EFPO) is a French international school in Odesa, Ukraine.

== History ==
The school opened its doors in September 2013, with the support of the French Embassy, the Alliance Française of Odessa, and AEFE.

It is operated by the group Odyssey. In 2022, the school calendar was on a holiday break when the Russian invasion of Ukraine began. The employees and students left Ukraine. The Canopé network began providing a virtual education option.
