= St. Mary Magdalene High School No. 10 in Lviv =

Coordinates: 49°50′03″N 24°00′58″E

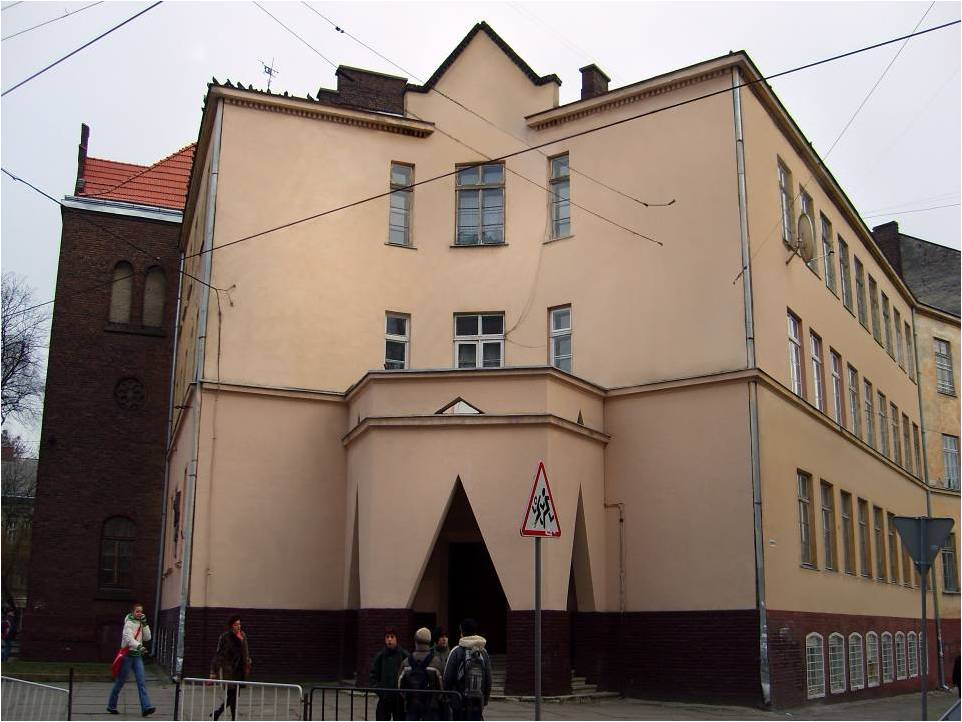

Address
- Henerala Chuprynky Street 1; 79-013 Lviv; Ukraine

Information
- Other name: Magdusia
- Former names: Trivial School
- Patron saint(s): Saint Mary Magdalene
- Established: 1816
- Principal: Marta Markunina

St. Mary Magdalene High School No. 10 in Lviv (Polish: Średnia Ogólnokształcąca Szkoła No 10 im. św. Marii Magdaleny), founded in 1816 as Lviv Trivial School and named after Mary Magdalene, is one of two high schools in Lviv, Ukraine, with bilingual instruction in Ukrainian and Polish. The school does not have the status of a Polish minority school.

== History ==
The school was founded in 1818 as an elementary school in the buildings of the former Dominican monastery next to the Church of St. Mary Magdalene, from which it took its patron saint. In 1846, the school was moved to private buildings on Leon Sapieha Street, when a hospital was set up in post-convent buildings. The school acquired a Polish character after the introduction of Polish as the official language in Galicia after 1869. In 1883, a new red brick building was built for the school.

During the Polish-Ukrainian battles for Lviv in November 1918, an outpost of the Polish defense of the city under the command of Lieutenant Adam Świeżawski was stationed in the school building. During the German-Soviet invasion of Poland in September 1939, the 1st Volunteer Scout Company was organized in the school building under the command of Lieutenant Zbigniew Czekański. In 1932, a new section, called the "white school," was added to house the boys' section of the school. The school flourished under the direction of Mieczysław Opałek in 1934–1939.

After the Second World War, more than 60 Polish schools in Lviv were closed, leaving only three open, including the Mary Magdalene School. However, the school had to move to a single "white" building, lost its patron and became known as High School No. 10. Since the 1962/63 the school was downgraded to an elementary school. At the same time, a decision was issued to liquidate the Roman Catholic parish of St. Mary Magdalene in Lviv. The church building was transferred for use to the neighboring Lviv Polytechnic Institute, and the crosses were removed from the facade. The only Polish secondary school in Lviv remained School No. 24. School No. 10 was planned to be liquidated in subsequent years, and the school authorities managed to prevent this by organizing the Felix Dzerzhinsky Museum within its walls.

After Ukraine regained its independence, the school became a secondary school again. In 2013 it regained the name of the Mary Magdalene School. In the 2014/15 school year, 183 Poles and 86 people with Polish roots attended the school, and 28 out of 31 subjects were taught in Polish. The school has 16 classrooms, a sports hall and a library. The school cooperates with other schools in Ukraine, where Polish is taught, and with several schools in Poland: VII Zofia Nałkowska High School in Kraków, School No. 83 in Warsaw, School No. 4 in Przemyśl, School Complex No. 1 in Swarzędz, and School No. 3 in Hajnówka.

== Bibliography ==
- Olechowski, Piotr (2021). ""Nie wychowywać nowej inteligencji". Trudne lata mniejszości polskiej we Lwowie 1959-1962" ["Not to raise a new intelligentsia". The difficult years of the Polish minority in Lviv 1959-1962]. Krakowskie Pismo Kresowe. 13: 287–300. doi:10.12797/KPK.13.2021.13.18.
- Placówki oświatowe na Ukrainie. Informator (in Polish). Warsaw: Fundacja Wolność i Demokracja. 2015. ISBN 978-83-939781-2-0.
