= Lviv Physics and Mathematics Lyceum =

Coordinates: 49.8258°N 23.9711°E

Lviv Physics and Mathematics Lyceum (LPML)
- Ukrainian: Львівський фізико-математичний ліцей (ЛФМЛ)
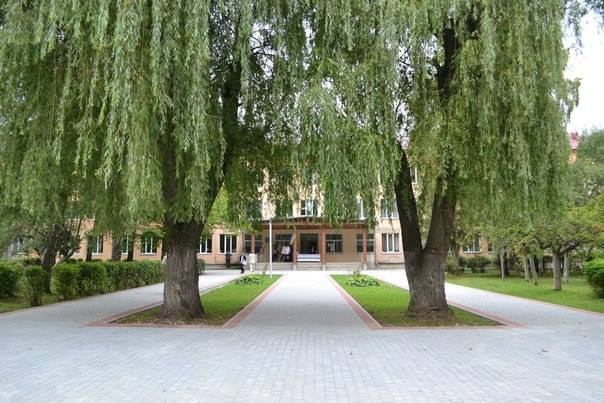

Location
- 29 Karadzhycha; Lviv, 79059; Ukraine

Information
- Founded: 1991
- Principal: Marian Dobosevych
- Grades: 8-11
- Enrolment: 555 (2022)
- Accreditation: Ministry of Education and Science of Ukraine
- Website: lpml.com.ua

The Lviv Physics and Mathematics Lyceum (also known as LPML; Ukrainian: Львівський фізико-математичний ліцей) is a public boarding high school in Lviv, Ukraine. It is considered to be one of the best educational institutions in the country. In 2012 and 2015, the Lviv Physics and Mathematics Lyceum was ranked first among high schools in Ukraine by Focus magazine. The school is well known for organizing multiple countrywide competitions in mathematics, physics ("Levenia"), programming ("Bober"), and the Ukrainian version of the international Mathematical Kangaroo contest.

== General ==
The LPML offers two programs: Physics/Mathematics (grades 8 −11) and Chemistry/Biology (grades 9−11). In the past, a third concentration, combining mathematics and geography, was also available. This concentration is no longer offered due to insufficient enrolments.

Students of the lyceum are frequently among the top participants at the National Olympiads. LPML students often represent Ukraine at various International Olympiads, including Physics (IPhO), Mathematics (IMO), and Chemistry (IChO).

== Application ==
Those who wish to study at the LPML have to pass an entry exam, with top performers offered admission. Students who previously won regional Olympiads are offered early admission without taking the entrance exam. The average annual enrolment ranges from 110 to 130 students, with around 30 students per class.

== Student life ==
Residents from out of town stay in gender-based dormitories. Nearly 25% of all LPML students reside in these dormitories.

== See also ==
Ukrainian Physics and Mathematics Lyceum
