= School of the Future (Yalta) =

Coordinates: 44.4869°N 34.1475°E

The School of the Future №2

Location
- Yalta, Krasnoarmeyskaya st. 30

Information
- Type: Public School
- Motto: Search, dream, dare!
- Established: 1971
- Principal: Khokhlikova Irina Lvovna
- Website: http://sof-yalta.ru/

The School of the Future (Yalta) is a secondary school in Yalta.

By resolution of the city administration of Yalta November 18, 2016 №4954-p Municipal Public Educational Institution «Yalta Secondary School №2 «School of the Future» "District of Yalta, Republic of Crimea" was renamed the Municipal Budgetary General Educational Institution «Yalta Secondary School №2 «School of the Future» "District of Yalta, Republic of Crimea".

== Description ==
The school was established in 1971. In 2007, the school adopted a state social target program «School of the Future», the aim of which is to provide equal access to qualitative education. Students have access to the latest computer technology, multimedia systems and Internet access. There are 16 clubs and sports sections, special courses and elective courses.

Some of the techniques implemented are providing psychological support to each student from 1st to 11th grade, individually profiled teaching at third degree school, evaluation without marks in first degree school.

There are 75 teachers at the school. The school graduated 3326 students in 38 years, 130 of whom earned a gold medal and 72 a silver. Two students are scholarship holders of Verkhovna Rada of Autonomous Republic of Crimea and Yalta city council.

Delegations of teachers from different regions of Ukraine and from Belarus, Russia, Great Britain and USA have visited «School of the Future», have come to the school. The school has cooperation agreements with Tavrida National University, Crimean State University, Yalta University of Management, Yalta Medical College, and Yalta Higher Professional College of Construction and Food Technologies.

== Awards and recognition ==
The school was presented to an all-Ukrainian seminar, Implementation of state social target program, held in September 2008, and on 11-12 of December 2008 at an all-Ukrainian Research conference «Theory and practice of development prognostic models of schools of the future». In February 2009, the school participated in the III specialized exhibition of educational services «Education - 2009» in Simferopol and was awarded a diploma then and two diplomas for creative innovation in upgrading a national system of education as a participant in XII international exhibition of educational institutions «Modern Education in Ukraine - 2009», in Kyiv 25-27 of February 2009. The school won «Event of the year» in the competition «Yalta public recognition - 2007».

== Scenes from the school ==
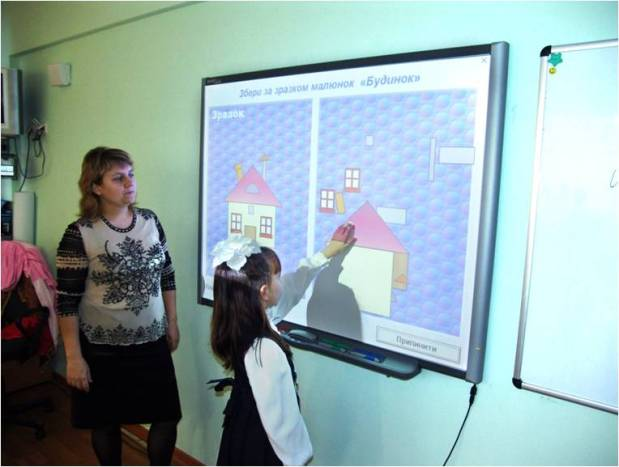
Classroom Lesson

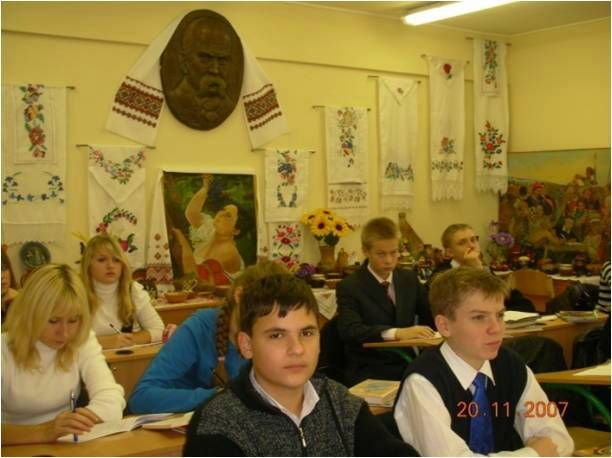
Lesson in Ukrainian Literature

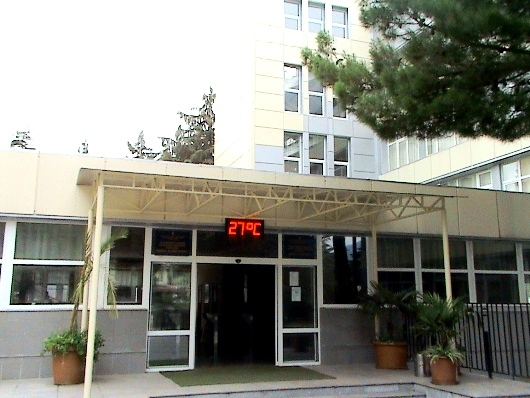
Main Entrance

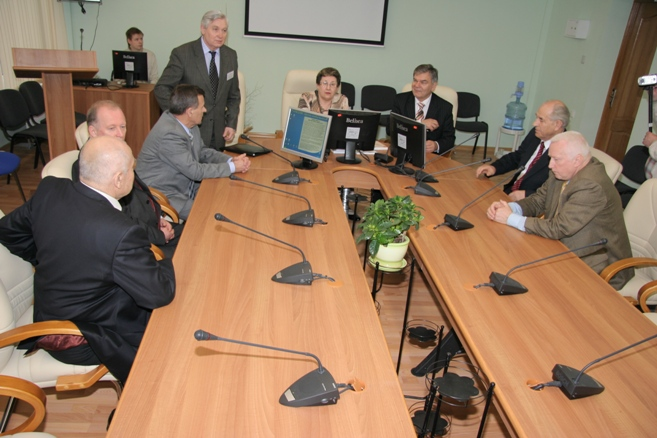
VIP Video-conference in the Conference Hall

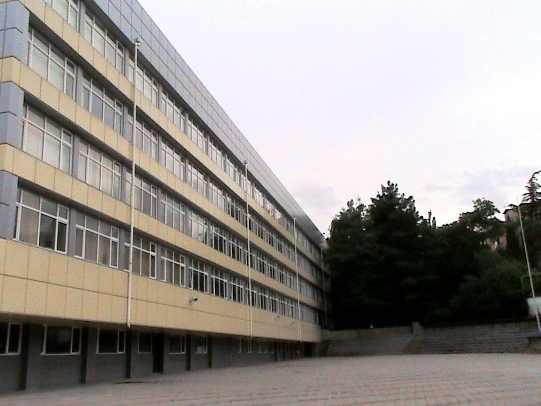
Exterior View 1

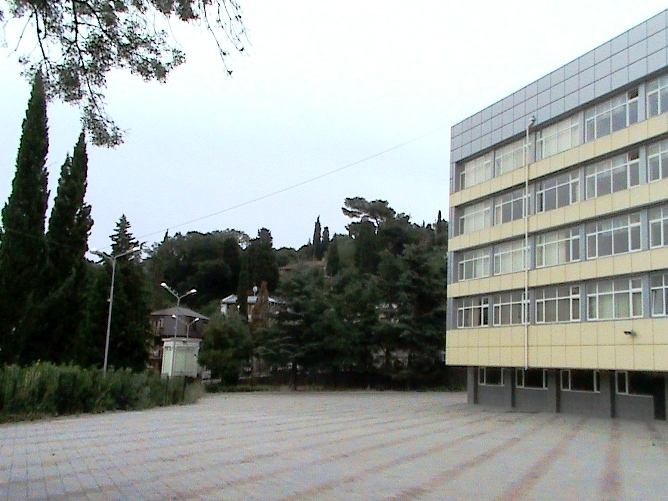
Exterior View 2

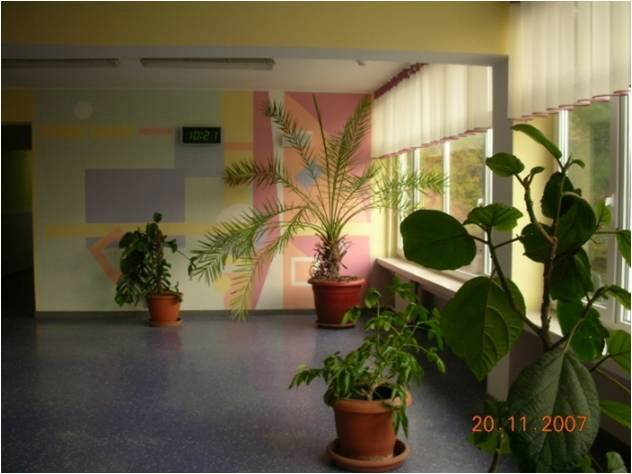
Recreation Hall
