= Lutsk Gymnasium 21 =

Lutsk Lyceum # 21 after Mykhailol Kravchuk
- Луцька гімназія № 21 імені Михайла Кравчука

Location
- 14 Kravchuka str. Lutsk; Ukraine
- Coordinates: 50°46′1″N 25°21′49″E

Information
- School type: Public school (Gymnasium)
- Established: 1986
- Principal: Kovalchuk Oleh Oleksandrovych
- Teaching staff: 110
- Grades: 1-11
- Enrollment: approx. 1200
- Language: Ukrainian
- Website: gymnasia21.lutsk.ua

Lutsk Gymnasium # 21 after Mykhailo Kravchuk (urkr. Луцька гімназія №21 імені Михайла Кравчука) is an elementary (grades 1–4), middle (grades 5–9) and high (grades 10–11) school with the specialization in some subjects, determined yearly according to the students' and parents' wishes, recommendations of senior teachers and a staff psychologist.

== Teaching Staff ==
Teaching staff includes 110 teachers, working in 8 subject streams.

== Events ==
- 1996 — school visited by Chairman of the Verkhovna Rada
- 1998 — school visited by President of Ukraine
- 2010 — President of Ukraine signed an order of commemorating a student of grade 11, Borodkina Natalia with a Taras Shevchenko stipend.
- 2014 — Gymnasium # 21 is the only school in the city of Lutsk to make in to the list of top 50 Ukrainian schools.

== Sources ==
- Янукович нагородив лучанку-школярку стипендією
