= Kyiv Christian Academy =

- Київська християнська академія
- 3 Pecherska Street, Chayky, Kyiv Oblast; Ukraine

Information
- Other name: KCA
- Type: Private Christian international school
- Established: 1993
- Enrollment: 50–60
- Language: English
- Accreditation: Association of Christian Schools International (ACSI); Middle States Association of Colleges and Schools (MSA)
- Website: kca.org.ua

Kyiv Christian Academy (KCA) is an international Christian school located in the Kyiv Oblast of Ukraine. The school is a member and accredited institution of the Association of Christian Schools International (ACSI). Its stated mission is to help fulfill the Great Commission by partnering with missionary families to offer a quality education in the English language within the framework of a Biblical worldview.

Instruction is conducted in English for students aged 4 to 18 (Pre-K through 12th grade). Graduates receive an accredited American high school diploma, which is recognized by higher education institutions in the United States and worldwide.

The school campus is situated within a gated property and includes classrooms, a science laboratory, a library, a gymnasium, two football fields, playgrounds, an auditorium, and a cafeteria. For student safety, the premises are equipped with 24-hour security and a certified 390 m^{2} (4,200 sq ft) shelter.

== History ==
The school was founded in 1993 to provide education for the children of missionaries working in Kyiv at the time. It has also enrolled, and continues to enroll, the children of the school's teachers and Ukrainian staff. In 2022, the school had an enrollment of 150 students. Following the outbreak of the Russian invasion of Ukraine, the school suspended educational operations for one year.

In 2023, the school resumed operations with 11 students, the majority of whom were Ukrainian. As of the 2025–2026 academic year, approximately 50 students are enrolled. The student body includes representatives from American, Canadian, Ukrainian, Korean, and Nigerian families. The faculty consists of educators from the United States, Slovakia, and Ukraine.

On February 25, 2005, the school obtained accreditation from the Association of Christian Schools International (ACSI). On December 1, 2012, the school and its educational programs were accredited by the Middle States Association of Colleges and Schools (M.S.A.).

== Educational programs ==
KCA utilizes a standard American educational curriculum. All core subjects are taught in English. Certain middle and high school subjects may be offered online to provide a wider selection of disciplines.

In addition to English, students can study Ukrainian and Korean as additional languages. The school also provides academic support for Ukrainian students who are concurrently enrolled in the Ukrainian national education system to fulfill Ukraine's state educational requirements.

Graduates of the school have gone on to study at various higher education institutions worldwide, including Yale University, Georgetown University, the United States Naval Academy, Carnegie Mellon University, the University of Saskatchewan, and LCC International University.

== See also ==
- Education in Ukraine
- List of international schools
