= Ukrainian Physics and Mathematics Lyceum =

Ukrainian Physics and Mathematics Lyceum (UPML)
- Ukrainian: Український фізико-математичний ліцей (УФМЛ)
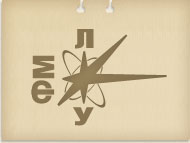

Location
- 6 Glushkova Avenue; Holosiivskyi District; Kyiv, 03680; Ukraine
- Coordinates: 50.379167°N 30.468889°E

Information
- School type: Public school, Specialized school, Boarding school, Lyceum
- Motto: Ukrainian: Олімп для лідерів (Olympus for leaders)
- Established: September 25, 1963
- Founders: Victor Glushkov, Oleksandr Shyshlovsky, Volodymyr Vyshensky, Oleksiy Borbat
- Oversight: Cabinet of Ukraine
- Director: Georgiy Salivon
- Faculty: 57
- Grades: 8–11
- Age: 13 to 18
- Enrollment: Around 300
- Language: Ukrainian
- Accreditation: Ministry of Education and Science of Ukraine
- Graduates (2013): 5,324
- Affiliation: Taras Shevchenko National University of Kyiv
- Website: www.upml.knu.ua

The Ukrainian Physics and Mathematics Lyceum (UPML) is a boarding high school and one of the few science magnet schools in Ukraine. It is located in Kyiv and affiliated with Taras Shevchenko National University of Kyiv.

== History ==
The lyceum was established in 1963 and was known as the Republican Specialized Physics and Mathematics Boarding School until 1992. In total, 5,324 students had graduated from UPML by 2013. Many of the alumni are winners of National Ukrainian and International Science Olympiads: between 1963 and 2005 as many as 65 UPML students were awarded medals at International Olympiads in Physics (IPhO), Mathematics (IMO), Chemistry (IChO) and Informatics (IOI), 148 – at all-Soviet Olympiads, and 696 – at Ukrainian National Olympiads.

The lyceum is currently publicly funded in its entirety and suffers from regular budget shortfalls. Nevertheless, tuition, board and lodging are free of charge for all admitted students.

In 2007 UPML became the first Ukrainian school with its name visible from outer space.

== Alumni ==
Students of the lyceum study from 8th through 11th grades. Due to the organizational affiliation, students of the graduating class (11th grade) have the right to be admitted to engineering and natural sciences departments of Taras Shevchenko National University of Kyiv through a preferential admission process. Between 2000 and 2005 all lyceum graduates were admitted to top universities in Ukraine and overseas: about 90% of them went on to study at Taras Shevchenko National University of Kyiv, and 6–7% at Moscow Institute of Physics and Technology.

A growing number of the lyceum alumni continue their studies overseas: in the United States, Canada, Europe and Asia. Many alumni work in the IT industry and build their careers in the R&D sector.

== See also ==
- Lviv Physics and Mathematics Lyceum
- Kyiv Natural Science Lyceum No. 145
