= State Academy of Fine Arts of Armenia =

State-owned public university in Yerevan

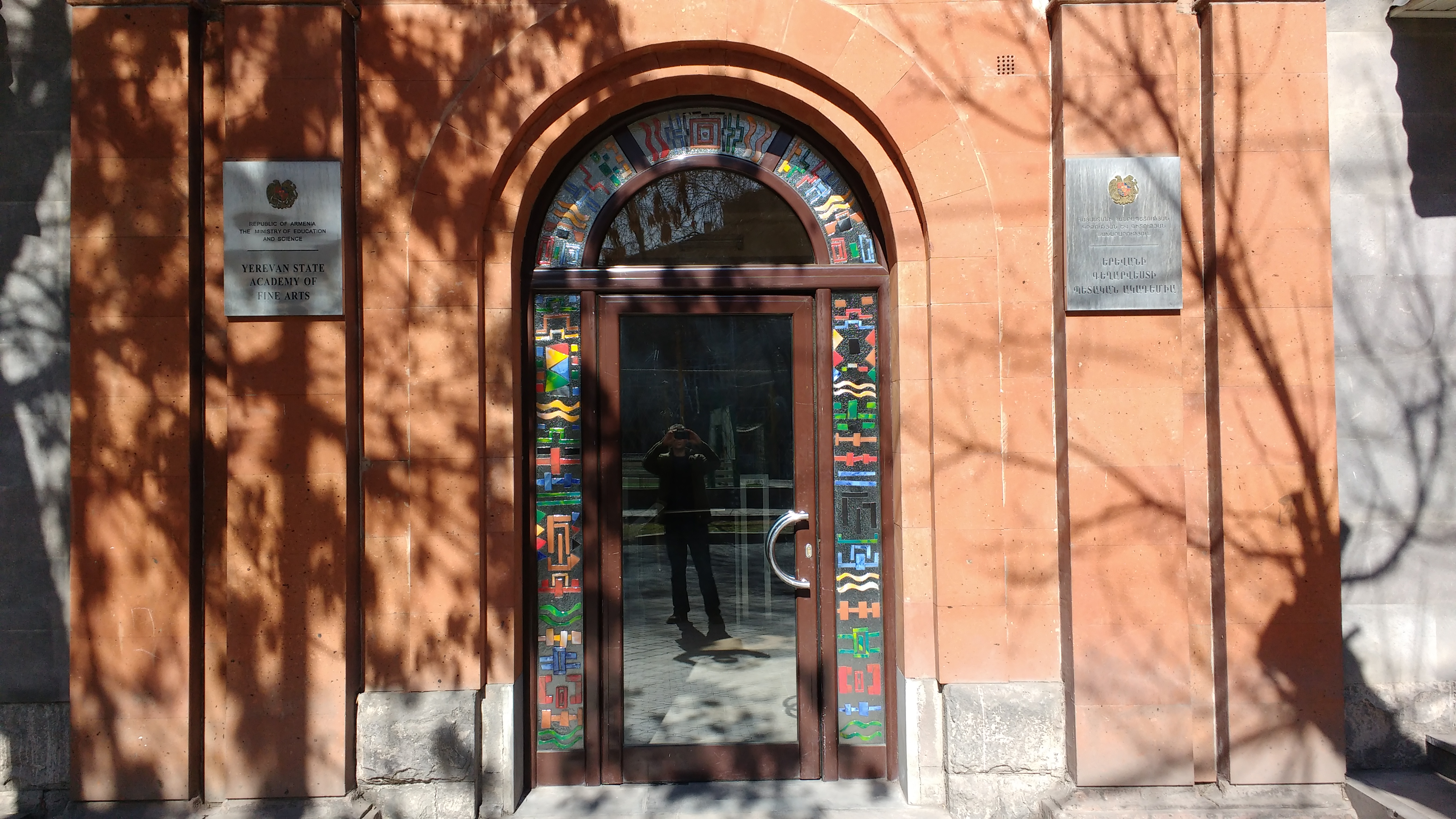
- Type: Public
- Established: June 29, 1946; 80 years ago
- Rector: Vardan Azatyan
- Location: Yerevan, Armenia; 40°11′22″N 44°31′00″E
- Campus: Urban
- Colors: Orange and maroon
- Website: Official website

State Academy of Fine Arts of Armenia (SAFAA, Armenian: Հայաստանի գեղարվեստի պետական ակադեմիա), is a state-owned public university located in Yerevan, Armenia. Founded in 1946, operating jointly with the Yerevan State Institute of Theatre and Cinematography, the Fine Arts Academy had become independent since 1994.

The academy is located on 36 Isahakyan street of the central Kentron District of Yerevan.

The rector of the academy is Professor Vardan Azatyan.

== History ==
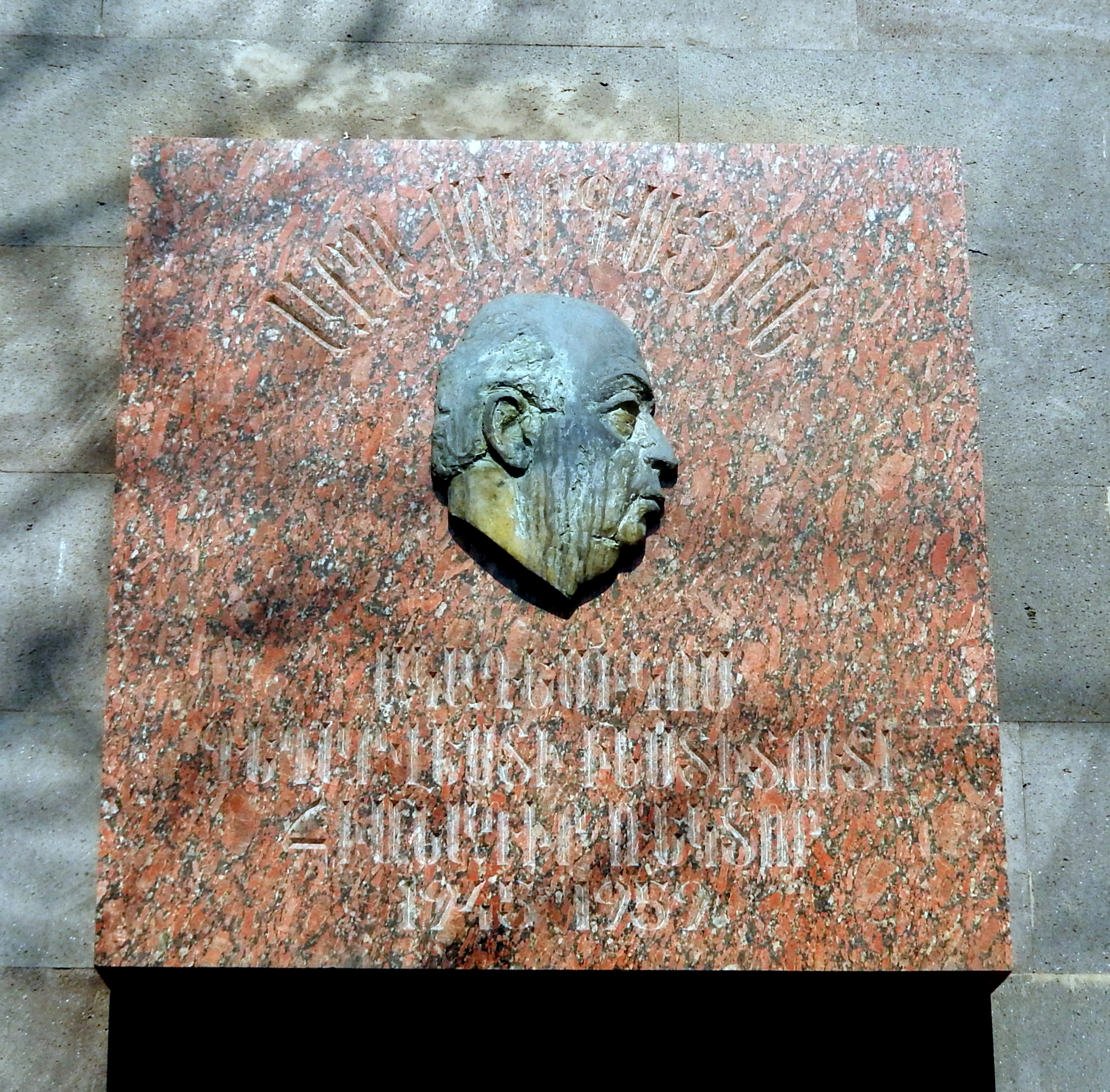
Ara Sargsian's Plaque on Isahakyan Street of Yerevan

Renowned sculptor Ara Sargsian and the father of Armenian fine arts Martiros Saryan made several trips to Moscow for negotiations with the committee leaders to get permission. Finally, in the spring of 1944 a permission by the USSR relevant committee to open Fine Arts Institute was granted, which was approved in July 1945 by a decree of the Armenian Central Committee and the Council of People's Commissars.
First entrance exams were held in the summer of 1945. The sculptor Ara Sargsian was appointed the first rector of the institute.
Two departments were opened from the outset: painting and sculpture with Martiros Saryan and Ara Sargsian as the deans of each. The two departments included chairs of painting, drawing, printmaking, theory and history of fine arts, which were founded and headed by Gabriel Gyurjyan, Ara Sargsian, Hakob Kojoyan, Vramshapuh Shakaryan and Yeghishe Martikyan. They were assisted by both acclaimed masters and young artists, among them Suren Stepanyan, Aharon Khudaverdyan, Ararat Gharibyan, Ruben Drambyan, Grigor Aharonyan, Eduard Isabekyan, Ara Bekaryan, Mher Abeghyan, Arpenik Nalbandyan, Vahan Harutyunyan, Karapet Metsaturyan, Eda Abrahamyan and Tereza Mirzoyan.
In 1952 Theatre and Fine Arts Institutes were merged and moved to a former school building in Isahakyan Street by decree of the Council of Ministers of the Soviet Union. The new Institute of Fine Arts and Theatre reorganized into two departments: fine arts and theatre arts each with its subdivisions.
The opening of ceramics department in 1955 was a major achievement in 50s and 60s. Famous decorative-applied arts master Hripsime Simonyan was the founding head of the department. Participation in the graduate exhibition of the Soviet Union Republic art universities held in Moscow (1956), the opening of the department of textile and tapestry, folk art and traditional crafts (1961), as well as the establishment of a new chair of design (1963) marked the series of important events of the period. Chief painter of Yerevan Opera and Ballet Theatre Ashot Mirzoyan became the first Head of the chair.
In 1994 Fine Arts and Theatre Institutes split up. Fine Arts Institute remained in the old building in Isahakyan Street. Aram Issabekyan was appointed as the rector of the new institute. In 1997 a new building next to the main one was acquired through great efforts. Dilapidated building was repaired and given to the Department of Design and Decorative-Applied Arts.
The branch of Fine Arts Institute opened in Gyumri in 1997 and in Dilijan in 1999. As an encouragement to the institute's research activity and promotion of its students’ potential, Fine Arts Institute launched post-graduate studies in 1999.
In 2000 after long and persistent efforts of Aram Issabekyan and by decree of the RA Government, Fine Arts Institute was renamed into Yerevan State Fine Arts Academy and entered a new development phase through the Bologna Process. Opening of the Albert and Tove Boyajian Exhibition Hall in 2001 next to the institute building marked another important step to promote artistic life of the institute (Irina Isabekyan - Head of “Alber and Tove Boyadjian” Exhibition-Hall). Scientific research is very important for any university. It enables professors to combine pedagogical skills with science activity. The result of the research is the Collection of Scientific Articles issued since 1971, which was reissued in 2004 as a Yearbook. Other than that, in 2013 a Fine Arts Academy Yearbook: Art Historical and Humanitarian Researches was published in a new format and layout.

In 2017 Yerevan State Academy of Fine Arts was renamed into State Academy of Fine Arts of Armenia.

== Faculties and programmes ==
The Yerevan State Academy of Fine Arts is a three-tier system that offers bachelor, master and researcher programmes with four, two and three-years courses respectively.

The academy has 2 faculties: the Faculty of Fine Arts, and the Faculty of Design and Decorative Applied Arts.

Currently, the following bachelor and master programmes are the offered by the academy:

- Painting (Faculty of Fine Arts)
- Sculpture (Faculty of Fine Arts)
- Graphics (Faculty of Fine Arts)
- Applied Fine Arts (Faculty of Fine Arts)
- Design (Faculty of Design and Decorative Applied Arts)
- Computer Graphic Design (Faculty of Design and Decorative Applied Arts)
- Fashion Design (Faculty of Design and Decorative Applied Arts)
- History and Theory of Fine Arts (Faculty of Design and Decorative Applied Arts)

=== Branches ===
Concerned with psychological recovery, creation of job opportunities for young people and as an encouragement of the population in the disaster area in 1988, the branch of Fine Arts Institute opened in Gyumri in 1997. It has five chairs: Painting, Sculpture and Decorative-applied Arts, Printmaking, Outfit Modeling, Arts and Humanities

The second branch opened in Dilijan in 1999, which aimed at promoting the arts and crafts typical of the region. The main focus of studies is carpet weaving, ornamental art, stylized textiles and outfit modeling.

== Study ==
Alongside its branches, the academy adopted the cycles of higher education since the year 2004-2005 (YSAFA has moved onto a three-tier system that offers bachelor, master and researcher programmes (four, two and three years respectively)). Educational programs were sufficiently upgraded aimed at the development of students’ analytical and critical skills, as well as encouragement of independent research. The system of credits was introduced; international collaboration of universities was launched and developed.

== Rectors ==
- Ara Sargsyan (1945–1959)
- Martin Charyan (1959–1974)
- Vahagn Mkrtchyan (1974–1994)
- Aram Isabekyan (1994)
- Vardan Azatyan (2024)

=== Branches ===
- Garik Manukyan, Gyumri campus
- Ghazar Ghazaryan, Dilijan campus

=== Vice-rectors ===
- Eghishe Martikyan (1945–1953)
- Suren Danielyan (1954–1965)
- Manuk Hovsepyan (1966–1983)
- Romanos Sargsyan (1984–1985)
- Alexandr Qocharyan (1985–1990)
- Aram Isabekyan (1990–1994)
- Svetlana Gevorgyan (1994–2012)
- Susanna Karakhanyan (2012–2014)
- Mkrtich Ayvazyan (2015)
- Stepan Yezdoghlyan for Economic & Financial Affairs

== Student Council ==
YSAFA Student Council is a self-governed body, an elective representative structure aimed at uniting students and protecting their interests. It is designed to ensure the processes of student autonomy and self-government, to contribute to students’ social, cultural, scientific, creative, intellectual, moral and spiritual development. As a student self-governed body it was formed in September, 1993.
Student Council has so far been presided by Emin Petrosyan, Arman Tsaturyan, Hayk Martirosyan (2005–2007), Gevorg Soghomonyan (2007–2009), Margarita Sirekanyan (2009–2012). Since October 2012 it has been headed by Eduard Avetisyan.

== Famous graduates ==
- Marie Rose Abousefian
- Artashes Abrahamyan
- Ruben Adalyan
- Karen Aghamyan
- Sargis Arutchyan
- Vaghinak Aslanyan
- Hmayak Avetisyan
- Grigor Azizyan
- Arkady Baghdasaryan (Arko)
- Getik Baghdasaryan
- David Bejanyan
- Hovhannes Bejanyan
- Garegin Davtyan
- Robert Elibekyan
- Henri Elibekyan
- Saro Galents
- Vruir Galstian
- Ruben Ghevondyan
- Alexandr Grigoryan
- Anatoli Grigoryan
- Stella Grigoryan
- Mikayel Gyurjyan
- Ara Harutyunyan
- Hrant Hovsepyan
- Manuk Hovsepyan
- Aram Isabekyan
- Norayr Karganyan
- Grigor Khanjyan
- Seyran Khatlamajyan
- Henrik Mamyan
- Levon Manaseryan
- Sargis Muradyan
- Suren Nazaryan
- Anatoli Papyan
- Samvel Petrosyan
- Suren Safaryan
- Hambardzum Sahakyan
- Vladimir Sahakyan
- Mkrtich Sedrakyan
- Henrik Siravyan
- Levon Tokmajyan
- Varuzhan Vardanyan
- Vahan Xorenyan
- Rafael Ghazaryan
- Valery Geghamyan

== Exhibitions ==
The academy has a permanent exhibition hall named after Albert and Tove Boyajian, opened on 1 May 2001.

== International relations ==
The Yerevan State Academy of Fine Arts has international agreements with many French universities including the Marseille School of Fine Arts in France, Reims School of Art and Design, Limoges-Aubusson National School of Art, and Lyon State School of Fine Arts.

YSAFA also obtained a number of bilateral agreements of cooperation with higher educational institutions of many other countries including:

- Tomas Bata University in Zlín, Czech Republic,
- Saint Petersburg Stieglitz State Academy of Art and Design, Russia,
- Art Academy of Latvia, Riga,
- Information Systems Management Institute of Riga, Latvia.
