= Grigor Khanjyan =

- Գրիգոր Խանջյան
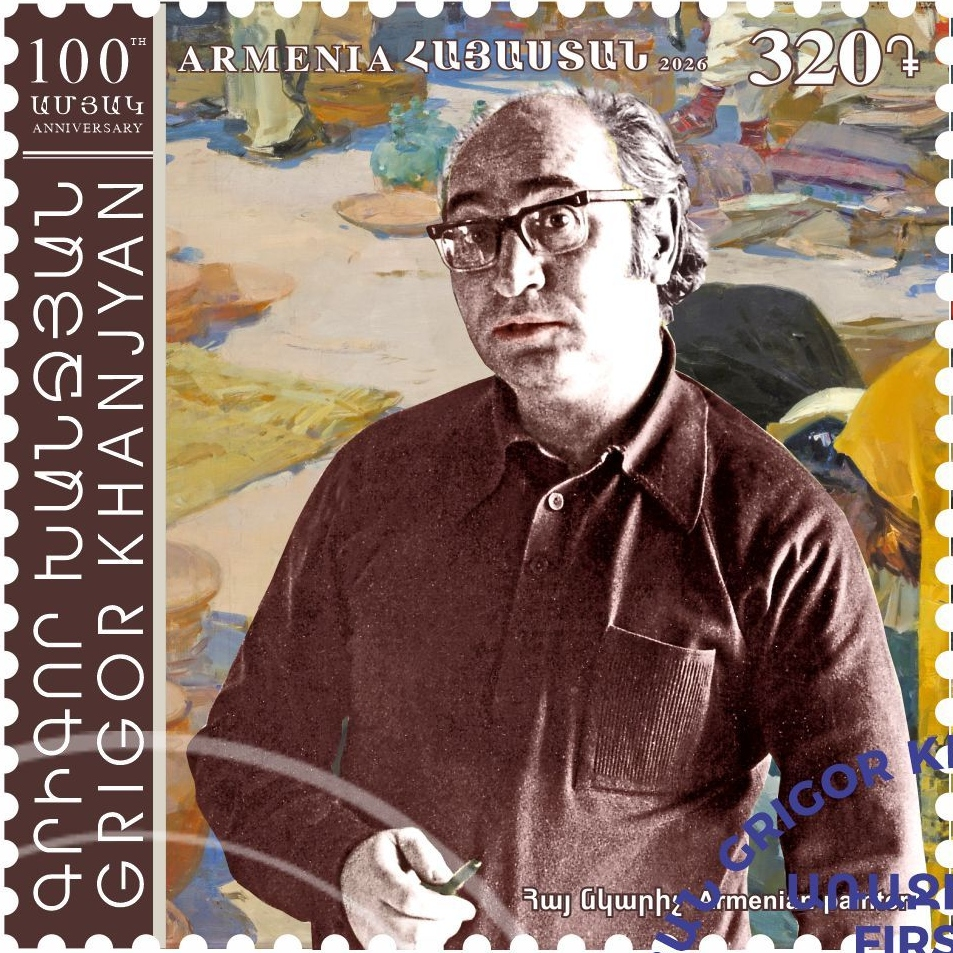
- Khanjyan on a 2026 stamp of Armenia
- Born: November 29, 1926; Yerevan, Armenian SSR, Transcaucasian SFSR, Soviet Union
- Died: April 19, 2000 (aged 73); Yerevan, Armenia
- Known for: History painting
- Notable work: Illustrations for Wounds of Armenia, Triptych "History of Armenia"
- Movement: Socialist realism

Grigor Khanjyan (Armenian: Գրիգոր Խանջյան; 29 November 1926 – 19 April 2000) was a Soviet and Armenian artist, painter, and illustrator. He is most notable for his illustrations of historical novels and poems, and murals and tapestries on historical topics. In 1983 Khanjyan was appointed a member of the highest order of chivalry in Soviet art (only 159 members during Soviet history) – the "People's Artist of Soviet Union".

== Biography ==
=== Early years ===
Khanjyan was born in Yerevan, Soviet Armenia. He was the fourth and last child of Sebuh and Verginie – genocide survivors from Yerznka, who settled in Armenia in 1920. Grigor mentioned on several occasions that a doctor had advised his mother, already in relatively advanced age, to get pregnant in order to avoid some health problems and that is the reason for him to be conceived. Soon after Sovietization of Armenia, Sebuh had to leave his main profession and become an accountant. Grigor had one elder brother who became a musician.

=== Education ===
Panos Terlemezian – who was a friend of Sebuh Khanjyan – first discovered art talent in little Grigor. In 1945, Grigor finished the coursework at Terlemezian Art College in Yerevan and at the age of 19 (together with fellow painters Levon Manaseryan and Van Khachatur) entered the Academy of Fine Arts in Yerevan. At the Academy Khanjyan mostly studied under the guidance of the prolific thematic-compositional artist Eduard Isabekyan whose influence was strong on the style of Khanjyan's works in early years.

=== Nationalist painter ===
Khanjyan never joined the Communist Party (something highly expected for having success in the Soviet Union) and had opted for nationalist instead of Soviet very often. For example, for his graduation work he chose the topic of 1907 Communist Congress in London, but pictured Stepan Shaumian (ethnic Armenian) instead of Joseph Stalin (as expected) next to Lenin. In 1965, for the All-Soviet Exhibition of Graphic Art Khanjyan sent his illustrations of Paruyr Sevak's The Unsilenceable Belfry – a story of Armenian genocide.

Further, in 1966 he joined the supreme spiritual council of the Armenian Apostolic Church and befriended the Catolicos Vazgen I. For the church he created large-scale tapestries depicting episodes from Armenian history – Battle of Avarayr and Creation of Armenian Alphabet. As the tapestries were held in the Patriarchate buildings, where the common Soviet people could not enter, Khanjyan was asked by Karen Demirchyan (then the head of Armenian Communist Party) to reproduce the works as murals at the newly finished Yerevan Arena for Sport and Music (Hamalir). Instead, Khanjyan created the second largest in the Soviet Union theatrical curtain – Mother Armenia – for Hamalir and followed the advice of his friend, architect Jim Torosyan and made the murals at the Yerevan Cascade (now Cafesjian Museum of Art, then still under construction). Further, he added a third part – Rebirth of Armenia – to make the murals in a form of a triptych. Thus, Rebirth of Armenia was to conclude the triptych History of Armenia with the greatest figures of 20th century Armenia on it (by the time of the artists demise in 2000, the work was still not finished).

=== Memberships in various organisations ===
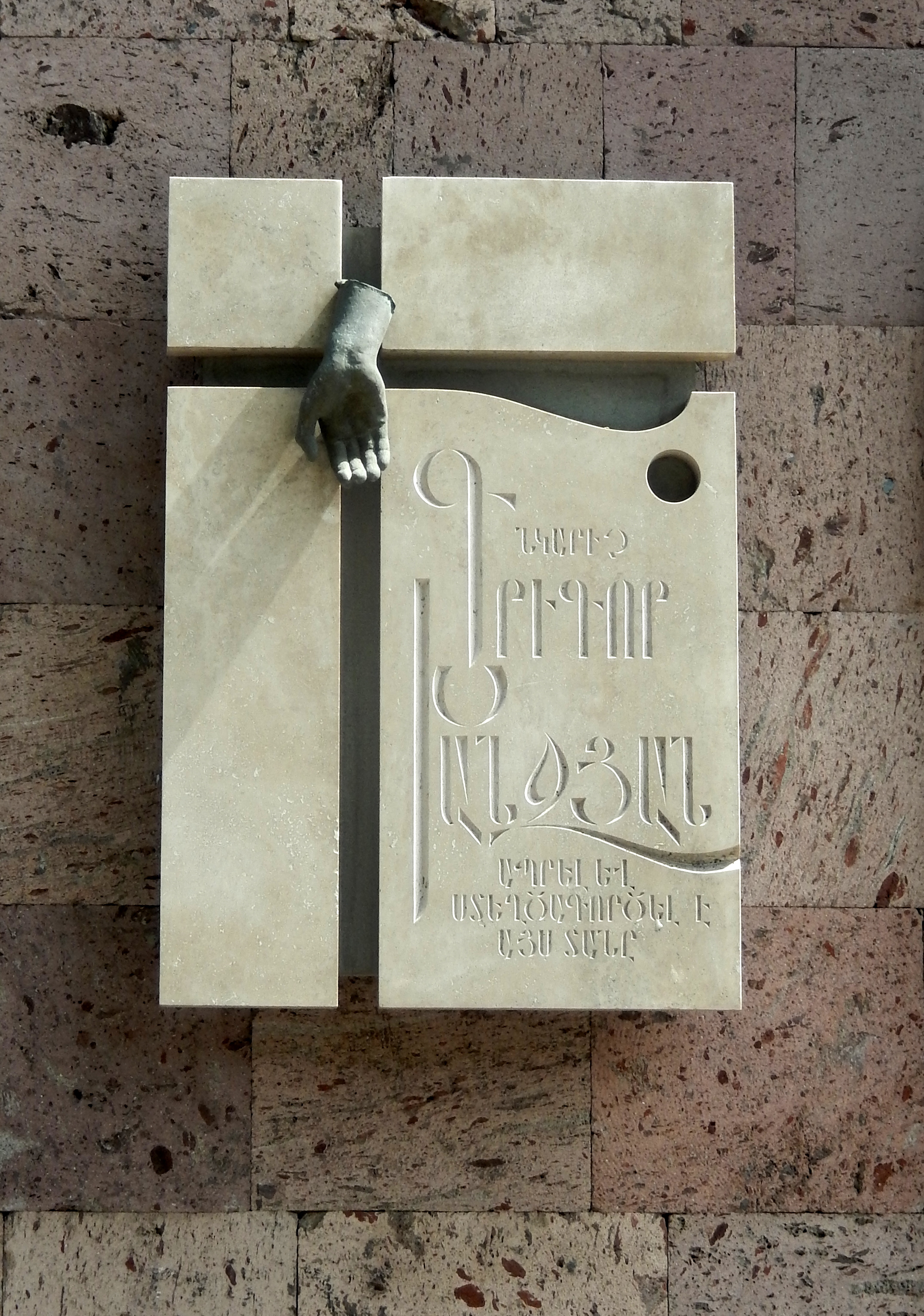
Commemorative plaque on Khanjyan's house in Yerevan

In 1990, Khanjyan accepted the invitation from the Academy of Sciences of Armenia to join it as a full member (receiving the title 'Academician') in the field of Art History.

== Legacy ==
Cafesjian Museum of Art named one of the main exhibition halls after Grigor Khanjyan – Khanjyan Gallery – as it is home to one of his most famous historical paintings – the mural triptych 'History of Armenia'. The Rebirth of Armenia section of the triptych was chosen as a symbolic background for US Secretary of State Hillary Clinton's speech in July 2010.

In 2016 Central Bank of Armenia minted a commemorative coin with Khanjyan's tapestry 'Vardanank'.

== Notable works ==
=== Book Illustrations ===
- Abovian's Wounds of Armenia (1958)
- Sevak's Never-abating Bell Tower (1965)

=== Paintings ===
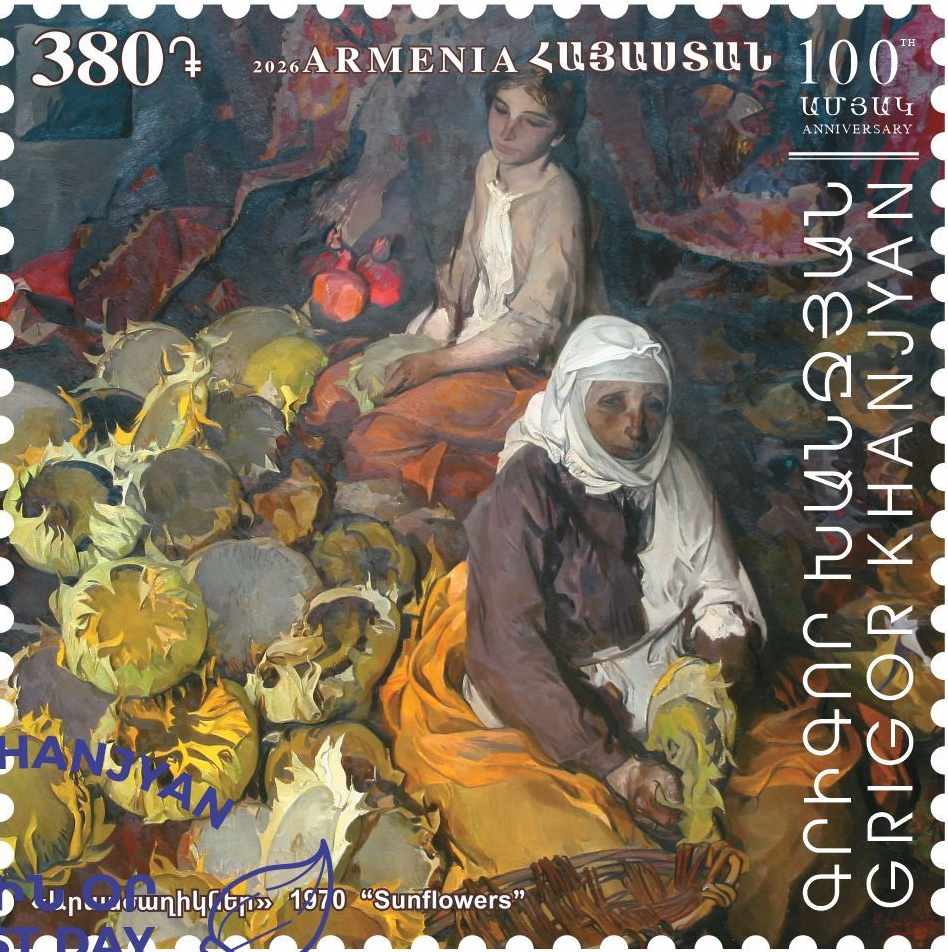
Sunflowers (1970) on a 2026 stamp of Armenia

- In the Painter's Studio (1953)
- Portrait of My Son (1960)
- Sunflowers (1970)
- Twilight (1962)
- Bread of the Highlands (1972)
- Still-life with Sunflowers (1978)

=== Tapestries and Murals ===
- Vardanank
- Creation of Armenian Alphabet
- Rebirth of Armenia

=== Religious ===
- Altarpiece of Etchmiadzin Cathedral
- Altarpiece of the Armenian Cathedral of New York

== Gallery ==
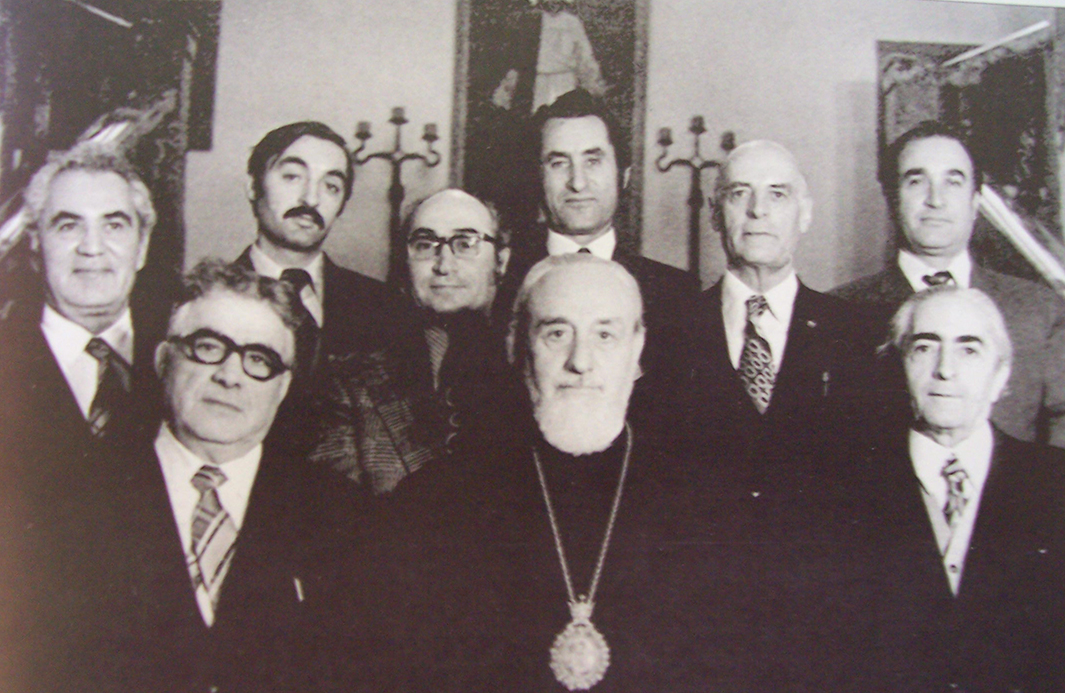
Architectural Commission of the Mother See of Holy Etchmiadzin (1970–1988). First row from left: Varazdat Harutyunyan, Vazgen I, K. Altunyan Second row from left: Baghdasar Arzoumanian, H. Babakhanian, Grigor Khanjyan, A. Galikyan, M. Hovhannisyan
