= Valery Geghamyan =

Ukrainian artist

- Born: May 7, 1925; Garni
- Died: November 11, 2000 (aged 75); Odesa
- Known for: painting, graphic
- Patrons: Martiros Saryan
- Website: www.valeriygeghamyan.com

Valery Arutyunovich Geghamyan (April 7, 1925, Garni, Armenia – September 11, 2000, Odesa, Ukraine) was a Ukrainian artist of Armenian origin, teacher, founder and dean of the art and graphics faculty at the Odesa Pedagogical Institute (1965–1968).

== Biography ==
Born on April 7, 1925, in the Armenian village of Garni. Valery's father, Harutyun Khanagyan, was an actor, a well-known comedian from Yerevan. The father was repressed. Valery's mother came from the old princely family of Ter-Meliksitsian, which was also unsafe in those days. The boy was given the surname Geghamyan, derived from the name of his grandfather, whose name was Gegham.

In the early 1940s he entered the Yerevan Art College. From 1945 to 1951 he studied with Martiros Saryan at the Yerevan Art Institute.

Since 1953, Valery Geghamyan worked as a leading artist in the section of monumental painting at the Art Fund of the USSR in Moscow, which he entered on the recommendation of Saryan.

Since 1957 the artist lived in Birobidzhan, where he taught at the local art school.

In 1958 Valery Geghamyan moved to Makhachkala, where he worked as a teacher of painting, drawing and composition at the senior courses of the Makhachkala Art College named after M. Dzhemala.

From the beginning of the 1960s he lived and worked in Odesa. In 1964 Valery Geghamyan became the founder and dean of the graphic arts faculty at the Odesa Pedagogical Institute, where he worked for more than 20 years, from 1965 to 1988. In this period Valery Geghamyan brought up a lot of famous students, among them there are the realized artists Valentin Zakharchenko, Eugene Rachmanin, Vasiliy Ryabchenko, Oleksandr Rojtburd, Victor Volkov, Oleg Nedoshitko, Sergey Lykov, Ivan Dimov, Vitaly Onishchenko, Oksana and Anatoliy Furlets, Yuri Gorbachev, Viktor Pokydanets, Grigory Sultan and others. Some of his students are also engaged in pedagogical activities, using the experience of their teacher.

Valery Arutyunovich Geghamyan died on September 11, 2000, in Odesa.

In 2001, a memorial exhibition was held at the Odesa Art Museum.

== Work ==
Known as the author of monumental paintings, large thematic cycles and graphic series. He also painted portraits, landscapes and still lifes.
