= Iryna Sushelnytska =

Ukrainian painter and graphic artist

- Сушельницька Ірина Любомирівна
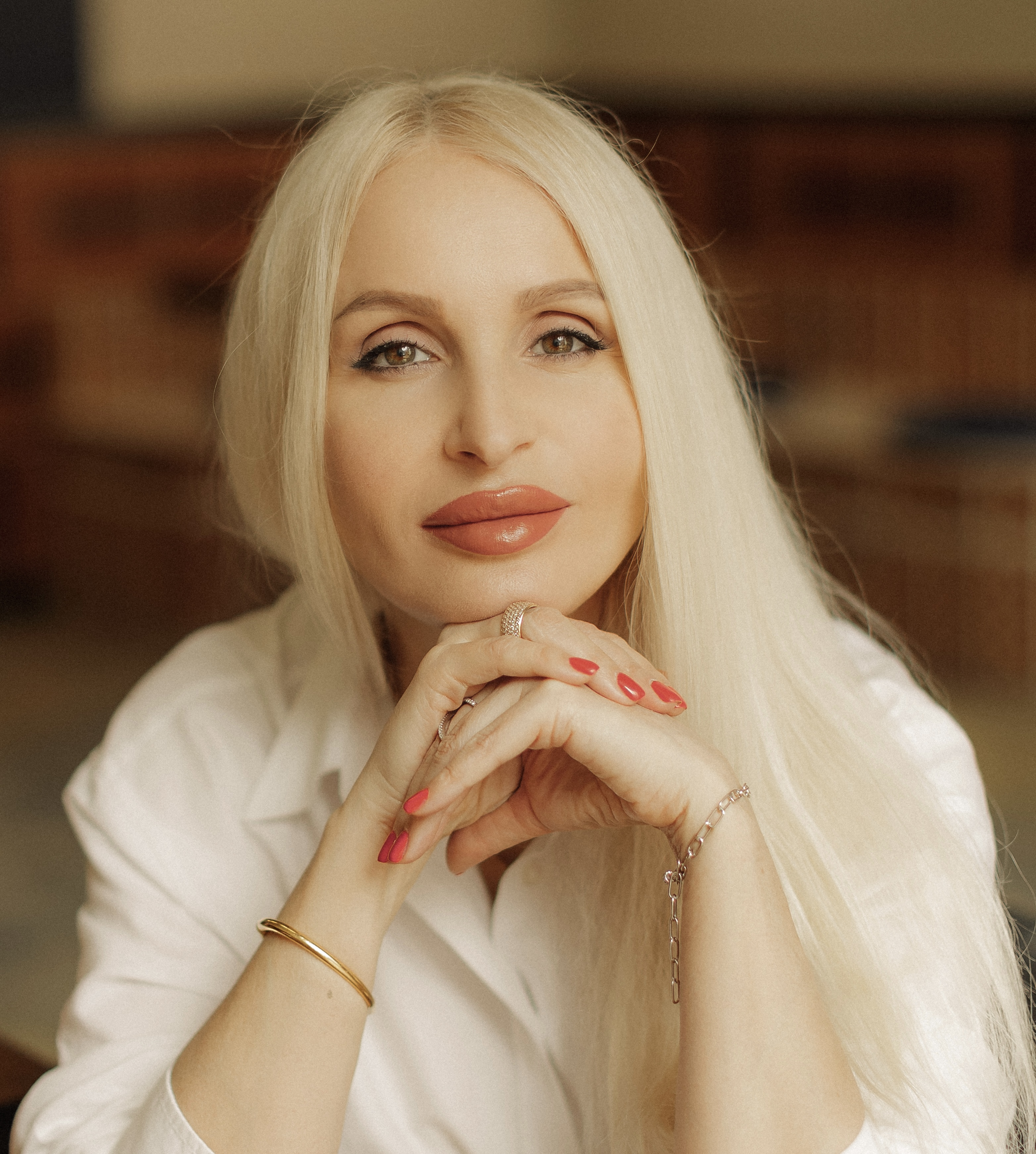
- Iryna Sushelnytska
- Born: January 30, 1976 (age 50); Odesa, Ukraine
- Website: www.sushelnytska.com ...

Iryna Lubomyrivna Sushelnytska (Ukrainian: Сушельницька Ірина Любомирівна; born January 30, 1976) is a Ukrainian painter, graphic artist and sculptor based in Odesa, Ukraine. She holds the title of Honored Artist of Ukraine and is a member of the National Union of Artists of Ukraine. In 2025, she was included in the rating «100 Successful Women of the Odesa Region».

== Education ==
Sushelnytska graduated from the South Ukrainian National Pedagogical University named after K. D. Ushynsky, Faculty of Fine Arts and Graphics, receiving a Master’s degree with distinction.

== Artistic practice ==
Sushelnytska works across a wide range of media including painting, graphics, sculpture, installation, digital art and video art. Her artistic style is based on a sign-symbolic approach that combines traditional and contemporary artistic forms.

Her work addresses themes of identity, social justice, ecology, cultural memory, and the interaction between humans and technological civilization. Her practice shows a strong influence of metamodernism, which allows her to combine elements of classical art with cutting-edge digital media.

Sushelnytska signs her works with several signature variants, including a traditional signature and the monogram ‘’‘SILa’’’, formed from the initials of her surname, first name and patronymic. Each signature is an important element of the identification of her works.

The sign-symbolic style is a characteristic creative hallmark of the artist: she draws the viewer’s attention to certain forms of the external world, interpreting events in a mythopoetic key, similar to the Ukrainian Baroque, which emphasizes the cultural value of Ukrainian identity.

=== War and resilience ===
Despite the full-scale Russian invasion of Ukraine in 2022, Sushelnytska chose to remain in Odesa and continue creating. Japanese international press agency Asia Press described her as an artist who, despite missile strikes on Odesa, stayed in her hometown and continues to create, striving to convey the truth about the war to the global community.

Throughout all of history, artists have used their works to reflect the horrors and tragedies of war, to show how cruelly and mercilessly it kills and destroys. Art helps draw attention to the problems that arise as a result of wars, and promotes peace and understanding between peoples.

— Iryna Sushelnytska

== Selected exhibitions ==
=== International ===
- 2024 — «Les Couleurs Art Gallery», Miami, USA
- 2023 — «D Contemporary Gallery, London, UK
- 2023 — Sorbonne Art Gallery, project «Voice of War», University of Paris Pantheon-Sorbonne, Paris, France
- 2023 — St Andrews, Edinburgh, Glasgow, Scotland
- 2022 — Auction «Save Ukraine», Gallery Exode «Lebanese artists for peace», Beirut, Lebanon
- 2022 — Group exhibition «Ukraine, European Solidarity» «Art of Ukraine»: Constanța, Warsaw, Sofia
- 2022 — Exhibition project «Indestructible Wall» «Supernova. Art of Ukraine», Basel Art Center, Basel, Switzerland

=== Ukraine ===
- 2025 — Solo exhibition of graphic art, painting and textiles, UNION International Cultural Center, Odesa, Ukraine.
- 2023 — Personal exhibition, Center of Contemporary Art of Ukraine «UNION»
- 2023 — Graphic exhibition «CODE», Museum of Western and Eastern Art, Odesa (solo exhibition)
- 2022 — Exhibition of war paintings in Odesa
- 2022 — XI All-Ukrainian Art Exhibition-Competition named after Georgiy Yakutovych, Kyiv
- 2021 — IX All-Ukrainian Triennial «Graphics-2021», Kyiv
- 2021 — UAFRA «Ukrainian Association of Women’s Studies in Art», «Femininity!», Kyiv
- 2021 — International Exhibition-Festival of Contemporary Art «CONNECT», Mykolaiv ART Week

== Recognition ==
Sushelnytska holds the title Honored Artist of Ukraine (2023).
