= Ilya Ilyich Kazas =

Teacher, writer

Ilya Illych Kazas (Russian: Казас, Илья Ильич, Hebrew: אליהו בן אליה קזז: Eliyahu ben Eliya Kazaz) b.11(23) March 1832 Armyansk – d.14(27) January 1912 Yevpatoria, was an outstanding educator, teacher and poet among the Crimean Karaites. Despite coming from a simple family background, he became one of the most prominent members of Crimea's Karaim community in his era. Ilya Kazas was a highly educated man who knew 11 languages, including 4 ancients.

== Biography ==
After graduating from the model Aben-Yashar Lutsk's school and "writing a poem on the majestic language of the Bible" he worked for 6 months as a clerk in one of the most fashionable stores in Odessa.

From 1853 to 1855 Kazas studied at Moscow University, but in October 1855 before completing his studies, he entered the Faculty of Oriental Languages of St. Petersburg University. On September 16, 1859, Kazas graduated from the course, by defending his Ph.D., and became the first of the Crimean Karaites to be educated to that level with a scientific higher education degree.

From St. Petersburg, Kazas moved to Odessa where, in 1859, he opened a private school, working there only for a short time.

In 1863 he moved to Simferopol taking up a position as a history teacher at Simferopol gymnasium №1, where he worked for 18 years. In 1872, Kazas was the author of the project to create Simferopol Tatar Teachers' School. From 1881 to 1894 he worked as an inspector. Furthermore, he held the post of censor the newspaper "Переводчик-Терджиман" (before 1905) and chaired the "Tsar Alexander Karaim Spiritual Academy". His high prestige among the Crimean Karaites is clearly evidenced by the fact that he was an adviser to Hakham S. M. Pampulov.

He has published books such as "לרגל הילדים" ("Guide for children") (written in Hebrew in 1868–1869) and "Russian textbook for elementary schools Tatar", written in 1873–1875.

Ilya Ilyich distinguished himself vividly as a brilliant translator. Thanks to his efforts his contemporary compatriots gained access to many famous literary works, such as "Torat Gaadam" ("Principles of Ethics") and "Kivshono Shel Olam" ("World Secrets"), in which Kazas summarized and processed the works of French authors Paul Janet and Jules Simon.

He edited the Odessa published Karaim Journal "Davul" ("Drum") and Simferopol newspaper "Tauris".

He died in Yalta on 14 January 1912 and was buried in the Yevpatorian Karaim cemetery. The tombstone from the grave of Kazas is located in the lapidarium Karaim Kenesa in Yevpatoria.

== Family ==
He was married to Byubyush Berahovna Pampulova, a cousin of Hakham S. M. Pampulov. Together they had eight children:

- Ilya born July 3, 1860
- Beraha (Boris) – 14 December 1861
- Azari – May 15, 1865
- Anne – 13 December 1867
- Mordechai (Mark) – 18 July 1870
- Michael – 21 May 1872
- Emanuel – January 31, 1875 r
- Sarah – 21 February 1876

== Publications ==
- Harp David verses // Karaim life. – Moscow, 1911. – Kn. 3–4. (Aug. Sept). – P. 3-4.
- Jewish pogroms in Tauride province // Tauris. – Simferopol, 1881. – № 61.
- Karaims, their rituals and doctrine // Tauride Provincial Gazette. – Simferopol, 1869. – № 8.
- To friends: poems / per. KA // Karaim life. – Moscow, 1911. – Kn. 3–4. (Aug. Sept). – S. 5.
- Kivshono Shel Olam, i.e. "World Secrets" (by Jules Simon). Arguments about God's providence and immortality: On HEB. lang. – Yevpatoria: type. ML Murovanskogo 1899.
- Leregel Gayladim. Textbook Hebrew Tatar translation. – Odessa, 1868. – Part I; 1868 – Charles II.
- Measures to maintain Calais // News Taurian scientific archival commission. – Simferopol, 1890. – № 10. – ss. 61–73.
- On the lack of education of the Karaims and the need for opening the spiritual Karaim school // Tauris. – Simferopol, 1881. – №№ 31, 32
- Last wish: // verses Karaim life. – Moscow, 1911. – Kn. 3–4. (Aug. Sept). – P. 4.
- Talisiz // Yeni Terdzhiman. – Bakhchisarai, 10.11.1917. – № 197.
- Torat Gaadam or start Ethics (by Jean Paul): On HEB. lang. – Warsaw, 1889
- Fenelon and his essay "On the education of girls": This, said. on the gatherings. Simfero act. wives. Gymnasium on August 30. 1884 Ven. Pedagogy I. Kazas. – Simferopol: Tavrich. lips. type., 1885. – 66 p.
- Emet Meerets, i.e. "The truth of the earth." Extract from the work of Vigouroux, "The Bible and the latest discoveries in Palestine, Egypt and Assyria": On HEB. lang. – Odessa, 1908. – Vol. 1.
- Are Karaims Jews? // Novorossiysk Telegraph. – Odessa, 04.16.1869. – Annex to the number 63.
- Word Protection // Novorossiysk Telegraph. – Odessa, 19.01.1869 (№ 9); Odessa, 22.01.1869 (№ 10).
- Karaim population of New Russia // Odessa Herald. – Odessa, 1880. – № 9.
- Oł dor ... // Karaj Awazy. – Łuck, 1931. – №2. – S. 34.
- General notes about the Karaims // Karaim life. – Moscow, 1911. – Kn. 3–4. (Aug. Sept). – S. 37–71.
- Short practical Russian language textbook for elementary schools Tatar / Comp. I. Kazas. Dep. 12. – Odessa: the type. P. Frantsova, 1873–1875. – 2 tons.
- Short practical Russian language textbook compiled for elementary schools Tauride province Tatar former inspector Simferopol Tatar school teacher's J. Kazas / Trans. in the cauldron. adverb Maksudov. – Kazan: type. BL Dombrowski, 1900. – 60 s.
- Practical textbook for Hebrew schools Karaim / Comp. Inspector Alexander. Karaim. spirits. UCH-conductive J. Kazas. – Yevpatoria: type. Murovanskogo M., 1896. – [4], IV, 282 p.
- Russian primer for the Tatar national schools / Comp. I. Kazas. – Odessa: the type. P. Frantsova, 1870. – 30 s.

== Sources ==
- Sigaeva GV Crimean Karaites and their contribution to the multinational culture of Russia and Crimea. // Culture of the peoples of the Black Sea: Scientific journal. – Simferopol, 1997. – № 3 – September.
- Barash Ya teacher, educator, poet Ilya Ilyich Kazas / 1833–1912 /. // History in Faces. – Symphonic .: "ANOONK", 1997.
- Prokhorov DA I. J. Kazas – editor of "Tauris" // MAIET. Simferopol, 2002. Vol. IX.
- Prokhorov DA Scientific and regional studies I. Kazas // Ethnography of Crimea XIX-XX centuries. and modern ethno-cultural processes: Materials and Research. Simferopol, 2002, pp 372–379.
- Prokhorov DA II Kazas – Inspector Simferopol Tatar teachers' school // MAIET. Simferopol, 2003, Vol. X.
- Prokhorov DA system of public education Karaims Tauride province in the second half of XIX – early XX centuries. // MAIET. Simferopol, 2006. Vol. XIII.
- Sarach MS, Yuri Alexandrovich Polkanov representatives Karaims: // Karaim intellectuals popular encyclopedia. – Moscow: OOO "Tortuga Club", 1998. – T. 4. – S. 113. – ISBN 5-201-14258-3.
