= Arahmaiani =

Indonesian artist (born 1961)

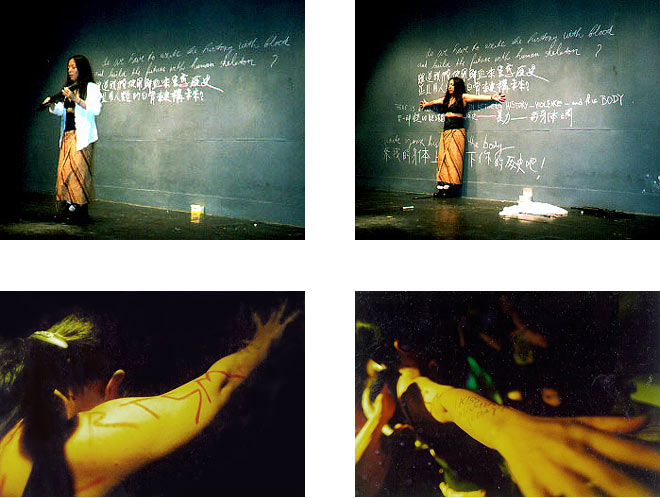
- Stills from Arahmaiani's performance His-Story, 2000/2001
- Born: Arahmayani Feisal; May 21, 1961 (age 65); Bandung, West Java, Indonesia
- Education: Bandung Institute of Technology; Academie voor Beeldende Kunst, Enschede; Paddington Art School, Sydney
- Known for: Performance art, installation art, community-based art
- Notable work: Newspaper Man (1981); Lingga-Yoni (1993); Etalase (1994); Sacred Coke (1995); His-Story (2000); Flag Project (2006–present)
- Movement: Contemporary art, feminist art

Arahmaiani (Arahmayani Feisal; born May 21, 1961) is an Indonesian artist born in Bandung and based in Yogyakarta, Central Java, Indonesia. Arahmaiani is considered by many to be one of the most respected and iconic contemporary artists, specifically in pioneering performance art in Southeast Asia. Arahmaiani frequently uses art as a means of critical commentary on social, religion, gender and cultural issues.

== Early life and education ==
Arahmaiani was born in Bandung, Indonesia on May 21, 1961. Her father was an Islamic scholar and her mother is of Javanese Hindu-Buddhist Extraction. Her name represents the syncretic mixture of two different cultures that she experienced in her upbringing. As she readily explains that "Arahma" goes back to the Arabic word meaning "loving“ while "iani/yani“ comes from a Hindi word meaning "human being“. As a child, Feisal was ambitious about growing up to become a prophet. When revealing her aspirations to her father, he quickly dismissed her, noting that, "only men can be prophets."

As an art student she felt let down by the educational system in her country because it did not connect her with real life. So she decided to create her own art on the streets and discovered in an intuitive way what performance art was all about. Feisal's indignation of Indonesia's academic system and its dismissal of art studies eventually lead to her departure from her home country in the early 1980s. She would later utilize this underlying disdain for Indonesia's academic practices through her performative artwork.

Although many refer to Arahmaiani as a feminist artist, Feisal does not accept this label, stating that, "The feminist label, without any further contextualization, would not encapsulate the multidimensionality of the work, which itself reflects the complex interweaving between class, culture, religion and the natural environment in Indonesia and elsewhere."

Arahmaiani studied at the Faculty of Fine Art and Design, Bandung Institute of Technology and finished her study in 1992. She also went to the Academie voor Beeldende Kunst, Enschede, the Netherlands in 1983 and Paddington Art School, Sydney, Australia in 1985.

== Works ==
Though best known as a performance artist, she also employs painting, drawing, sculpture, video, poetry, dance, and installation. The thematic material of Arahmaiani's work deals with certain issues related to the discrimination and violence against women, the oppression of women's bodies by men, religion in modern society, Western commercial imperialism, and global industrialization. Since the early 1980s, Arahmaiani's works have generated hostility on the part of Islamic community leaders and political authorities resulting in her short imprisonment in 1983.

Rooted in her rejection of Indonesia's limited scope of academics and concern of "how images of mass culture had shaped most Indonesians' worldview", her well-noted work, titled Newspaper Man (1981), showed Arahmaiani wrapped head-to-toe in newspaper advertisements while she walked down the streets and into malls of Badung.

Her painting titled Lingga-Yoni (1993) and her installation titled Etalase (1994), bring together disparate symbols of Islam, Western culture, and sexuality. Etalase consisted of objects such as the Quran, a Buddha statue, a mirror, a pack of condoms, a Coca-Cola bottle, a box of soil, a fan, a small rebana (traditional tambourine) and her photo placed in the same museum vitrine display case. Both of the works have generated a very strong reaction from members of a Muslim fundamentalist group during their first display in Jakarta, Indonesia in 1994. Similarly, another performance given by Feisal in 1995, titled Sacred Coke, surrounded the use of Coca-Cola bottles to represent issues of Americanization and commodification. The works were immediately censored and Arahmaiani herself received death threats which then led her to leave the country to Australia temporarily. Because of the poor condition of the original Lingga-Yoni, Arahmaiani made a new version of the painting for the exhibition at the Herbert F. Johnson Museum of Art in 2013.

At one point in her life, Arahmaiani was working for one of the largest newspapers in Central Java. For four years, she worked as a columnist and often brought up critical issues about the practice of Islamic culture before being fired for criticizing Islam. In a 2014 interview, Arahmaiani stated that coming from a mixed of Muslim, Hindu, Buddhist and Animist background, she wanted to make some sort of contribution to the conversation.

Arahmaiani exhibited in the Indonesian pavilion at the 50th Venice Biennale in 2003, along with other prominent Indonesian artists, Dadang Christianto, Tisna Sanjaya and Made Wianta. The presentation was titled Paradise Lost: Mourning of the World.

== Exhibitions ==
Arahmaiani's work has been exhibited widely throughout the world at venues such as Australian Centre for Contemporary Art, Melbourne; Hokkaido Asahikawa Museum of Art, Japan; Lasalle-SIA College of the Arts, Singapore; Der Rest Der Welt, Pirmasens, Germany; World Social Forum; Impakt, Utrecht, Netherlands; Singapore Art Museum; and Asia-Australia Arts Centre, Sydney. Several major exhibitions she has participated are: the landmark exhibition at Asia Society in New York City, titled Traditions/Tensions in 1996; Jakarta International Performance Art Festival Jakarta, Indonesia in 2000 where she first performed the performative piece titled His-Story; Global Feminisms, at the Brooklyn Museum in 2007; Suspended Histories, at the Museum Van Loon in Amsterdam, the Netherlands from 2013 to 2014; Women in Between: Asian Women Artists 1984–2012 at the Mie Prefectural Art Museum, Japan in 2013, and including also several other major exhibitions in Singapore and Australia.

She has participated in several art biennale such as: Yogyakarta Biennale, Indonesia in 1994; Asia-Pacific Triennial, Brisbane, Australia in 1996; Havana Biennale, Cuba in 1997;Biennale de Lyon, France in 2000; Werkleitz Biennale, Germany in 2000; Performance Biennale, Israel in 2001; Gwangju Biennale, South Korea in 2002; Bienal de São Paulo, Brazil in 2002; Venice Biennale, Italy in 2003; Biennale of the Moving Image, Geneva in 2003;. Additionally, she has held international performances in Australia, Brazil, Cuba, Germany, Indonesia, Japan, Spain, Sweden, and the U.S.A.

Arahmaiani had a solo exhibition in New York in 2014 at Tyler Rollins Fine Art bearing the title Fertility of the Mind which presented the first ever survey of over 30 years of her performance work. And in 2016, as a follow-up to that exhibition, she had Shadow of the past, her first solo exhibition to showcase her ongoing experiences in Tibet. In 2017–2018, her painting Lingga-Yoni (1994) was included in Art Turns. World Turns. Exploring the Collection of the Museum of Modern and Contemporary Art in Nusantara, the inaugural exhibition of Museum MACAN in Jakarta.

== Collections ==
Arahmaiani's work has been collected by several museums and art institutions such as: The Brooklyn Museum, New York; The Herbert F. Johnson Museum of Art, New York; Museum of Modern and Contemporary Art in Nusantara (MACAN), Jakarta; Asia Society, New York, USA.; Singapore Art Museum, Singapore
