= Museum Rudana =

Art museum in Peliatan, Bali, Indonesia

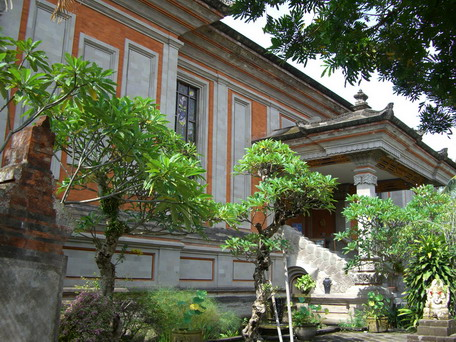
- Established: 11 August 1995
- Location: Peliatan, Gianyar Regency, Bali Indonesia
- Coordinates: 8°31′47″S 115°16′17″E
- Founder: Nyoman Rudana
- Website: museumrudana.com

Museum Rudana (Balinese script: ᬫᬸᬲᬾᬬᬸᬫ᭄ᬭᬸᬤᬦ) or Rudana Art Museum is an art museum in Peliatan, Gianyar Regency, Bali, Indonesia. It was built by Nyoman Rudana, following the concept of the Bali humanist philosophy of Tri Hita Karana, where art makes a contribution to public wellbeing.

== History ==
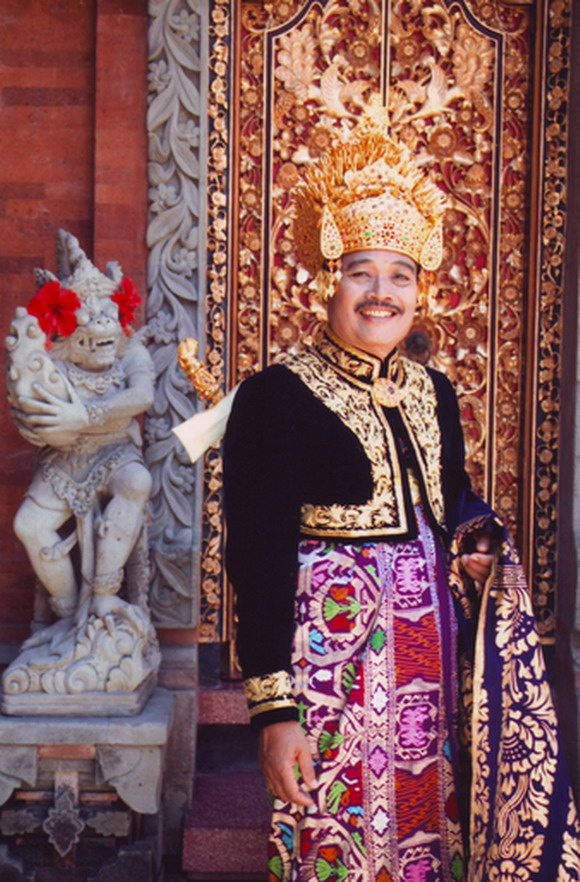
Nyoman Rudana, founder of Museum Rudana

The 500 square meter building was built on 2.5 acres (10,000 m^{2}) of land, and its cornerstone was laid on December 26, 1995.

Its blessing ceremony was held on August 11, 1995 as part of the commemoration of the 50th Anniversary of Indonesian Independence with its Golden Indonesian Spirit. President Suharto officially opened it on December 26, 1995.

== Architecture ==
The Gate of Museum Rudana

Nyoman Rudana designed the building, which is three stories tall and built using Balinese architecture and philosophical artifacts. Tri Angga, the three parts of a human body: the head, trunk, and legs; Tri Manggala, the division of a compound into 3 sections: the inner, middle, and outer sections; Tri Loka, the concept of the universe which is divided into bur, bwah, swah: the worlds beneath, intermediate and above.

The outer walls of the museum reflect the national flag of Indonesia: red and white. The red part is made up of red bricks and the white is made up of sandstone.

== Collections ==
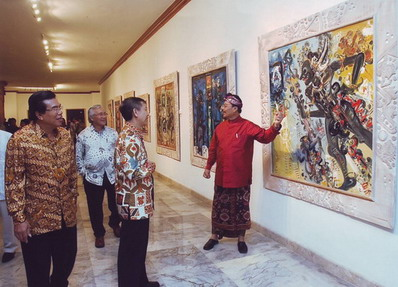
Nyoman Rudana at the Opening of Modern Indonesian Masters Painting Exhibitions on 16 August 2007.

Museum Rudana exhibits more than 400 pieces of fine art and sculpture made by various Indonesian artists. The arrangement of paintings aims to represent a harmony of style in line with the philosophical concept of the building.

On the first and second floor, works of modern Indonesian artists are displayed, including works by Affandi, Basuki Abdullah, Srihadi Soedarsono (best known for his series of Borobudur paintings), Nyoman Gunarsa, and Made Wianta. The works of post-modern Indonesian artists such as Nyoman Erawan and Made Budhiana are also presented. Museum Rudana also has paintings depicting temples in Indonesia such as Besakih in Bali, and Prambanan in Central Java.

On the third floor, various traditional works of traditional Balinese masters from Ubud and Batuan are exhibited, including works by I Gusti Nyoman Lempad and I Gusti Ketut Kobot.

The museum also exhibits the works of foreign artists who reside in Bali, including Don Antonio Blanco (Spain), Yuri Gorbachev (Russia), Jafar Islah (Kuwait) and Iyama Tadayuki (Japan).

== Exhibitions ==
Museum Rudana held a painting exhibition in Kuwait, May 1998

Museum Rudana has held exhibitions overseas. In 1997 and 1998, while Indonesia was affected by the 1997 Asian financial crisis, it held exhibitions in Kuwait City, Kuwait and in Rome, Italy in 2000, where Nyoman Rudana received the L’albero dell’umanita (The Tree of Humanity) award from the Italian government.

Regular exhibitions are held several times a year, with the biggest one usually taking place in August as a commemoration of its anniversary. The 4th anniversary in 1999 and the 8th in 2004 were commemorated by presenting The Ksatria Seni Awards to fellow artists who dedicated their works for the development of the Indonesian arts.

== Bibliography ==
- Mann, Richard, 2006. Treasures of Bali – A Guide to Museums in Bali. Gateway Books International, UK. ISBN 979-99853-4-X
- August 2007, Museum Rudana Buletin (issued commemorating the 12th Anniversary of Museum Rudana).
