= Gymnasium 9 (Simferopol) =

9th Simferopol Gymnasium
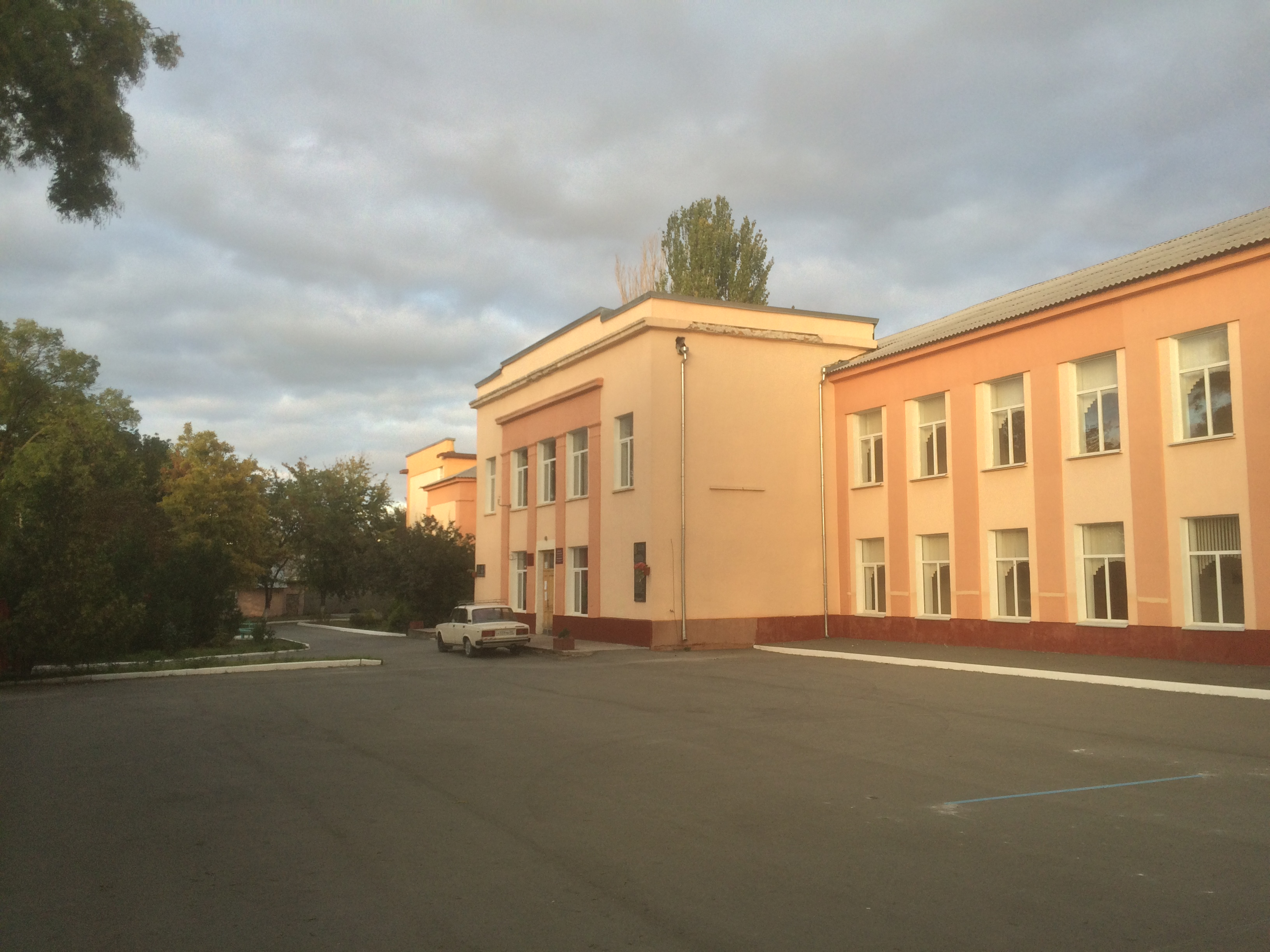

Location
- 34, Tambovskaya St., Simferopol, Crimea; 44.9345°N 34.0950°E

Information
- Type: Gymnasium with the profound study of English
- Founded: 1917; 109 years ago
- Principal: Tatiana Ivanova
- Enrollment: 750
- Language: English; German; French
- Website: 9.simedu.ru

The Gymnasium No. 9 named after Valentin Karlov (Russian: Гимназия № 9 имени В. А. Карлова), commonly known as Gymnasium No. 9, is a public secondary school located in Simferopol, Crimea. Founded in 1917, the school operates as a gymnasium specializing in foreign languages, particularly the English language. In February 2024, by a unanimous decision of the Simferopol City Council, the gymnasium was named in honor of its alumnus, military aviator and Hero of the Soviet Union Valentin Karlov.

== History ==
The school was founded in 1917 and was at the time a private educational institution. It was owned by a married couple of teachers, the Zhirovs, and 20 pupils studied there. Due to certain difficulties, the school was obliged to change its location and move in 1935 to the building of the former gymnasium for girls. In 1934 the school appeared at the exhibition of experimental schools in Moscow, and received a favourable verdict. With the beginning of the Great Patriotic War of 1941–45 many of its teachers and students went to the front. The name of those who died have been immortalized on the commemorative plaque.

== Present ==
At present, some 770 pupils study in the school. English (profound study), German (second foreign language) and French (optional) are taught. In 2000, the tradition of organizing summer language camps was renewed. Camps like these had been organized in the 1970s on the basis of boarding houses on the southern coast of Crimea. Currently the work of the camps is overseen by native speakers. Students of the gymnasium regularly win I-IV levels of the all-Ukrainian pupil Olympiad in English (IV level - twice). They also make reports at the annual theoretical and practical conferences hosted by the Crimean Institute of Business.

Gymnasium 9 serves a basis for frequent conferences for foreign language teachers organized by the Crimean In-Service Teacher Training Institute (KRIPPO). Teachers of Gymnasium 9 offer demo lessons and workshops for their colleagues.

Since 1999 the Gymnasium has been cooperating with US Peace Corps in Ukraine (teachers Erica Martin in 2000, Alison Stohr in 2007 and Adrianne Kleine in 2010).

== Identity ==
- Some aspects of English ("Guides and Interpreters") are taught using the gymnasium teachers' own elaborations (author's courses)
- The annual Foreign Language week traditionally ends with a theatrical performance "At the English Fire-place"
- Organizing summer language camps (see)
- Students of the school correspond with Queen Elizabeth II

== Principals of the school ==
The school's principals have been recorded by the museum archives of Gymnasium No. 9:

- Sergey Pavlovich Brusentsov (appointed in 1935)
- Petr Abramovich Medvedev (1960s)
- Klavdia Petrovna Lebedeva (1970–1983)
- Liudmila Leonidovna Zginnik (1983–2004)
- Tatiana Valerievna Koval (April 2004 – November 2014)
- Tatiana Vasilievna Ivanova (November 2014 – present)

== See also ==
- 1st Gymnasium (Simferopol)
