= Arpenik Nalbandyan =

Soviet-Armenian artist (1916–1964)

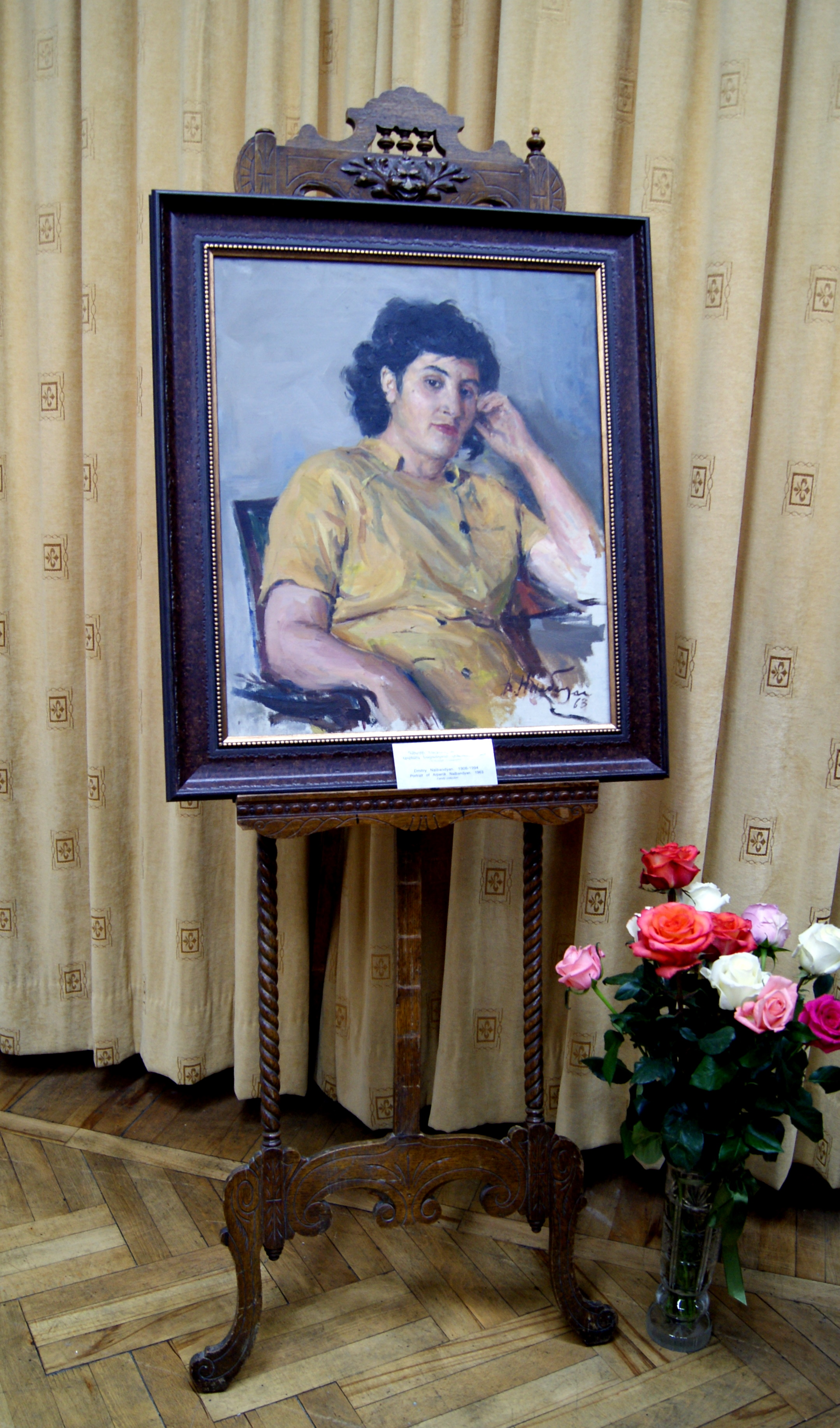
- Self portrait exhibited at the National Gallery of Armenia
- Born: December 23, 1916; Tbilisi, Georgia
- Died: May 17, 1964 (aged 47); Yerevan
- Known for: Fine Art
- Awards: Honorary Artist of the Armenian SSR

Arpenik Nalbandyan (Armenian: Արփենիկ Նալբանդյան, December 23, 1916 – May 17, 1964) was a Soviet-Armenian artist.

== Biography ==
Arpenik Nalbandyan was born on 23 December 1916 in Tbilisi. From 1935 to 1941 she studied painting at the Tbilisi State Academy of Arts, Georgia. Nalbandyan became a member of the Armenian Artists Union in 1943. In 1946 she started to teach at the Yerevan Institution of Fine Arts and Theater. In 1948 and 1952 she was elected as deputy of City Council. In 1956 she was awarded the "Honored worker" medal, and 1957 she was appointed to teach in Moscow. In 1961 she became Honorary Artist of the Armenian SSR.

Arpenik Nalbandyan died on 17 May 1964 in Yerevan.

== Exhibitions ==
She participated in exhibitions in her home republic and in other parts of the USSR.

- 1942 "The Red Army heroism", Yerevan
- 1943 Reporting exhibition, Artist's house, Yerevan (solo exhibition)
- 1948 38 works, Artist's house, Yerevan (solo exhibition)
- 1967 Artist's house, Yerevan (solo exhibition)
- 1988 Portrait exhibition, Yerevan
- 2001 Albert and Tove gallery, YSA of Fine Arts (solo exhibition)
- 2016 Solo exhibition on the 100th anniversary of Arpenik Nalbandyan at the National Gallery of Armenia

== Family ==
- Brother - Dmitry Nalbandyan, people's painter of the USSR, an actual member of The Academy of Fine Arts of the USSR.
- Husband - Eduard Isabekyan, people's painter of Armenia, professor. They married in 1940.
- Sons:
  - Mher Isabekyan - painter
  - Aram Isabekyan - painter, rector of the Yerevan State Academy of Fine Arts, professor

== Works ==
She has composed in the field of easel paintings. The works are prominent for their acute observation and delicate lyricism. Her paintings (around 300) can be found at the National Gallery of Armenia (around 45), the Georgian National Gallery, the Gyumri Gallery, and in private collections.

=== Portraits ===
- "Self Portrait", 1942
- "The girl" - 1957
- "Mery Kochar's portrait", 1960, ANG
- "Mom Ovsanna", 1962
- "H. Hovhannisyan", 1963

=== Household paintings ===
- "In meditations", 1939
- "At the source", 1957
- "The gammer from Voskevaz", 1958

=== Landscape paintings ===
- "Akhtala", 1943
- "Autumn landscape", 1953
- "Khndzoresk", 1962

== Medals and awards ==
- "Honored worker" medal, 1956
- The People's Painter of Armenia, 1961.

== External sources ==
- Arpenik Nalbandyan
- Artists, Arpenik Nalbandyan
- Le Musée des Arts de l՚Arménie (Composition et introduction de N. Mazmanian) – Leningrad, Aurore, 1975, p. 94
- Armenian women artists 2000 – Armenian Culture Foundation (calendar)
- Arpenik Nalbandyan 100 (Author Hasmik Badalyan) – catalogue, Yerevan, 2016
