= Konstantin Ushinsky =

Russian pedagogue

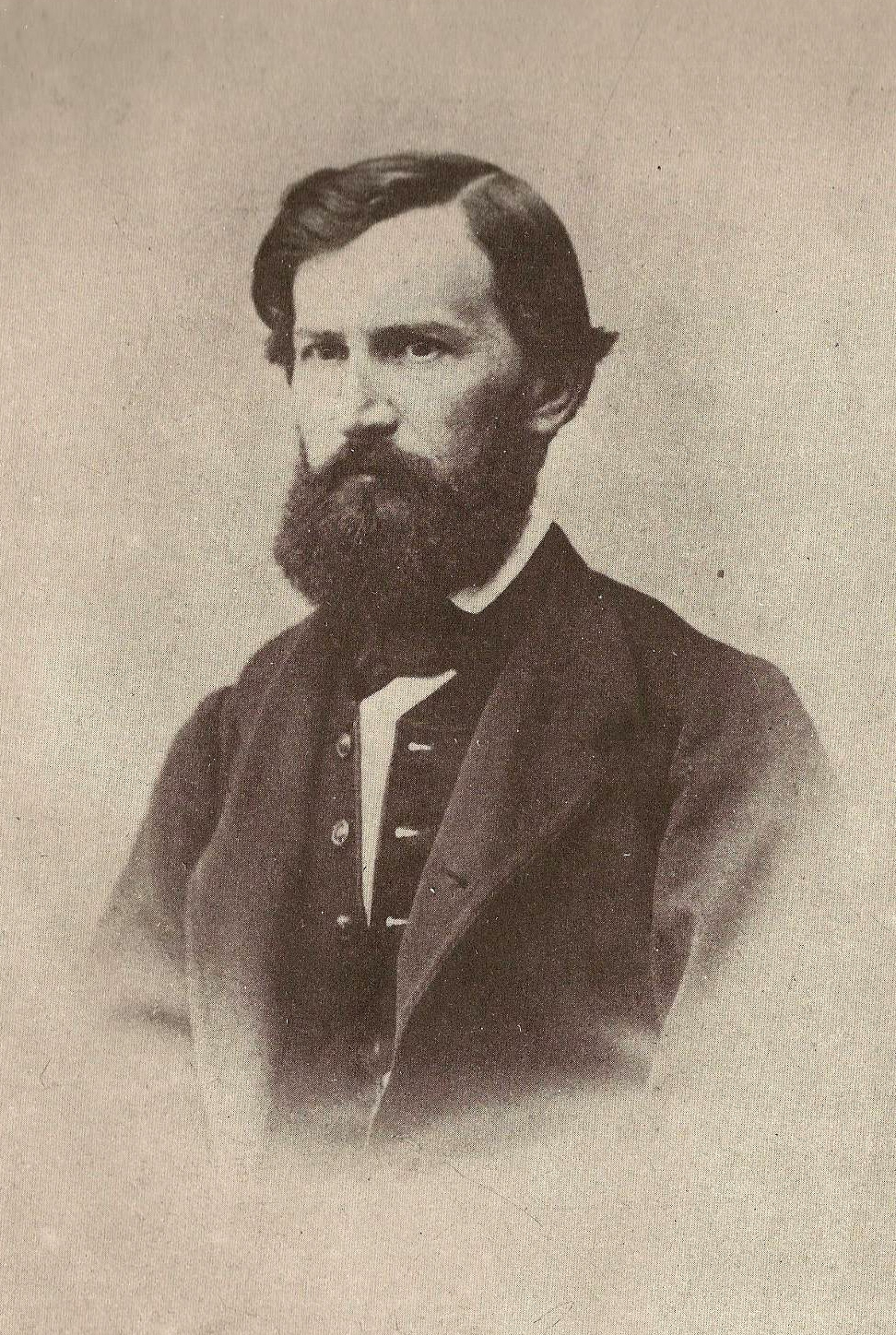
Konstantin Ushinsky

Konstantin Dmitrievich Ushinsky (Russian: Константи́н Дми́триевич Уши́нский) (2 March [O.S. 18 February] 1823 – 3 January 1871 [O.S. 22 December]) was a Russian teacher and writer, credited as the founder of scientific pedagogy in the Russian Empire.

== Biography ==
Konstantin Ushinsky was born in Tula to the family of a retired officer. Soon the family moved to Novgorod-Severskiy (present-day Novhorod-Siverskyi, Ukraine) where Konstantin's father was appointed an uezd judge. In 1844 Ushinsky graduated from the Department of Law of Moscow University. From 1846 to 1849 he was a professor at the Demidov Lyceum in Yaroslavl but was forced to leave the position because of his liberal views.

The unemployed Ushinsky earned money by literary work for the magazines Sovremennik and Biblioteka dlya Chteniya. After a year and a half he managed to get a position as a minor bureaucrat in the Department for Foreign Religions. Ushinsky referred to his job at the time as "the most boring position possible."

In 1854 Ushinsky became a teacher of Russian Literature and Law at the Gatchina Orphanage (Gatchinsky Sirotsky Institut). In 1855-1859 he became the Inspector at the same institution. There was a lucky incident during his inspectorship: he discovered two sealed-off bookcases untouched for more than twenty years, which held the library of Pestalozzi's pupil Hugel. This discovery strongly influenced Ushinsky's interest in theoretical pedagogy.

In 1859-1862 Ushinsky was the Inspector of the Smolny Institute of Noble Maidens in Saint-Petersburg, In 1860-1862 he also worked as the Chief Editor of the Journal of the Department of Education (Zhurnal Ministerstva Narodnago Obrazovaniya). Following a conflict with the Department of Education, Ushinsky was forced to go abroad to study school organizations in Switzerland, Germany, France, Belgium and Italy (1862-1867). The position was perceived by many as an honorary exile.

At the end of his life Ushinsky mostly acted as a writer and publicist. Together with Nikolay Ivanovich Pirogov he may be considered as an author of the liberal reforms of the 1860s. Emancipated peasants needed schools, the schools needed teachers and textbooks. He demanded compulsory universal education for both boys and girls. Ushinsky was also an ardent promoter of national traditions in schools.

Ushinsky spent a lot of time and effort in debates over the most convenient ways to organize teachers' seminaries. He also wrote textbooks focused on teaching children how to read: Detski mir (Children's world), "the Russian equivalent of America's McGuffy Reader," and the primer Rodnoe slovo ([Our] native language, 1864). More than 10 million of Ushinsky's books, including 187 editions of Rodnoe slovo, were printed before the October Revolution.

Ushinsky died in Odesa in 1870 and was buried in Kiev.

== Works ==
Ushinsky's magnum opus was his theoretical work The Human As a Subject of Education: Pedagogical Anthropology in three volumes, started in 1867. In it he argued that the subject of education is a person, so it is impossible to achieve results in education without using the results of the "anthropological sciences": philosophy, political economy, history, literature, psychology, anatomy, physiology. According to Ushinsky, "Pedagogical experience without science is equivalent to witchcraft in medicine." Among his innovations was the new "Analytic-Synthetic Phonetic Method" for learning reading and writing, which is still the main method used in Russian schools.

== Memorials ==
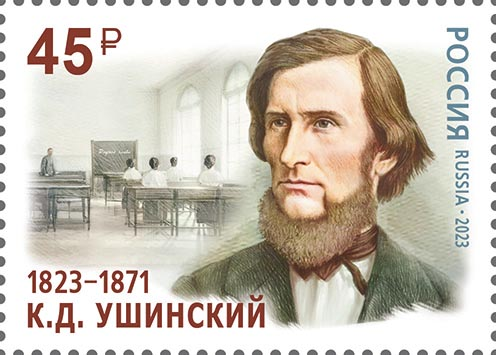
Ushinsky on a 2023 stamp of Russia

Educational institutions named after Konstantin Ushinsky:

- South Ukrainian National Pedagogical University in Odesa, Ukraine
- Yaroslavl State Pedagogical University in Yaroslavl, Russia
- 1st Simferopol Gymnasium in Simferopol, Crimea, Ukraine
- Novgorod-Siversky gymnasium in Novgorod-Siversky, Chernigiv, Ukraine
