= Tereza Mirzoyan =

Armenian sculptor (1922-2016)

Tereza Gaikovna Mirzoyan
- Born: 11 August 1922
- Died: 7 August 2016 (aged 93)

Tereza Gaikovna Mirzoyan (Armenian: Թերեզա Միրզոյան; 11 August 1922 in Kirovokan, Soviet Union – 7 August 2016 in Yerevan, Armenia) was an Armenian sculptor. A member of the Artists' Union of the USSR, she was an Honored Artist of the Armenian SSR (1967) and Honored Art Worker of the Armenian SSR (1986), as well as a teacher and professor.

== Life and work ==
Mirzoyan was born on 11 August 1922 in Kirovokan in Soviet Armenia (today the Lori Province of Armenia). In 1946, she graduated from Tbilisi Academy of Fine Arts. Since 1949, Mirzoyan was a member of the Union of Artists of the Armenian SSR. Since 1950, she was an active participant in exhibitions of the Union of Artists of Armenia. She has repeatedly exhibited her works abroad.

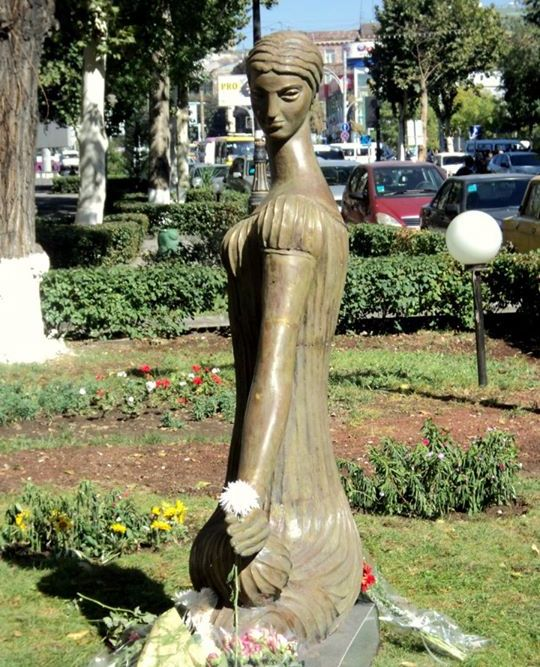
Sculpture "Loves me, loves me not", Yerevan

Mirzoyan is an author of numerous sculptures and monumental works both in Armenia and abroad. When creating sculptural works, she worked with various materials, including marble, bronze, tuff, porcelain, wood, and basalt.

She was awarded with numerous awards, medals, certificates of honor and prizes from the USSR, the Armenian SSR, Armenia and foreign countries.

== Death ==
Tereza Mirzoyan died on 7 August 2016 at the age of 94.

== Pedagogical career ==
Mirzoyan has devoted more than 55 years to teaching at the Art Institute (now the Yerevan State Academy of Fine Arts). Over the years, Mirzoyan contributed to the artistic, professional and moral education of many generations of Armenian sculptors. Among her students are world-famous sculptors and professional teachers. Mirzoyan was a teacher of Armenian sculptor Zaven Koshtoyan.

== Art ==
- Bronze sculpture of the Armenian singer of songs and dances of the peoples of the world A. Baghdasaryan (National Gallery of Armenia, 1951)
- Bust of the Hero of the Soviet Union U. Avetisyan (Yerevan, 1956)
- Bronze bust of the Armenian healer of the XII century Mkhitar Heratsi (Yerevan)
- Sculpture "Loves me, loves me not" (Yerevan)

== Awards ==
- Honored Artist of the Armenian SSR (1967)
- Honored Art Worker of the Armenian SSR (1986)
- Medal "For Labor Merit" (1956)
