= Yuri Gorbachev =

Russian painter and sculptor (born 1948)

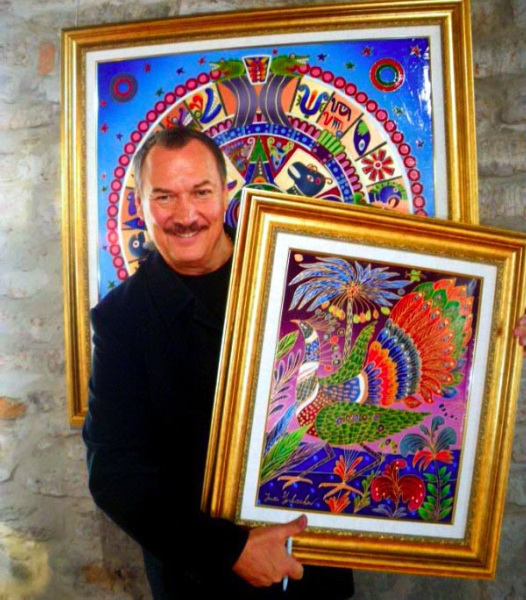
- Born: December 29, 1948 (age 77); USSR
- Known for: Painting, sculpture

Yuri Gorbachev (born December 29, 1948) is a Russian painter and sculptor.

Since 1991, he has lived in the United States and creates in his Manhattan studio in New York City.

Over the last 40 years, Gorbachev's career has reached the highest level of international art. Gorbachev created his own unique technique of painting on canvas, using non-ferrous metals (gold, bronze), special varnishes and enamels, completely removing black from the palette.

== Biography ==
Since his arrival in the United States, Yuri Gorbachev has exhibited his work in more than 250 one-man shows worldwide. Former Christie's Auction House expert in Russian art, Maria Paphiti, calls Gorbachev the ambassador of Russia for world art.

For the past 20 years, Gorbachev has traveled extensively; his artistic development moved from his naive style to his most recent intricate works. He uses a sophisticated technique with precious metals like gold and copper along with specially formulated lacquers over oil on canvas; he never uses black in his palette, leading art critics to call his style "Positivism". In the last years, he has developed a new technique, which highlights his paintings with enamel creating added texture and luster to his composition. The technique, developed over two decades, uses ceramic techniques on canvas.

Gorbachev's work is represented in the personal collection of U.S. President Bill Clinton and U.S. Secretary of State Hillary Clinton; his painting was personally presented in Washington, D.C., on July 22, 1996.

In 2011, Gorbachev was commissioned to design a new label for Stolichnaya Red Vodka, The label he created "Four Elements, by Yuri Gorbache" was based on his painting of the same name. It is destined to become a collector's item and new icon for the brand. This is not the first time Gorbachev has worked with Stolichnaya. In 1994, "Stolichnaya" commissioned Gorbachev to design their annual Christmas "Holiday" advertisement, which appeared in hundreds of magazines around the world, including Art & Antiques, Vanity Fair, Vogue, Time, American Photo, W, GQ, and Elle. It was so successful that every year for the next four years he was commissioned to do a new image for the Holiday ad. Michel Roux, art collector and President of Carillon Importers, Inc. (distributor of Absolut and Stolichnaya vodka) was the person behind the creative advertising of Stolichnaya and Absolut. He used artists including Andy Warhol, Keith Haring and Gorbachev for the famous Absolut Vodka ad campaigns, creating a tradition of using famous artists for vodka advertisements to promote the brands with cultural icons. Roux described Gorbachev as "…the Angel from Russia. He brings out whatever is good from there. The spirit, the subject matter, and the colors of his work - profound in their simplicity - exemplify what Russia is all about." His experiences in Russia and Ukraine, where he spent 20 years of his life before moving to New York, are reflected in his work.

Gorbachev began his career as a Russian ceramics artist making sculptures, bas-reliefs and painting on ceramic plaques, which are displayed in museums and galleries around the world. He arrived in the United States in 1991 with little knowledge of English. Famous for his fine art ceramics in the USSR, he then changed his medium to oil on canvas.

In 1993, Gorbachev's first visit to the Far East showed him his true path as a painter – his connection to the Orient influenced both his style and technique, which transpired in his paintings. Gorbachev incorporated these different worlds and experiences – Russian, American, and Asian – into his art and changed and developed into the artist he is today.

On March 14, 1996, the United Nations honored Yuri Gorbachev with a commission to create an original work in conjunction with the release of the United Nations stamp "Endangered Species". Secretary General Boutros Boutros-Ghali received Gorbachev's rendition of "Green Parrot On Red Flower" at a preview exhibition.

Yuri Gorbachev was classically trained in Soviet art academies and also acquired advanced degrees in philosophy and communication. His most notable accomplishment through his art has been his success in bringing many different cultures together in his own language. His use of lacquer and glazing techniques in his paintings exhibit his classic training and mastery of ceramics. Gorbachev's career has flourished in New York City and he has had solo exhibits all over the United States and Europe.

In 1998, Rizzoli International published a book that compiles Gorbachev's art called "The Art of Yuri Gorbachev". It presents 100 full-color plates divided into thematic sections spanning Gorbachev's career. He is one of few Russian artists to have been published by Rizzoli, along with Marc Chagall and Kazimir Malevich. Bertelsmann Group published "The Art of Paradise", a major book about Gorbachev's life and art, including his ceramics from his early career explaining his symbolism, roots and development as an artist.

Gorbachev has had his work exhibited over the past several years at numerous museums such as the Moscow Museum of Modern Art and the Mora Museum of Russian Art. Brazil's major magazine, Caras, featured Gorbachev as person of the year in its 2006 edition. Gorbachev's exhibit became a cultural phenomenon in San Paulo, with his artwork printed on T-shirts, scarves, clothing and worn by stars like the Rolling Stones, Bono, Jamie Foxx, and others.

Although Gorbachev's art has been acknowledged worldwide and has received numerous prizes and awards, he continues to produce work regarding Russia. In 2010, The St. Petersburg State Museum of Urban Art & Sculpture held an exhibit of Gorbachev's works. The show was a critically acclaimed success.

His painting "Tsar Nicholas and his Family" was added to the Russian Museum of St. Petersburg, Russia.

In an article in The New York Times, journalist Carey Goldberg said "There is no better interview subject than a man who just wants to make people happy. A man so brimming with energy that he repeats and re-repeats words of emphasis, a man with a mission so simple and sweet that it works for Americans and Russians and Indonesians alike. And there is no better art, to my taste, than art that radiates the same kind of joie de vivre so that it acts as a tonic on all those who see it, uplifting not only with its beauty but with an exuberance as potent as the blooming of northern plants in summer."

== Some collectors of Gorbachev's works ==
- Mikhail Gorbachev (first cousin once removed to Yuri), former President of the U.S.S.R.
- Eduard Shevardnadze, former President of Georgia
- Joseph Estrada, former President of the Philippines
- Galyani Vadhana, Princess of Thailand
- Jim Jeffords, U.S. Senator from Vermont
- Mikhail Barishnikov, Latvian-American dancer and actor
- Marcello Mastroianni, Italian film actor
- William Saroyan, Armenian-American author
- Nyoman Rudana, founder of Museum Rudana, Ubud, Bali, Indonesia
