= Simferopol gymnasium No. 1 =

1st Simferopol Gymnasium
- Гімназія №1 ім. Ушинського Сімферопольської міської ради Автономної Республіки Крим
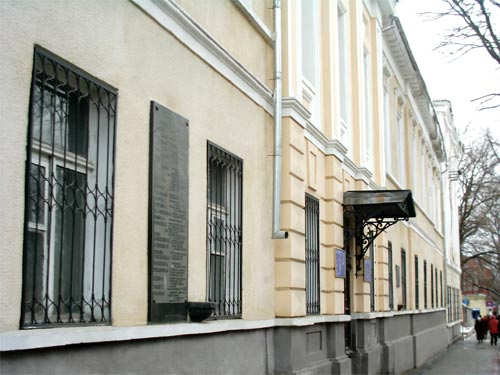
- School building from 1841

Location
- 34, Tambovskaya St., Simferopol, Crimea, 95006.
- Coordinates: 44°57′13″N 34°5′37″E

Information
- Other name: Konstantin Ushinsky Gymnasium No.1 of Simferopol municipality Autonomous Republic of Crimea
- School type: Public, Gymnasium
- Established: 1 September 1812; 213 years ago
- Principal: Igor Kovalyov
- Grades: 1–11
- Enrolment: c. 1200
- Website: gym1.lbihost.ru

Immovable Monument of Local Significance of Ukraine
- Official name: Будинок Сімферопольської першої чоловічої казенної гімназії, де працював Д.І.Менделєєв, вчилися видатні діячі науки і культури (Building of the First Simferopol Men's State Gymnasium, where D. I. Mendeleev worked and prominent figures of science and culture studied)
- Type: Architecture
- Reference no.: 127-АР

The 1st Gymnasium (Simferopol), officially Konstantin Ushinsky Gymnasium No.1 of Simferopol municipality Autonomous Republic of Crimea (Ukrainian: Гімназія №1 ім. Ушинського Сімферопольської міської ради Автономної Республіки Крим), is a secondary school (gymnasium) founded in 1812 in Simferopol, Crimea.

== History ==
Taurida, later renamed the Simferopol gymnasium for boys, was founded in the autumn of 1812 during the reign of Czar Alexander I. Its opening was dictated by the need for middle school children, who had finished lower school courses, to continue their education and prepare for higher education.

During its first year, under the direction of Fedor Petrovich Zаstavski, only 17 pupils attended the gymnasium. However, by 1835 the number rose to about 477.

Events of the Crimean War (1853–1856) had an influence on the life of the gymnasium, and several unoccupied buildings were used as a hospital.

In 1970, a conference of teachers of Taurida province was held, in which Konstantin Ushinsky took part. In memory of this event the gymnasium has its current name.

In 1991 the school became a gymnasium again. Its curriculum was enriched with such subjects as the history of world art, foreign literature, logics. Beginning in the first form, pupils are required to study a foreign language – either English, French, or German; they also study the Ukrainian language. From the 5th form a second foreign language is introduced.

A museum was opened in the gymnasium in 1968 and was awarded an exemplary status in 2004.

Currently, the school is situated in two buildings: the old one, that was built in late 1830s, and the new one.

Gymnasium has a so-called first-level school (primary education), general school of secondary level and gymnasium school, which are attended by about 800 pupils (5–11 classes) of its 1187 pupils.

== Notable alumni ==
- Igor Kurchatov, physicist; leader of the Soviet atomic bomb project; recipient of the Order of Lenin; member of the Russian Academy of Sciences
- Ivan Aivazovsky, Russian painter
- Nikolay Arendt, doctor of medicine; founder of the Russian aeronautics theory and designer of the first glider in the Russian Empire
- Ismail Gasprinskiy, Crimean intellectual, educator, publisher and politician
- Henry Graftio, engineer; constructor of the first trams lines in Saint Petersburg; constructor of hydroelectric power stations (Volhovskaya and Nizhne-Svirskaya)
- Sergey Karjakin, the youngest chess grandmaster in history
- Adolf Ioffe, Soviet diplomat
- Mikhail Chulaki, composer, director of the Bolshoi theatre
- Alexander Spendiarov, composer and conductor
- Gavriil Tikhov, astrobotanist

== Notable teachers ==
- Dmitri Mendeleev, chemist, creator of the periodic table of elements
- Ilya Derkachiv, pedagogue and writer, author of the first Ukrainian language textbook and ABC book
- Ilya Kazas, Crimean educator and poet
- Aleksey Markevich, historian, member of the Russian Academy of Sciences
- Mitrofan Kolosov, philologist, member of the Russian Academy of Sciences

== See also ==
- Gymnasium 9 (Simferopol)
- School of the Future (Yalta)
