= Vruir Galstian =

Armenian painter

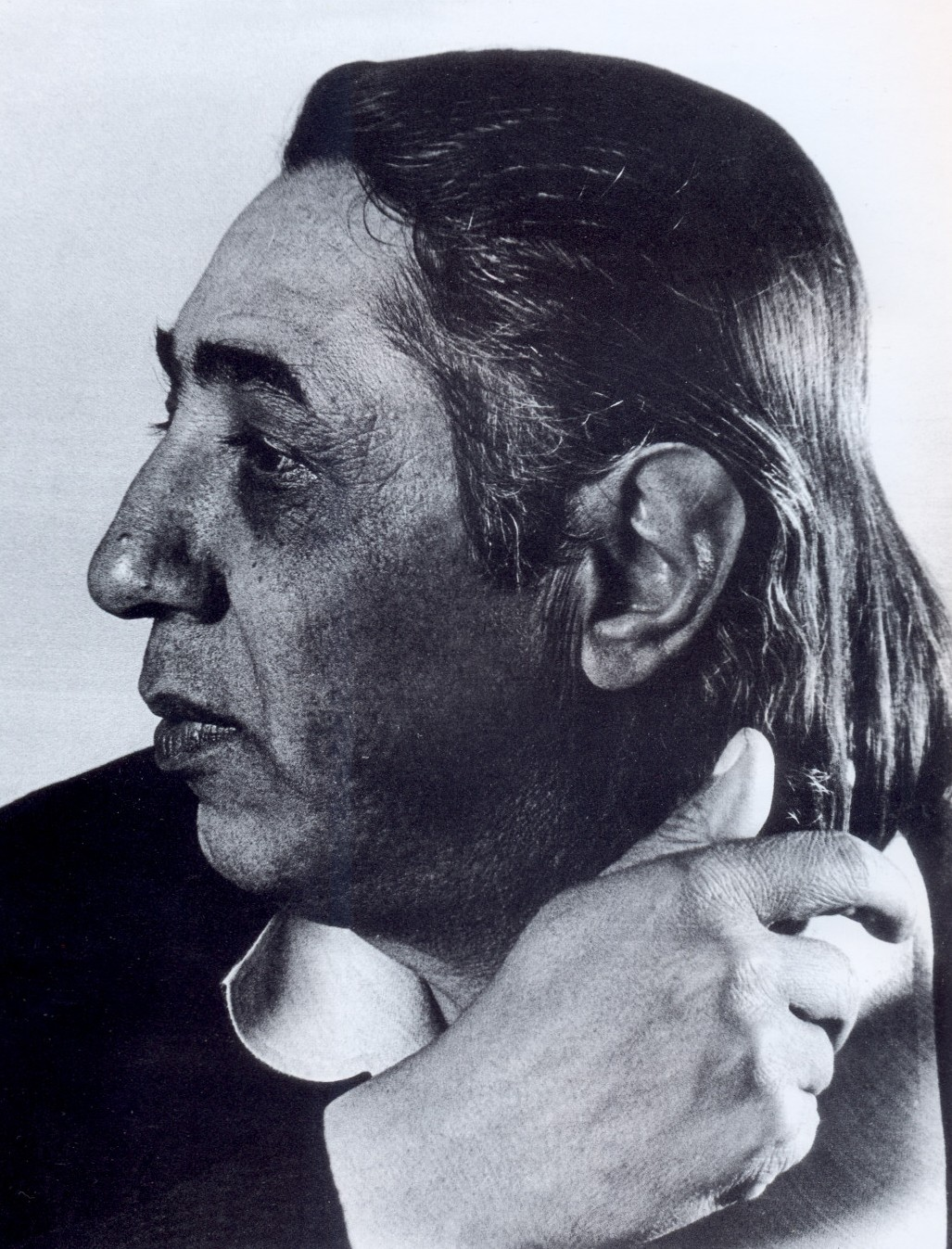
- Born: Vruir Galstian; 3 March 1924; Yerevan, Armenian SSR
- Died: 10 July 1996 (aged 72); Yerevan, Armenia
- Known for: Painter

Vruir Yezekiel Galstian (Armenian: Վրույր Եզեկիելի Գալստյան, March 3, 1924 — July 10, 1996) was an Armenian painter.

== Biography ==
Vruir Galstian was born in 1924, in Yerevan, Armenia. In 1958 he graduated from Panos Terlemezian Art College, Yerevan. From 1959 to 1964 he studied at Yerevan Fine Arts Institute.
Since 1962 he participated in exhibitions both in Armenia, and abroad (Argentina, Portugal, France, Germany, the United States, as well as the countries of the former Soviet Union). He became a member of the Artists' Union of Armenia in 1968.

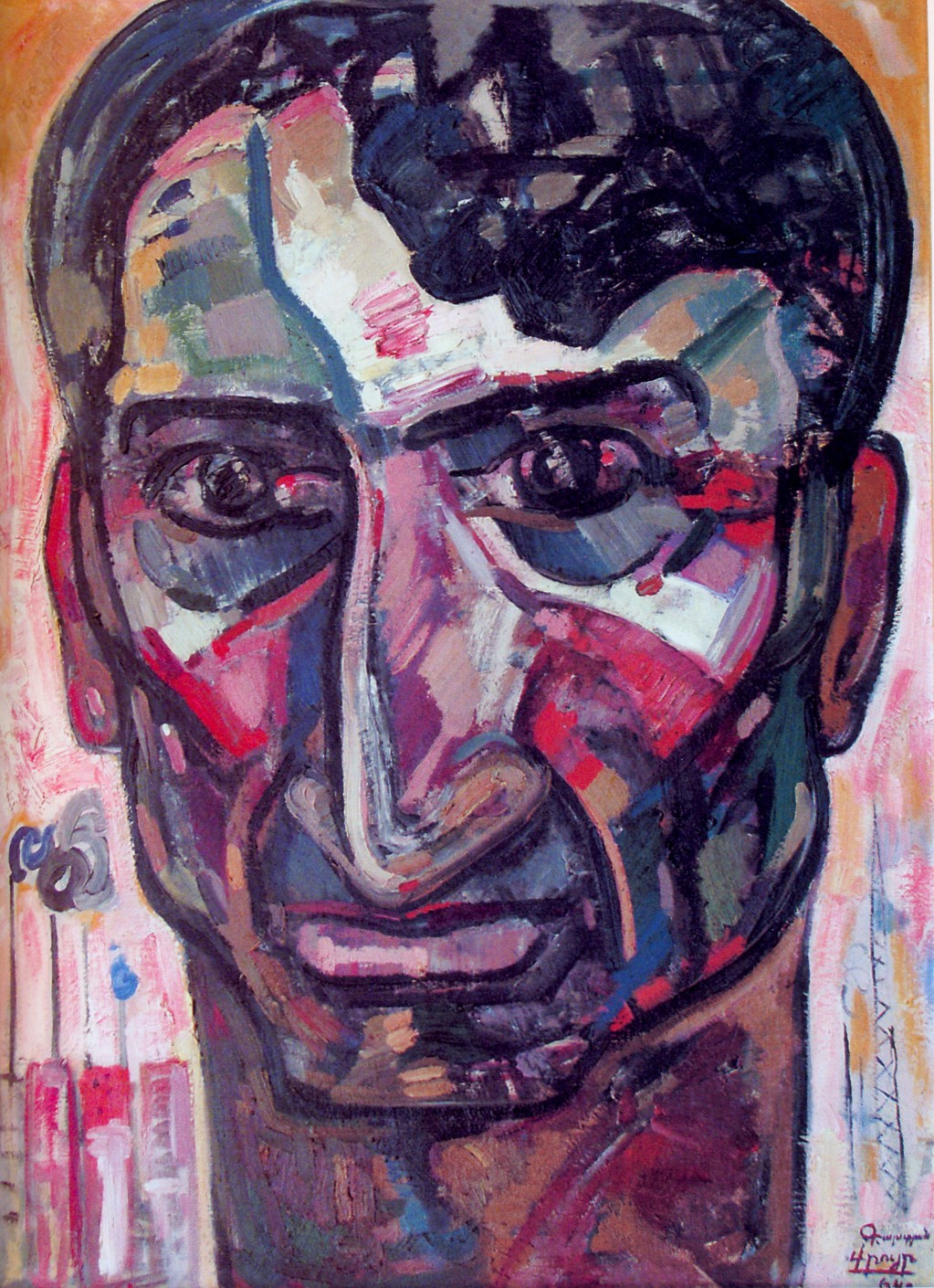
Yeghishe Charents Portrait 1964

His paintings are displayed in the National Gallery of Armenia, the Modern Art Museum, Yerevan, the Tretyakov Gallery, Moscow, the Museum of Oriental Art, Moscow, and in many private collections. Vruir Galstian died in 1996 in Yerevan.

== Books ==
In 2006 was published book “Vruir” by art critic Henrik Igityan, and in 2008 another book by art critic Helen Gayfejyan.

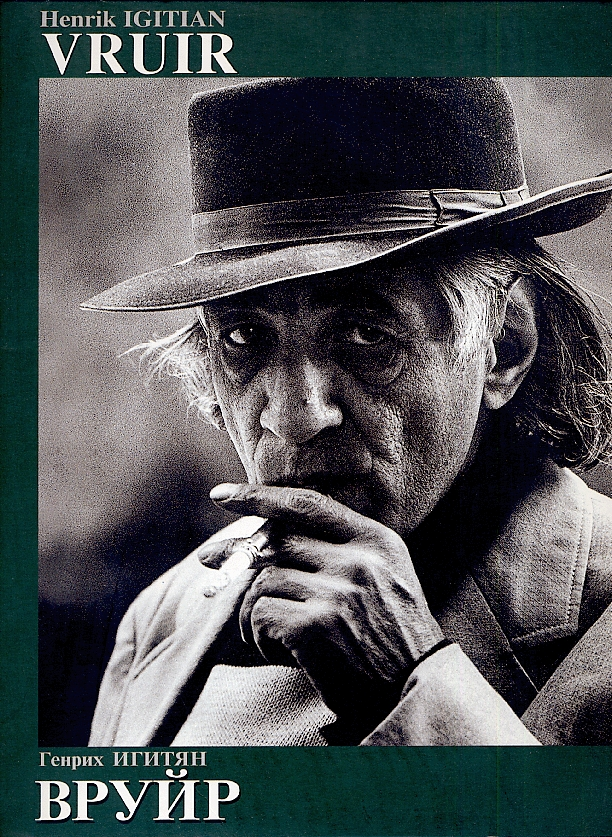
Henrik Igityan - “Vruir” (book)

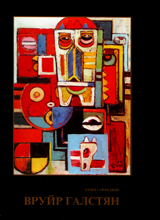
Helen Gayfejyan - “Vruir Galstian” (book)
