= Nyoman Rudana =

Indonesian politician

- Born: September 17, 1948 (age 77); Gelogor, Lodtunduh, in Gianyar Regency, Bali
- Education: Master Of Administration Public (ST LAN) Jakarta (2008)
- Occupation: Mendirikan Rudana Gallery (1974); Pendiri Museum Rudana (1991-Sekarang) - Anggota DPD RI/MPR RI (2004-2009) - Penasehat The Rudana (Sampai sekarang); Pembina/Penasehat Asosiasi Museum Indonesia (Sampai sekarang)
- Organization: Ketua PERCASI Bali; Ketua PUTRI (Himpunan Obyek Wisata Indonesia) Daerah - Provinsi Bali; Anggota Bali Tourism Board (Badan Pariwisata)
- Known for: Museum Rudana and Indonesian Senator
- Title: Senator
- Term: 2004–2009
- Spouse: Ni Wayan Olasthini
- Awards: 1. Gusti Nyoman Lempad Prize (Sanggar Dewata Indonesia); 2. Albero dell`Umanita (1994); 3. Penghargaan Upakerthi dari Presiden Republik Indonesia Soeharto (1994)
- Website: www.senatorrudana.com

Nyoman Rudana is a former member of the Regional Representatives Council of Indonesia. He is also the founder and owner of Museum Rudana, Rudana Fine Art Gallery and Genta Fine Art Gallery, and founder of artist support organizations in Ubud, Bali.

== Early life ==
Rudana was born September 17, 1948, in the village of Gelogor, Lodtunduh, in Ubud, Bali, the third of seven children in his family.

He later became a dancer in the Balinese dance opera group during high school. He finished high school in Denpasar in 1968 and attended Teacher College in Madiun city, East Java. He returned to Bali in 1970 as an apprentice math teacher in a Junior High School. He was married in 1973, and has two sons and two daughters.

== Art conservation work ==
President Soeharto presents Upakarti Award to Nyoman Rudana, Dec 1994

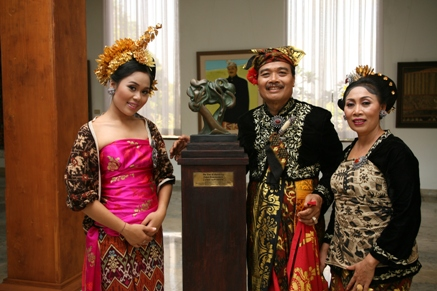
Nyoman Rudana, wife, and daughter Friska with The Tree of Humanity Award from the Italian government

In 1974, Rudana developed The Rudana Painter Community at the Sanur beach area to help local artists in selling their products. In 1978, he established the Rudana Fine Art Gallery in Ubud aiming to promote Balinese arts to visitors on the island. It was also intended to encourage local artists to develop their individual styles and grow the local art industry. For his work promoting Indonesian arts, The Artists Association of Indonesia presented him with the Lempad Prize in 1985.

Concerned that Balinese and Indonesian artistic heritage was being taken overseas, Rudana established Museum Rudana in Peliatan, Gianyar Regency. Its cornerstone was laid on 22 December 1990 with a serial of Balinese ceremony. The museum officially opened in 1995 with the goal of preserving Indonesian arts. On December 14, 1994, Rudana received the Upakarti Award from President Suharto in appreciation for his action in preserving Indonesian arts and his contribution to the development of small-scale industries in Bali.

In 1995, Rudana also founded The Rudana Art Foundation to help develop and promote art in Indonesia by sponsoring gifted children in studying art, performance and music. He has also developed other galleries to display Balinese arts, and established the Ksatria Seni Award in 2000, which is presented every four years to individuals or organizations for their dedication to working in arts and culture.

In November, 2000, Rudana received L'albero dell'umanita Award (The Tree of Humanity Award) from the Government of Italy as an appreciation for his promoting arts and brotherhood to the world.

== Career as Senator ==
Nyoman Rudana at 116th Assembly of IPU (Inter Parliamentary Union) Congress, in Nusa Dua, Bali, 29 April – 4 May 2007

Rudana was elected to the Regional Representatives Council of the Republic of Indonesia in the 2004 legislative election, as one of four senators representing Bali. He was in charge of Ad Hoc Committee 4, responsible for the national budget and financial balance between central and local government, providing opinion on the result of any investigation of the state finances and selecting the members of the State Audit Board and Taxes. He also serves on the People's Consultative Assembly.

Rudana founded the Ubud Rotary Club in 2001, and chaired the Bali Art Shops Association from 1980 to 1985.
