= K. D. Ushinsky South Ukrainian National Pedagogical University =

Public university in Odesa, Ukraine

Coordinates: 46.4805°N 30.7213°E

The State Institution “South Ukrainian National Pedagogical University named after K. D. Ushynsky” (Ushynsky University)
- Державний заклад «Південноукраїнський національний педагогічний університет імені К. Д. Ушинського»
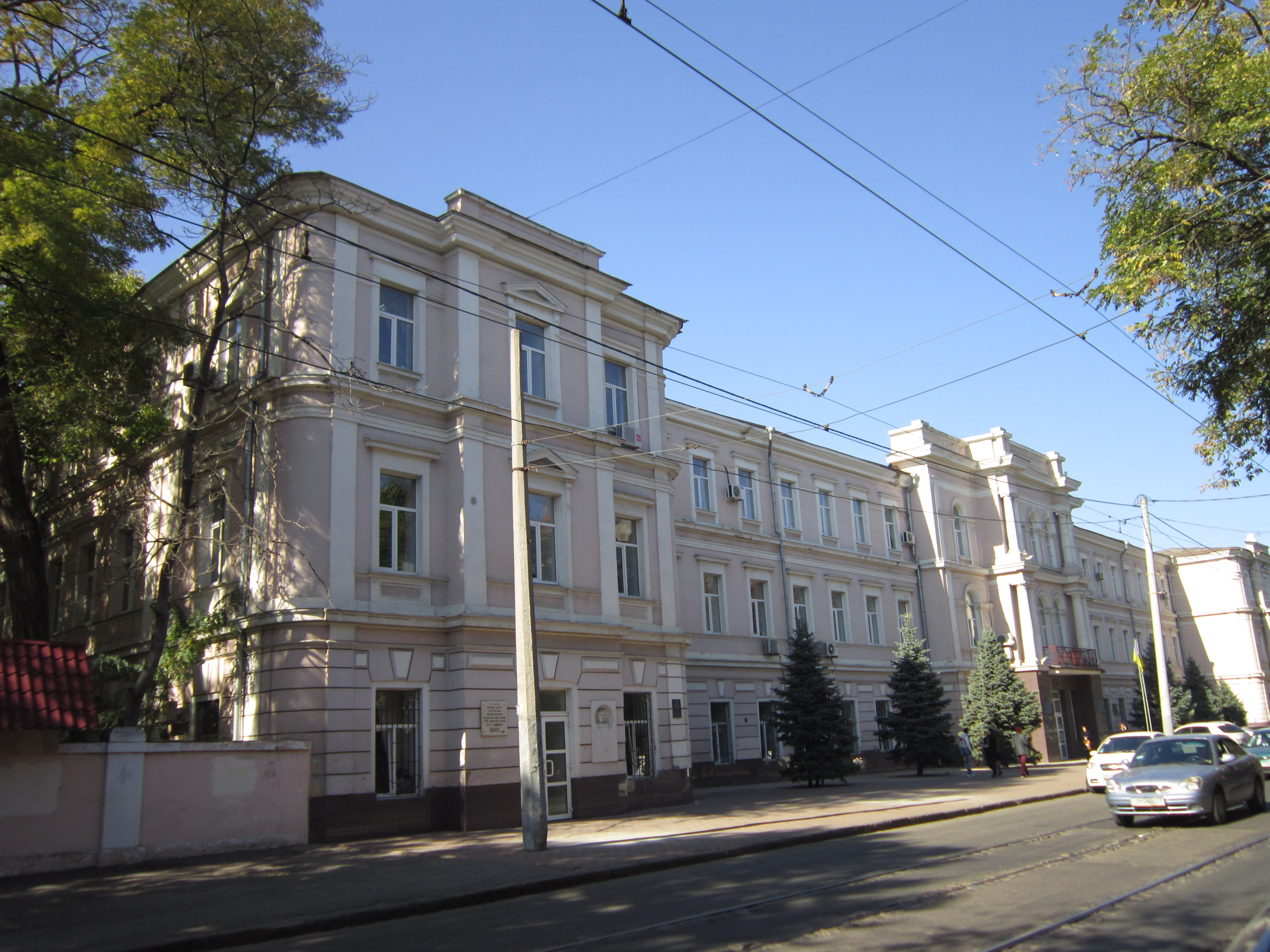
- Other names: Університет Ушинського
- Motto: Gloria et Honor Tibi, Magister!
- Established: 1817; 209 years ago
- Affiliations: Ministry of Education and Science of Ukraine
- Rector: Andrii Krasnozhon
- Students: 6263
- Location: Odesa, Ukraine
- Website: https://pdpu.edu.ua/en/
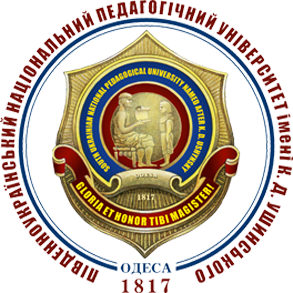

Immovable Monument of Local Significance of Ukraine
- Official name: Будівля Другої чоловічої гімназії (арх. Мазиров Д.Є.), у якому навчались: - Шмідт О.Ю.- вчений, акад., Герой Радянського Союзу; - Олійник С. - український поет; - вчився і до 1941 р. працював Надеїн Д. П. - український поет журналіст; - Цвигун С. К.- військовий діяч і письменник, Герой соціалістичної Праці, генерал армії (Building of the Second Men's Gymnasium (arch. D. E Mazyrov), where studied: the scientist, academic, and Hero of the Soviet Union O. Y. Schmidt; Ukrainian poet S. Oliinyk; Ukrainian poet and journalist D. P. Nadein (worked until 1941); military leader, writer, Hero of Socialist Labor, and army general S. K. Tsvyhun)
- Type: Architecture, Urban Planning, History
- Reference no.: 819-Од

The South Ukrainian National Pedagogical University named after K. D. Ushynsky (Ukrainian: Південноукраїнський національний педагогічний університет імені К. Д. Ушинського) is a public university in the large city of Odesa. Founded in 1817, SUNPU is one of the oldest educational institutions of Ukraine and the first teaching one on the northern Black Sea coast.

South Ukrainian National Pedagogical University named after Kostiantyn Ushynsky was established as Pedagogical Institute at Richelieu Lyceum in Odesa on 2 May 1817. It is regarded one of the oldest & most influential pedagogical university of Ukraine.

== History ==
The University started as a Pedagogical Institute which was established pursuant to the Decree of the Emperor Alexander I in Odesa on 2 May 1817, as a separate structural unit at the Richelieu Lyceum.

During its 200-year history the University has undergone numerous changes of names (the Institute of Teachers, the Institute of People's Education, Odesa State Pedagogical Institute named after Kostiantyn Ushynsky, South Ukrainian State Pedagogical University named after Kostiantyn Ushynsky, South Ukrainian national pedagogical university named after Kostiantyn Ushynsky), liquidations and updates.

Before 1941 the Institute used to be one of the largest in the city by the number of enrolled students. However, during World War II the Institute was evacuated. It was relocated to the city of Bayram-Ali in the Turkmen SSR, where it functioned until 1944.

Fifteen hundred students and teachers went to the front, almost seven hundred of which were killed. Three defenders – Vasyl Musin, Volodymyr Morhunenkov and Anatolii Kovalenko were awarded the title of Hero of the Soviet Union.

For outstanding achievements in the training of teaching staff in 1945 by the Resolution of the Government of Ukraine the Institute was given the name of the outstanding scientist and teacher – Kostiantyn Ushynsky.

In 1970 Odesa State Pedagogical Institute named after Kostiantyn Ushynsky was awarded a diploma of the Presidium of the Supreme Soviet of the Ukrainian Soviet Socialist Republic.

On 29 September 1994, the Cabinet of Ministers of Ukraine on the basis of Odesa State Pedagogical Institute named after K. D. Ushynsky created South Ukrainian State Pedagogical University named after K. D. Ushynsky.

In 2007, the staff of the University was awarded by the Cabinet of Ministers of Ukraine for the contribution to the development of education, training highly qualified specialists, productive scientific and pedagogical activity and employment gains.

On 13 July 2009 by the Decree of the President of Ukraine the University granted a national status.

The modern University is the flagship of pedagogical education in the South of Ukraine, where students, post-graduate students and doctors have been successfully training in 47 specialties and specializations.

The University is composed of 38 departments that are headed by doctors and professors – recognized experts in their fields. About five hundred teachers and twenty foreign specialists work at its departments.

== Scientific Work ==
There are twelve academicians, seventy professors, doctors of science among the pedagogues; eighteen teachers have an honorary title “Honoured Worker of Science of Ukraine”, “Honoured Worker of Education of Ukraine”, “Honoured Worker of Culture”, “Honoured Artist of Ukraine”, “Honoured Coach of Ukraine” and are the winners of state awards. A lot of University scholars were presented with international awards, elected to be members of national and international academies, societies and associations.

The most important scientific studies at the University were carried out in the framework of seventeen internationally recognized scientific schools.

The results of the University studies are reflected in printed works – more than two thousand scientific papers are annually published at home and foreign editing houses. Numerous monographs are published in different languages and in cooperation with the scholars of the United States, Israel, China, United Kingdom, Lithuania and other countries.

Every year the University supports organizations of more than thirty international and Ukrainian scientific conferences. The University of Ushynsky is a founder of scientific journals in philosophy, political science, sociology, psychology, pedagogy, philology and others.

The University offers seven specialized Doctoral and Candidate Thesis Committees in twelve majors. Each year more than seventy theses are passed. Three hundred Ukrainian and foreign students from fifteen countries take postgraduate and doctorate courses as well as individual academic programs.

Almost three thousand students are involved in scientific work, the results of which are reflected in thousands of articles published every year. The participants of the educational process are winners of almost seventy contests, competitions and various Olympiads of national and international levels.

== Ranking & Reputation ==
According to SCOPUS database (25.04.2023), the University ranks 76th among all universities in Ukraine.

The University collaborates with 80 educational and scientific institutions around the world, which makes it an influential university not just in Ukraine but all over the Europe.

There is an International Centre for Distance Learning functioning in association with the University; educational scientific information and culture offices of the State of Israel, the US, Lithuania, China and Korea develop their work under the support of the University. The establishment is a coordinator of project studies by international programs Tempus, Vyshehrad Fund, the “Ukraine-Norway“ Fund and others).

The University is constantly developing. In recent years there was a significant increase in number of majors and specializations of training graduate, postgraduate and doctoral students. The University has an extensive system of material resources for providing educational process and scientific work. Thus, a modern scientific library was put into operation.

The University provides all necessary conditions for artistic, creative and sports activities of its students who can participate in forty sections and hobby groups.

Significant sporting achievements of the University students and graduates of different years are represented with twenty five Olympic champions, eighty three winners of world and European championships, twenty-eight honoured coaches and masters of sports of Ukraine.

Amateur creative collectives take part in many prestigious competitions and festivals in Ukraine, Poland, Czech Republic, China, the United States and other countries where they annually win prizes and get the Grand Prix.

Currently, according to different ratings the University is among the leaders of pedagogical and humanities universities and is presented with high awards, namely those of the Verkhovna Rada of Ukraine, the Cabinet of Ministers of Ukraine, Ministry of Education and Science of Ukraine and others.

== Institutes and faculties ==
- The Faculty of Primary Education
- The Faculty of Arts and Graphics
- The Faculty of Music and Choreography
- The Faculty of Physics and Mathematics
- The Institute of Postgraduate Education and Certification
- The Institute of Physical Education, Sports and Rehabilitation
- The Faculty of History and Philology
- The Faculty of Foreign Languages
- The Faculty of Preschool Pedagogy and Psychology
- The Faculty of Social Studies and Humanitie

== Faculty and graduates ==
Since its establishment the university has trained more than 100,000 specialists for the Ukrainian educational system and thirty other countries. Among its graduates and pedagogues are ministers, deputies of different levels, mayors, heads of large institutions, scientists and educators, directors of research institutes, schools, rectors of higher educational institutions, trainers and masters of sports, winners of Olympiads, recognized artists who made a contribution to the development of education and science worldwide.

Graduates and faculty include twice State prize laureate, founder of new directions in the theory of physics A. Y. Kiv, State prize laureate, founder of theoretical and methodological foundations of modern psychology Sergii Rubinstein, State prize laureate Academician A. M. Bogush, the founder of experimental psychology Professor M. M. Lange and the founders of different scientific schools, which received international recognition – Academicians D. K. Tretyakov, O. Ya. Chebykin, O. P. Sannikova, Corresponding Members Mykola Chebotariov, V. I. Voitko, D. A. Svirenko, R. Yu. Martynova, S. O. Skvortsova; founders of Professional Pedagogy Professor R. I. Hmelyuk, L. I. Fursenko; famous artists: poets – V. A. Bershadsky, A. Sh. Huberman, V. I. Ivanovych; writers – S. I. Oliinyk, Ye. S. Kravchenko, I. A. Lutsenko; folk artists – A. I. Loza, P. A. Zlochevsk; outstanding athletes – Olympic champions Marharyta Nikolaieva, Georgy Mondzolevski, Yevhen Lapinsky, Viktor Mikhalchuk, Yakiv Zheleznyak, Serhiy Petrenko, Nadezhda Olizarenko, Olena Sokolovska, Hennadiy Avdyeyenko, Mykola Milchev, Yuriy Bilonoh, D. Alekseev, Serhiy Demchuk, Iurii Cheban, Vasyl Lomachenko and others, Hero of Socialist Labour Semyon Tsvigun, Hero of Ukraine B. D. Lytvak, People's Teacher of the USSR M. M. Paltyshev and more than two thousand distinguished scientists, artists, representatives of people's education.

== See also ==
List of universities in Ukraine
