= Eduard Isabekyan =

Armenian painter (1914–2007)

- Էդուարդ Իսաբեկյան
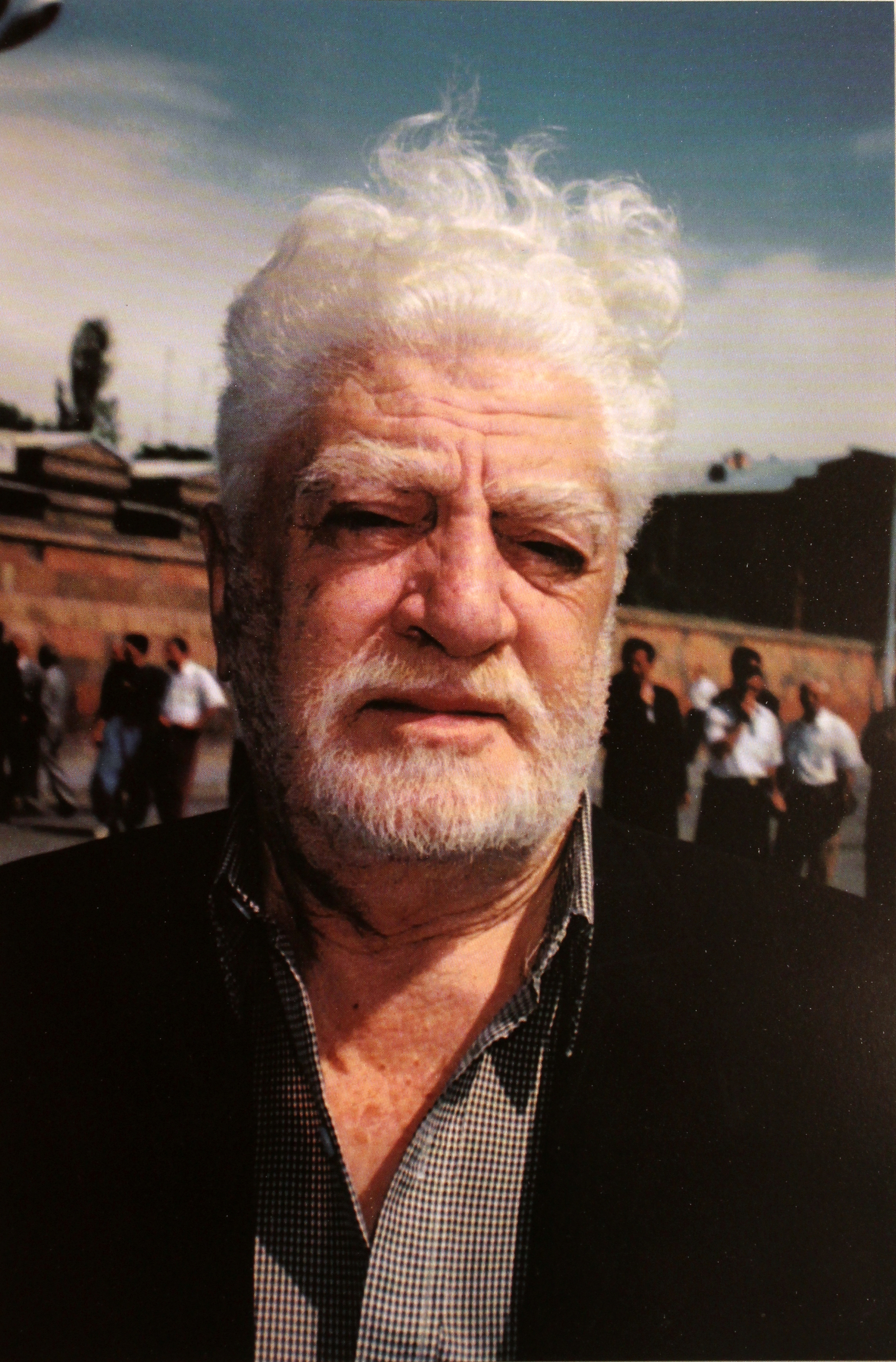
- Born: 8 November 1914; Iğdır, Surmalinsky Uyezd, Erivan Governorate, Russian Empire
- Died: 17 August 2007 (aged 92); Ashtarak, Armenia
- Known for: Painter
- Notable work: "Noah with his sons", "Reply to Hazkerto", "Artavazd and Cleopatra", "On the Araks bank"
- Awards: Honored worker of arts (1956); People's Painter of Armenia (1963); "Mesrop Mashtots" medal (2001); Honorable citizen of Yerevan (2002); "St.Sahak-St.Mesrop" medal (2004)
- Website: http://eduardisabekyan.com

Eduard Isabekyan (Armenian: Էդուարդ Իսաբեկյան; November 8, 1914 – August 17, 2007) was an Armenian painter, founder of thematic compositional genre in Armenia.

== Career and works ==
Isabekyan was the founder of thematic compositional genre in Armenia. The basis of his art is the history of Armenian nation and its future, its proud posture and the ecstatic potential. Isabekyan's works of thematic compositional genre are the achievement of Armenian fine art of the Soviet period. "Young David" (1956, The National Gallery of Armenia), "The Revolt of Haghpat Peasants in 1903" (1957), "Reply to Hazkert" (1960, The National Gallery of Armenia) and other paintings are distinguished by their monumental expressiveness, dynamic composition and civic resonance.

A number of Isabekyan's paintings are characterized by organic intercourse of a man and the native nature: "Old Man from Byurakan and the Artavazik Church" (1956), "Aksel Bakunts" (1956), "Derenik Demirtchyan" (1960), "Curly Boy" (1964), "Sayat Nova" (1964). One of the best examples of Armenian portraiture of Soviet period is the "Mother’s portrait" painting (1944).

The thematic center of his landscapes is the epic description of Armenian nature, ancient fortresses and temples: "In the Canyon of Tatev" (1959), "The Oxen Crossing the River by the Bridge" (1959), "Khndzoresk" (1962).

Many paintings are distinguished by artistic saturation: "Horovel" (1956, The National Gallery of Armenia), "Near the well" ("They didn’t come back", 1965), "In the shade of the trees" (1966), "Artavazd’s death" (1966). The illustrations of Derenik Demirchian’s "Vardananq" and Sero Khanzadyan’s "Mkhitar Sparapet" novels are also commonly known.

Isabekyan was the author of a number of drawings and the series of graphics devoted to painter Arpenik Nalbandyan.

Isabekyan was elected as an honorary chairman of "Iğdır" patriotic union for the term of his life. During his lifetime the Municipality of Yerevan made a decision to establish a permanent exhibition hall (gallery) for Isabekyan's art. The Eduard Isabekyan Gallery opened on May 3, 2013, at 7a, Mashtots Avenue, in Yerevan.

Isabekyan died on August 17, 2007. He is buried in Komitas Pantheon

A separate hall is allotted to Isabekyan's permanent exhibition in The National Gallery of Armenia (total number of his works retained there is 121). His paintings are in many museums and private collections.

== Exhibitions ==
- 1931 – Exhibition of young Armenian artists
- 1935 – "House of Red army" presented several graphic compositions (sketches of meetings, a self-portrait)
- 1943 – Exhibited his works that were accomplished during the army in Armenia and Moscow
- 1947 – 1st Personal exhibition, Yerevan, Armenia
- 1964 – Personal exhibition celebrating his 50th birthday
- 1965 – Personal exhibition in Tbilisi and Bulgaria
- 1967 – Participated in exhibition in Montreal
- 1970 – "Urartu till today" exhibition, Paris
- 1974 – Morocco, personal exhibition
- 1988 – Personal exhibition, Central House of Artists, Moscow
- 2004 – Personal exhibition, Artists' Union of Armenia, Yerevan
- 2006 - Personal exhibition, "Academy" Gallery, Yerevan
- 2014 – Personal exhibition (devoted to the 100th anniversary of Edurad Isabekyan) National Gallery of Armenia, Yerevan

== Awards ==
- 1956 – Announced the honored worker of arts
- 1963 – Announced the People's Painter of Armenia
- 2001 – Is awarded the "Mesrop Mashtots" medal by the Armenian Catholicos
- 2002 – Becomes an honorable citizen of Yerevan
- 2004 – Is awarded the "St.Sahak-St.Mesrop" medal by the Armenian Catholicos

== See also ==
- List of Armenian artists
- List of Armenians
- Culture of Armenia
