= Made Wianta =

Indonesian artist (1949–2020)

Made Wianta (20 December 1949 – 13 November 2020) was an Indonesian artist who was concerned with social and cultural changes and social issues. He has been described as one of his country's best known artists.

== Selected works ==
Growing Hands (1983)
Chinese ink on paper
55 cm x 3.75 cm
A painting made with Chinese ink. Wianta considered this to be a painting during the Karangasem Period.

Unformal Object II (1998)
A painting that combines both western and Asian medium, using both oil and acrylic as well as Chinese ink. This work is considered to be completed during the Dot period, displaying an influence of pointillism within his artwork.

Golden City on Blue (1995)
Chinese ink and acrylic on canvas
A painting which comprises geometrical shapes. Mediums include Chinese ink, acrylic with gold-leaf on the canvas. This is a work he considered under his Quadrangle Period.

Purple Calligraphy (2010)
A painting completed on fragrant canvas with acrylic. Strong Chinese painting influence can be observed.

Calligraphy on the blue gate (1995)
Acrylic and gold on canvas
247 cm x 117 cm

Broken Triangle (1990)
Oil and acrylic on canvas
120 cm X 91 cm

Golden City On Blue (undated)
Chinese ink, oil, and gold-leaf on canvas
30 cm X 30 cm
