= Levon Manaseryan =

Armenian artist (1925–2019)

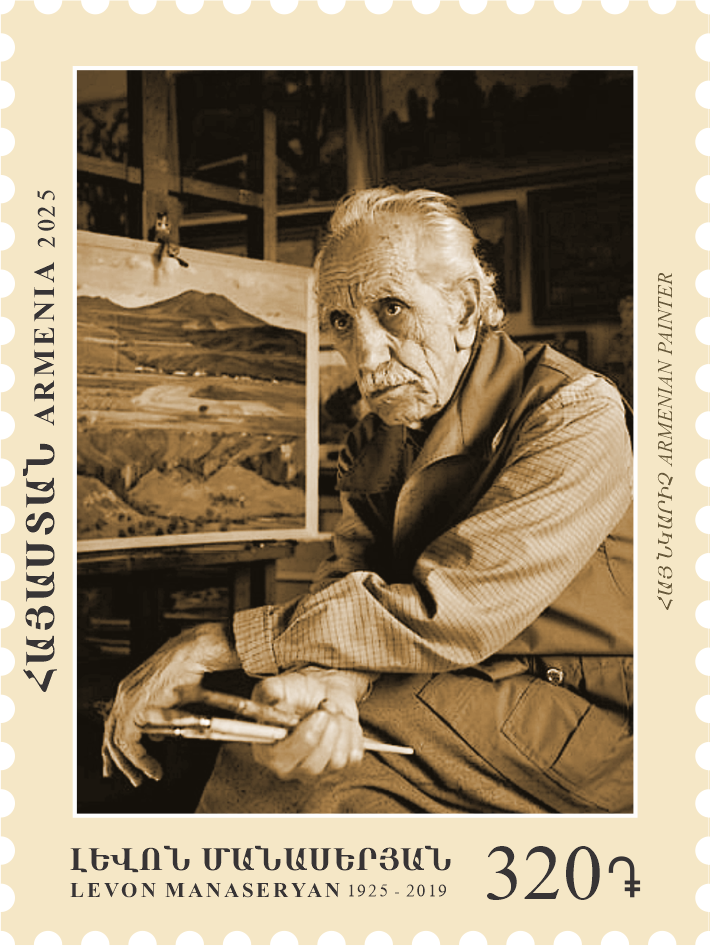
- Manaseryan on a 2025 stamp of Armenia
- Born: June 3, 1925; Vagharshapat, Armenia
- Died: September 12, 2019 (aged 94)
- Known for: Painter

Levon Manaseryan (Armenian: Լևոն Մանասերյան; June 3, 1925 – September 12, 2019) was an Armenian artist and university professor.

== Biography ==
Levon Manaseryan was born in the city Vagharshapat, Armenia.

1943–1944 Participated in the World War II.
1951 Artist at the Vagharshapat theatre.
1953 Graduated from the Yerevan Art & Theatre Institute.
1958 Member of the Armenian Union of Artists.
1961 The First Prize at a National Contest for the poster "The Hero of Gugarats Land".
1963 Instructor in the Chair of Drawing and Painting, Yerevan Polytechnic Institute.
1971 Award of the Ministry of Education of the Armenian SSR for his ABC Text book.
1980 Docent at the Chair of Drawing, Painting, and Sculpture, Yerevan Polytechnic Institute 1983 Honored Artist of Armenia.
1983 Medal "Высшая Школа СССР " ("Higher School of the USSR") honorable award of the Ministry of Higher Education of the USSR.
1984 Bronze Medal of the Pan-Soviet Exhibition of the Achievements of National Economy.
2006 Professor of the Yerevan State University of Architecture and Construction.
2009 Gold Medal of the Yerevan State University of Architecture and Construction.
