= Education in Ukraine =

Ministry of Education and Science (Міністерство освіти і науки)
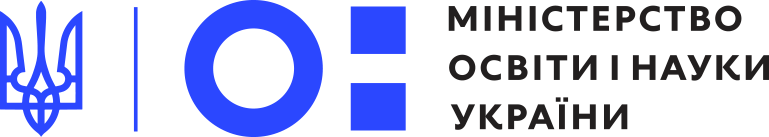

Agency overview
- Formed: 8 July 1992
- Preceding agency: Ministry of Education and Science, Youth and Sports
- Jurisdiction: Ukraine
- Headquarters: 10, Victory Sq., Kyiv
- Minister responsible: Oksen Lisovyi Minister of Education and Sci.
- Child agencies: Service for intellectual property; Agency of Science, Innovations, and Informativeness
- Website: Official website

Starting in September 2018, children who start school have 12 years of education, while those already in school complete their studying by 11-year system. As a rule, schooling begins at the age of 6, unless your birthday is on or after 1 September. In 2016/17, the number of students in primary and secondary school reached 3,846,000, in vocational school 285,800, and in higher education 1,586,700 students. According to 2017 EduConf speech of the (then) Minister of Education and Science of Ukraine, Liliya Hrynevych, the amount of budget financing for the sphere of education would reach about ₴53 billion in 2017 (compared to 42 in 2016).

The NGO Human Rights Measurement Initiative in the spring of 2022 concluded that Ukraine is fulfilling 84.2% of what they should be fulfilling on the right to education, based on their level of income.

== Ukrainian educational system ==
The Ukrainian educational system is organized into five levels: preschool, primary, secondary, upper secondary and postgraduate education.

In 2010 a total of 56% of children aged one to six years old had the opportunity to attend preschool education, the Education and Science Ministry of Ukraine reported in August 2010.

Schools receive 50% of their funding from the city budget and 50% from the national Government budget. The Cabinet of Ministers of Ukraine intends to give general education schools the option to independently manage the financial resources assigned from the state budget starting from 1 January 2010.

=== School level ===
| Grade | Age | School level | Accreditation |
|---|---|---|---|
| 1 | 6/7 | primary | I level |
| 2 | 7/8 | primary | I level |
| 3 | 8/9 | primary | I level |
| 4 | 9/10 | primary | I level |
| 5 | 10/11 | secondary, base | II level |
| 6 | 11/12 | secondary, base | II level |
| 7 | 12/13 | secondary, base | II level |
| 8 | 13/14 | secondary, base | II level |
| 9 | 14/15 | secondary, base | II level |
| 10 | 15/16 | secondary, last | III level |
| 11 | 16/17 | secondary, last | III level |
| 12 | 17/18 | secondary, last | III level |

Currently in Ukraine, school attendance is designated for children and teenagers from age 6 to 17. Ukraine has several types of general education institutions. Some schools may be boarding schools and named school-internat or lyceum-internat.

- Middle School of General Education (ZOSh) or Middle School
- Lyceum (Technikum in the Soviet times)
- Grammar school

The institution is called Middle School of General Education (ZOSh) or simply Middle School, and usually combines primary and secondary levels of education. The system was first introduced in 1958 and included a 12-grade system, while in 1965 it was a 10-grade system. Most middle schools have all three levels of accreditation for General Education. Some remote schools have only two levels, which is the minimum requirement for all middle schools.

Primary and secondary education is divided into three levels of accreditation of general education: I - "younger", II - "middle", and III - "senior". Level 1 comprises grades 1 to 4. Grades 5-9 are usually considered a II level of accreditation or a base secondary education, while 10-12 are a III level. Despite the names, students usually study in the same school throughout their primary and secondary education. Elementary schooling lasts for 4 years, middle school for 5 and high school for 3.

The objective of general schooling is to give younger students knowledge of the arts and sciences, and teach them how to use it practically. The middle school curriculum includes classes in the Ukrainian language, Ukrainian Literature, a foreign language, world literature, Ukrainian history, world history, geography, algebra, geometry, biology, chemistry, physics, physical education, music, and art. At some schools, students also take environment and civics classes. Students attend each class only once or twice a week. Part of the school day is also spent in activities such as chess, karate, drama, learning folktales and folk songs, choir, and band. After school, students might also have music lessons, football, hockey, or tennis.

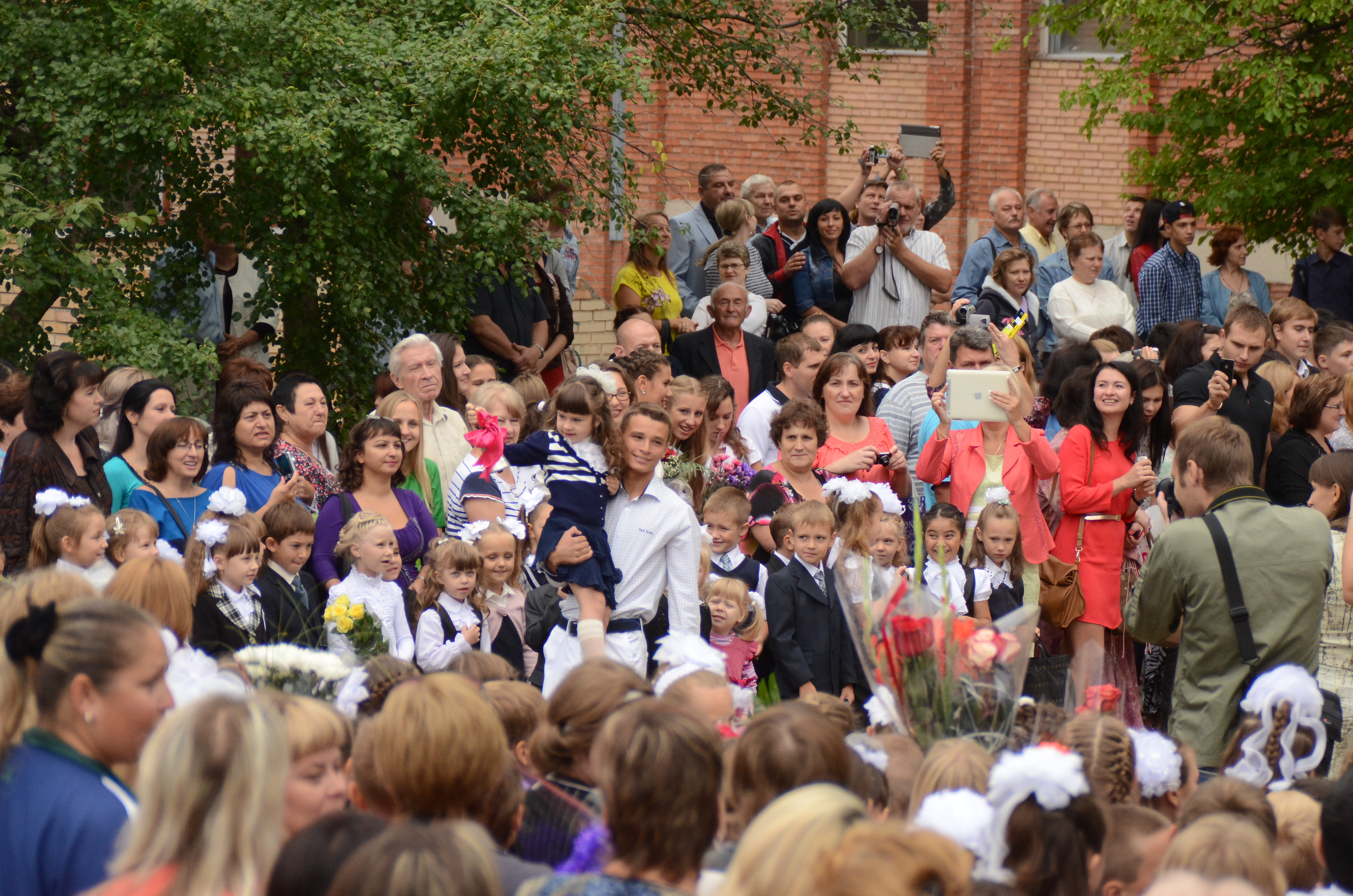
Knowledge Day in Donetsk, 2013

During grades 9 and 12, which is usually around the age of 15 and 17, students take various exams. The current examination system is undergoing change. In grades 9 and 12 students take Independent Government Tests (IGTs), which allows eleventh graders to enter university without taking separate entrance exams. In 2008, entrance exams were abolished and the IGTs became the standard for determining entrance eligibility. However, the system was changed again in 2010.

In school year 2009-2010 potential graduates are scheduled to undergo external independent testing after the final state examination, in the following subjects: Ukrainian language and literature, history of Ukraine, mathematics, biology, physics, chemistry, geography, and one foreign language (of the pupil's choice) in either English, German, French, or Spanish. The results of the testing will have the same status as entrance examinations to institutions of higher education. But some universities can convert points in the external independent test certificate according to their own rating system.

Since 2018, pre-higher education now lasts for 12 years. This means all students who entered grade 1 in 2018 will graduate after completing grade 12; however this does not apply to students who have completed grade 1 prior to 2018.

=== Home schooling ===
Educating children at home is legal in Ukraine and expressly allowed for in Articles 59 and 60 of Ukraine's Education Law.

=== International Schools ===
- Meridian International School, Kyiv (est. 2001)
- Kyiv International School (est. 1992)
- French Lycee Anne of Kyiv (est. 1994)
- British International School, Ukraine (est.1997 Nivki, 2011 Pechersk, Dnipro)
- Pechersk School International
- Klovsky Lyceum № 77 (est. 1979)

=== University level (Post-secondary education) ===
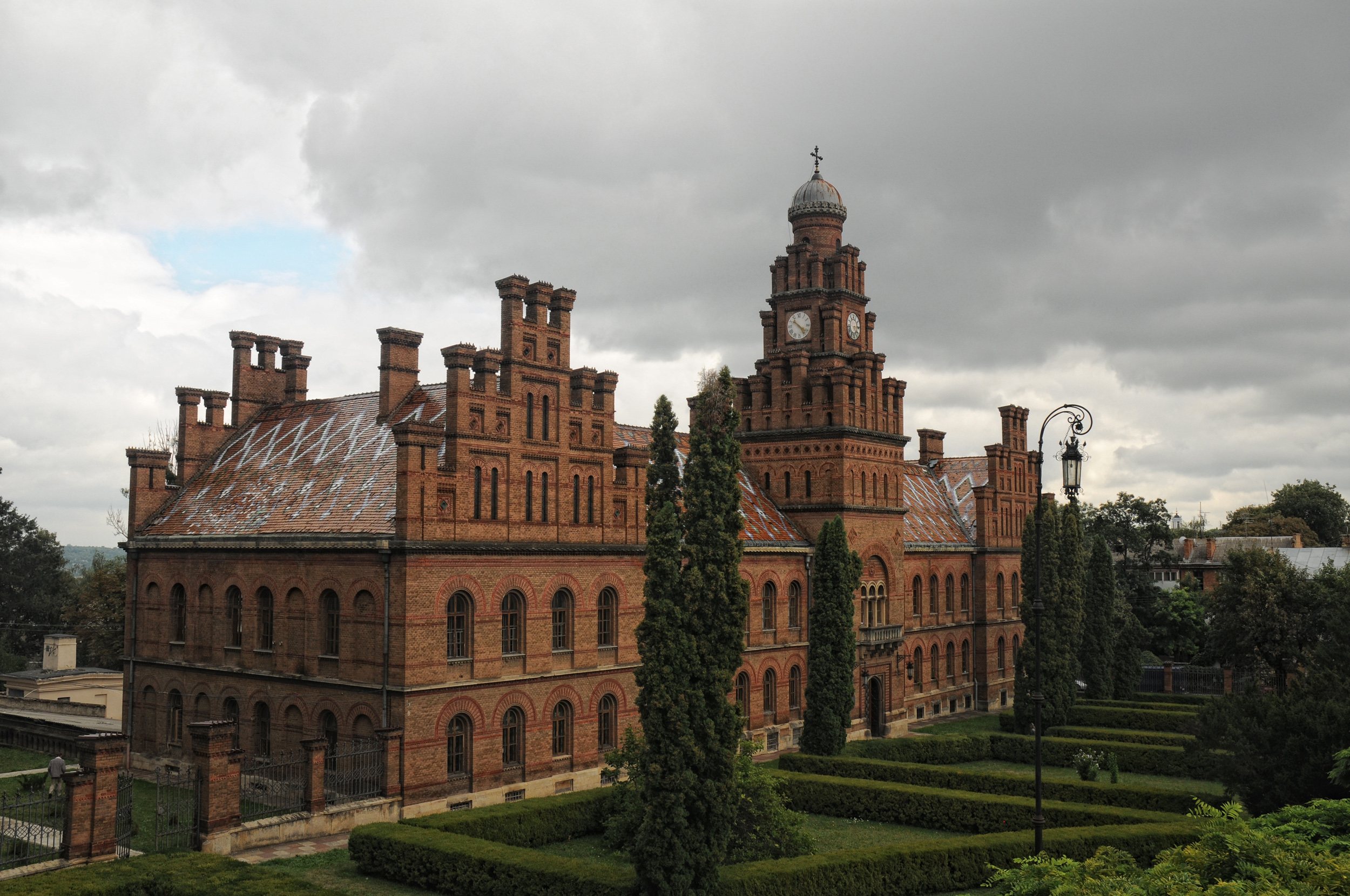
Chernivtsi University.

Higher education is either state funded or private. Students who study at state expense receive a standard scholarship if their average marks at the end-of-term exams and differentiated test is at least 4 (see the 5-point grade system below); this rule may be different in some universities. In the case of all grades being the highest (5), the scholarship is increased by 25%. For most students the level of government subsidy is not sufficient to cover their basic living expenses. Most universities provide subsidized housing for out-of-city students. Also, it is common for libraries to supply required books for all registered students.

There are two degrees conferred by Ukrainian universities: the bachelor's degree (4 years) and the master's degree (5–6th year). These degrees are introduced in accordance with Bologna process, in which Ukraine is taking part. Historically, Specialist's Degree (usually 5 years) is still also granted; it was the only degree awarded by universities in the Soviet times. Almost all major universities are located in oblast centers.

=== Postgraduate level ===
Upon obtaining a master's degree or Specialist, a student may enter a university or a scientific institute to pursue postgraduate education. The first level of postgraduate education is aspirantura that usually results in the Kandydat Nauk degree (Candidate of Sciences). Candidates must pass three or more qualifying exams (one or more in the field of specialty, one in a foreign language of their choice and one in philosophy), publish at least five papers in peer-reviewed journals (according to requirements existed up to 2013 they had to publish at least three papers), write a dissertation and defend it. This degree is roughly equivalent to the Ph.D. in the United States.

After graduation a student may continue postgraduate education. This takes from two to four years of study in doctorantura. Significant scientific results must be obtained and published, and a new thesis written. This produces a Doctor Nauk degree (Doctor of Sciences), but the more typical way is working in a university or scientific institute with parallel preparation of a thesis. The average time between obtaining Kandidat and Doctor degrees is roughly 10 years, and most of new Doctors are 40 and more years old. Only one of four Kandidats reaches this grade. Kandidat Nauk may keep the position associate professor in universities, or Researcher/Senior Researcher in scientific institutes. Doctor Nauk can hold position of full Professor, Head of Laboratory or an equal/higher positions. The Ukrainian Ministry of Education and Science is considering changing the Soviet style Kandidat Nauk and Doctor Nauk degrees to Doctor of Philosophy and Doctor Habilitation, as has happened in several other post-Soviet countries.

== Marks ==
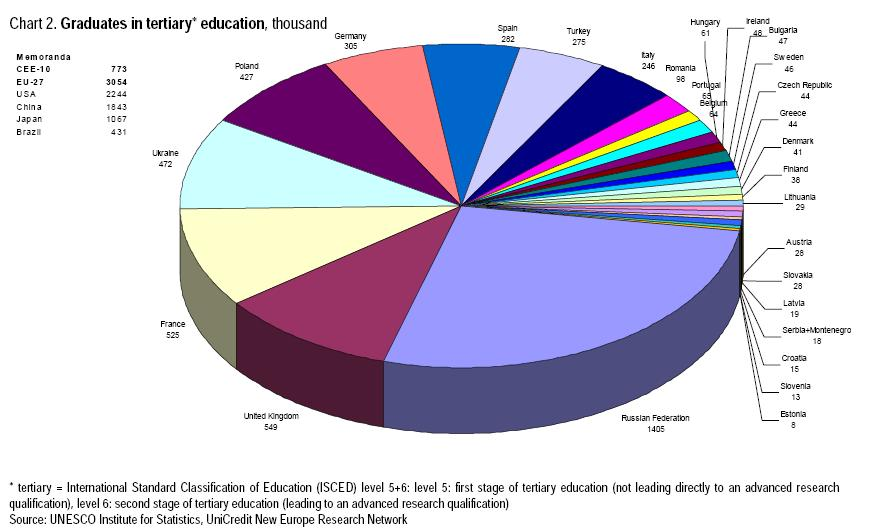
Ukraine produces the fourth largest number of academic graduates in Europe.

Ukraine has a 99.4 literacy rate. Ukrainian universities use a traditional 5-point scale:

- "5" = "excellent"
- "4" = "good"
- "3" = "satisfactory"
- "2" = "unsatisfactory".

"5", "4", "3" can be described as "Passed", "2" - as "Fail".

Students who get a failing grade of "2", have two more chances to pass an examination.

Since 2006 (and even earlier in some universities), university students are graded on a rating scale of 0 to 100. These grades can be transformed to the 5-point scale approximately as follows (this system may vary a little from university to university and may change from time to time):

- from 90 to 100 means "5" —– A
- from 74 to 89 means "4" —— B, C
- from 60 to 73 means "3" —— D, E
- from 0 to 59 means "2" —— F

Both the rating scale and the 5-point scale are used in university registers. Some lecturers prefer to use A-F-point scale to rate students during their passing the exams.

As for secondary schools, they also used the above-mentioned 5-point scale till 2000. Since 2000 secondary schools use a 12-point scale, which could be transformed into the traditional 5-point scale as follows:

- "12" = "5+"
- "11" = "5"
- "10" = "5-"
- "9" = "4+"
- "8" = "4"
- "7" = "4-"
- "6" = "3+"
- "5" = "3"
- "4" = "3-"
- "3" = "2+"
- "2" = "2"
- "1" = "2-"
- "0" = "2--"

Here signs "+" and "-" denote respectively better and worse version of a mark, for example, "4-" means "somewhat worse than good". Mark "0" is very rarely given in Ukrainian schools (when student refuses to answer for question or doing any exam or task). This mark can be compared to "2--" (in Russia) and/or "F--" in the USA.

== Languages used in Educational Establishments ==
On 25 September 2017 a new law; the law "On Education" on education was signed by President Poroshenko (draft approved by Rada on 5 September 2017) which will make Ukrainian the language of education from the fifth grade on. The law makes exceptions for one or more subjects that are allowed to be taught in two or more languages, namely English or one of the other official languages of the European Union, and allows any languages to be taught as separate subjects. The 2017 law stipulated a three-year transitional period, later extended until 2023.

The law was condemned by PACE that called it "a major impediment to the teaching of national minorities". The law also faced criticism from officials in Hungary, Romania and Russia. (Hungarian and Romanian are official languages of the European Union, Russian is not) Ukrainian officials stressed that the new law complies fully with European norms on minority rights. The law does state that "Persons belonging to indigenous peoples of Ukraine are guaranteed the right to study in public facilities of preschool and primary education in the language of instruction of the respective indigenous people, along with the state language of instruction" in separate classes or groups. PACE describes this as a significant curtailing of the rights of indigenous peoples carried out without consultations with their representatives. On 27 June 2018 Ukrainian foreign minister Pavlo Klimkin stated that following the recommendation of the Venice Commission the language provision of the (September 2017) law on education will not apply to private schools and that every public school for national minorities "will have broad powers to independently determine which classes will be taught in Ukrainian or their native language."

In January 2020, the 2017 education language law was changed and made it legal to teach "one or more disciplines" in "two or more languages – in the official state language, in English, in another official languages of the European Union". All not state funded schools were made free to choose their own language of instruction. According to the 2020 law until the fifth year of education all lessons can be completely taught in the minority language without mandatory teaching of subjects in Ukrainian. In the fifth year not less than 20% of the lessons must be taught in Ukrainian. Then every year the volume of teaching in the state language (Ukrainian) should increase, reaching 40% in the ninth grade. In the twelfth and final year at least 60% of education should be taught in Ukrainian.

Since the language of instruction in Ukrainian schools is the state language, which is Ukrainian (national minorities are guaranteed the right to study in public educational facilities including their language alongside Ukrainian).

In 2000/2001 academic year, 70% of students attended Ukrainian-language schools (that is where Ukrainian is the primary language of instruction), while 29% were studying in Russian-language schools. There are schools with instruction in Romanian, Crimean Tatar, Hungarian, and Polish in regions populated by those groups. Historically, the language of instruction has often changed in Ukraine. When Ukraine was part of the Russian Empire, the Ukrainian language was proscribed, and Russian predominated among the elite, who had access to schools. The initial policies of the Bolsheviks were supportive of local languages, and many Ukrainian-language schools were opened, with the long-term goal of getting rid of illiteracy. From the mid-1930s to the mid-1980s, the Soviet government policies favoured Russification. In the 1970s and 1980s, the number of Russian-language schools constantly increased at the expense of Ukrainian-language schools. After Ukraine obtained independence the trend was reversed. However, reintroduction of formal Ukrainian-language study has taken longer than expected. In some schools that have tried to switch to Ukrainian, part or most of the instruction is still given in Russian. In universities there are similar trends. In 1991/92 academic year, according to the Razumkov Centre, 49% of high school students were receiving their education in Ukrainian, and 50% in Russian.

As of 2024, the number of secondary schools in which education takes place exclusively in the Ukrainian language, in 2023 was 12,155 - 98.4%. In addition, 3,834,708 students - 99.1% - study Ukrainian. 447 schoolchildren (0.01%) continue to study in Russian at the level of the state language. In the 2022/2023 academic year, there were 1,362 of them. In 2022, the number of students studying Russian in schools decreased more than 100 times: from 454,800 in September 2021 to about 4,000 as of September 1, 2022. In 2023/2024, the number of schoolchildren studying the Russian language as a separate subject decreased another 5 times - to 768. The Russian language continues to be taught in 3 schools in Ukraine.

== Education of international students ==
Ukraine is a popular destination for education among Asian and African students. There are more than 63,000 students from 130 countries of the world now. A lot of non-government companies try to help students from all over the world apply to one of the universities in Ukraine. An example of this is the Ukrainian Educational Agency.

== During the Russian invasion ==
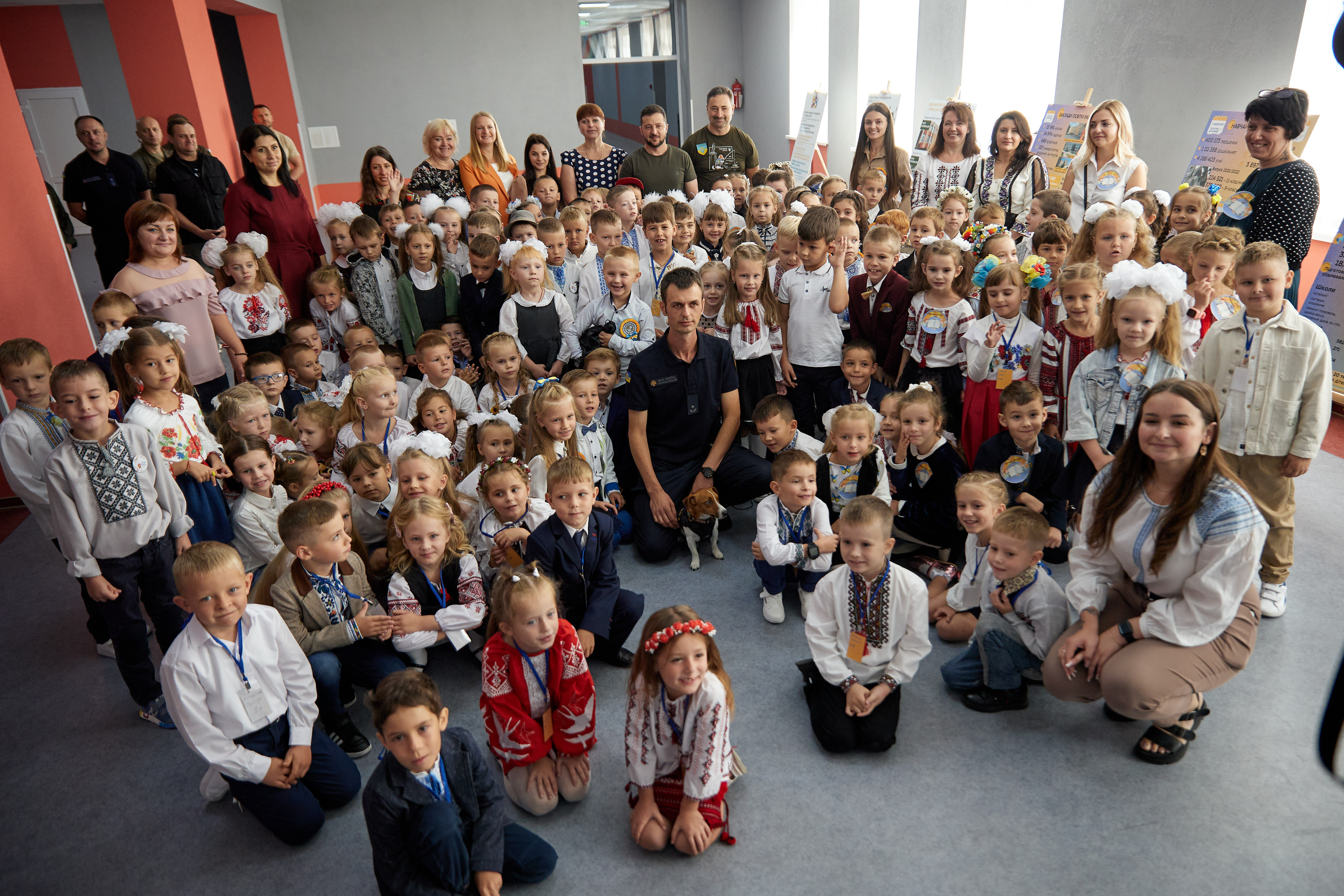
Ukrainian President Volodymyr Zelenskyy visiting a school in Irpin in Bucha Raion on the occasion of Knowledge Day on 1 September 2022

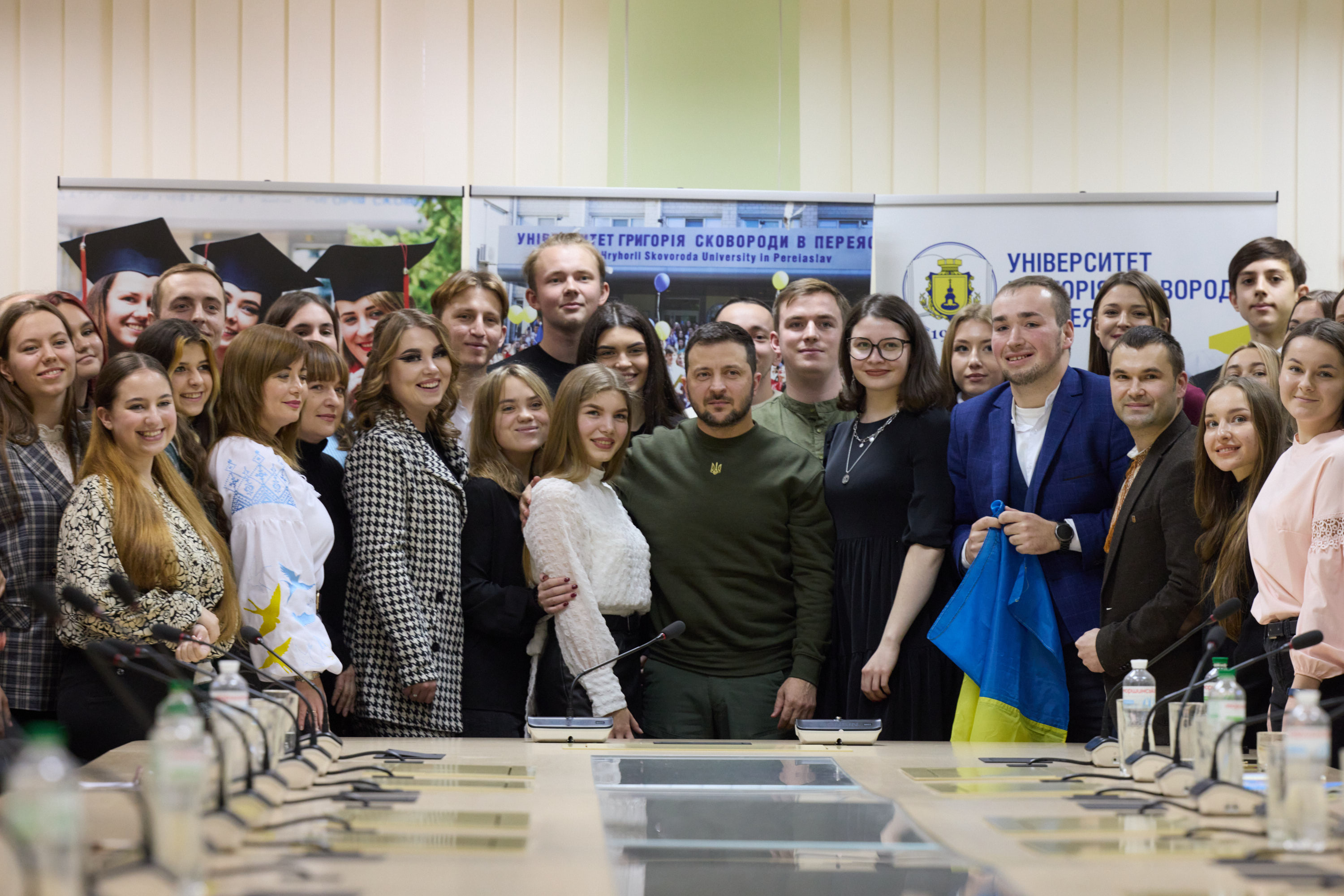
Zelenskyy with Ukrainian university students in Pereiaslav in December 2022

The education of about 5.5 million children was affected by the war with about 22 schools being attacked daily, per the Save the Children organization and official Ukrainian figures. A survey by the Ukrainian government estimated in June 2022 that 5.7 million school aged children aged between 3 and 18-years-old had been affected by the war and of those 2.8 million were displaced. In early April 2022, it was reported that at least 869 education facilities or about 6% of schools in Ukraine had been damaged, with about 83 completely destroyed and other classroom being used as emergency accommodation. Additionally there was a lack of teachers, which had been a concern prior to the invasion, but majorly teachers were female and became refugees elsewhere with their children.

The Ukrainian government paused all education for a few days when the war first broke out, before returning to online learning that had been the precedent from the COVID-19 pandemic, with some schools re-opening in person teaching by May 2022 in less affected areas. For the start of the 2022–2023 academic year many Ukrainian schools attempted to re-open for the school year, however many are heavily damaged from the war and lack safe locations for pupils and educators if the buildings come under attack. Per government regulations a schools shelter should be preferably be large enough to allow for the continuation of lessons, but if they cannot hold all enrolled pupils then the schools should offer part-time onsite and online learning for all enrolled students. About 51% of the schools in Ukraine planned to return to in-person education with online study if the parents preferred it, with any school without quick access to shelters or located close to borders with Russia or Belarus staying virtual.

In 2022 works by Russian and Soviet authors were removed from the foreign literature curriculum of Ukrainian schools.

In January 2023, the UNICEF said education for more than 5 million children was disrupted by the war in Ukraine. The use of explosive weapons in the conflict destructed thousands of schools and other educational buildings throughout Ukraine, especially those located in densely populated areas. The UNICEF urged for more support to ensure access to offline learning resources and supplies for children.

== Criticism ==
According to British economist Frances Cairncross (in April 2010), "Ukrainian education is too inward-looking, too corrupt and too poor to do a good job". According to Swedish economist Anders Åslund (in October 2012) the best parts of the Ukrainian education system are basic education in mathematics and science;

Ukrainian professor O. Bazaluk reports that the Ukrainian education provides for a student nothing more than an illusion of training. As a result, the majority of the Ukrainian graduates do not possess even a basic level of professional knowledge when they leave their schools. Due to extremely ineffective educational policy of the Ukrainian government and ubiquitous corruption the everyday life of the society has been significantly changed. The new developed qualities of the social transformation include aggression, rudeness, intolerance, boastfulness, reticence etc.

In 2013, the education system received the third highest percentage among Ukrainians of having given a bribe too with 33%.

== See also ==
- List of universities in Ukraine
- National Accreditation Agency of Ukraine
- Open access in Ukraine to scholarly communication
- National Academy of Educational Sciences of Ukraine
