= Pechersk School International =

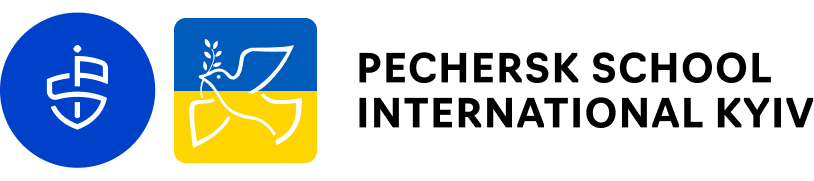
- Kyiv; Ukraine

Information
- Type: Private, International
- Motto: A Place Where We Belong
- Established: 1995
- Director: Trae Holland
- Primary school principal: Bryan Reardon
- Secondary school principal: David Freeman
- Faculty: 39
- Grades: Kindergarten - Grade 12
- Primary years taught: Kindergarten, 1st through 5th grades
- Secondary years taught: 6th through 12th grades
- Age range: 3-18 years old
- Enrollment: 140 total
- Average class size: 18 students
- Colours: Blue & White
- Mascot: Panther
- Accreditation: International Baccalaureate, New England Association of Schools and Colleges
- Website: enrol.psi.kyiv.ua

Pechersk School International (PSI) is a school located in Kyiv, Ukraine. It provides education ranging from the early childhood-level, to the end of the IB diploma-programme. PSI is a dynamic, diverse, not-for-profit international school community.

== History ==
The school was established in 1995 by a group of international parents (mainly diplomats and business people) keen to improve the quality of education for their children. At the time of its opening, the school had 47 students, ranging from preschoolers to 12th graders. The school campus was located at 17 Pavla Tychyny Street in Kyiv.

In 2000 PSI officially became an IB World School, offering three IB programmes. PSI is the only school in Ukraine to be accredited in three International Baccalaureate (IB) programmes. These include the Primary Years Programme (PYP), the Middle Years Programme (MYP), and the Diploma Programme (DP). The IB diploma is recognised by more than 2337 universities in over 90 countries.

In 2002, PSI received its first accreditation from the New England Association of Schools and Colleges (NEASC) and the Council of International Schools (CIS). In September 2003, the school moved to a new campus.

In 2017, the school completed the construction of its new Phase 2 building. In February 2022, PSI had to close its campus in Kyiv due to the full-scale war in Ukraine. By August 2022, PSI adapted by opening a temporary satellite campus in Warsaw, Poland, in partnership with the American School of Warsaw (ASW), while also offering online learning in collaboration with Avenues Online for students still in Ukraine.

In the spring of 2023, PSI's accreditation status was renewed by NEASC and IB through the Collaborative Learning Protocol process. In August 2023, the school resumed operations at its Kyiv campus.

=== Accreditations & Memberships ===
PSI has been accredited by the New England Association of Schools & Colleges (NEASC) in 2002 and received the most recent re-accreditation status in spring 2023. It is a current member of the Council of International Schools (CIS), European Council of International School (ECIS), Central and Eastern Schools Association (CEESA) and receives support from the US Department of State Office of Overseas Schools. Pechersk School International is the .only international school in Ukraine with approval from the Ukrainian School of External Studies to offer an additional general education programme accepted by the Ministry of Education of Ukraine. Students study a combination of classes offered by Ukrainian programme teachers and IB classes which are accepted by the Ukrainian Ministry of Education and Science.

== Faculty ==
The faculty at Pechersk School International consists of educators from 11 different nationalities. Faculty members average approximately 9.4 years of teaching experience, with around 9 years specifically in International Baccalaureate (IB) programmes. Seventy-seven percent of the faculty hold postgraduate degrees, and the international teaching staff comprises about 60% of the total team.

== Educational programmes ==
=== International Baccalaureate ===
The educational programs cover the learning and development process for students aged 3 to 19 and include:

- IB Primary Years Programme: an early years programme focused on primary education for students up to grade 5.
- IB Middle Years Programme: a middle education programme aimed at students from grades 6 to 10.
- IB Diploma Programme: a programme for obtaining a diploma that focuses on senior students in grades 11 and 12.

The IB diploma provides opportunities for higher education and is accepted and recognized by more than 2,337 universities in 90 countries around the world.

For students planning to pursue higher education at institutions in Ukraine, an additional educational program aligned with state standards and approved by the Ministry of Education and Science of Ukraine is offered.

=== Ukrainian School Programme ===
The Ukrainian school programme at Pechersk School International is offered at two levels:

1. First Level: Instruction is provided without final certification, and no educational document is issued in Ukraine (for students wishing to learn the Ukrainian language).
2. Second Level: Designed for students who want to receive a certificate of education in Ukraine, which includes:
  - Subject study
  - Completion of final certification
  - Receipt of an educational document in Ukraine

This programme includes additional subjects:

- Ukrainian language
- Ukrainian literature
- History of Ukraine
- Geography of Ukraine
- Law
- Defence of Ukraine

Instruction under this programme began on 1 September 2015. The educational process is conducted in an external form of education. Certificates of basic secondary education and full general secondary education are awarded based on the final scores of the IB programmes and marks from specified subjects within the Ukrainian component of the curriculum.

== Public activities ==
PSI collaborates with the Children of Heroes Foundation to support children who have lost parents in the war. Since 2024, the school has partnered with the foundation through its scholarship programme, providing educational opportunities to children affected by the war.. PSI launched the 'PSI 4 Good' initiative to support its school community and re-established a scholarship programme providing free access to education at PSI for children who lost one or more parents in the war.

== Russian invasion of Ukraine ==
Due to the war in Ukraine, the 2022 – 2023 academic year will find PSI provided in-person instruction to its students at a satellite campus in Warsaw, Poland as well as online instruction for its students living abroad. PSI will resume operations at its campus in Kyiv one the situation will allow its safe re-opening. PSI resumed operations at its campus in Kyiv in August 2023.

=== Satellite campus in Warsaw ===
In August 2022, PSI opened a new temporary satellite campus in Warsaw in partnership with the American School of Warsaw (ASW). This provided many opportunities for students to interact with ASW students, and to benefit from the ASW co-curricular programs, service learning opportunities, student events, such as dances etc. that PSI has always run in the past. The IB Diploma Program students, in addition to face-to-face learning, also have enhanced access to Pamoja courses, a recognised course provider by the International Baccalaureate, meaning that a rich variety of IB DP courses became available to them.

=== Return of the school to Kyiv ===
In August 2023, Pechersk School International returned to its campus in Kyiv, Ukraine. The school enrolled students from the United States, Italy, the United Kingdom, Israel, and Ukraine.

== Alumni ==
Most of its alumni go on to study in foreign universities. 33 students from the class of 2022, had university acceptances across 6 countries. Alumni of Pechersk School International go on to study at world's most elite universities, including Harvard University, Yale University, NYU and NYUAD, Yale-NUS College, Stanford University, King's College London, University of Edinburgh, and others. There is also an established alumni association, which holds reunions for former students and staff members both face-to-face and virtually. In 2019, reunions were held in New York and London.
