= International School of Prague =

The International School of Prague
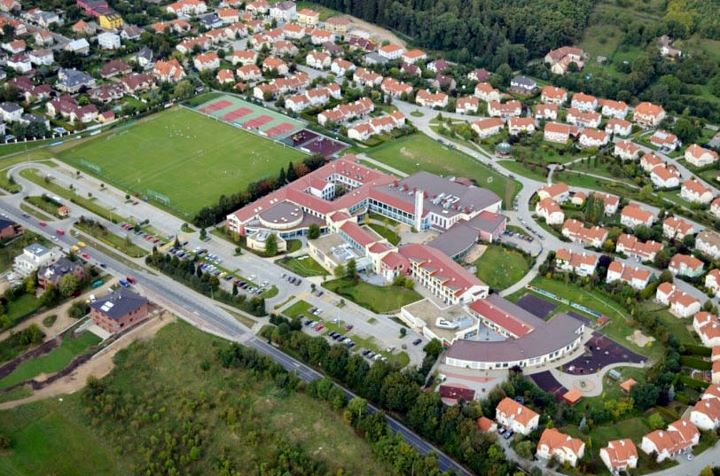
- Aerial view of the school, 2011

Location
- Nebušická 700; Praha 6, 164 00; Czech Republic; 50°06′40.536″N 14°20′30.44″E

Information
- School type: Private, non-profit, PK through 12th Grade
- Motto: Inspire Engage Empower
- Established: 1948
- School board: Erik Pettersson
- CEEB code: 719019
- Director: Dr. David Callaway
- Grades: PK3 - 12
- Age range: 3 to 18
- Enrollment: ca. 900
- Colours: Black & Yellow
- Athletics conference: Central and Eastern European Schools Association
- Mascot: Falcon
- Team name: The Falcons
- Affiliation: New England Association of Schools and Colleges and the Council of International Schools
- Website: Link

The International School of Prague (ISP) is an independent, English-speaking, non-profit, international school in Prague, Czech Republic.

Established in 1948, ISP is both the oldest and largest international school in the Czech Republic, with over 844 students representing more than 100 nationalities. ISP is accredited by the Council of International Schools (CIS) and the New England Association of Schools and Colleges (NEASC). The Czech Ministry of Education has also authorized the school to teach foreign nationals, in addition to Czech citizens. ISP offers its 11th and 12th grade students the opportunity to take the International Baccalaureate Diploma Program.

According to Czech tax law, ISP has only one shareholder, The International School of Prague Foundation, a US 501(c) organization. As a not-for-profit organization, any surpluses are re-invested in the school. The school's financial statements are externally audited and made available to the public. ISP is governed by a volunteer Board of Trustees, who also hire the director of the school. The current director is Dr. David Callaway.

== School life ==
ISP is divided into three sections: elementary school, middle school, and upper school, which are all located on the same campus. The school offers a large number of extra-curricular activities in the form of different clubs (such as Model United Nations, National Honor Society, jazz-band, and a variety of other student-led organizations) and sports teams. The school is a member of the Central and Eastern European Schools Association, competing against other member schools in sports such as association football (soccer), cross country running, tennis, volleyball, badminton, basketball, swimming and softball, as well as academic activities such as math competitions and Speech & Debate. The middle school and upper school also have active student councils that organize charity and entertainment events.

== History ==
In 1948 ISP (at the time called the English Speaking School of Prague) was founded in the Embassy of the United States, Prague. The school remained in the embassy until 1979, when it moved to a new location known as the "Little Hillside Campus". At the time, the school had 80 students in Pre-Kindergarten through 8th grade. By 1991, with the addition of more students and grade levels, the school was located in three different locations. From 1992 to 1994, 9th-12th grades were added, with the first ISP seniors graduating in 1995. Finally, in 1996, all classes were brought together on the current, custom-built campus in the village of Nebušice, in the Šárka valley, part of the Prague 6 district. In 1998 the school celebrated its fiftieth anniversary with an enrollment of 588 students. Ten years later, in celebration of its 60th anniversary, ISP underwent a 6.5 million euro renovation of the current campus.

== Noted alumni ==
- Winter Ave Zoli, actress
- Robbie Kay, actor
- Ekaterina Malysheva, designer and Hanoverian princess
