= International School of Belgrade =

Coordinates: 44.787622°N 20.434138°E

Location
- Temišvarska 19, Banjičkih Žrtava 6 Belgrade, Serbia; Senjak; Belgrade; Serbia

Information
- Established: 1948
- Principal: Mrs. Kristine Greenlaw, High School Principal and Mr. Warren Bowers, Lower School Principal
- Head of school: Dr. Robert Risch
- Grades: K-12
- Age range: 4-18
- Language: English
- Website: http://www.isb.rs

The International School of Belgrade is an independent, co-educational, international school in Belgrade, Serbia, located in the neighborhood of Senjak. In 2005 ISB joined the IB school system.

ISB follows the International Baccalaureate curriculum, with IB programs offered from Kindergarten to Grade 12. Instruction is in English, with the school split into two campuses, a Lower School (Kindergarten through Grade 5) and Middle and High School (Grade 6 through 12). The schools calendar runs from late August until mid June.

== Accreditation ==
The International School of Belgrade is accredited by the Council of International Schools (CIS), New England Association of Schools and Colleges (NEASC), and authorized by the International Baccalaureate Organization (IBO), and the Serbian Ministry of Education, Science and Technological Development.

- Council of International Schools
- New England Association of Schools and Colleges
- International Baccalaureate Organization

== Students and faculty ==
The school has 384 students from 45 countries. There are currently as of the 2013-2014 School Year, 187 Lower School students, 101 Middle School students, and 97 High School students. ISB employs 74 Faculty, Teaching Assistants, and Specialists representing 10 nationalities with experience ranging from 3 to over 30 years.

== Facilities ==
ISB moved into its current high school campus in 2003, with grades 6-12. In 2005 grade 6-8 moved to a new building nearby. However starting January 2012 ISB's Middle School returned to the now renovated campus, fit with a new state of the art Gymnasium and Amphitheatre.

== Extracurricular activities ==
ISB offers a large scale of after-school programs divided into three seasons: Autumn, Winter and Spring. ISB is a member of CEESA which allows older students, (Grades 6-12) to take part in events alongside students from other international schools in central and Eastern Europe. ISB competes in Soccer, Basketball and Volleyball, as well as Knowledge Bowl, and Math Counts.
