= List of schools in Israel =

This is list of schools in Israel.

| District | City or Regional council | School | Grades | Website |
|---|---|---|---|---|
| Northern District | Lower Galilee | Kadoorie Agricultural High School | 7–12 | |
| Northern District | Lower Galilee | Mar Elias Educational Institutions | K–12 | |
| Haifa District | Haifa | Hebrew Reali School | K–12 | |
| Central District | Even Yehuda | Walworth Barbour American International School | Preschool–12 | |
| Central District | Herzliya | Handasaim Herzliya High School | 7–12 | |
| Central District | Lod | New Arab High School | | |
| Central District | Ra'anana | Mor Metro-West High School | | |
| Central District | Hod HaSharon | Mosenson Youth Village | 9–12 | |
| Central District | Petah Tikva | Ben Gurion High School | 7–12 | |
| Central District | Rehovot | De Shalit High School | 7–12 | |
| Central District | Rishon LeZion | Gymnasia Realit | 10–12 | |
| Central District | Rishon LeZion | Haviv Elementary School | 1–6 | |
| Tel Aviv District | Holon | Collège-Lycée franco-israélien Raymond Leven | 7–12 | |
| Tel Aviv District | Ramat HaSharon | HaKfar HaYarok | 7–14 | |
| Tel Aviv District | Tel Aviv | Collège des Frères de Jaffa | 1–12 | |
| Tel Aviv District | Tel Aviv | Herzliya Hebrew Gymnasium | 7–12 | |
| Tel Aviv District | Tel Aviv | Meron School | 1–6 | |
| Tel Aviv District | Tel Aviv | Shevah Mofet | 7–12 | |
| Jerusalem District | Jerusalem | Hebrew University Secondary School | 7–12 | |
| Jerusalem District | Jerusalem | Rehavia Gymnasium | 7–12 | |
| Jerusalem District | Jerusalem | Hartman High School | 7–12 | |
| Jerusalem District | Jerusalem | Yashlatz | | |
| Jerusalem District | Jerusalem | Jerusalem Studio School | | |
| Jerusalem District | Jerusalem | Pelech | | |
| Jerusalem District | Jerusalem | Ein Kerem Agricultural School | | |
| Jerusalem District | Jerusalem | Jerusalem American International School | PreK–12 | |
| Southern District | Sderot | Yeshivat Hesder of Sderot | | |
