= Alon Friedman =

Israeli neuroscientist

- אלון פרידמן
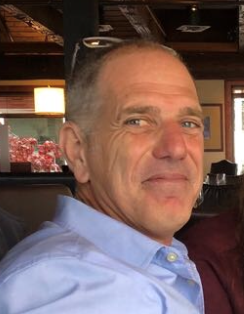
- Prof. Alon Friedman
- Born: October 9, 1964 (age 61); Jaffa, Israel
- Education: Ben-Gurion University of the Negev
- Known for: The link between Blood–brain barrier disruption and epilepsy
- Scientific career
- Fields: Translational neuroscience
- Workplaces: Ben-Gurion University of the Negev, Dalhousie University
- Doctoral advisor: Michael Gutnick

Alon Friedman (Hebrew: אלון פרידמן) is a professor of Neuroscience at both Ben-Gurion University of the Negev (BGU) in Beersheba, Israel, and in Dalhousie University, Halifax, Nova Scotia, Canada. He is best known for his discoveries of the link between blood–brain barrier (BBB) disruption and Epileptogenesis (development of epilepsy) and the mechanisms underlying it, and for the utilization of BBB imaging as a potential Biomarker of epilepsy and other brain diseases.

== Biography ==
Friedman was born in Jaffa, Israel. Graduated from Handasaim Herzliya High School at his former campus in Tel Aviv. He earned both MD and PhD (Under the supervision of Prof. Michael Gutnick) degrees at BGU (1991), Faculty of health sciences as an Atuda cadet. While serving as an army doctor he began his ongoing collaboration with Prof. Hermona Soreq and Prof. Daniela Kaufer. After this term he joined the residency program at the neurosurgical department in Soroka Medical Center (1997). After a while (2002), he went to Berlin, Germany for a period as a guest scientist at Charité Medical University and established a long-lasting collaboration with Uwe Heinemann. Then he came back to his alma mater at BGU where he became a full professor in 2012, and from 2014 he is an acting principal investigator and a full professor in both Dalhousie University, Faculty of Medicine and BGU.

== Scientific career ==
In his early career, while being an army doctor and collaborating with Prof. Soreq and Prof. Kaufer, Friedman made his first discoveries regarding the functioning of the cholinergic system under stress conditions. he began to challenge the hypothesis that BBB disruption, as a common implication of multiple epilepsy inducing conditions such as stroke and traumatic brain injury, serves as a mechanistic factor in epileptogenesis. He went to Berlin to establish a novel model of epilepsy which enabled him to show causality for the first time between BBB disruption and epileptogenesis. Then, in collaboration with Prof. Kaufer he exposed that albumin, the most frequent protein in the serum is the agent that leaks from the blood into the brain parenchyma under BBB disruption conditions and induces epileptogenesis by activation of the transforming growth factor beta receptor on astrocytes. Furthermore, they showed that this process is mediated by a unique inflammatory pattern and the formation of excitatory synapses. In sought of a cure or a preventive means for this devastating process, they found that losartan, a commonly used drug for hypertension treatment may prevent epilepsy and facilitate BBB healing. This line of discoveries was facilitated by the development of a novel method for direct imaging of the BBB in-vivo and promoted the investigation of the mechanism of seizure induced BBB disruption and the impairment of neurovascular coupling during seizure. Nowadays, much of his research group attention is devoted to translation of the animal findings into the clinical practice. The development of a BBB imaging method in human enabled the group's pioneering discovery of BBB disruption among players of American football and raised the hypothesis that BBB disruption is the link between repeated traumatic brain injury and Chronic traumatic encephalopathy. Understanding that clinical trials in possible antiepileptogenic agents (e.g. losartan) or BBB healing drugs necessitate biomarkers for patients selection and treatment-followup inspired investigations that found BBB disruption as a potential biomarker of stroke and specific EEG patterns as predictors of epilepsy

== Awards ==
He was awarded the international league against epilepsy Michael Prize for Epilepsy Research in 2007.
