= List of schools in the Ottoman Empire =

Notable primary and secondary schools during the Ottoman Empire included:

== Adana Vilayet ==
- Tarsus American College

== Adrianople (Edirne) Vilayet ==
- Adrianople (Edirne)
  - Bulgarian Men's High School of Adrianople

== Aidin Vilayet ==
- Smyrna (now İzmir)
  - American Collegiate Institute
  - American Boys’ School
  - İzmir Özel Saint-Joseph Fransız Lisesi
- Manisa
  - Or Yehuda Agriculture School

== Beirut Vilayet ==
- Beirut
  - American Community School Beirut
  - Collège Notre Dame de Jamhour
  - Collège de la Sagesse
  - Grand Lycée Franco-Libanais
  - Lycée Abdel Kader
- Mount Lebanon Mutasarrifate (now in Lebanon)
  - Brummana High School in Brummana
  - Collège Saint Joseph – Antoura in Antoura
  - International School of Choueifat – Lebanon in Choueifat

== Constantinople (Istanbul) Vilayet ==
- Constantinople (modern name: Istanbul and all now in Turkey)
  - American Academy for Girls (now Üsküdar American Academy)
  - Berberian School
  - Deutsche Schule Istanbul
  - Lycée de Galatasaray
  - Getronagan Armenian High School
  - Great National School (Megalē tou Genous scholē)
  - İnas İdadisi (İnas Sultanisi) (Currently Istanbul Girls High School)
  - Kuleli Military High School
  - Liceo Italiano di Istanbul
  - Lycée Notre Dame de Sion Istanbul
  - Lycée Saint-Benoît d'Istanbul/Saint Benoît Fransız Lisesi
  - Lycée Saint-Joseph, Istanbul
  - Lycée Français Saint Michel/Özel Saint Michel Fransız lisesi
  - Robert College
  - Istanbul International Community School (Formerly Robert College Community School)
  - St. George's Austrian High School
  - Zappeion - Established in 1875, it was a school for girls catering to the Greek population. Ayşe Sıdıka Hanım, an ethnic Turk, attended this school. Johann Strauss, author of "Language and power in the late Ottoman Empire," described it as "prestigious".

== Erzurum Vilayet ==
- Erzurum
  - Sanasarian College

== Kayseri Sanjak ==
- Talas American College

== Mamuret-ul-Aziz Vilayet ==
- Harput (now in Elazığ)
  - Euphrates College

== Mutasarrifate of Jerusalem ==
- Jaffa
  - Collège des Frères de Jaffa
  - Mikveh Israel
- Jerusalem
  - Talitha Kumi School (moved to Beit Jala, State of Palestine)
  - Schmidt's Girls College (now in East Jerusalem, under Israeli administration)
- Ramallah
  - Ramallah Friends Schools

== Monastir Vilayet ==
- Monastir (Bitola)
  - Monastir Military High School

== Salonica (Thessaloniki) Vilayet ==
- Salonika (Thessaloniki)
  - American Farm School
  - Bulgarian Men's High School of Thessaloniki
  - French School of Thessaloniki
  - German School of Thessaloniki

== Sivas Vilayet ==
- Merzifon
  - Anatolia College in Merzifon

== See also ==
- Education in the Ottoman Empire

For areas formerly part of the empire:

- List of schools in Bulgaria
- List of schools in Greece
- List of schools in Israel
- List of schools in Jordan
- List of schools in Lebanon
- List of schools in Saudi Arabia (for the Hejaz)
- List of schools in Syria
- List of high schools in Turkey
  - List of high schools in Istanbul
