= Istanbul International Community School =

- Istanbul; Turkey

Information
- Former name: Robert College Community School (RCCS)
- Type: International, Independent
- Religious affiliation: None
- Founded: 1911; 115 years ago
- CEEB code: 696160
- Head of School: Nicolaas Mostert
- Faculty: 75
- Grades: 1-12
- Gender: Co-educational
- Age range: 3-18
- Enrollment: 525 (August 2018)
- Student to teacher ratio: 7:1
- Education system: IB PYP; IB MYP; IB DP
- Language: English
- Campuses: Hisar; Marmara
- Campus size: 0.5 acres (2048 m^{2}); 40 acres (16 hectares)
- Campus type: Urban; Suburban
- Student council: StuCo
- Athletics conference: CEESA
- Mascot: Dolphin
- Nickname: Dolphins
- Accreditation: Council of International Schools; International Baccalaureate; NEASC
- Annual tuition: $16,398 to $33,866 (2034-24)
- Affiliation: CEESA; College Board; ECIS; ISA
- Website: www.iics.k12.tr

Istanbul International Community School (also known as IICS) is one of the oldest international schools in the world and the first established in Istanbul. It was one of the first schools in the world authorized to offer all three International Baccalaureate programs.

Founded in 1911, the independent, non-profit, non-sectarian school offers co-ed K–12 education. As of August 2018, the school's total enrollment was 525, with more than 60 nationalities represented. Due to legal requirements, only holders of non-Turkish passports are eligible to apply to the school.

== History ==
IICS was founded in 1911 during the reign of Sultan Mehmed V in the Ottoman Empire. The school was initially named Robert College Community School (RCCS) and served as the sister school to Robert College (RC) for the education of RC faculty members' children. Initially, the school was located in Anderson Hall, which was then part of Robert College and is now part of Boğaziçi University. The land was bought by Robert College founder Cyrus Hamlin from Ahmed Vefik Pasha in 1861. During World War I and II, RCCS was temporarily closed on multiple occasions.

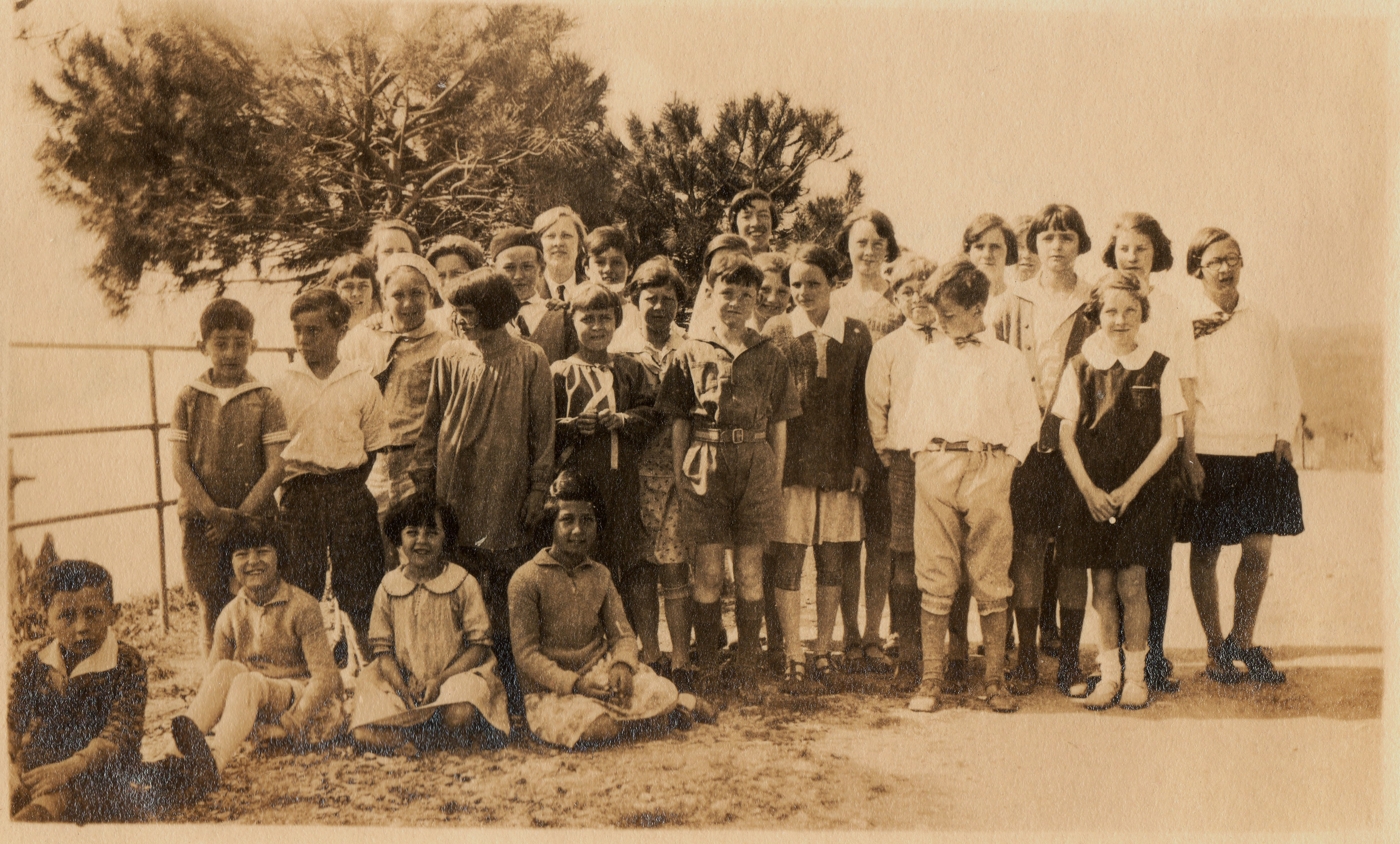
The RCCS student body in 1928.

In 1958, RCCS moved to the Grosvenor House near the present-day Hisar Campus. The house was named after Gilbert Hovey Grosvenor, who was born in the house, and whose father Edwin taught at Robert College. The school remained primarily in the Grosvenor House until it burned down on 18 December 1985. RCCS was renamed Istanbul International Community School in 1979 to reflect that it was now open to all expatriate students.

The primary building at the Hisar Campus, known as the White House, was originally built for an English merchant family in the early 20th century. The house had first been used in the 1969–70 academic year. The ginkgo tree still found at the Early Years playground here is believed to be the first ginkgo tree in Turkey, and originally arrived from London's Kew Gardens.

== Campuses ==
=== Hisar Campus ===
The school features two campuses, including the smaller Hisar Campus, which is part of the school's original grounds and is situated closer to the city center. The 2048 m^{2} wooded campus overlooks the Rumelian Castle (Turkish: Rumeli Hisarı) in the city's Sarıyer district and serves students from preschool to grade 3. Facilities include a library, PE and music room, rubberized basketball court, football pitch, climbing wall, and two playgrounds.

=== Marmara Campus ===
The school's primary, purpose-built campus is located 25 miles (40 km) west of the city center in Karaağaç, Büyükçekmece. The 16 hectare (40 acre) campus which opened in 1999 caters to approximately 75% of the student body and is home to 30+ classrooms and a separate Early Years building. An automated library & media center, music rooms with practice studios, a purpose-built art atelier, a theater and outdoor amphitheater, 2 gymnasiums, outdoor basketball & tennis courts, and a regulation-sized sports pitch are available for use.

== Curriculum ==
As the school is authorized and accredited by the International Baccalaureate, the three years of Early Years (3, 4, 5) and grades 1-6 are taught through the IB Primary Years Programme. Grades 7-10 follow the IB Middle Years Programme, and grades 11-12 follow the IB Diploma Programme.

English is the language of instruction and the overall curriculum is international in nature. Turkish language and culture is taught, while students can choose either French, Spanish, or German to study as a foreign language. For students who have not yet achieved satisfactory English fluency, English for Speakers of Other Languages (ESOL) is offered instead of French/Spanish/German.

Technology is widely integrated into the curriculum with iPads being used through grade 1 and MacBooks being used from grade 2. All classrooms feature interactive whiteboards.

== Accreditations and affiliations ==
IICS has been globally accredited by the Council of International Schools since 1997, the New England Association of Schools and Colleges since 2002, and the International Baccalaureate since 1996. The school was last re-accredited through a joint evaluation by CIS and NEASC in May 2018.

IICS is also a member of the Central and Eastern European Schools Association, the College Board, the European Council of International Schools and the Educational Records Bureau.

== Organization ==
IICS is a U.S. registered 501(c)(3) nonprofit organization and is governed by an elected board of directors.

The school is partially sponsored by the United States Department of State's Office of Overseas Schools.

== See also ==
- Robert College
- Education in the Ottoman Empire
- List of schools in the Ottoman Empire
- List of high schools in Turkey
- List of high schools in Istanbul
- List of international schools
- International Baccalaureate (IB)
- Central and Eastern European Schools Association (CEESA)
- New England Association of Schools and Colleges (NEASC)
- College Board
- Educational Records Bureau
- United States Department of State
