= International School of Helsinki =

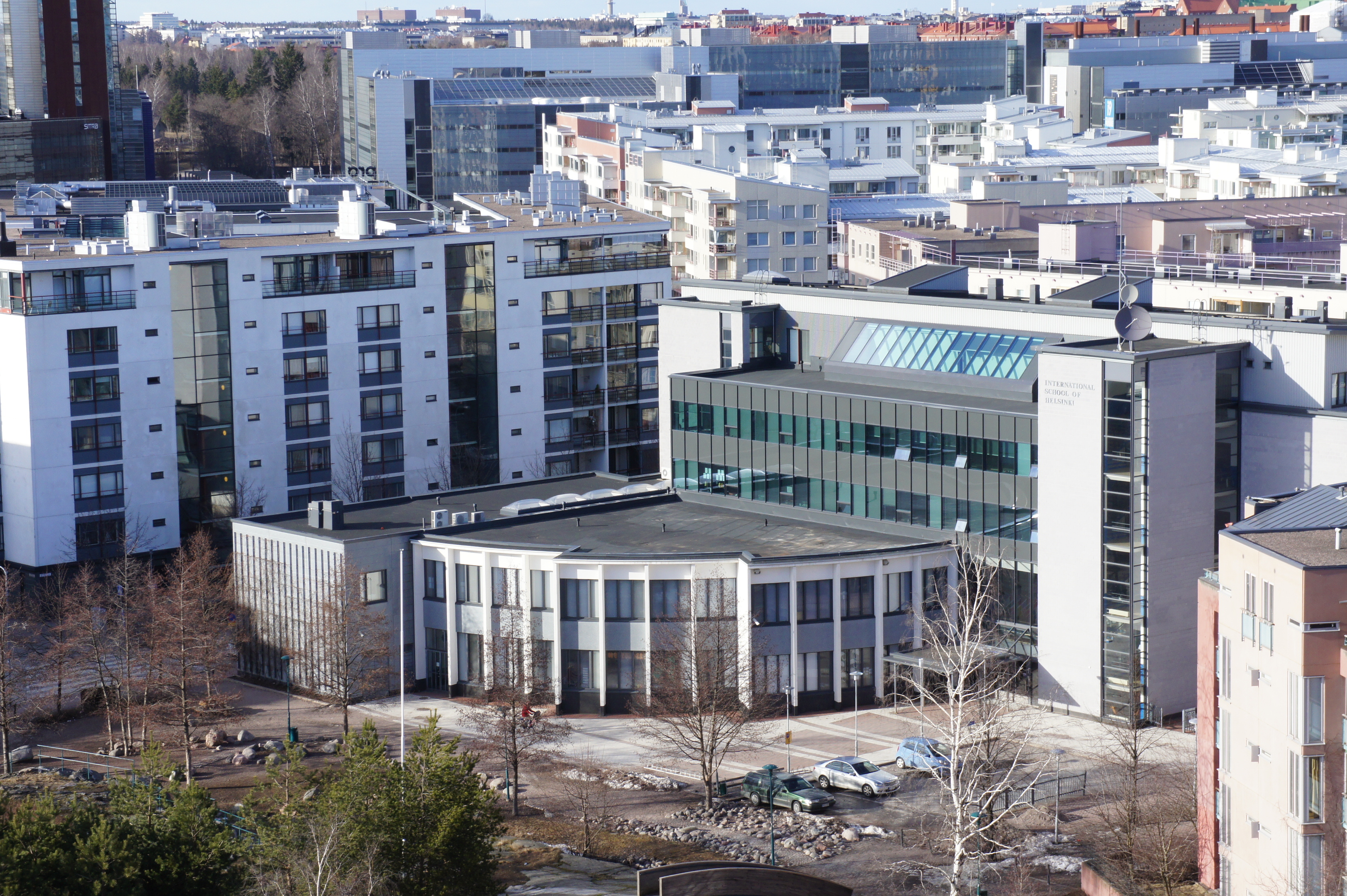

Location
- Selkämerenkatu 11; Jätkäsaari; Helsinki; Finland
- Coordinates: 60°9′38″N 24°54′56″E

Information
- Established: 1963
- Head of school: Dr. Mónica Gilbert-Sáez
- Grades: K–12
- Age range: 3–18
- Enrollment: 505
- Language: English
- Website: ishelsinki.fi

The International School of Helsinki (ISH) is an international school in Helsinki, Finland, and founded as the British Preparatory School in 1963.

The ISH is an International Baccalaureate World School, with IB programs offered from Kindergarten to Grade 12. The school was first authorized to offer the IB Diploma program in 1993. Instruction is in English, with the school divided into a Lower School (Kindergarten through Grade 5) and Upper School (Grades 6–12).

The school has a full-day program. Its school years run from early August to early June.

== Accreditation and authorization ==
=== Accreditation ===
In addition to the International Baccalaureate, the school is also accredited by the following organizations:

- New England Association of Schools and Colleges
- Council of International Schools

=== Authorization ===
ISH became the first school in Finland fully authorized to offer all three of the International Baccalaureate Programme: the Primary Years Programme (PYP), the Middle Years Programme (MYP), and the Diploma Programme in November 2005.

The school's strategic plan, the philosophies of the International Baccalaureate Programmes, along with the Finnish education regulations and the standards set forth by the accrediting agencies mentioned above all contribute to the structure and operation of ISH.

== Structure ==
The school has approximately 500 students of whom some 28% are Finnish nationals. The rest of the school's population is made up of different nationalities. The school is divided into two sections:

=== ISH Lower School ===
- 1 Programme: Primary Years Programme (PYP), Pre-School and Grades 1-5.

=== ISH Upper School ===
- 2 Programmes:
  - Middle Years Programme (MYP), Grades 6-10.
  - Diploma Programme (DP), Grades 11 and 12.

All three programs share the same campus.

=== Administration ===
The school is administered by a Board of Governors elected by the ISH Parents Association to two-year terms.

== Facilities ==
ISH moved into its purpose-built structure in the Ruoholahti district of Helsinki in 1996. The school's facilities include ICT labs, a gymnasium, a sports field, a library, and a media center as well as classrooms equipped with Smart-Boards and other media devices. The school also has a combined cafeteria/auditorium.

== Extracurricular activities ==
The International School of Helsinki offers a variety of activities. The After School Activities (ASA) Programme is divided into three seasons: Autumn, Winter, and Spring. The intended goal of the ASA Programme is to offer students both competitive and non-competitive activities and athletics options. The school is a member of CEESA which allows older students to take part in events alongside students from other international schools in central and Eastern Europe. These include various sports events including soccer, basketball, and volleyball tournaments.

Lower School students have a variety of clubs to choose from, which include arts, comics, dancing, drama, games, music, and various sports.
