= Tashkent International School =

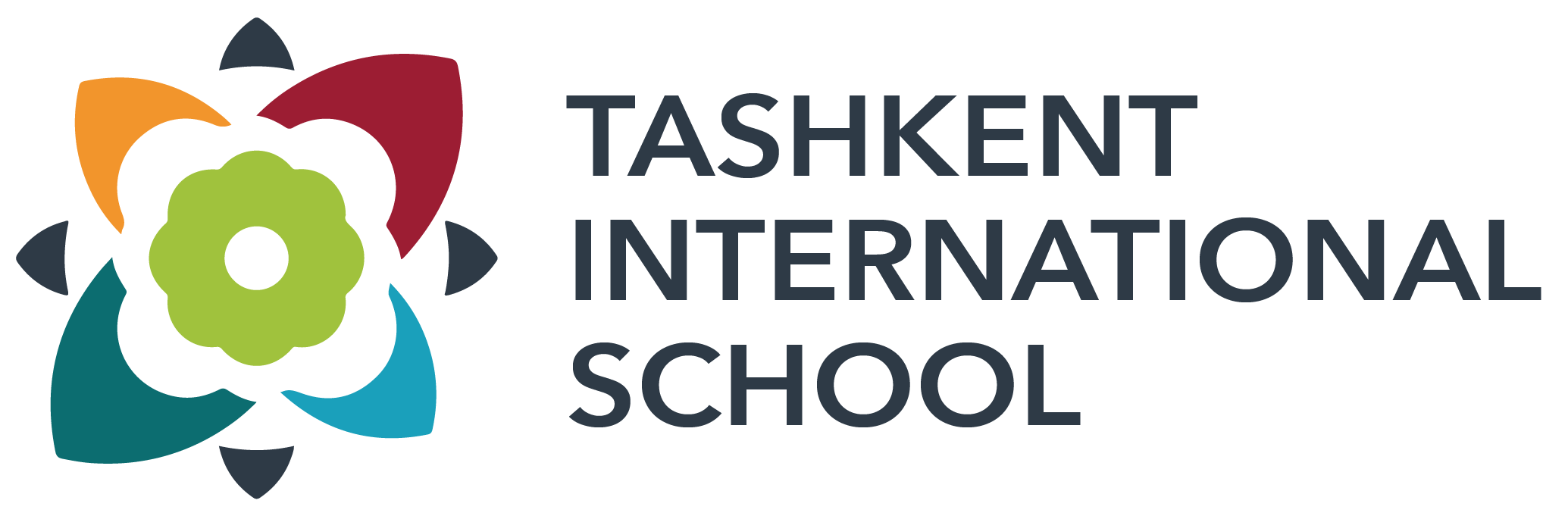

Location
- 38, Sarakulskaya Street; Tashkent, Uzbekistan, 100005
- Coordinates: 41.2697148°N 69.294768°E

Information
- School type: International
- Established: 1994
- Director: Bill Kralovec
- Grades: Early Childhood to Grade 12
- Gender: Coeducational
- Enrollment: Approximately 500 students
- Athletics: Cross Country, Football, Basketball, Volleyball, Track and Field, Tennis, Badminton, Gymnastics
- Athletics conference: CEESA, CAFA (Central Asia Federation of Activities, Athletics and Art), Owls Invitational
- Mascot: Owls
- Accreditation: New England Association of Schools and Colleges, Council of International Schools, International Baccalaureate
- Website: www.tashschool.org

Tashkent International School (TIS) is an International Baccalaureate (IB) World School located in Tashkent, the capital city of Uzbekistan in Central Asia. TIS was founded in 1994 to provide education in English for children of the diplomatic corps, international corporations and local families.
