= Konstancin-Jeziorna =

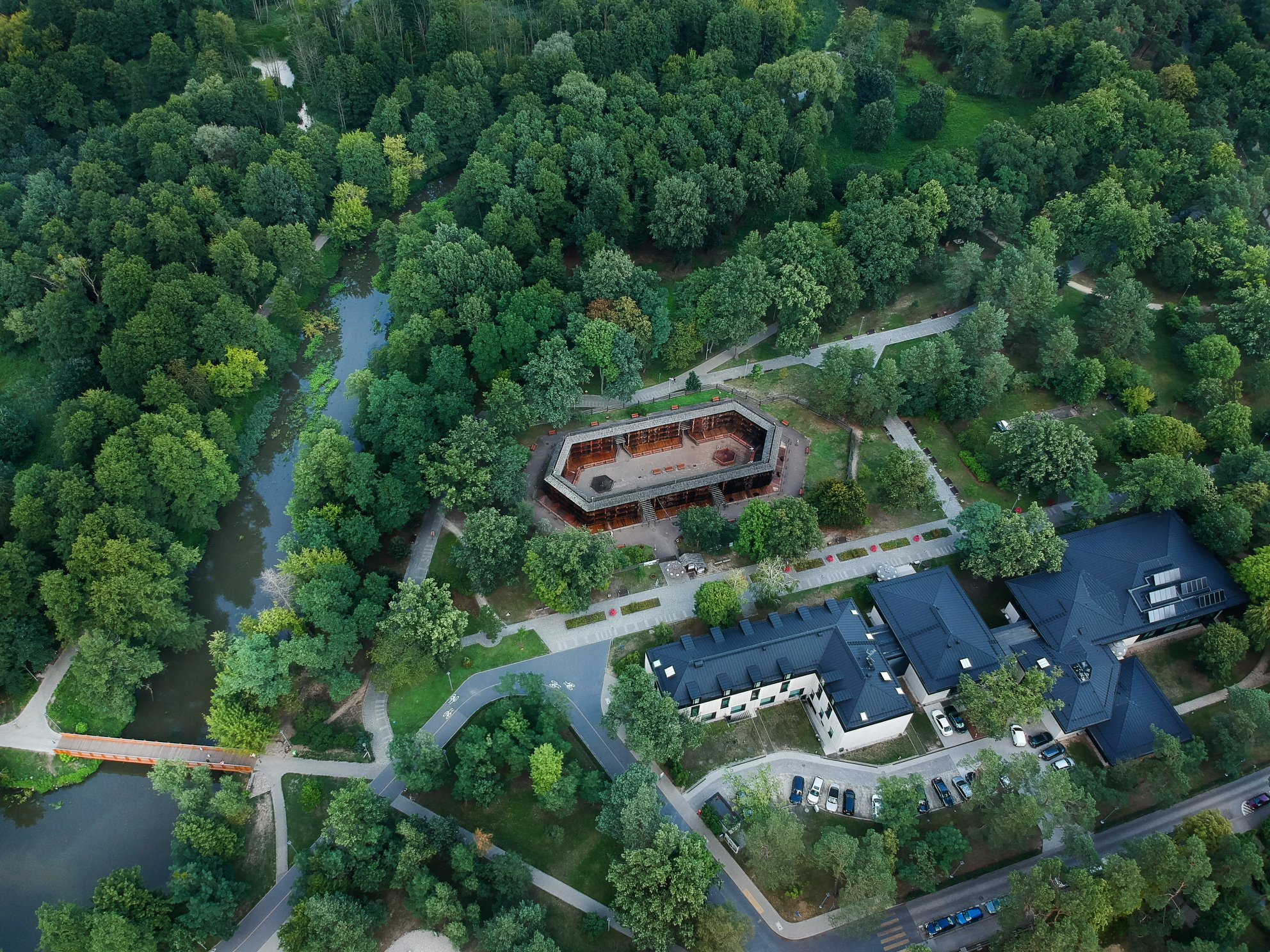
- Spa Park in Konstancin-Jeziorna

- Flag Coat of arms

- Location within Poland
- Coordinates: 52°5′N 21°7′E
- Country: Poland
- Voivodeship: Masovian
- County: Piaseczno
- Gmina: Konstancin-Jeziorna
- Town rights: 1969

Government
  - Mayor: Michał Wiśniewski (PO)

Area
  - Total: 17.1 km^{2} (6.6 sq mi)
- Highest elevation: 100 m (330 ft)
- Lowest elevation: 75 m (246 ft)

Population (2011)
  - Total: 17,566
  - Density: 1,030/km^{2} (2,660/sq mi)
- Time zone: UTC+1 (CET)
  - Summer (DST): UTC+2 (CEST)
- Postal code: 05-510, 05-520
- Area code: +48 22
- Car plates: WPI
- Website: www.konstancinjeziorna.pl

Konstancin-Jeziorna [kɔnˈstaɲt͡ɕin jɛˈʑɔrna] is a spa town in Piaseczno County, Masovian Voivodeship, Poland, with 17,566 inhabitants (as of March 2011, according to GUS). It is located about 20 km (12 mi) south of downtown Warsaw and is a part of the Warsaw metropolitan area.

The town was created in 1969 through combining neighbouring towns: holiday resort Skolimów-Konstancin and industrial Jeziorna with a number of villages.

The town, a 19th-century health spa, sits on the administrative border of the capital city, Warsaw. The town is known for its historic villas as well as newly built mansions, a shopping center in a restored 19th-century mill and is the home of the American School of Warsaw.

== Klarysew ==
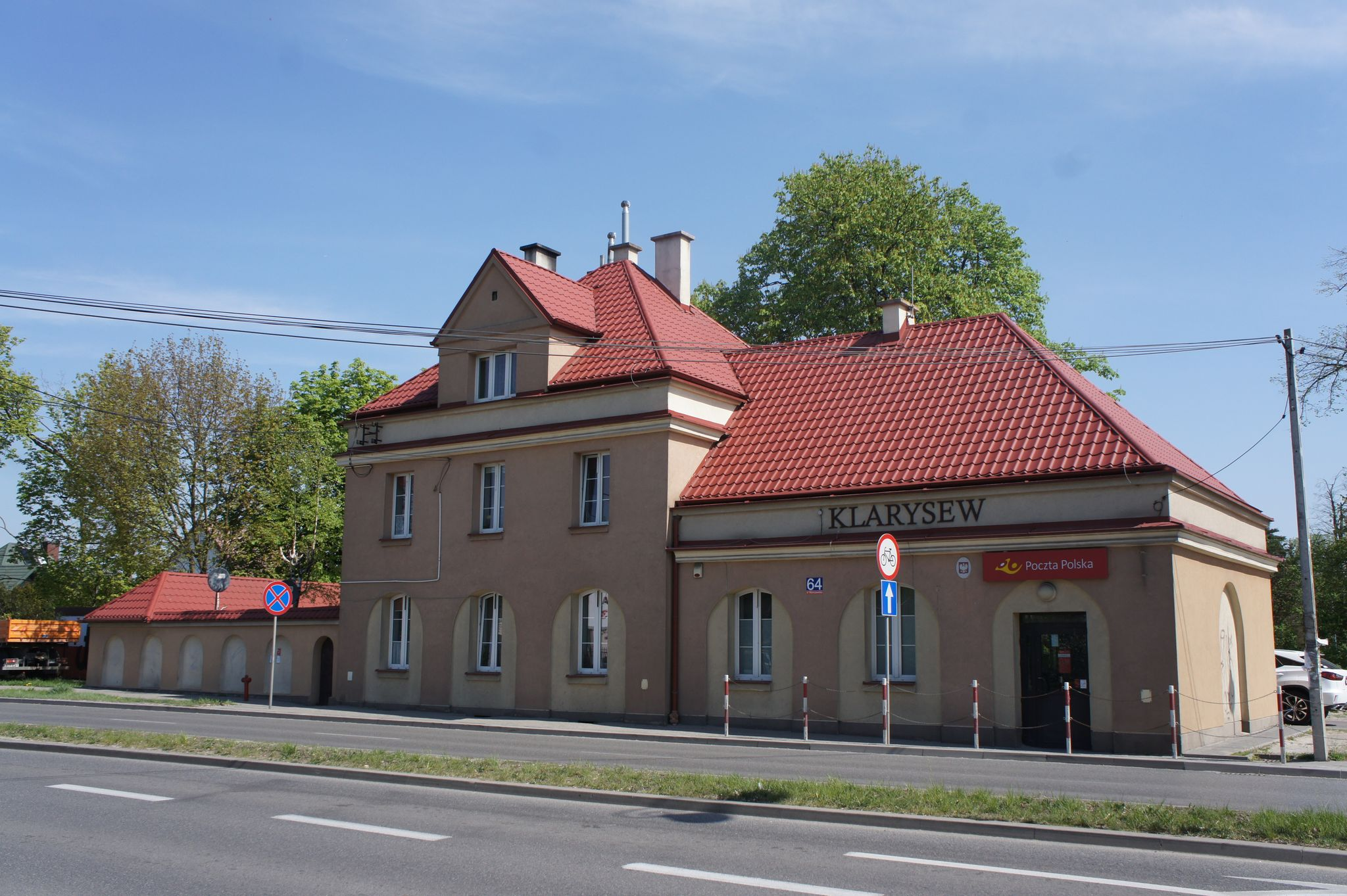
Post office in Klarysew

There is a district in the town called Klarysew. In the years 1867 - 1954, it was a settlement in the commune of Jeziorna in the Warsaw County. On October 20, 1933, Klarysew formed a cluster within the boundaries of the Jeziorna commune, consisting of the Klarysew settlement and the Bielawa pod Górami settlement.

During World War II, it was occupied by Germany, administratively part of the General Government, in the Warsaw District. In 1943, Klarysew had 1,353 inhabitants.

From July 1, 1952 it was part of Piaseczno County. Due to the reorganization of the rural administration in the autumn of 1954, Klarysew became part of the Jeziorna Królewska community, together with Gawrońiec, Jeziorna Fabryczna, Jeziorna Królewska, Konstancinek, a plot of Obory and a piece of the town of Skolimów-Konstancin.

On January 1, 1956, the Jeziorna Królewska cluster was transformed into a housing estate called Jeziorna, which made Klarysew an integral part of Konstancin-Jeziorna, and due to the granting of city rights to Jeziorna on July 18, 1962 - part of the city. On January 1, 1969, Jeziorna was combined with Skolimów-Konstancin (municipal rights in 1962) into a new urban center named Konstancin-Jeziorna.

The Wilanów railway station from the second half of the 19th century, located at 64 Warszawska Street, has been preserved in the district (since 2010, there is a branch of the post office No. 4). The station, like the Warszawa Wilanów station, was designed by Konstanty Jakimowicz.

Klarysew was popular among the political elite of the Polish People's Republic and some leading officials such as Edward Gierek had their houses there.

== Sports ==
Konstancin-Jeziorna has a football team named Kosa Konstancin created by former professional footballer Roman Kosecki.

== International relations ==
=== Twin towns – Sister cities ===
Konstancin-Jeziorna is twinned with:

- Leidschendam-Voorburg, Netherlands
- Pisogne, Italy
- Saint-Germain-en-Laye, France
- Denzlingen, Germany
- Hranice, Czech Republic
- Kremenets, Ukraine
- Naujoji Vilnia, Lithuania
