= International School of Azerbaijan =

The International School of Azerbaijan
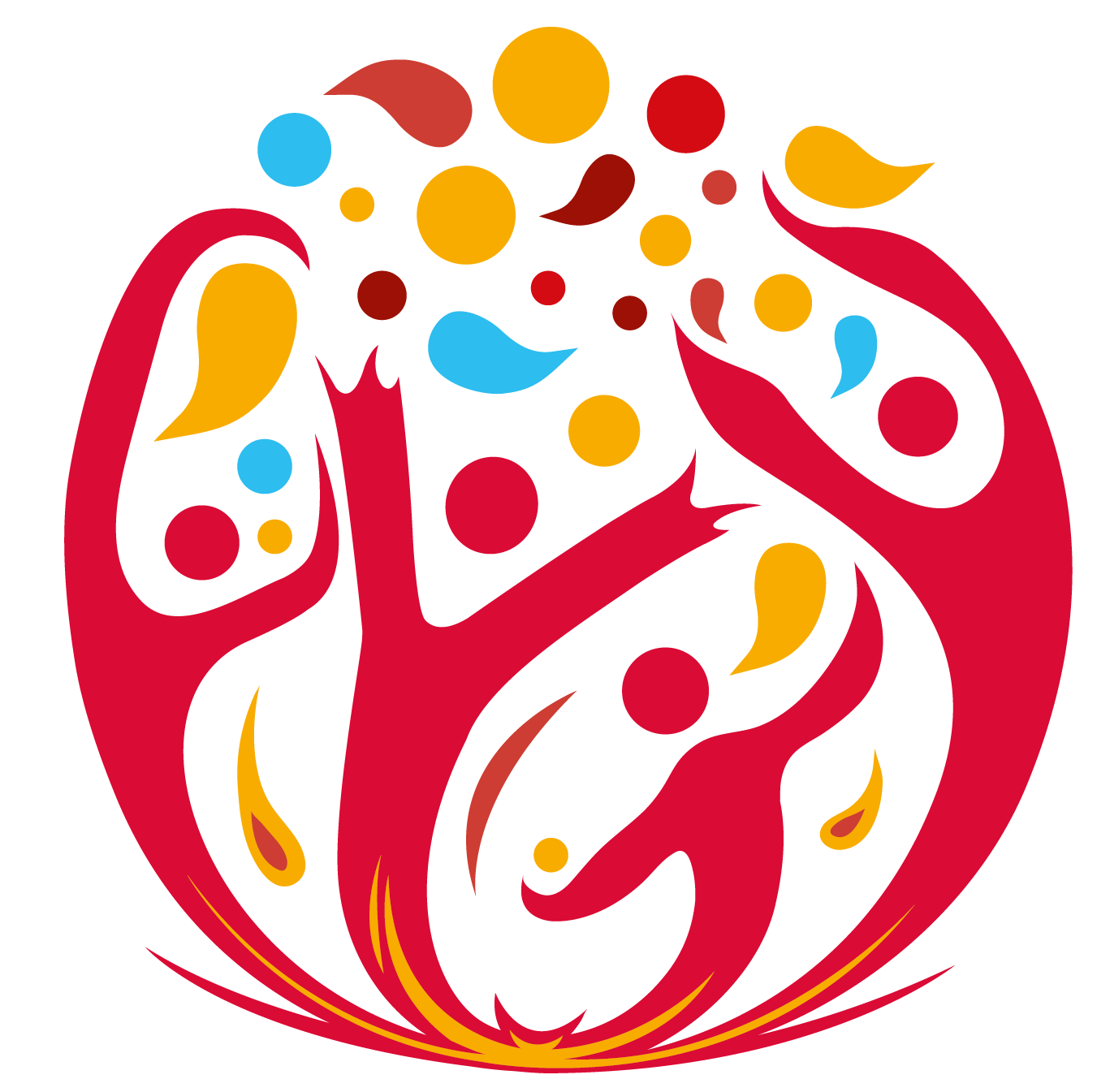
- Baku, AZ1070; Azerbaijan

Information
- School type: International
- Established: 1996
- Director: Helen Brockelsby.
- Principal: Brianne Eddy-Lee (primary), Jarrod Dale (secondary)
- Enrollment: over 600 students
- Website: www.tisa.az

The International School of Azerbaijan (TISA) is a secular college-preparatory international day school in Baku, Azerbaijan. It was founded in 1996 and admits pupils between the age of 2 and 18. The school is located in a purpose-built facility in a residential community on the outskirts of Baku.

The school provides an English-medium curriculum based on the International Baccalaureate and offers IB Primary Years, Middle Years, and Diploma Programmes. It is accredited by the Azerbaijani Education Ministry and the IBO. TISA serves both the expatriate and local community, and the school mandates Azerbaijani language for domestic students.

Students take part in a variety of Central & Eastern European Schools Association (CEESA) and other International events each school year. These include sports like football, basketball, swimming and volleyball. They also partake in extracurricular activity events such as Speech and Debate and Model United Nations. Each year, TISA hosts international events.

== Clubs ==
TISA officially has football, volleyball and basketball clubs. There are student-created clubs too, which include an MUN Club, a baseball club a chess club, an SAT Club, media club, and a coding club.

== Student body ==
TISA officially has a democratically-elected and highly-active Student Council with numerous different positions. Moreover, TISA has other Student Bodies such as the TISA Action Network (TAN), Community-Gathering (CG) Team, the Media Team and others.
