= Anglo-American School of Sofia =

Coordinates: 42°36′58″N 23°23′36″E

- 1 Siyanie Str, 1137 Sofia; Bulgaria

Information
- Type: Private International School
- Motto: "We engage, support and prepare each student for today and tomorrow."
- Established: 1967
- Grades: K-12
- Campus size: 7 hectares
- Colors: Blue, Red, Green
- Mascot: Wolf
- Website: www.aas-sofia.org

The Anglo-American School in Sofia (AAS) is a private school founded in 1967 in Sofia, Bulgaria under the sponsorship of the American and British embassies.

In 2005, the school was incorporated by virtue of an agreement between the government of the Republic of Bulgaria and the Government of the United States of America.

== Overview ==
The Anglo-American School of Sofia (AAS) was established in 1967 for children from the United States and the United Kingdom. The charter permits the school to enroll children from other diplomatic missions and generally from the international community in Sofia.

The Anglo-American School of Sofia is a member of the Central & Eastern European Schools Association (CEESA), as well as The Council of British International Schools (COBIS) and The European Council of International Schools (ECIS). The school is accredited by the Council of International Schools (CIS) and the New England Association of Schools and Colleges (NEASC). AAS-Sofia is an authorized International Baccalaureate World School.

The Anglo-American School is governed by a Board of Directors which consists of nine members - four appointed by the American Ambassador, four by the British Ambassador, and the elected President of the Parent Teacher Organization.

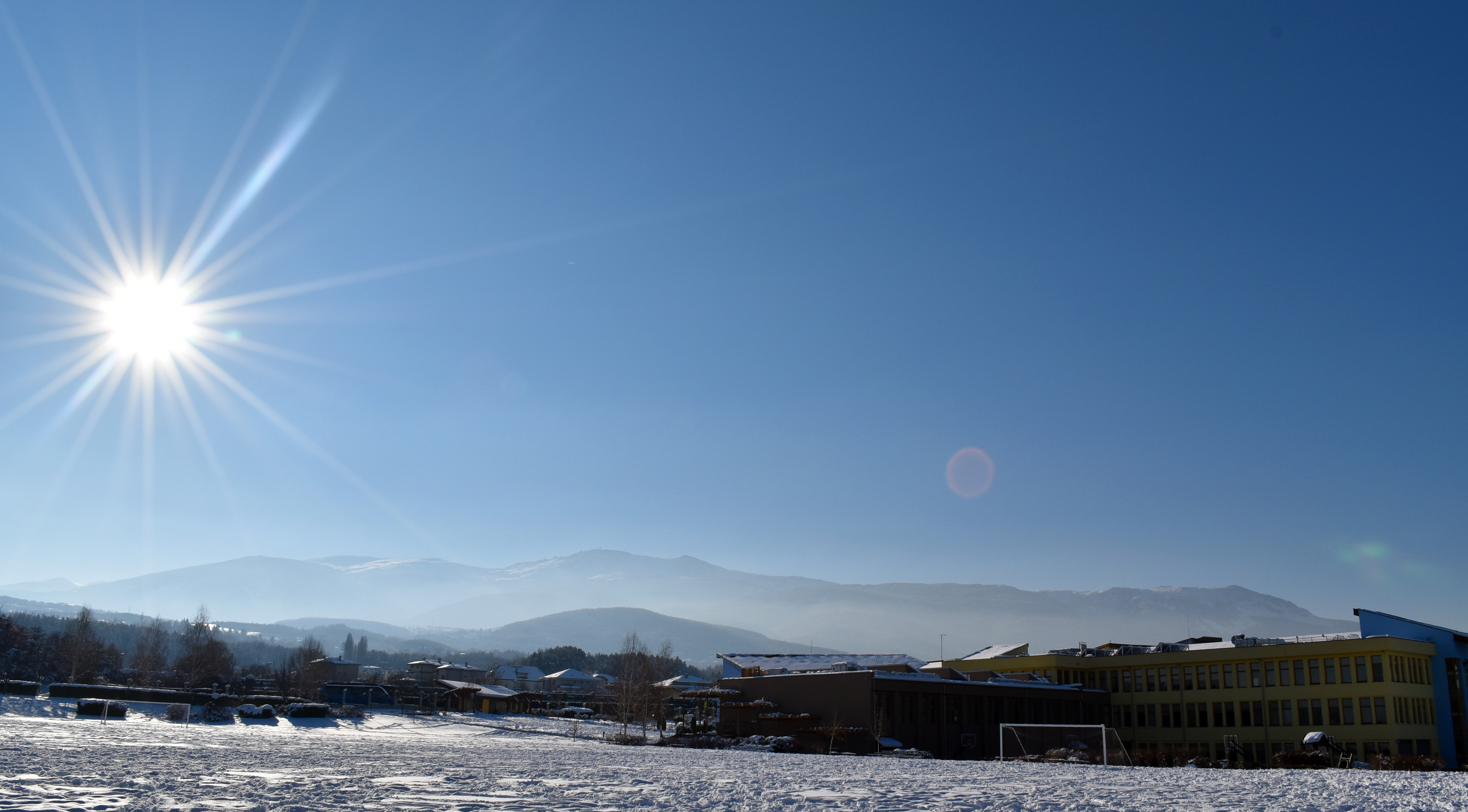
First Snow of the year at AAS

== Enrollment ==
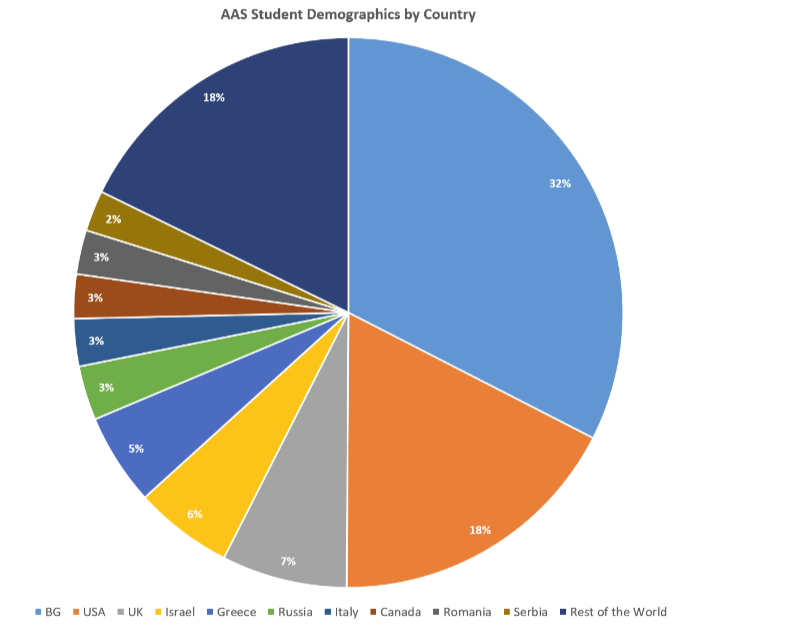
Student Demographics 2016-17

The Anglo-American School of Sofia is the largest international school in Bulgaria, with over 500 students. Students come from over 40 countries and the staff from more than 10. This gives the AAS an international culture and environment. Some students are enrolled into the school for a short period of time because of the nature of their parent's occupation and some stay in the school from K-12.

== Curriculum ==
The Anglo-American School curriculum seeks to combine elements of the American and British programs and emphasizes on individualized instruction.

Based on the students’ age, the school is organized into three major sections - Elementary (Preschool – Grade 5), Middle (Grades 6-8) and High School (Grades 9 – 12). Through Grade 5, the homeroom teachers are responsible for the four core areas of English (Language Arts), mathematics, science, social studies, and follow recently revised curricula. In Grades 6 and 10, there is more specialized departmental teaching. At all levels, the core program is supported by programs in art, French (from Grade 1), Spanish, ICT, Music and Physical Education.

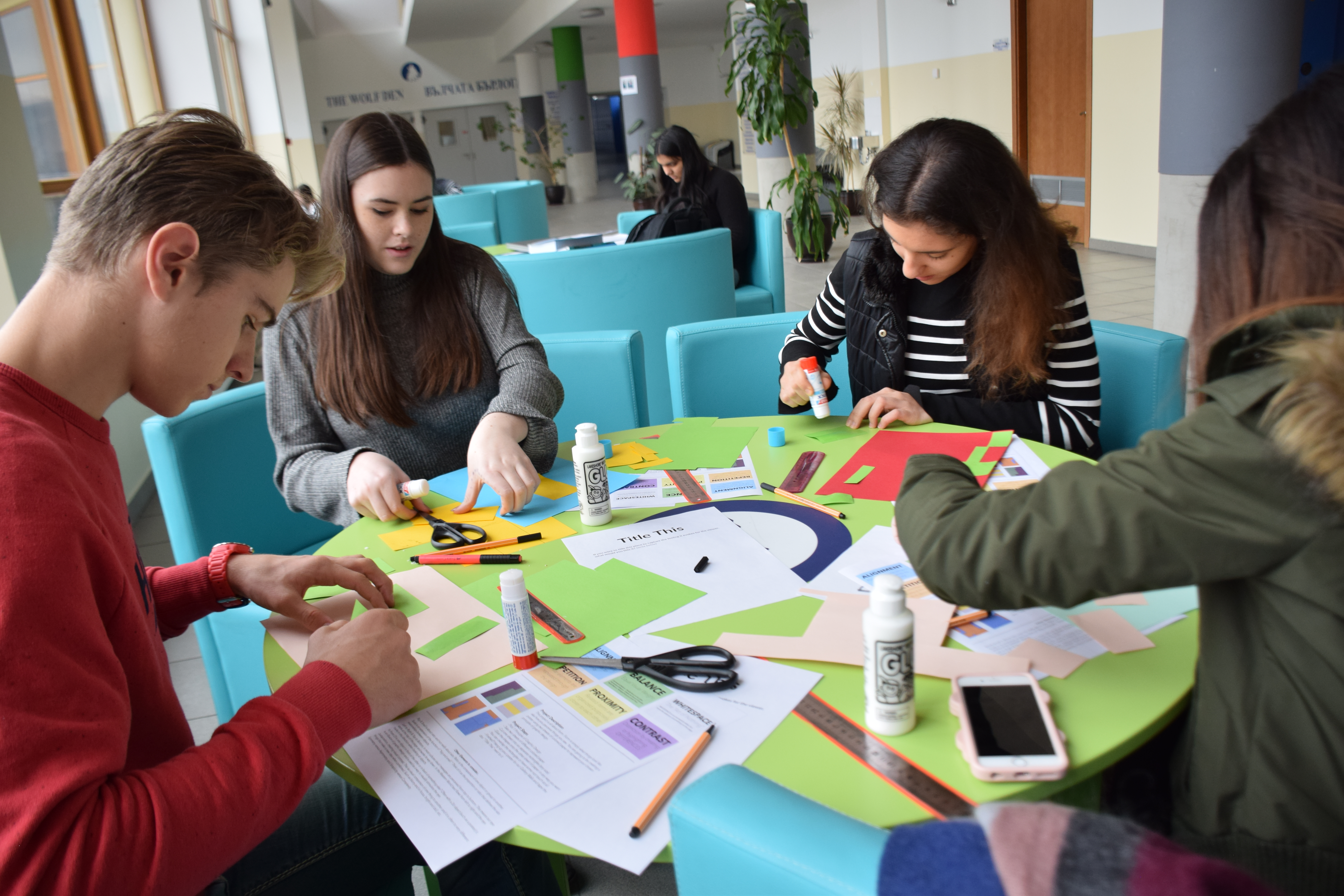
AAS Class

The curriculum has four core elements: Language & Literacy, Mathematics, Science, and Social Studies.
The curriculum is supported by a range of computer hardware, software, and by a library. There is an intensive ESL program from Grades 1-5 and a flexible resource program for students with limited learning disabilities.

=== Elementary school ===
The AAS Elementary School teaches Kindergarten through grade 5.

The curriculum encompasses mathematics, language arts, social studies, science and also regular specialist teaching in subjects such as art, music, ICT and physical education. Although the language of instruction is in English, Bulgarian and French are offered as world language options.

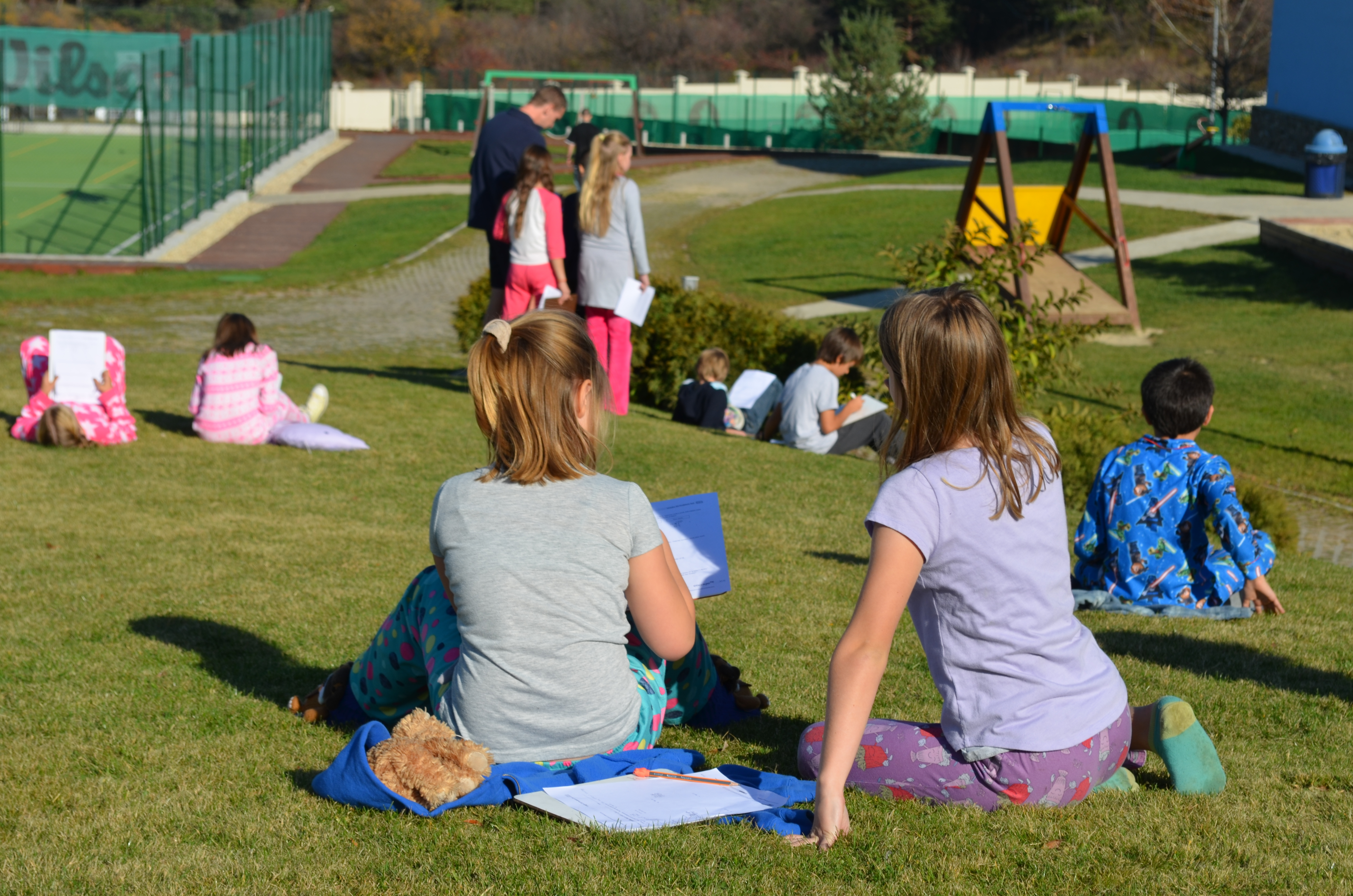
Enjoying the sun

=== Middle school ===
In order to facilitate the transition from elementary to middle school, grade 6 students are self-contained and taught by two core teachers. Students see specialist teachers for all other subjects. In grades 7 and 8, all students are taught by specialist teachers and benefit from a cohesive and diverse curriculum. The academic program is designed to ensure smooth transitions between all three areas of the school, from the elementary to the middle school, and finally to the high school. The curriculum in grades 6, 7 and 8 continues to offer mathematics, science, English, social studies, physical education, French and ESL. The Bulgarian language is also introduced in grade 6 as a foreign language option. Specialist programs in art, ICT, and music are also offered and supported by purpose built, modern facilities.

=== High school ===
High school at AAS comprises grades 9 through 12. The high school provides an academic program, which prepares students for university studies. High school students use science and chemistry laboratories, computer facilities and art rooms. The curriculum of sciences, mathematics, languages, history and art is adaptable to students of all nationalities and levels of ability.

All high school students are required to complete extracurricular projects, which encourage collaboration, team spirit, and commitment. These extracurricular projects provide opportunities for leadership. The CAS (Community, Action and Service) program is a fundamental and compulsory facet of the IB Diploma.

==== IB diploma ====
Students take six maybe 7… 2-year-long courses chosen from the IBDP groups: 3 subjects at the higher level (HL) and 3 at the standard level (SL). The IB Diploma is recognized by the world's leading universities.

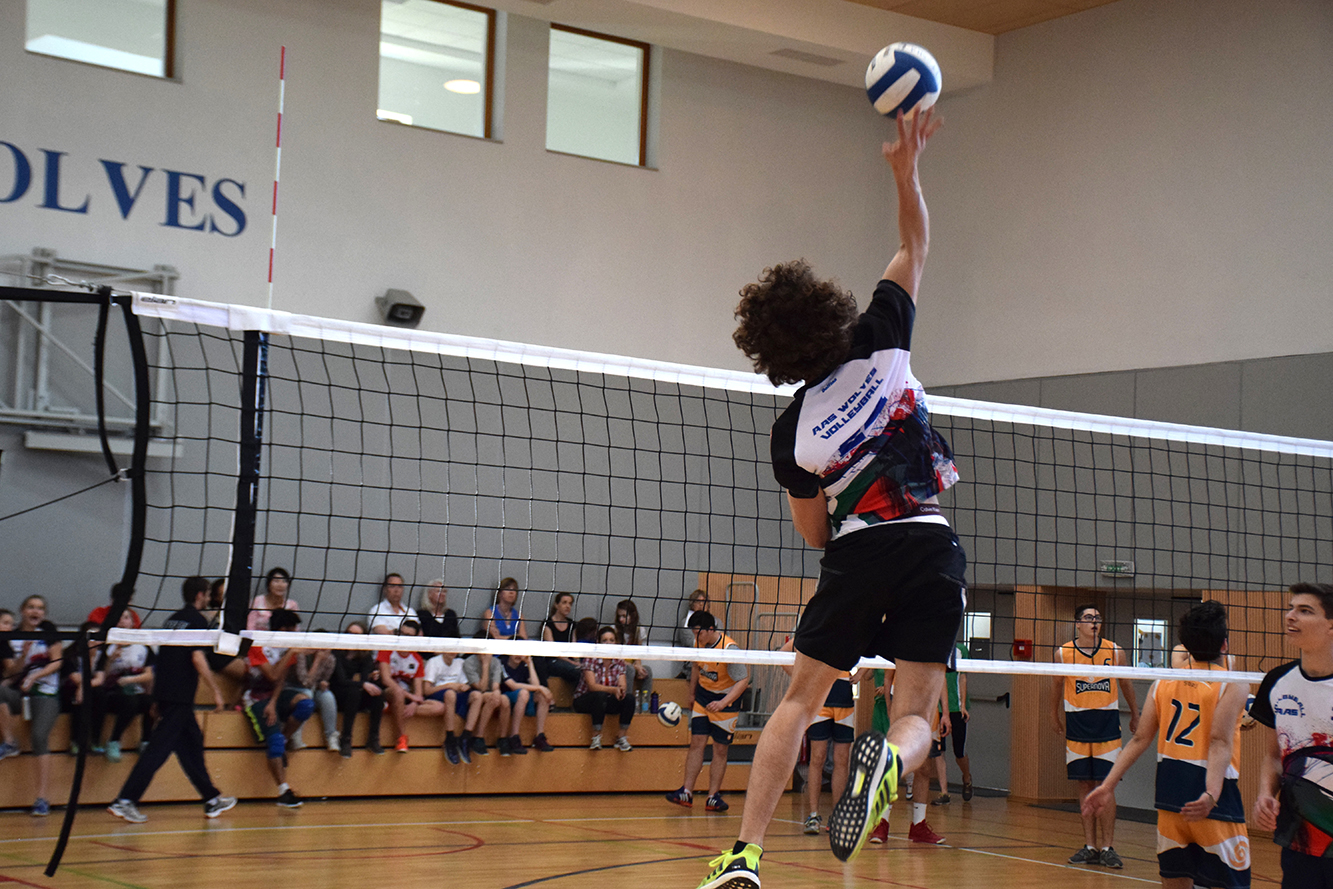
HS Volleyball Game

=== Co-curricular activities ===
Additional activities are offered during the school day and after school throughout the year, giving students the opportunity to develop special interests, learn new skills, and socialize. These activities are described as co-curricular, as they are intended to complement and supplement the regular academic program. The Co-Curricular program at AAS is extensive with between 30 and 40 different offerings per session.
These programs offer an opportunity for students to learn lifelong skills and an opportunity to work collaboratively with a wide age range of students. In addition, students and teachers have the opportunity to work together outside the normal academic program.

== Sports and activities ==
The school offers a competitive interscholastic athletics and activities program intended to enrich and enhance the educational experience of students. The school is part of CEESA and the athletics and activities, respectively, that are offered include:

- Fall Season: Football, Cross Country, Speech and Debate, and Model United Nations.
- Winter Season: Basketball, Swimming, Knowledge Bowl, and Math Counts
- Spring Season: Volleyball, Tennis, Softball, and Band and Choir

There are also other competitive activities which include: Robotics, Cultural Arts, Hands-On Students Involvement Conference (HOSIC), etc.

== Admissions ==
=== Scholarship ===
The Anglo-American School of Sofia (AAS) awards several full academic scholarships to talented Bulgarian students, who would like to continue their education at the school. The scholarship covers tuition fees at AAS for the scholar's entire course of studies (4 or 5 years). AAS has 15 places for scholarship students from grade 8-12. On the eligibility for scholarship can be found here.
