= Central and Eastern European Schools Association =

CEESA (Central and Eastern European Schools Association) is an association of international schools in Central and Eastern Europe. The member schools are all sponsored by the United States Department of State Office of Overseas Schools.

== Full Member Schools ==
- Quality Schools International (A group of schools in Europe and Asia, with headquarters in Naxxar, Malta.)
- International School of Belgrade
- International School of Prague
- Anglo-American School of Moscow (Closed in 2022.)
- Anglo-American School of St. Petersburg
- American International School of Bucharest
- American International School of Budapest
- Anglo-American School of Sofia
- International School of Estonia
- Tashkent International School
- International School of Helsinki
- American International School of Vienna
- Istanbul International Community School
- American International School of Vilnius
- International School of Krakow
- American School of Warsaw
- International School of Latvia
- American International School of Zagreb
- Pechersk School International
- Kyiv International School
- The International School of Azerbaijan
- Nova International Schools

== Competitions ==
CEESA regularly organizes annual competitions between member schools. These competitions in sports are: middle school robotics, high school robotics, middle school soccer (football), high school soccer (football), volleyball, tennis, softball, swimming, cross-country, and basketball. In educational competitions there is speech and debate, middle school mathcounts, high school mathcounts, middle school knowledge bowl, and high school knowledge Bowl.

== Conferences ==
CEESA sponsors an annual conference for teachers and staff at US-sponsored schools in Central and Eastern Europe. The 2007 conference is planned for Prague; the 2008 conference for Istanbul.

The 2019 CEESA Conference was in Warsaw. The 2020 CEESA Conference was held virtually and hosted in Helsinki. The 2021 CEESA Conference was in Budapest. The 2022 CEESA Conference was in Bucharest. The 2023 CEESA Conference was in Lithuania. The 2024 CEESA Conference was in Malta. The 2025 CEESA Conference was in Split.

== Divisions ==
There are three divisions in CEESA. The first and biggest division is the Red Division. The schools in this division are Budapest, Bucharest, Istanbul, Kyiv, Moscow, Prague, and Warsaw. These schools have 700 students and above. The second division is the Blue Division. The schools in this division are Belgrade, Helsinki, Latvia, Nova Skopje, Psi, Sofia, and Azerbaijan. These schools have from 400-600 students. The third and smallest school is the Green division. The schools in this division are Estonia, Krakow, Tirana, Vilnius, Zagreb, and Cyprus. These schools have less than 400 students.
