= Collège des Frères de Jaffa =

Coordinates: 32°3′7.4″N 34°45′12.2″E

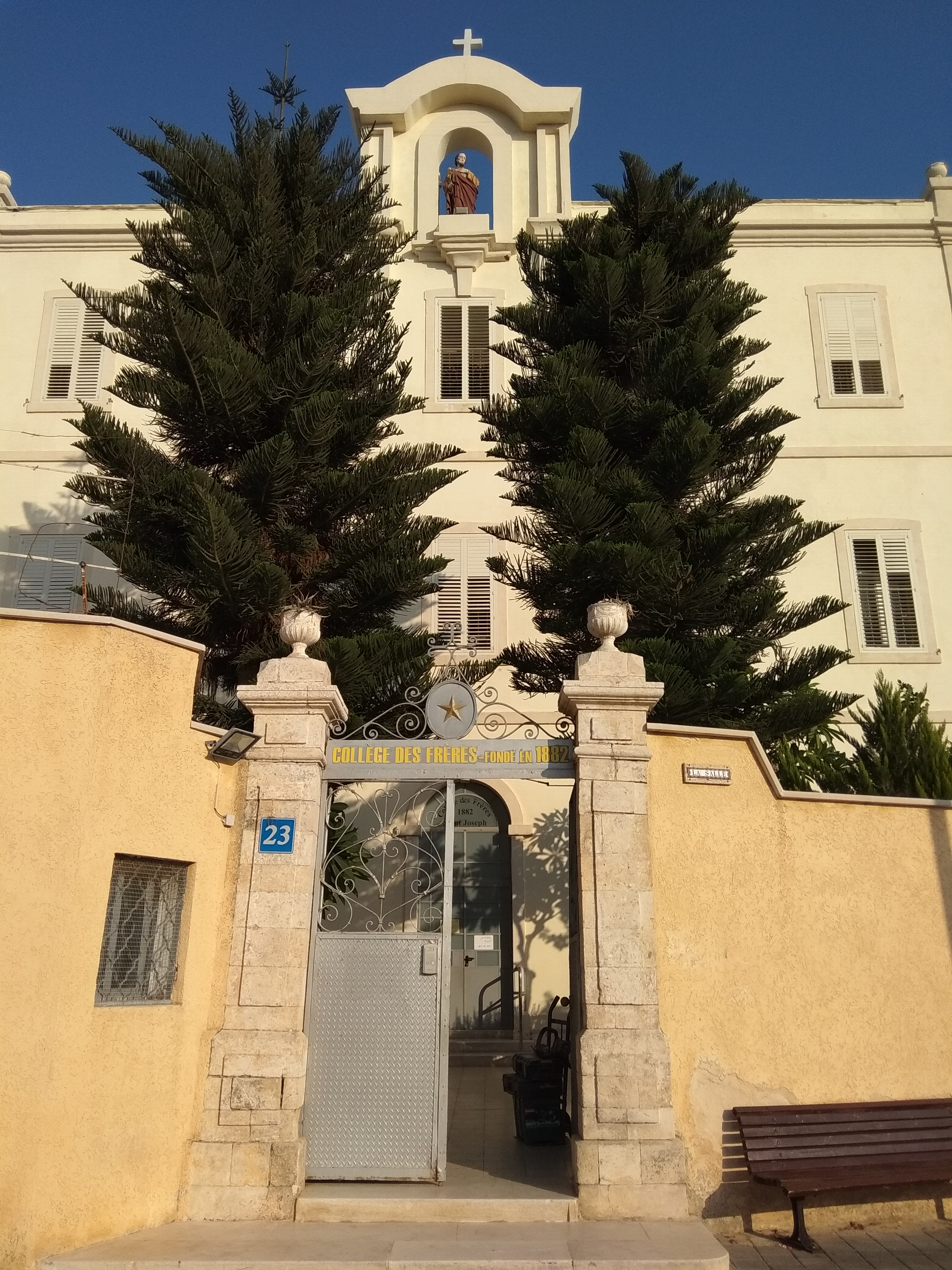
College des Freres Jaffa

Collège des Frères de Jaffa (Hebrew: קולג' דה פרר; Arabic: مدرسة الفرير في يافا) is a French international school on Yefet Street #23 in Jaffa, a district of Tel Aviv. A part of the La Sallian educational institutions, it opened in 1882. Originally it was in the Mutasarrifate of Jerusalem, Ottoman Empire, before being in the British Mandate of Palestine; currently it is in Israel.

Hosting one of six French international high school programs in Israel, it serves levels maternelle (preschool) through terminale (final year of high school), with quatrième through terminale under the AEFE. This affiliation ensures that students receive a high-standard French education, preparing them for the French baccalauréat and offering them opportunities to continue their studies in France or other French-speaking countries.

== Notable alumni ==
- Ismail al-Faruqi, philosopher and Islamic scholar
- Élie Barnavi, historian and diplomat
- Ghassan Kanafani, writer and political activist
- Ayman Sikseck, author, literary critic, and cultural commentator
- Scandar Copti, filmmaker addressing social issues
- Abu Nidal, militant leader and founder of the Abu Nidal Organization (ANO)

== See also ==
- Education in the Ottoman Empire
  - List of schools in the Ottoman Empire
