= Meridian International School, Kyiv =

Coordinates: 50°30′07″N 30°25′44″E

Meridian International Lyceum, Kyiv
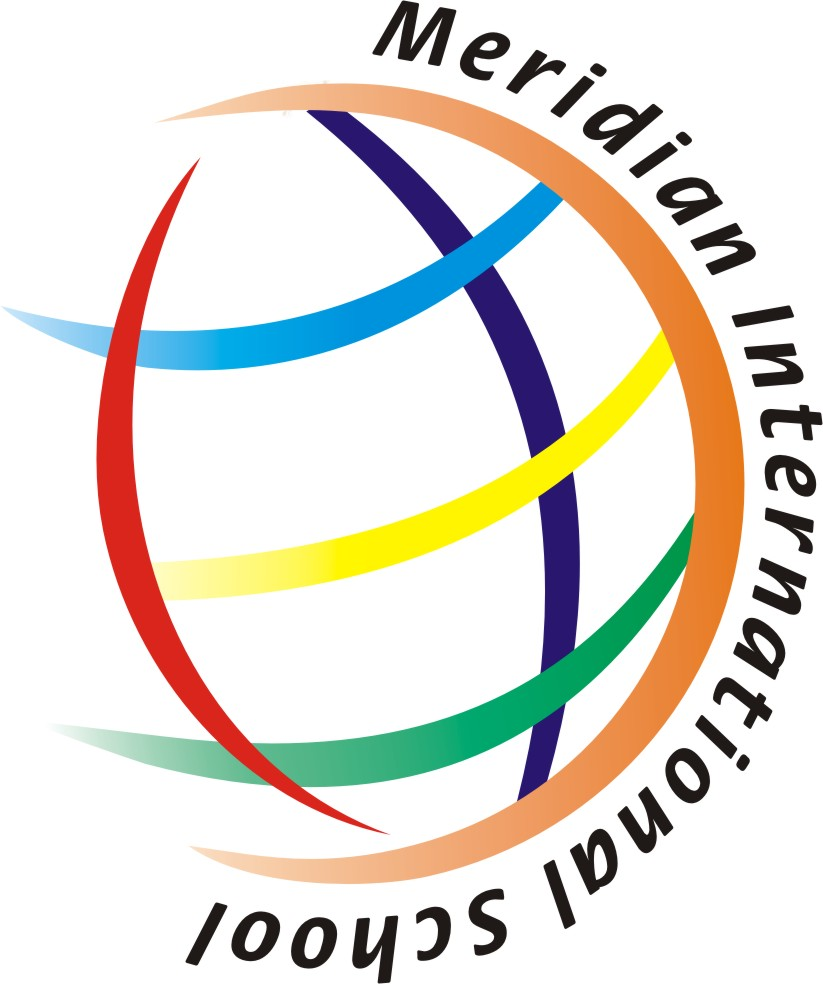

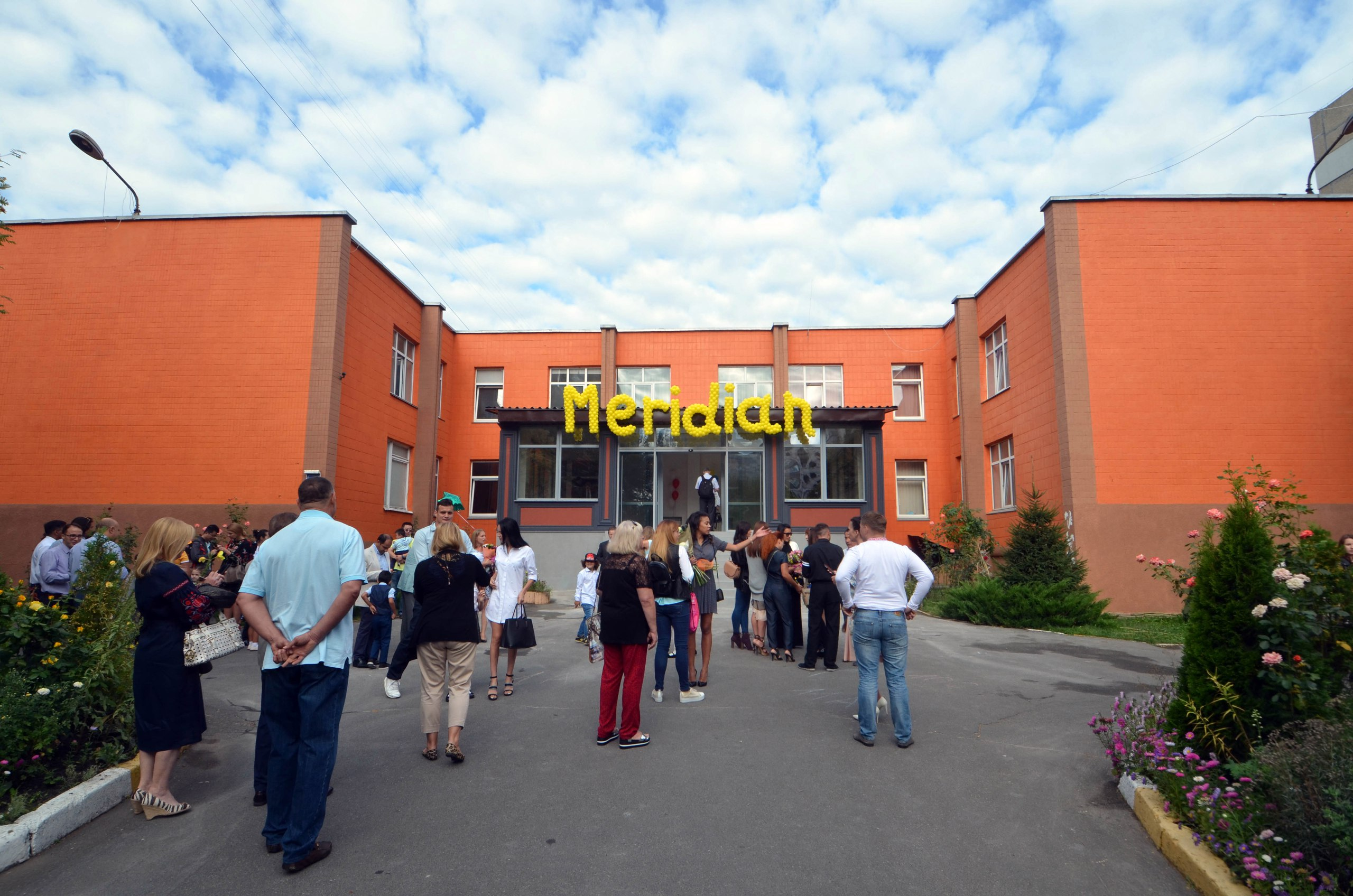

Location
- Kyiv, Kvitnevy Provulok 5A, 04108, Podilskiy region

Information
- Type: International School
- Established: 2001
- School district: Podilskiy
- Principal: Tarykhchiev A.
- Grades: Kindergarten-Year Eleven
- Enrollment: more than 150
- Language: English, Ukrainian
- Website: www.mischool.com.ua

Meridian International Lyceum, established in 2001, is an international day school in Kyiv, Ukraine, catering for children from pre-school to the 11th grade.

MIS is a member of Quality Schools International and the European Council of International Schools.

== Description ==
The educational equipment and facilities include computing room, science laboratories, art workshops. The school provides bus services for students from different districts of Kyiv.

=== Curriculum ===
The curriculum includes languages, mathematics, science, technology, humanities, social studies, physical education, computer skills, music and the creative arts. Sports and extracurricular activities such as clubs and trips are also offered.

=== Students ===
Meridian International School opened with 1 student from kindergarten to grade 11 and now enrolls about 0 students.

As of 2018, the student body consists of more than 36 nationalities. Classes are generally limited to 20 or fewer students.

=== Organizations ===
World Scholars Cup since 2018

DreamECO Ecology Project Competition since 2014

LearnENG English Skill Test (association with McMillan English)

Mathology Math and Logic Contest

Golden Feathers

== See also ==
- International schools in Ukraine
- Schools in Kyiv
