= Children of Heroes Charity Fund =

- Благодійний фонд «Діти Героїв»
- Formation: March 3, 2022; 4 years ago
- Founder: Dan Pasko Antonina Golovach; Valeria Abdal; Serge Goncharevich; Sergiy Semenichenko Iaroslav Prygara
- Legal status: Nonprofit organization
- Professional title: Charitable organization
- Origins: Assistance to children who have lost one or both parents as a result of the Russo-Ukrainian War
- Region served: Ukraine
- CEO: Anna Yermolaieva
- Staff: 84 (2024)
- Website: childrenheroes.org/en/

The Children of Heroes Charity Fund (Ukrainian: Благодійний фонд «Діти Героїв») is a Ukrainian charitable organization established in March 2022 following the Russian invasion of Ukraine. It supports children who have lost one or both parents as a result of the Russo-Ukrainian War through psychological, educational, medical, legal and humanitarian assistance.

The organization uses a case-management model in which family assistants assess families' needs, maintain contact with children and their guardians, and coordinate access to support services. In July 2026, Yle reported that the foundation said it was supporting about 16,000 children.

== History ==
The foundation was established on 3 March 2022 and began its official operations the following month. The initiative was launched by businessman Dan Pasko and several co-founders in response to the growing number of Ukrainian children who had lost parents following the full-scale Russian invasion.

During its first months, the foundation concentrated on financial and humanitarian assistance, temporary accommodation and psychological support. By May 2022 it was supporting more than one hundred children. The foundation also introduced a system in which an assistant maintained regular contact with each family and helped coordinate continuing assistance.

By August 2023, the foundation had provided a total of US$4.2 million in aid. That month, The Irish Times reported from the 7 Fields summer camp near Kyiv, one of a network of camps through which Children of Heroes provided holidays for about 6,000 children who had lost one or both parents or had been internally displaced.

In March 2024, The Kyiv Independent reported that almost 8,000 children were enrolled in the foundation's programmes. According to the newspaper, 88 per cent of them had lost a parent serving in the Ukrainian military. The foundation provided participating families with personal assistants and organized educational courses, workshops and camps. It also arranged psychological support and a summer camp in Spain for children who had experienced parental loss. By July 2024, the foundation was reported to be supporting about 8,000 children.

In April 2025, The Telegraph reported that Children of Heroes had 28 psychologists specializing in areas including grief support and assistance for teenagers.

By September 2025, then-chief executive Tetiana Novytska said that the foundation was supporting more than 14,000 children and had distributed over US$17 million in assistance since its establishment.

In March 2026, RSI reported that approximately 15,000 children were receiving support from the foundation. In July, Yle reported that the foundation said it was supporting about 16,000 children.

In August 2026, Foreign Policy reported that the foundation was registering around 15 children a day, according to its head of communications.

== Programmes and operations ==
The foundation provides both emergency and continuing assistance based on the needs and circumstances of individual children and families. Emergency support has included financial aid, food, clothing, hygiene supplies and temporary accommodation. Its longer-term programmes cover psychological counselling, medical assistance, education and development, and legal support. The foundation has stated that its long-term aim is to support participating children until they reach adulthood.

The organization uses a case-management model based on family assistants, who maintain contact with children and their guardians, assess changing needs and coordinate access to the foundation's programmes or external services. The foundation also provides humanitarian assistance to participating families living near the front line.

Psychological support forms part of the foundation's continuing programmes. In April 2025, The Telegraph reported that the foundation had 28 psychologists working in areas including grief support and assistance for teenagers. Psychological care has also been incorporated into camps and other activities organized for participating children. Educational programmes have included tutoring, foreign-language learning, exam preparation, IT and digital-skills training, workshops and summer camps. The foundation has also worked with the 7Fields school near Kyiv, where children who had lost parents received schooling, psychological support and other activities. In 2025, it partnered with the IT Ukraine Association on an online programme for teenagers covering digital skills, teamwork and career orientation. The Kyiv Independent reported on a camp in Spain arranged alongside psychological support, while RSI described school courses, English-language instruction and educational travel abroad, including a trip to Sweden. In 2025, The Times reported that the foundation had helped arrange boarding-school education for a child who had lost both parents during the war.

Children supported by the foundation have also taken part in cultural and sporting activities. In May 2025, The Guardian reported that a group travelled with Children of Heroes to the 2025 Ukrainian Cup final in Zhytomyr, profiling a teenager whose father had been killed while delivering humanitarian aid.

== Organisation ==
The foundation is financed through donations from individuals, companies and international organizations. It operates through entities in Ukraine, the United States and the Netherlands.

Tetiana Novytska was serving as chief executive in September 2025. By May 2026, Ukrainian news agency UNIAN identified Anna Yermolaieva as executive director of the foundation.

In December 2024, the Foundation Children of Heroes of Ukraine was admitted as an associate member of Eurochild, a European network of organizations and individuals working on children's rights.

== Recognition ==
In February 2024, the foundation was one of three organizations recognized for the number of humanitarian shipments made in support of children through Nova Poshta's annual Varti awards. The recipients in this group were selected on the basis of the number and weight of shipments handled through the company's humanitarian programme.
