= Handasaim Herzliya High School =

High school in Israel

Coordinates: 32.1640°N 34.8266°E

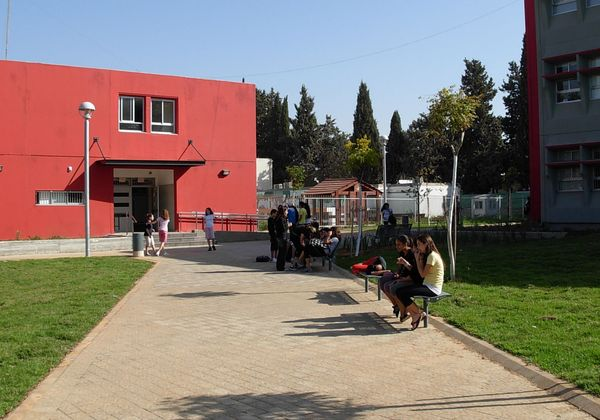
- Herzliya, Israel

Information
- Type: High school
- Established: 1962
- Principal: Orit Rosen
- Newspaper: HandesEye https://handeseye.wixsite.com/handes-eye
- Website: https://handasaim.co.il/

The Handasaim Herzliya High School (Hebrew: תיכון הנדסאים הרצליה), formerly known as the Tel-Aviv University Secondary School is a high school located in Herzliya. The current principal of the school is Orit Rosen.

The school was established in the 1962, thanks to a donation given by the Meyerhoff family from Brazil, as a high school belonging to the Tel Aviv University.

Handasaim offers only science electives such as computer science and biotechnology and attracts students from all over the country due to its excellence.

In 2005, due to Tel Aviv University's financial difficulties the school was sold to the Herzliya municipality and in 2008 the school moved to a new campus in Herzliya located near the 'Seven Stars' Mall and very close to two other schools: high school Hadash, and middle school Yad Giyora.

The school is located next to a science center which was built especially for Handasaim, used by all high schools in Herzliya. The science center includes advanced labs for physics, chemistry, robotics etc., and is the biggest science center used by high school students in Israel.

The school supports programs such as FIRST Robotics Competition, FIRST Lego League Challenge, and Nachshon. The school offers three courses: Computer Science, Engineering and Biotechnology.

Handasaim high school is the school with the most FIRST teams in Israel, and as of 2020, includes 12 FIRST Lego League Challenge teams and an FIRST Tech Challenge team, all mentored by the members of the school's FIRST Robotics Competition team General Angels. A new robotics building on campus is currently under construction and will be used by the school's flagship team, General Angels.

Handasaim is known to be the school from which the greatest number of soldier-students (atuda'im) graduates from all of the Israeli schools.

== Acomplishments ==
Handesaim high school is ranked as one of the top high schools in Israel. According to a study by Mako on ranking high schools based on Bagrut scores and accomplishments in 2026, Handesiam is ranked first in the fields of Computer Science, English (5 points) and Physics (5 points). As well as ranking second in Hebrew (2 points) and third in Bible Studies (Tanak, 2 points).
