= Kyiv International School =

Coordinates: 50.4494°N 30.3845°E

- Kyiv; Ukraine

Information
- Type: Private, International
- Motto: Success For All
- Established: 1992
- School Director: Mr. Luke Woodruff
- Faculty: 110 (before February 24, 2022)
- Grades: PreK - Grade 12
- Enrollment: 770+ total (before February 24, 2022)
- Average class size: 16 students
- Colours: Red & black
- Mascot: Kozak
- Accreditation: Middle States Association of Colleges and Schools, AP Capstone, International Baccalaureate
- Website: kyiv.qsi.org

Kyiv International School (Ukrainian: Київська міжнародна школа; KIS) is a private international school located in Kyiv, Ukraine. Founded in 1992. The school is a member of Quality Schools International (QSI), a consortium of nonprofit college-preparatory schools following an American-style, international curriculum. It is a current member of CEESA (Central and Eastern European Schools Association). The school operates with the approval of the Ukrainian government and offers a PreK - Grade 12 education in the English language, including a DP International Baccalaureate program as well as Advanced Placement courses. The school year is from August to June.

== Curriculum ==
The academic program uses a performance-based Mastery Learning approach to learning. It is accredited by the Middle States Association of Colleges and Schools. It also has scholarship contracts, and follows an A, B, P, D, H grading.

The school offers the teaching of four languages (French, German, Spanish, and Ukrainian). These courses are offered at a variety of levels from 7 – 17 years of age within the context of the school's language curriculum, and IB and AP programs for non-native and native speakers.

== Russian invasion of Ukraine ==
Due to the war in Ukraine, Kyiv International School shifted to online learning from February 2022 to February 2023. On February 8, 2023, the school reopened campus, while operating on flexible modes. Starting August 2023 the school fully moved back to onsite learning.

== Alumni ==
Graduate students receive acceptances to the world's top universities and colleges around the world, including Harvard University, Yale University, NYU, Stanford University and many others.
