= American School of Warsaw =

School in Warsaw, Poland

- Type: Private
- Established: 1953
- Accreditation: NEASC/CIS
- Director: Dr. Michelle Kleiss
- Location: Konstancin-Jeziorna, Poland; 52°06′48″N 21°06′56″E
- Colors: Red and Black
- Mascot: Warrior

The American School of Warsaw (commonly abbreviated as ASW) is an English-language international school in Warsaw, Poland, founded in 1953 by members of the US Embassy. The school remains connected to the Embassy for general support and the US Ambassador is the honorary chair of the board according to the bylaws of the school. Members of the Board of Trustees are appointed by the ambassador, appointed by the board itself, or elected by the members of the school association (parents).

The school is divided into Elementary and Upper School divisions. Students can currently prepare under the International Baccalaureate Diploma Programme in Grades 11–12, and even those that choose not to take the full diploma receive instruction under the IB framework. The school offers a High School Diploma that is equivalent to a US High School, the IB Diploma, and a modified diploma for students with special needs. Since November 2018, the school has offered the full IB Continuum, including the addition of both the Middle Years Program (MYP) and the Primary Years Program (PYP).

ASW is a member of Central and Eastern European Schools Association (CEESA), Sports Council for International Schools (SCIS), and New England Association of Schools and Colleges (NEASC). It will be jointly accredited by NEASC and IB (International Baccalaureate) in 2024 under the updated NEASC/IB Collaborative Learning Protocol (CLP). The school received accreditation from NEASC/CIS under joint protocol in 2018.

The school moved to its current facility in 2001 and welcomed the addition of a new Physical Education and Art Annex finished in the Spring of 2012. It is currently involved in Master Planning aligned with strategic goals that will refresh the campus for the next two decades. The school also has a 25m pool and a library that includes a picture book room. The grounds also contain tennis courts, basketball courts, football courts, baseball, courts as well as two extensive playgrounds.

The school has some 1000+ students from Pre-K to 12th Grade, with, on average, twenty students per class. The student body contains 55+ different nationalities. The student population is approximately 20% American, 20% Polish and the rest from around the world.
