= New Arab High School =

Arab state high school in Israel

New Arab High School (Hebrew: תיכון ערבי חדש) is an Arab state high school in Lod, Israel. The city's first Arab state high school, it opened in the former Lod Regional College seat building in November 2010. As of June 2011 it had 250 students. It was scheduled to move into a new facility in the Train neighbourhood of Lod, but as of June 2011 it remained in its temporary home.
