= Council of International Schools =

Nonprofit association

- Abbreviation: CIS
- Formation: 1949
- Type: Membership organization
- Legal status: International
- Purpose: Education
- Headquarters: Schipholweg 113, 2316 XC
- Location: Leiden, The Netherlands
- Coordinates: 52.16974°N 4.48966°E
- Region served: Worldwide (122 countries)
- Services: Educational accreditation
- Fields: Schools; colleges; universities
- Members: 740 schools 610 colleges/universities
- Executive Director: Jane Larsson
- Website: cois.org

The Council of International Schools (CIS) is a membership organization aimed at international education.

CIS was formed in 2003. It has over 1,500 institutional members consisting of over 800 schools and 600 colleges/universities, located in 121 countries. Many international schools in countries around the world are paying members. The services of CIS include international educational accreditation.

The CIS headquarters are in Leiden, The Netherlands. CIS's legal name is Council of International Schools, Inc. and it is a "not-for-profit" company registered in the state of Delaware in the United States.

To be CIS Accredited, a school pays the membership fee and then an accreditation "registration fee" of €2,140. Once CIS Accredited, the school then pays €4,350 annually. Evaluation of the school takes place every five years. Accredited schools complete a peer-evaluation process.

The annual membership fee is based on the number of students the school has enrolled.
