= List of high schools in Ecuador =

This is a list of high schools in Ecuador.

== Guayaquil ==
- Colegio Javier
- German School of Guayaquil
- Inter-American Academy of Guayaquil

== Quito ==
- Academia Cotopaxi
- Alliance Academy International
- The British School of Quito
- Colegio Americano de Quito
- Colegio Intisana
- Deutsche Schule Quito
- Instituto Nacional Mejía
- Lycée La Condamine
- St, Gabriel College

== Other ==
- Christ the King School, Portoviejo
- Colegio Alemán Stiehle, Cuenca
- Colegio Bernardo Valdivieso, Loja
