= Lists of schools by country =

This is a list of lists of schools, sorted by country. The list does not include educational institutions providing higher education, meaning tertiary, quaternary, or post-secondary education, for which see list of colleges and universities by country.

== Africa ==
- List of schools in Angola
- List of schools in Botswana
- List of schools in Egypt
- List of schools in Eswatini
- List of schools in Ethiopia
- List of schools in the Gambia
- List of schools in Ghana
  - List of senior high schools in Ghana
- List of schools in Guinea
- List of schools in Kenya
- List of schools in Lesotho
- List of schools in Liberia
- Lists of schools in Mauritius
- List of schools in Namibia
- List of schools in Nigeria
- List of schools in Rwanda
- List of schools in South Africa
- List of schools in Sudan
- List of schools in Tanzania
- List of schools in Tunisia
- List of schools in Uganda
- List of schools in Zambia
- List of schools in Zimbabwe

== South America ==
- List of schools in Argentina
- List of schools in Brazil
- List of schools in Colombia
- List of high schools in Ecuador
- List of schools in Guyana
- List of schools in Paraguay

== North America ==
=== North America ===
- List of schools in Anguilla
- List of schools in Bermuda
- Lists of schools in Canada
- Lists of schools in the United States
- List of schools in the Cayman Islands
- List of schools in Mexico

=== Caribbean ===
- List of schools in Antigua and Barbuda
- List of schools in Barbados
- List of schools in the Dominican Republic
- List of schools in Saint Kitts and Nevis
- List of schools in Saint Lucia
- List of schools in Trinidad and Tobago

=== Central America ===
- List of schools in Honduras
- List of schools in Nicaragua

== Asia ==
- List of schools in Afghanistan
- List of educational institutions in Bahrain
- List of schools in Bangladesh
- List of international schools in China
- Lists of schools in Hong Kong
- List of schools in India
- List of schools in Indonesia
- List of schools in Iran
- List of schools in Iraq
- List of schools in Israel
- Lists of schools in Japan
- List of schools in Jordan
- List of schools in Kuwait
- List of schools in Lebanon
- List of schools in Nepal
- List of schools in Macau
- Lists of schools in Malaysia
- List of schools in the Maldives
- List of schools in Oman
- List of schools in Pakistan
- List of international schools in the Philippines
- List of schools in Qatar
- List of schools in Saudi Arabia
- List of schools in Singapore
- Lists of schools in Sri Lanka
- List of schools in Syria
- List of schools in Taiwan
- List of secondary schools in Timor-Leste
- List of schools in Thailand
- List of high schools in Turkey
- List of schools in the United Arab Emirates

== Europe ==
- List of schools in Albania
- List of schools in Austria
- Lists of schools in Belgium
- List of schools in Bulgaria
- List of schools in Croatia
- List of schools in Cyprus
- List of schools in the Czech Republic
- List of schools in Denmark
- List of schools in Estonia
- List of schools in Finland
- List of schools in France
- List of schools in Germany
- List of schools in Greece
- List of schools in Hungary
- List of schools in Iceland
- List of schools in the Republic of Ireland
- List of schools in Italy
- List of schools in Latvia
- List of schools in Lithuania
- List of secondary schools in Luxembourg
- List of schools in the Netherlands
- List of schools in Northern Cyprus
- List of schools in Norway
- List of schools in Poland
- List of schools in Portugal
- List of secondary schools in Romania
- List of schools in Ukraine
- Lists of schools in the United Kingdom
  - Lists of schools in England
  - Lists of schools in Northern Ireland
  - Lists of schools in Scotland
  - Lists of schools in Wales

== Oceania ==
- Lists of schools in Australia
- Lists of schools in New Zealand

== See also ==
- Lists of schools
