= CAQ =

CAQ may refer to:

- Coalition Avenir Québec (Coalition for Quebec's Future), a Canadian political party
- Computer-aided quality assurance, using computers to assure quality in manufacturing
- Deutsche Schule Quito (Colegio Alemán de Quito, Quito German School), Ecuador
- CovertAction Quarterly, an American political journal published from 1978 to 2005
