= EFIK =

EFIK may refer to:

- International French School of Kampala (École Française Internationale de Kampala)
- École Française Internationale de Khartoum
