= Christ the King School, Portoviejo =

Christ the King School
- Spanish: Unidad Educativa Cristo Rey

Location
- Portoviejo; Ecuador
- Coordinates: 1°3′15″S 80°26′48″W

Information
- Former name: Christ the King Seminary
- Type: Private primary and secondary school
- Religious affiliation: Catholicism
- Denomination: Jesuit
- Established: 1930; 96 years ago (as a seminary)
- Rector: Mgtr. Edward Gutiérrez
- Staff: 152
- Grades: K-12
- Gender: Coeducational
- Enrollment: 1,486
- Affiliation: International Baccalaureate Organisation
- Website: www.cristorey.edu.ec

Christ the King School (Spanish: Unidad Educativa Cristo Rey) is a private Catholic primary and secondary school, located in Portoviejo, Ecuador. Established in 1930 as a seminary run by the Society of Jesus, the school grew to be pre-primary through high school, and serves the needier segment of society.

== History ==
The school originated in 1930 as Christ the King Seminary. In 1938 the seminary became Christ the King School at the elementary level. In 1955 Colegio Particular Cristo Rey was created with the baccalaureate in Modern Humanities. By 2005 Christ the King Educational Unit was accredited for students ages 5 through 18, awarding the Bachelor of Science. In 2015 it was authorized to offer also the International Baccalaureate Diploma Programme.

The school uses of the EFQM management system.

== See also ==
- Education in Ecuador
- List of Jesuit schools
