= St. Gabriel College, Quito =

St. Gabriel College
- Spanish: Colegio San Gabriel

Location
- Av. America and Mariana de Jesus; Quito; Ecuador
- Coordinates: 0°11′4.39″S 78°29′44.54″W

Information
- Type: Private primary and secondary school
- Religious affiliation: Catholic
- Denomination: Jesuit
- Established: 1862; 164 years ago
- Rector: Hno. Guillermo Oñate
- Director: Martha Peñaherrera
- Staff: 176
- Grades: K-12
- Gender: Coeducational
- Enrollment: 1,491
- Website: www.csgabriel.edu.ec

St. Gabriel College (Spanish: Colegio San Gabriel) is a private Catholic primary and secondary school in Quito, Ecuador. The school was founded by the Society of Jesus in 1862 and has grown to include pre-primary as well as six primary and six secondary years.

== History ==
In 1862, President Gabriel García Moreno brought members of a German Jesuits Order to manage the National Polytechnic School and the Quito Astronomical Observatory. That consisted of naturalist Theodor Wolf, astronomer Juan Bautista Menten, architect José Kolberg, José Epping, chemist Luis Dressel and botanist Luis Sodiro. They also opened and managed a school that in colonial times was called San Luis in the heart of old Quito. They renamed the school San Gabriel. It was still subsidized by the state until 1901, when the liberal government forced its privatization. In 1958, it moved to its new facilities on America Avenue north of the city. In 2011, San Gabriel opened a coeducational primary unit, beginning with the first grade.

== Notable staff ==
- Fabián Alarcón
- Francisco Tobar García
- José María Velasco Ibarra
- Jorge Salvador Lara
- Jamil Mahuad
- Jaime Nebot
- Fausto Oswaldo Sarmiento - environmentalist
- Clemente Yerovi

== See also ==
- Catholic Church in Ecuador
- Education in Ecuador
- List of Jesuit schools
