= Gada Kadoda =

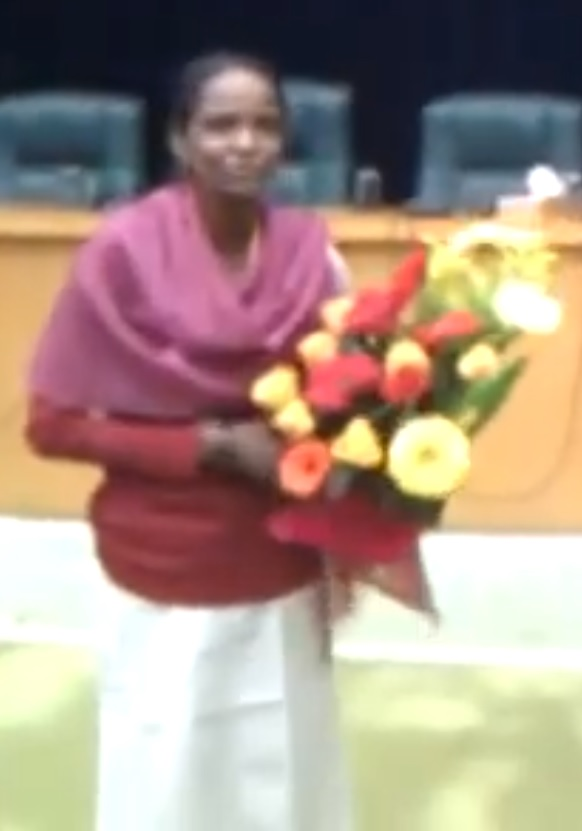
- Gada Kadoda with flowers after "Knowledge Management Capacity in Africa" conference 2012
- Education: University of Khartoum (BSc); City, University of London (MSc); Loughborough University (PhD)
- Awards: BBC 100 Women
- Scientific career
- Fields: Software engineering
- Workplaces: University of Bournemouth; Imperial College London
- Thesis: Formal software development tools : an investigation into usability (1997)

Gada Kadoda (Arabic: غادة كدودة) is a Sudanese Engineer and associate professor at Garden City College for Science and Technology. She teaches at the University of Khartoum, where she introduced a course in knowledge management. She has previously served as President of the Sudanese Knowledge Society. She was selected as one of the BBC 100 Women in 2019.

== Early life and education ==
Kadoda studied computer science at the University of Khartoum in 1991. She moved to the United Kingdom after graduating, where she studied information systems at City, University of London. She moved to Loughborough University for her doctoral studies, where she worked in software engineering.

== Research and career ==
As a postdoctoral researcher she joined Bournemouth University, where she worked on data mining and prediction. She moved to Imperial College London to develop data analysis and visualisation tools in 2001. Here she became interested in innovation, knowledge transfer and collaborations.

In 2003 Kadoda joined the University of the West Indies as a lecturer in computer science. She has since trained as a Certified Knowledge Manager and has served as President of the Sudanese Knowledge Society. She worked with two universities, the Sudan University of Science and Technology and University of Khartoum, to introduce innovation programs that support students in their entrepreneurial efforts. She is working to convert this activity into a stand-alone UNICEF Innovation Laboratory.

Kadoda was a founding member of Mehen, a training centre for women. She has called for decolonial and feminist education in Sudanese schools and universities, as well as leading anti-racist workshops. She is a member of the International Union Against Tuberculosis and Lung Disease and Sudan National Information Centre, as well as organising the Sudanese Equitable Futures Network. She delivered a TED talk in Khartoum in 2011.

In 2014 Kadoda was selected as One to Watch by UNICEF. She was selected as one of BBC's 100 Women in 2019.

=== Selected publications ===
Her publications include;

- Kadoda, Gada (2016). Networks of Knowledge Production in Sudan: Identities, Mobilities, and Technologies. Lexington Books. ISBN 978-1498532129.
- Kadoda, Gada; Shepperd, Martin (2001). "Comparing software prediction techniques using simulation". IEEE Transactions on Software Engineering. 27 (11): 1014–1022. Bibcode:2001ITSEn..27.1014S. doi:10.1109/32.965341.
- Kadoda, Gada; Webster, Steven (2000). "An investigation of machine learning based prediction systems" (PDF). Journal of Systems and Software. 53: 23–29. doi:10.1016/S0164-1212(00)00005-4.
