= List of high schools in Paraguay =

An incomplete list of schools in Paraguay:

Type: PU – Public, PR – Private, PS – Private-Subsidized
Yes – If the institution have the program
No – If the institution does not have the program
EMD – Enseñanza Media Diversificada

== Asunción ==
=== Public ===
Institution name	Type	Religious	Shift	Secondary Educ.		Web Page
Institution name	Type	Religious	Shift	Bachillerato Científico	Bachillerato Técnico	Web Page
Colegio Nacional de la Capital Gral. Bernardino Caballero	PU		Morning, Afternoon, Night	Yes	Adm. de Negocios; Informática; Contabilidad	Web site

=== Private ===
Institution name	Type	Religious	Shift	Secondary Educ.		Web Page
Institution name	Type	Religious	Shift	Bachillerato Científico	Bachillerato Técnico	Web Page
American School of Asunción	PR		Morning, Afternoon	Yes	No	Web site
Asunción Christian Academy	PR	Catholic	Morning, Afternoon	Yes	No	
Colegio Cristo Rey	PR	Catholic	Morning	Yes	Adm. de Negocios	Web site
Colegio Dante Alighieri	PR		Morning	Yes	No	Web site

== Additional schools ==
- Escuela Central de Niñas (1869)

== See also ==
- List of universities in Paraguay
- List of schools by country
