= Kenita Placide =

Saint Lucian human rights, HIV, and LGBT activist

Kenita Placide is a human rights, HIV, and LGBT activist from St. Lucia. They are the founder and Executive Director the Eastern Caribbean Coordinator of Caribbean Forum for Liberation and Acceptance of Genders and Sexualities (CariFLAGS). Between 2014 and 2016, they served at the Women's Secretariat for the International Lesbian, Gay, Bisexual, Trans and Intersex Association. They have been on the forefront of bringing LGBT issues into discussion throughout the Anglo-Caribbean and international community.

== Biography ==
Placide grew up in the Castries Quarter of Faux A Chaux in St. Lucia, attending Canon Laurie Primary and Vide Boutielle Secondary School. They studied women's psychology and women's human rights at the Athabasca University and University of Toronto and was trained in HIV testing, counseling, and facilitating. They later studied Computer Systems Analysis and Design and Computer Maintenance and Repair at the Sir Arthur Lewis Community College.

=== Advocacy ===
Placide's activism began at Vide Boutielle as a member of the school's Drug Free Club, where they served as a representative to the island's AIDS Committee and attended government health meetings from 1996 to 2000. In 2000, they co-founded United and Strong as an advocacy group to address the HIV/AIDS pandemic, and the organization was registered in 2005. In 2006, Placide represented United and Strong at a regional meeting, and the following year was elected to the Board of the organization and served as its Executive Director from 2014 to 2016. With Placide joining the Board, United and Strong transitioned from a primarily health-driven initiative to a human rights advocacy organization. While the organization's primary focus is the elimination of stigma and discrimination against lesbian, gay, bisexual, transgender, and intersex (LGBTI) people, the organization seeks justice for all marginalized communities.

In 2008, Placide addressed the Constitution Reform Commission urging the elimination of discrimination against LGBT citizens, and in 2009 they participated in St. Lucia's Universal Periodic Review for the United Nations. The Review occurred in 2011, and United and Strong was the only NGO from St. Lucia to submit a shadow report.

In 2010, Placide was elected as a Secretary-General Alternate for the International Lesbian, Gay, Bisexual, Trans and Intersex Association (ILGA), served as the Alternate Women's Secretariat from 2012, and was elected as the ILGA Women's Secretariat in 2014. In 2016, their colleague Jessica St Rose took the position. Placide also serves on the board of the Caribbean Alliance for Equality (CAE).

In July 2011, Placide organized the first regional LGBT security and human rights training for the Organization of Eastern Caribbean States (OECS), and in 2013 organized a regional documentation training for activists. In February 2012, they coordinated the first seminar in the Caribbean for International Dialogue on Human Rights. That same year, Placide led a public dialogue with the Ministry of Education and the Prime Minister's office on the theme “Eradicate hate, educate”. The annual dialogue included the topic "education and awareness are the building blocks of acceptance and love" for 2015. In 2013, Placide and United and Strong, in conjunction with Fundashon Orguyo Korsou (Curaçao Pride Foundation) (FOKO) from Curaçao, hosted a Caribbean Women and Sexual Diversity Conference, which brought together LBT women from 14 Caribbean countries in a networking and leadership session.

Placide received an award in 2012 from ILGA for their activism in spite of threats and the destruction of United and Strong's offices in an arson attack. In 2013, they were selected as STAR People’s Choice for Person of the Year in St. Lucia, the first time an LGBT person had been honored with the award in St. Lucia.
