= Xavier, Guayaquil =

- Spanish: Unidad Educativa Javier

Location
- Vía a la Costa; Guayaquil; Ecuador
- Coordinates: 2°10′2.99″S 79°56′1.89″W

Information
- Type: Private pre-school, primary and secondary school
- Religious affiliation: Catholicism
- Denomination: Jesuit
- Patron saint: Francis Xavier
- Established: 1956; 70 years ago
- Rector: Fabricio Alaña Echanique
- Staff: 230
- Grades: Pre-school; K-12
- Gender: Boys (1956-2003); Co-educational (since 2004)
- Enrollment: 1,564
- Website: uejavier.com

Xavier, Guayaquil (Spanish: Unidad Educativa Javier) is a private Catholic pre-school, primary and secondary school, located in Guayaquil, Ecuador. The school was established as a school for boys in 1956 by the Society of Jesus; and became coeducational in 2004.

== History ==
Xavier was founded by the Jesuits in Guayaquil in 1956, with 52 students. Construction of today's campus began in 1957. The college went coeducational in 2004. After an earthquake in 2010 the Ecuadoran government contributed to the rebuilding of the school.

== See also ==
- Catholic Church in Ecuador
- Education in Ecuador
- List of Jesuit schools
