= Colegio Nacional de la Capital =

Colegio Nacional de la Capital "Gral. Bernardino Caballero"
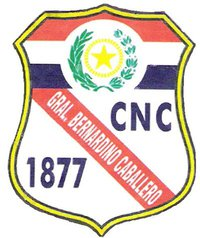

Location
- 530 Eusebio Ayala; Asunción, Paraguay
- Coordinates: 25.3023°S 57.6176°W

Information
- Type: Public secondary
- Established: January 4, 1877
- Principal: Raúl Aguilera Méndez
- Gender: Coeducational
- Campus: Urban
- Nickname: CNC
- Website: www.mec.gov.py/cnc

Colegio Nacional de la Capital "Gral. Bernardino Caballero" (or simply CNC) is a public high school in Asunción, Paraguay. The school is one of the most prestigious in Paraguay. Many personalities have studied there.

== History ==
The CNC was established on January 4, 1877, and was named after General Bernardino Caballero, hero of the Paraguayan War and former president of the country.

It was located where the present day Asunción Escalada National Highschool is located. In 1950 it moved to the property where it is located at present, on Eusebio Ayala Avenue. The first teacher appointed was Professor Gaston Riviere to French class. Then the following teachers were appointed: Eugenio Bertoin, Dr. José María Pérez, Pascual Vía, Fr. Facundo Bienes y Girón, Carlos Duval, Rodney Croskey, Cristóbal Campos y Sánchez, Domingo Jiménez, and Leopoldo Gómez de Terán.

From its inception until 2004 the school was only for men, from 2004 to date the school is coed.

== Alumni ==
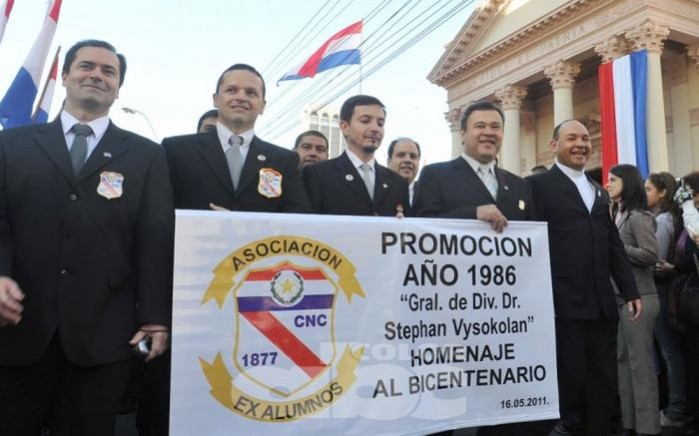
Alumni

Alumni include many Presidents, members of political parties of all ideologies, internationally recognized scientists, artists and ideologists. A partial list includes:

- Agustín Pío Barrios, guitarist and composer
- Alejandro Guanes, poet
- Arturo Alsina, writer
- David Galeano Olivera, linguist
- Delfín Chamorro, educator
- Félix Toranzos, artist
- Fulgencio R. Moreno, journalist
- Gabriel Casaccia, novelist
- Lino Oviedo, army general and politician
- Manuel Ortiz Guerrero, poet and musician
- Nicolás Léoz, football manager

=== Presidents of the country ===
- Andrés Héctor Carvallo Acosta (1902, ANR)
- Cecilio Báez (1905–1906, PLRA)
- Emiliano González Navero (1908–1909, 1912 and 1931–1932, PLRA)
- Albino Jara (1911, PLRA)
- Eduardo Schaerer (1912–1916, PLRA)
- Manuel Franco (1916–1919, PLRA)
- José Pedro Montero (1919–1920, PLRA)
- Eusebio Ayala (1921–1923 and 1932–1936, PLRA)
- Eligio Ayala (1923–1924 and 1924–1928, PLRA)
- José Patricio Guggiari (1928–1932, PLRA)
- Rafael Franco (1936–1937, PRF)
- Juan Manuel Frutos (1948, ANR)
- Tomás Romero Pereira (1954, ANR)

== See also ==
- List of high schools in Paraguay
