= Urdesa =

Neighborhood in Guayaquil, Ecuador

Urdesa is a neighborhood in the city of Guayaquil, Ecuador.

== History ==
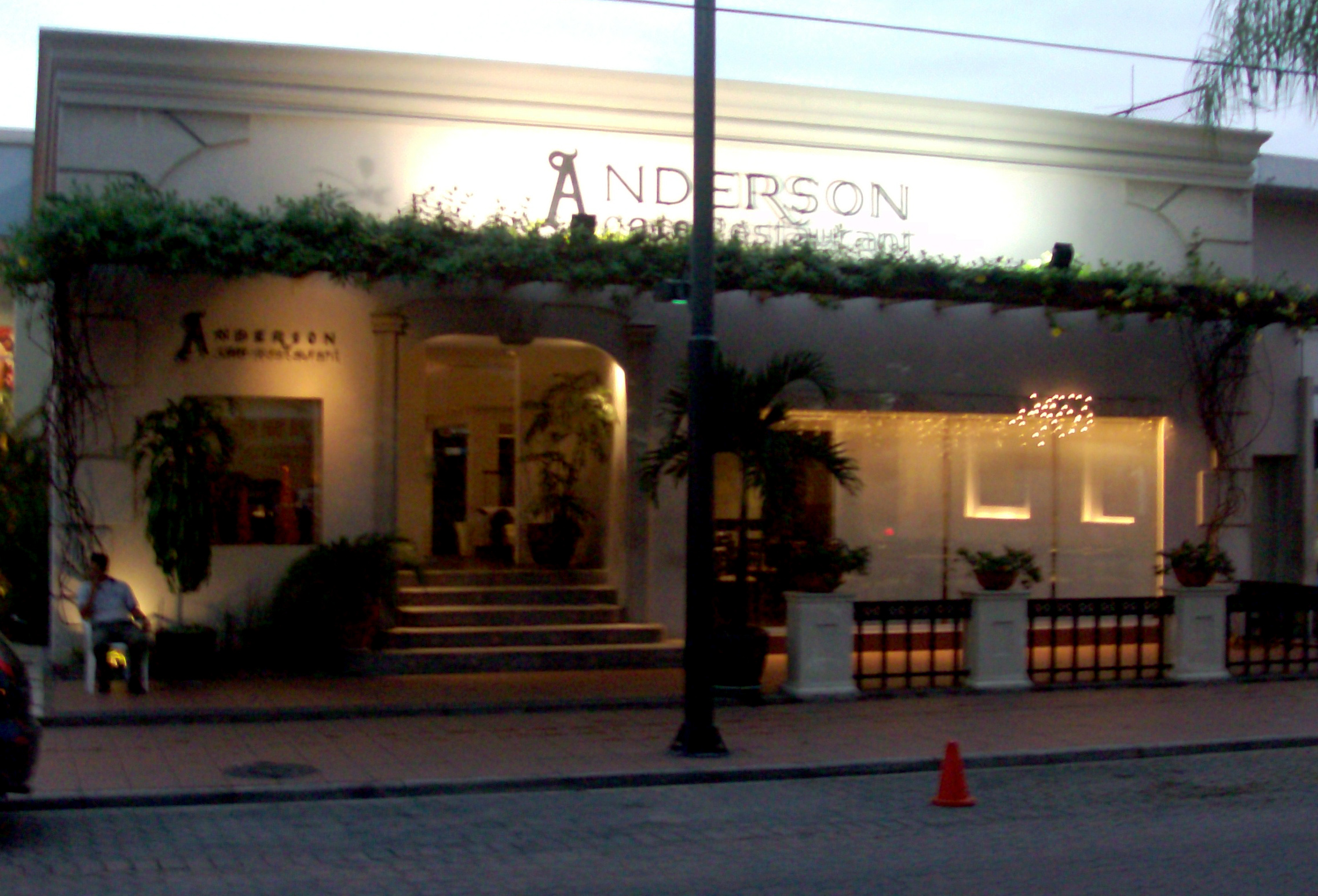
French food restaurant in the neighborhood

The name Urdesa comes from Urbanización del Salado which means "neighborhood by the estuary". The quarter was born as an urbanism project north to the city for the middle and upper class around 1956. The neighborhood lies on the estuary side and soon began with the construction of mansions with beautiful gardens and no fences. The German School Guayaquil opened its doors on 1958, as the first school in the neighborhood. Nevertheless, the school resettled in 1968 in the new neighborhood Los Ceibos. But by then, URDESA had already other educational institutions.

In the 1990s all villas got a garden fence for security reasons. With time, not only mansions were constructed, but smaller middle-class houses as well and Urdesa lost its high society status.

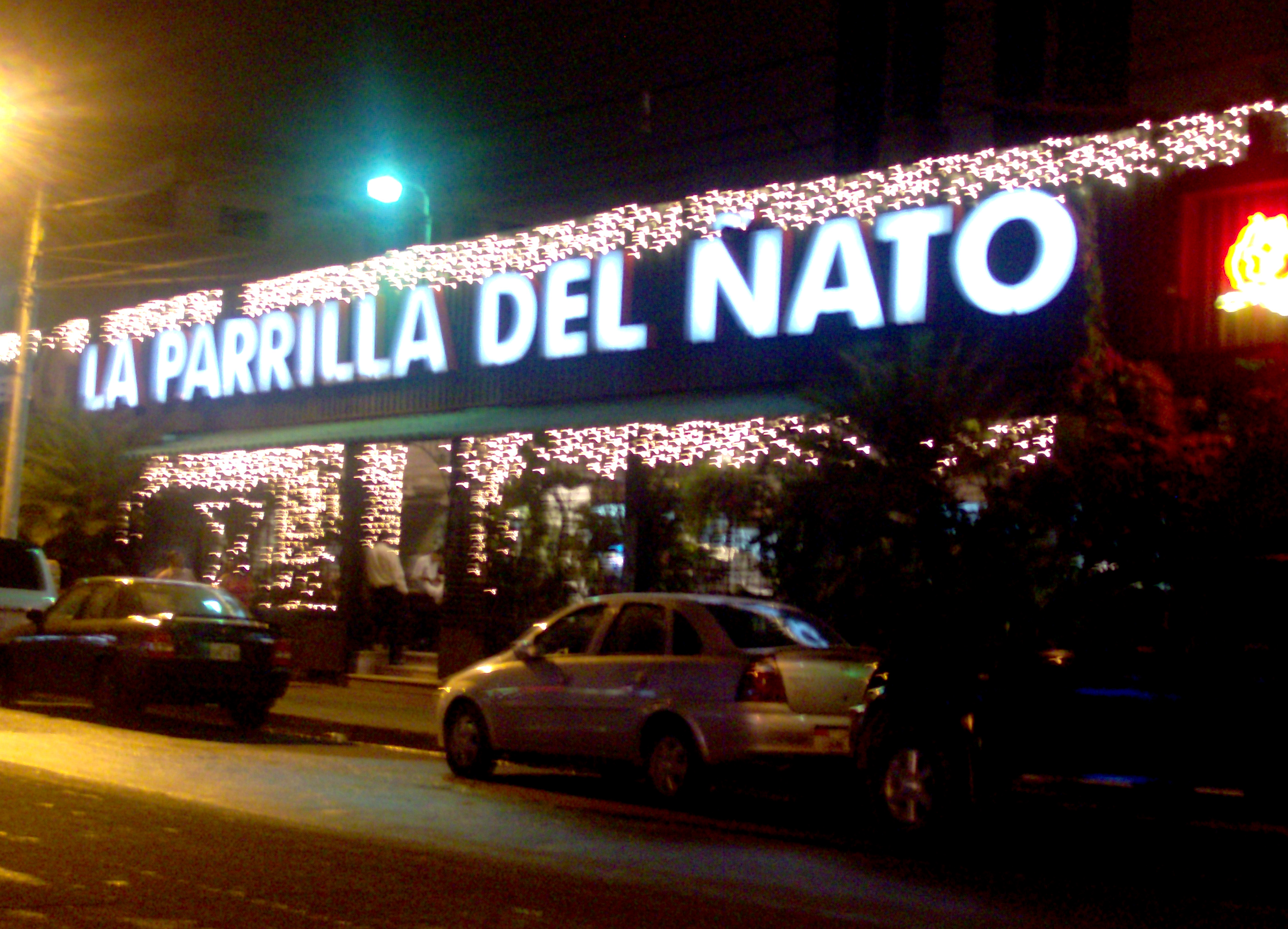
Steakhouse, traditional restaurant in the city

The new part of the quarter is named North Urdesa. It has smaller streets and affordable houses for the middle class. In the 1980s it was rapidly densely populated and by the 1990s it already reached the 6th Avenue where it merged with Urdenor, a project for the lower middle class, until the Juan Tanca Marengo Avenue.

The quarter grew over the years and today it is the north downtown with many retail stores, restaurants, bars and traffic. Also the neighborhood has a significant Arab, Middle Eastern, South Asian, and East Asian populations. There are 15 Lebanese-owned businesses, 8 Chinese-owned businesses, 2 Indian-owned businesses, and a total of 40 foreign-owned businesses. Also, the crime rate has risen and many of the old neighbors have moved away to newer urbanism projects like Samborondón for the high class, Los Ceibos for the upper and middle class.

== The Neighborhood ==
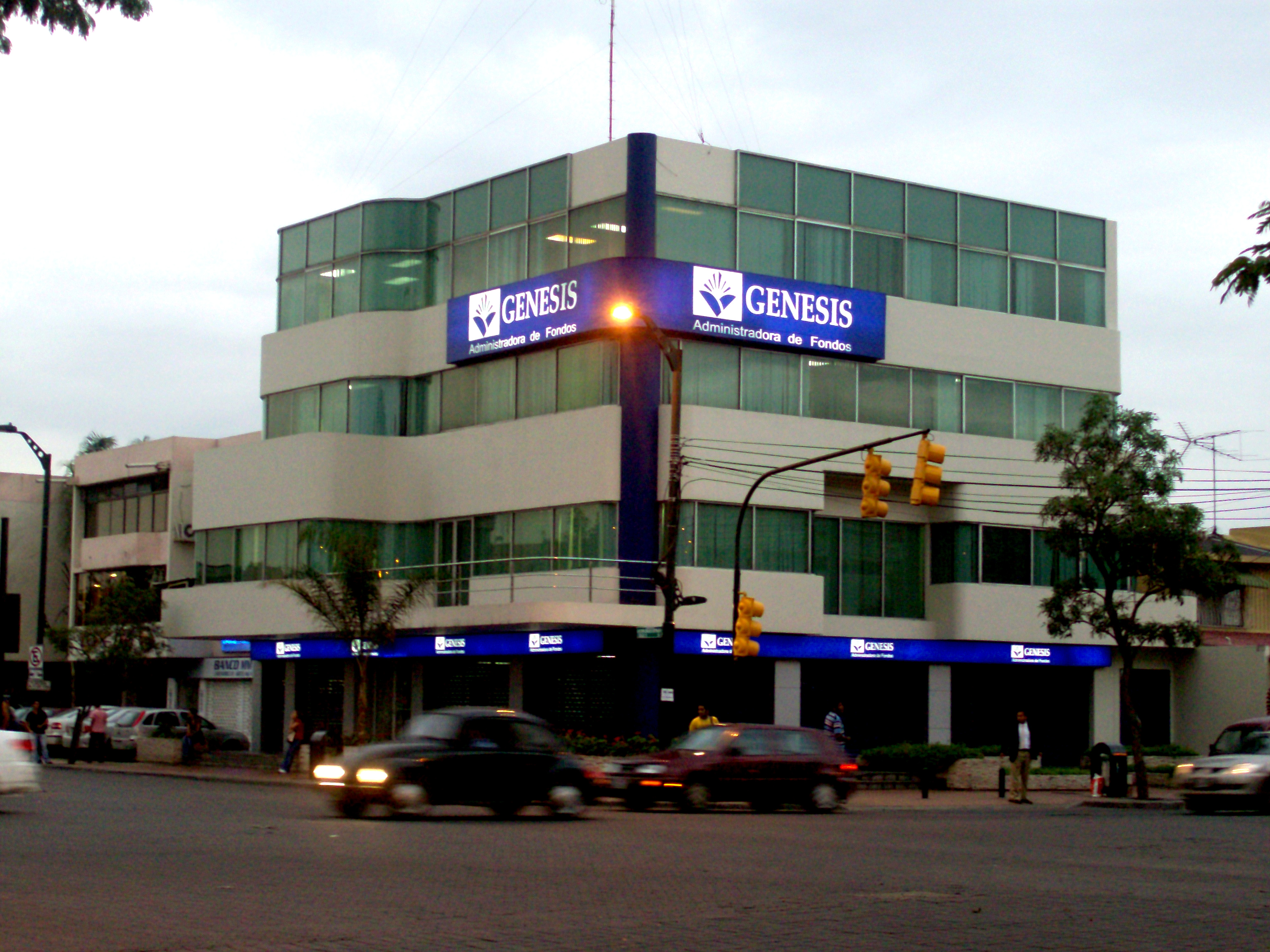
Insurance Agency, corner commercial area

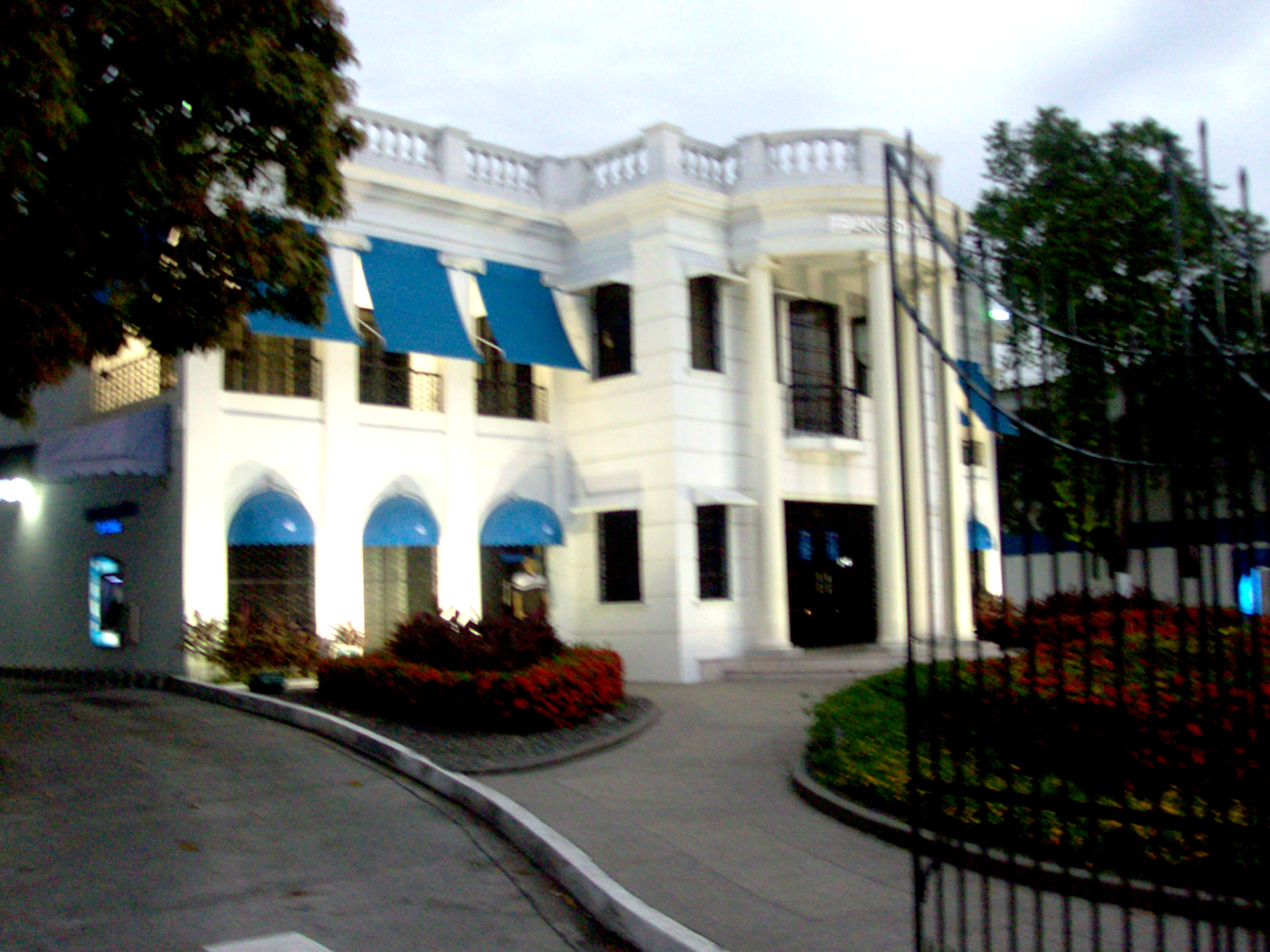
House converted into bank in Avenida Víctor Emilio Estrada

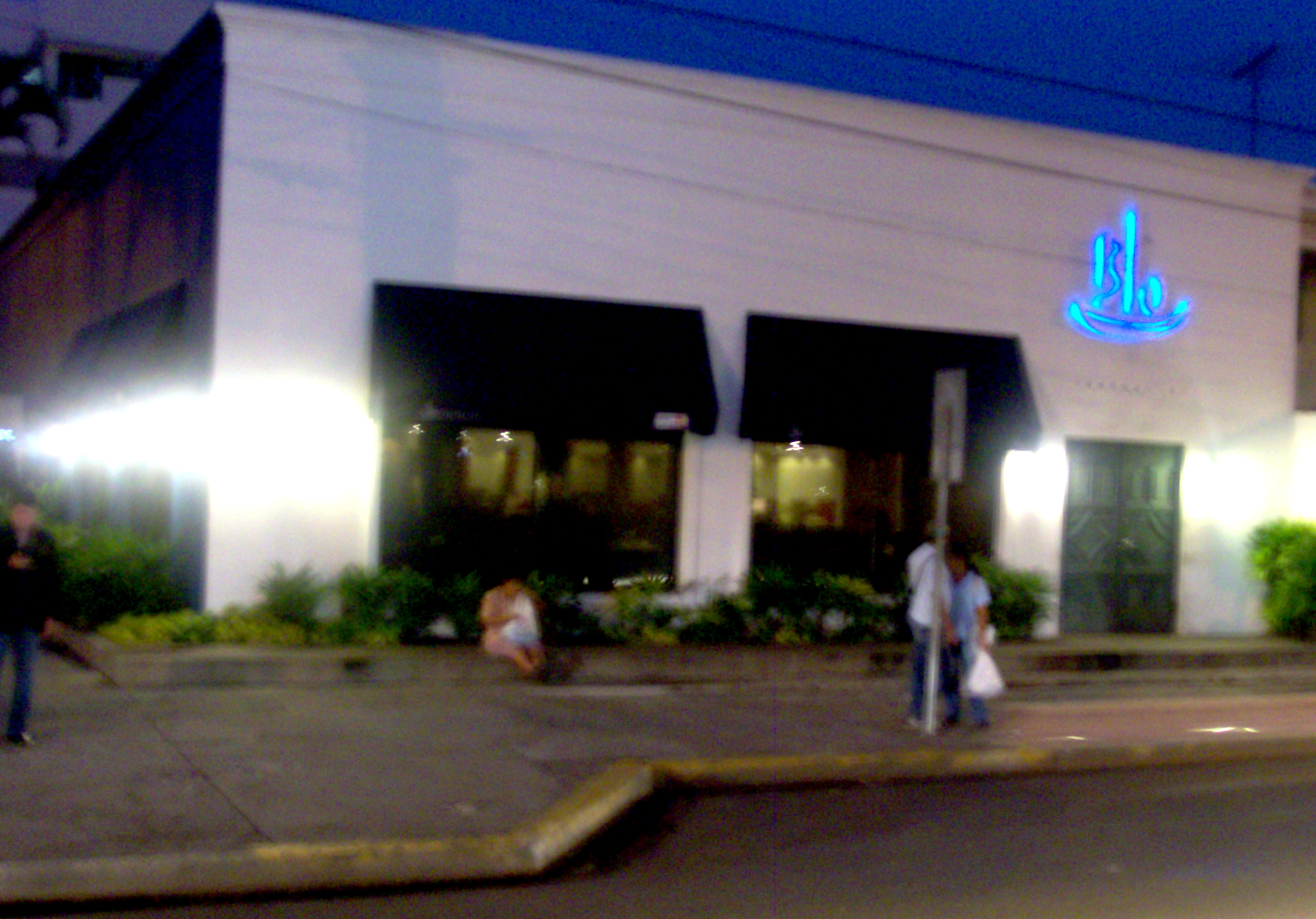
Blu Restaurant

Although on 1950s it was the geographical north of the city and even on the city's border, now it is the geographical center due to the exorbitant growing of Guayaquil. What is historically considered as the city center would actually be the geographical east. For this reason, Urdesa has become very transited and the main route to go from the residential Los Ceibos and all the neighborhoods around it to go downtown or to Samborondón.

The main street is Victor Emilio Estrada Avenue. On the street are many banks, restaurants, retail stores, bars, liqueur stores and office buildings.

Very characteristic to this quarter is that the streets on the quarter's center are alphabetical named after native trees: Acacia, Bálsamos (Myroxylon pereirae), Cedar, Date Palm, Ebony, Ficus, Guayacán, Fig, Ilanes, Jiguas, Laurel and Myrtle.

Today, Urdesa has been profoundly renovated by the city government. The main streets have been cobblestoned and the sidewalks were designed by a garden architect with beautiful trees and flowers. In spite of the commercial activity on the main streets, the mayor has successfully achieved that the side streets remain a residential area. Therefore, visual contamination (banners) are prohibited on the side streets, where the quarter is exclusively residential.

In 1997 the then-mayor León Febres-Cordero achieved what seemed impossible, namely getting the owners of the properties to renew their home fronts, especially the fences, because they were virtually on the public sidewalk leaving merely few centimeters for pedestrians to walk. After initial problems with the proprietors, who complained about high costs for removing only a meter or even a few centimeters, the then-mayor announced that if they didn't do it on themselves, the city hall personnel would do it by force. That scared most of the home owners and today, all of them have constructed new fences and there's finally enough sidewalks in order for pedestrians to walk.

Urdesa is a very diverse neighborhood, that has always had a foreign presence. In the 1950s and 1960s, Urdesa had sizable Lebanese, Turkish, German and Italian populations. Most of these immigrants where upper middle class to well off Merchants and businessmen. In the 1980s, Many refugees from Lebanon, made Urdesa their home of which some still live in the neighborhood till this day. Today there are many nationalities in the neighborhood including Lebanese, Turks, Indians, Chinese, Iranians, Russians, Afghans, Pakistanis, Romanians and Iraqis, also there is a new wave of Immigrants from Syria fleeing the civil war. Shawarma can be found anywhere in the neighborhood, and there are many Halal Restaurants and Hookah bars.

== See also ==
- Guayaquil
- Sectors of Guayaquil
- List of Neighborhoods of Guayaquil
