= Garden City, Khartoum =

Neighbourhood in Sudan

Garden City قاردن سيتي
- Neighbourhood
- Location in Sudan
- Coordinates: 15°38′3″N 32°32′13″E
- Country: Sudan
- State: Khartoum
- City: Khartoum
- Time zone: Central Africa Time, GMT + 3

Garden City (Arabic: قاردن سيتي) is a neighbourhood located in Khartoum, the capital city of Sudan. It is situated near Burrī al Maḩas and is part of the Khartoum State.

As a part of Khartoum, Garden City is in close proximity to several landmarks and important places. The University of Khartoum, a well-known public university, is situated about 2.5 kilometres west of Garden City. There are various streets and areas within or nearby Garden City, such as Prince Ahmed Khair Street, Gorashi Garden Roundabout, and Sahafa Street, among others.

École Française Internationale de Khartoum (EFIK) is a French international school in Garden City, Khartoum, Sudan. The school was established in 1980 as the École Française de Khartoum and received its current name in 2014. Additionally, there is another institution named the University of Garden City, which is a private higher education institution located in Khartoum. It was established in 2015 and offers courses and programs leading to officially recognized bachelor's and master's degrees in several study areas.
