= Burri Almahas =

Neighbourhood in Sudan

Burri Almahas بري المحس
- Neighbourhood
- Location in Sudan
- Coordinates: 15°36′18″N 32°33′15″E
- Country: Sudan
- State: Khartoum
- City: Khartoum
- Founded: 1575
- Elevation: 389 m (1,276 ft)
- Time zone: Central Africa Time, GMT + 3

Burri Almahas (Arabic: بري المحس) is a neighbourhood located in the state of Khartoum within northern region of the city of Khartoum, and it is one of the old neighbourhoods of Khartoum.

The name consists of two parts: Berri which is derived from "Bar Toti", while the Mahas are the ethnicity that formed the first inhabitants of Tuti Island. Some of them preferred to move from Tuti Island to the mainland of Khartoum because of their cultivation, and they established Al-Mahas land as the first inhabited settlement in Khartoum in 1575.

Burri Almahas is situated nearby to the neighbourhoods of Garden City and Burri al-Drayssa, and home to the Burri Sports Club.

Burri Almahas has a Köppen climate type of BWh, which indicates a hot desert climate. The area's elevation is approximately 389 metres (1,276 ft) above sea level. The district's quality of life might be impacted by factors such as air pollution, availability of parks and green spaces, and garbage disposal, among others.
