= Gabriel Casaccia =

Paraguayan novelist

Benigno Gabriel Casaccia Bibolini
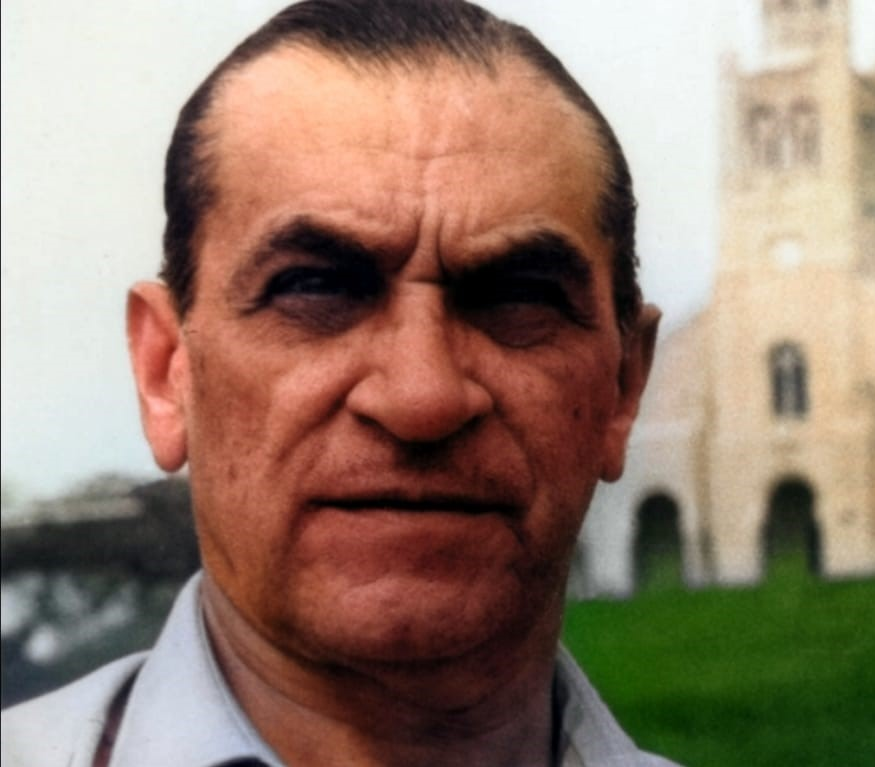
- Born: April 20, 1907; Asunción, Paraguay
- Died: November 24, 1980 (aged 73); Buenos Aires, Argentina
- Occupations: Novelist, short story writer, playwright
- Writing career
- Genre: Modern realism
- Notable works: La Babosa, La Llaga

Benigno Gabriel Casaccia Bibolini (April 20, 1907 – November 24, 1980) was a Paraguayan novelist. He is considered the father of modern Paraguayan literature. Augusto Roa Bastos, another notable Paraguayan novelist, is quoted as saying “Gabriel Casaccia is the founder of modern Paraguayan narrative, which gives, in good measure, a fundamental character to all of his work and, to its author, the unusual merit of having launched the genre in a country which was fictionally unknown.”

== Life ==
Casaccia was born in Asunción, Paraguay. He was the son of Benigno Casaccia and Margarita Bibolini, both Italian immigrants. He studied at the Colegio Nacional de la Capital, one of the most prestigious public high schools in the country, and finished his Law studies at Universidad Nacional de Asuncion. Cassacia then started work as a journalist, writing for El Liberal, El Diario and several other magazines in Asunción before devoting himself entirely to fiction. During his first 17 years as a writer he used the name "Benigno Casaccia Bibolini", until he adopted the name of "Gabriel Casaccia", under which his best known works were produced.

Casaccia lived the majority of his life in Argentina, first in Posadas and then Buenos Aires. He married an Argentinian woman named Carmen Dora Parola.

Casaccia died in Buenos Aires, on November 24, 1980.

== Works ==
Casaccia authored seven novels, two short stories, and a play. Ordered chronologically, his works are:

- “Hombres y Mujeres Fantoches” (1930)
- “El Bandolero” (1932)
- “El Guajhu” (1938)
- “Mario Pareda” (1939)
- ”El Pozo” (1947)
- ”La Babosa" (1952)
- “La Llaga” (1963)
- ”Los Exiliados” (1966)
- “Los Herederos” (1975)
- “Los Huertas” (1981), which was published posthumously
