= List of schools in Sudan =

This is a list of notable primary and secondary schools located in the African country of Sudan.

== Khartoum State ==
=== Garden City ===
- École Française Internationale de Khartoum

=== Khartoum ===
- Gordon Memorial College – defunct primary and secondary school
- Kitchener School of Medicine
- Khartoum American School
- Khartoum International Community School
- Unity High School

== See also ==
- Education in Sudan
