= Asunción Escalada =

Paraguayan educator (1850 - 1894)

Asunción Escalada (1850–1894) was a Paraguayan educator.

== Life ==
Asunción Escalada was born in Asunción on August 27, 1850. She was the granddaughter of the Argentine educator Juan Pedro Escalada (1777–1869), and the daughter of Juan Manuel Escalada and Casimira Benítez. Escalada started teaching during the War Of The Triple Alliance, working at a small primary school in Atyrá. Nearing the end of the war she was forced to abandon the town, accompanying her grandfather to Cerro Corá.

In October 1869 Escalada wrote an article championing women's education in the first issue of the newspaper La Regeneración, Paraguay's first privately owned periodical. In November 1869, under her direction, the Central School for Girls opened in Asunción. According to some sources, she stayed at the school until 1875; according to other sources, she only stayed at the Central School for a short period before opening her own private school, which she directed until 1875.

She married the politician Jaime Sosa Escalada. Their children included Marcial Sosa Escalala (1873–?), and the guitarist Gustavo Sosa Escalada (1877–1943). Escalada also encouraged culture and the arts in Paraguay, giving patronage to her son Gustavo Sosa's student, the guitarist Agustín Barrios.

Exiled with her husband, Asunción Escalada died in Buenos Aires on December 11, 1894. The Asunción Escalada National Highschool is named after her.
