= Escuela Central de Niñas =

First-ever girls' school in Paraguay

The Escuela Central de Niñas (Central School for Girls) was the first girls' school in Paraguay.

The school opened on 7 November 1869, under the direction of Doña Asunción Escalada.
