= Félix Toranzos =

Paraguayan artist, architect and graphic designer

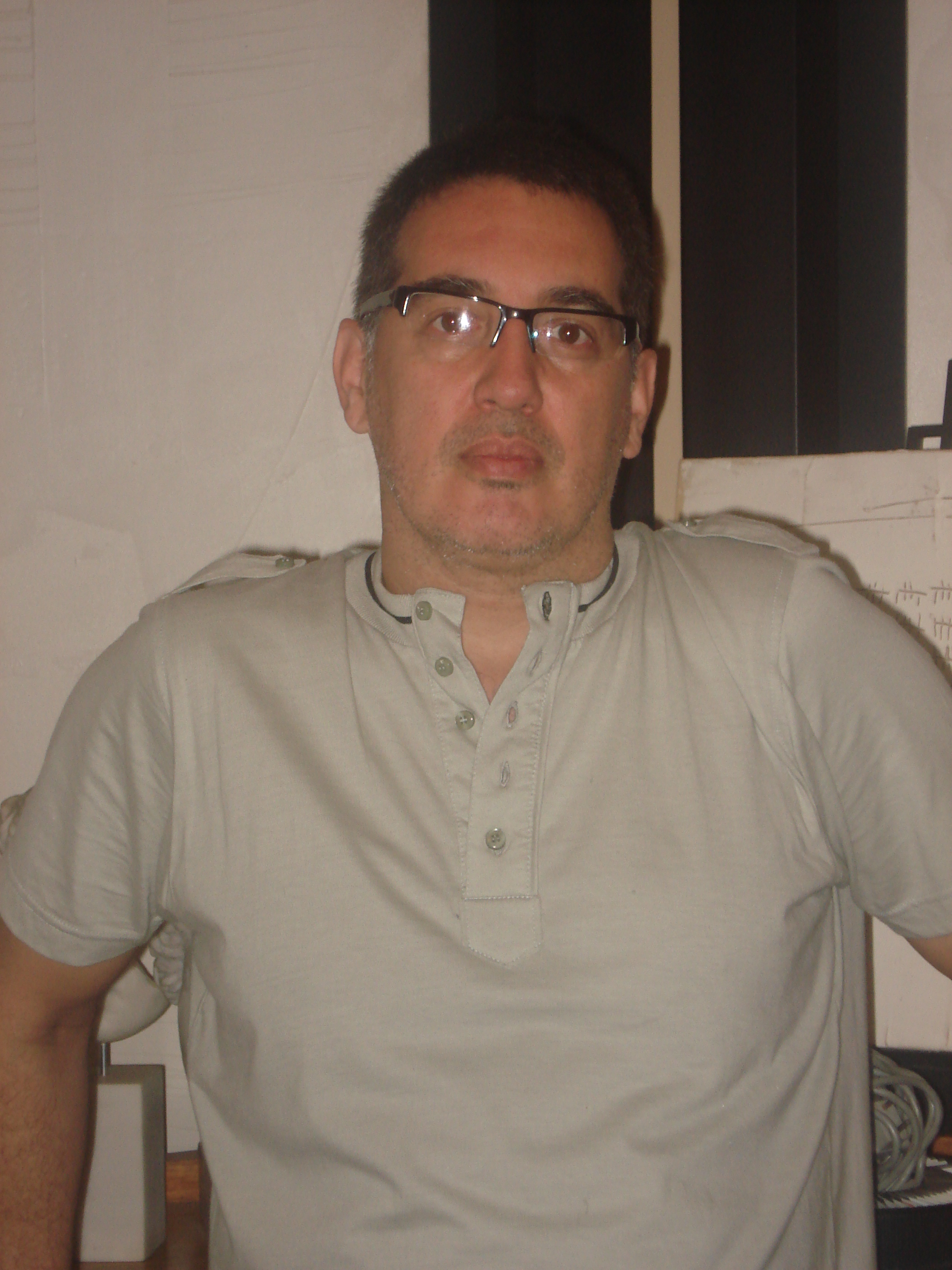
- Born: Félix Toranzos Miers; October 30, 1962 (age 63); Asunción, Paraguay
- Known for: artist
- Notable work: "Geometrías", "Asunción, los escenarios de la utopía"
- Awards: Prize "Pedro Agüero", Asunción, Paraguay. 1998

Félix Toranzos (born October 30, 1962) is a Paraguayan artist, architect and graphic designer. He is considered to be one of the most conspicuous representatives of the new generation of artists in Paraguay.

== Early life ==
Toranzos was born in Asunción on October 30, 1964. His parents are Luis Toranzos an artist himself, and Angelina Miers, of Argentina. He attended the elementary school "General Eduvigis Diaz". His Secondary School was at Colegio Nacional de la Capital.

In 1973 and 1974, he conducted studies in the Escuela de Bellas Artes Asunción. In 1980 he ended his career of architecture, made in the National University of Asunción.

== His career ==
He has delivered classes in drawing and painting workshops at the Centre for Visual Arts, as part of a group of Paraguayan and foreign artists who devote part of their time to training young apprentices in the art, technique and taste for the aesthetic. His first sample dates back to 1979. Since then, he has raised to great heights his artistic production, which gave him a privileged place among Paraguayan painters, to become one of the most prominent artists of his generation. He has made significant individual and collective exhibitions organized by several galleries and art centers, Asunción Buenos Aires, Peru Spain, Brazil, Japan and the United States. His works are part of the collection of the Museum of Contemporary Art Paraguayan Centre for Visual Arts. They are also given in Museo del Barro Asunción.

Part of its plastic production, integrates the Collection of the Art Museum of the America of the Organization of American States Washington, D.C. (OAS Art Museum of the [United States) Numerous private collections of Paraguay and the United States contain his works, with some produced by Felix Toranzos.

== Works ==
Among his major solo exhibitions include:

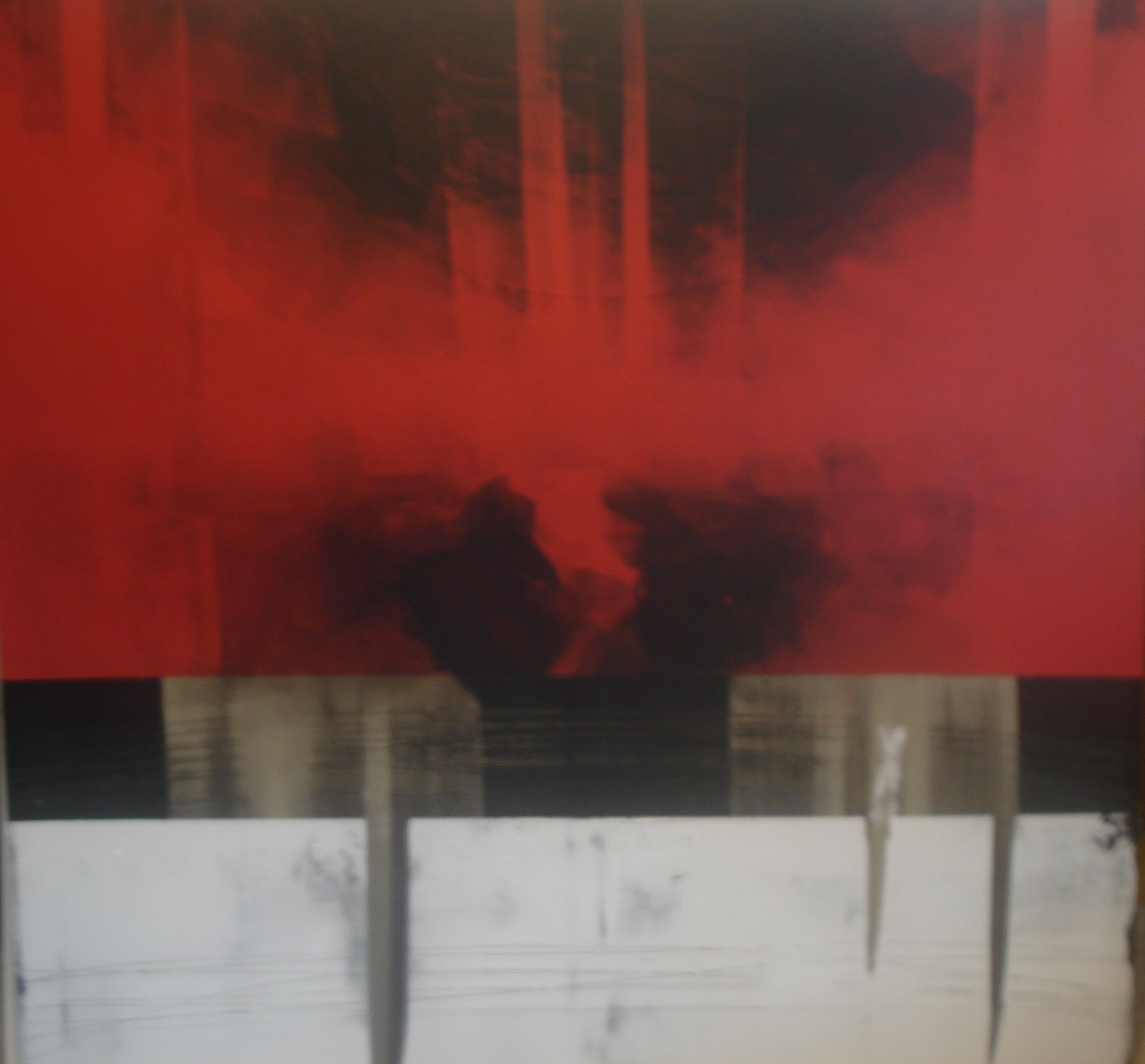

- 1979: Exhibition of Drawings, Galería Arte-Sanos.
- 1982: Designs, Exhibition of Drawings, Centro de Estudios Brasileros.
- 1983: Exhibition of Drawings and Objects, Galería Arte-Sanos.
- 1985: "Transvisión de Palladio", Drawings and other techniques, Galería Fábrica.
- 1986/87: Drawing and Paintings, Galería Arte-Sanos.

"Intro-Misiones", Drawings and other techniques, Galería Fábrica. Exhibition of Drawings, Café de la Plaza.

- 1988: "Asunción-Una Escenografía Utópica". Drawings and other techniques, Galería Fábrica.

Paintings Exhibition, Café de la Plaza.

- 1989: Paintings Exhibition, Condovac, San Bernardino.

Paintings Exhibition, Galería Fábrica. Paintings Exhibition, Fundapel, Salón Municipal, Pelotas Brasil.

- 1990: Paintings Exhibition, Galería Fábrica.

Paintings Exhibition, Galería Arte-Sanos.

- 1991: Objects Exhibition, Pequeña Galería.

Paintings Exhibition, Galería Arte-Sanos. Objects and Paintings Exhibition, Galería Fábrica. Watercolor Exhibition, Galería Forum. Watercolor Exhibition, Galería Arte-Nuestro, Villa Rica.

- 1992: Cajas y Objetos, Pequeña Galería.

Drawings and Objects Exhibition, Galería Arte-Nuestro, Villa Rica. Watercolor Exhibition, Café de la Plaza. Drawings and Painting Exhibition, Galería Ana Scappini.

- 1993: Objects and Paintings, Centro Cultural de la Ciudad.

Objects and Paintings, Centro de Arte, Corriente Alterna, Lima, Peru. Drawings Exhibition, Galería El Patio. Paintings Exhibition, Galería Arte-Sanos.

- 1994: "Onomástico", Paintings Exhibition, Galería Fábrica.

"Asunción-Otra Escenografía Utópica", Galería de Arte del Patio López.

- 1995: Paintings Exhibition, Galería Lamarca.

"Taller de Arquitectura", Drawings Exhibition, Espacio Miguel Acevedo, Centro Cultural de la Ciudad. "Buonarroti, los trazos preliminares", Drawings and Paintings, Galería Fábrica.

- 1996: Paintings Exhibition, Aniversario Da Vinci Café.

"Delgado Rodas, Los trazos preliminares", Drawings and Paintings, Galería Fábrica. "Asunción, los escenarios de la utopía", Galería Scappini-Lamarca. "Objects and collage", Galería Fábrica. "Leonardo, los primeros trazos", Verónica Torres, Colección de Arte.

- 1997: "Sueños Robados", objects and collage, Galería Fábrica.
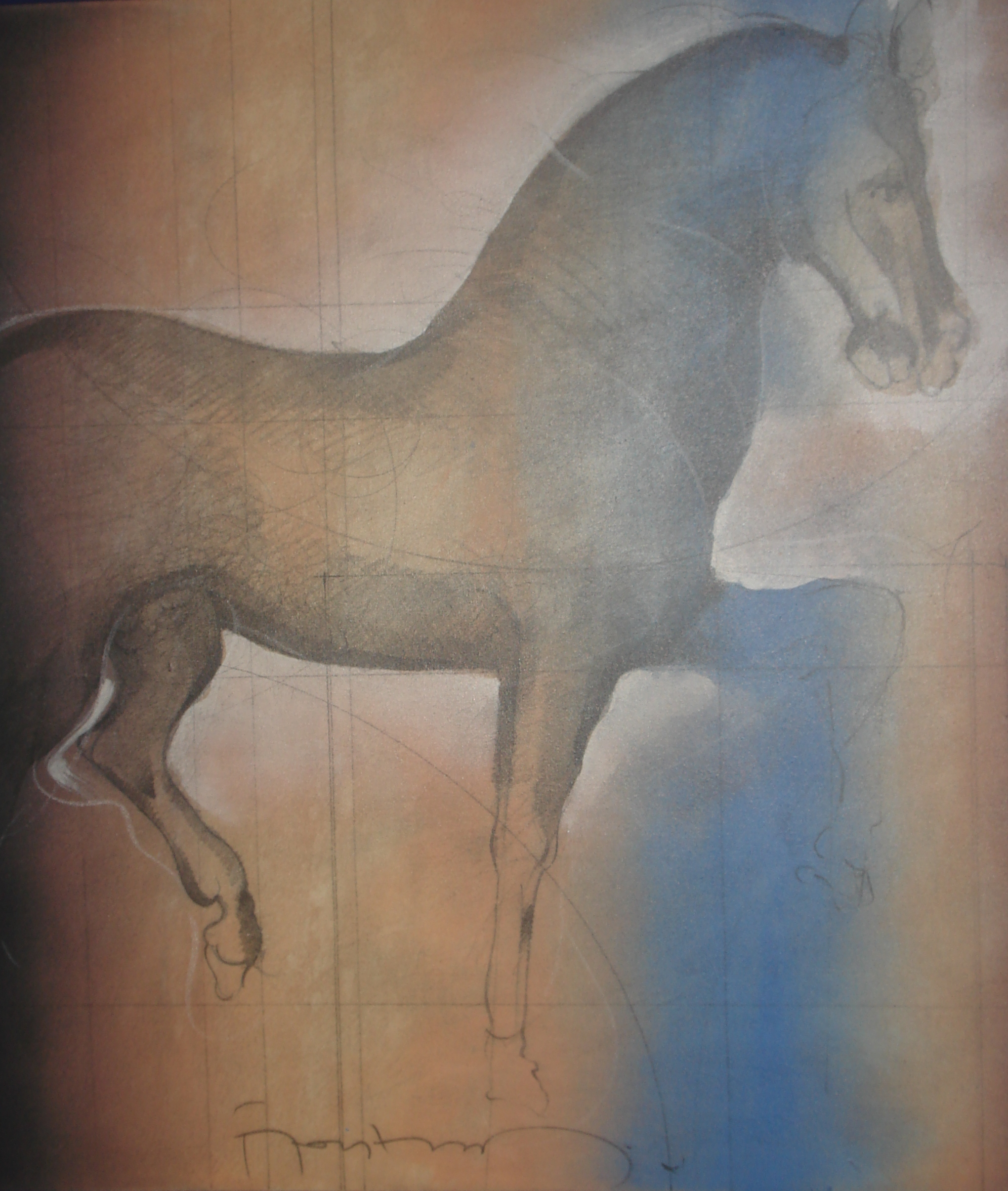
- 1998: "Primigenia", Collage and Paintings, Gabinete Florian Paucke, Centro de Artes Visuales/Museo del Barro.
- 1999: Paintings Exhibition, Centro de Artes Visuales/Museo del Barro.

"Primigenia", paintings and collage, Galería Scappini-Lamarca.

- 2000: "Geometrías", Paintings, Centro Cultural Citibank.

"La Estancia de Rafael", Paintings, Galería Fábrica.

- 2001: Paintings Exhibition, Centro Cultural CitiBank.

“Trans-visión de Palladio”. Galería Fábrica.

- 2002: “Fuschias y otras flores”, Verónica Torres, Colección de Arte.
- 2003: Objects and Paintings Exhibition, Galería Fábrica.
- 2004: Objects and Paintings Exhibition. Galería Fábrica.
- 2005: Drawings and Paintings Exhibition "Botticelli", Galería Matices.

Drawings and Paintings Exhibition, Centro Cultural Citibank. Objects and Paintings Exhibition, Galería Fabrica.

- 2006: "Una Interpretación de la Obra de Luís Toranzos", Verónica Torres Colección de Arte.

"La Resistencia de los materiales", Centro Cultural Español, Juan de Salazar. Drawings and Paintings Exhibition. Galería Matices. Paintings Exhibition, Centro Cultural Citibank.

Likewise, he has taken part in numerous exhibitions, and biennial collective samples in Asunción and other major cities around the world.

Year	Main Exhibitions
1979	La Plástica Joven en el Paraguay, Centro Cultural Paraguayo Americano. Asunción.
1982/1983	Prize "Benson&Hedges" Artes Visuales. Asunción.
1984	9th. International Drawing Exhibition, Modern Art Museum, Rijeka, Yugoslavia. Muestra de cajas y objetos, Galería Fábrica. Asunción. "Arte Experimental" 10th. Anniversary, Galería Arte-Sanos. Asunción.
1985	Luís y Félix Toranzos` Paintings, Galería Arte-Sanos. Asunción. "Plástica Paraguaya Actual", Galería Magister. Asunción.
1986	Bienal Latinoamericana de Arte sobre papel. Buenos Aires, Argentina.
1987	"Interiores", Galería Arte-Sanos. Asunción. "La luz y la imagen", Galería Miró. Asunción. 19º Bienal Internacional de Arte São Paulo, Brazil.
1988	"De regiones y paisajes", Galería Arte-Sanos. Asunción. Paraguay. "Eros y Thanatos", Galería 530. "Naturarte", Galería Arte-Sanos. Asunción. Paraguay. 5ta. Bienal del Retrato, Tuzla, Yugoslavia. "Homenaje a la Ciudad de Asunción", Banco Unión, Galería Arte-Sanos. Asunción. Paraguay. Luis y Félix Toranzos` Paintings, Galería Arte-Sanos. Asunción. Paraguay. "Espacios y construcciones", "De realismos y Surrealismos", Galería Arte-Sanos/ San Bernardino, Paraguay.
1989	"Acto de Libertad", Galería Arte-Sanos. 1ra. Bienal de Arte Joven, Buenos Aires, Argentina. "Dos momentos en la Pintura Paraguaya Contemporánea", Galería PRAXIS, Buenos Aires, Argentina.
1990	"Homenaje a Van Gogh", Centro Cultural Paraguayo Americano. Asunción. Paraguay.
1991	Exposición de Arte Emergente, Nagoya, Japan. "Siete Pintores del Paraguay", Centro Cultural Puerta de Toledo, Madrid, Spain. Semana Cultural Paraguaya, Salón Dorado, Teatro Colón, Buenos Aires, Argentina. Exposición de Pinturas, Galería Ana Scappini. Asunción. Paraguay.
1992	Diez dibujantes paraguayos, Centro Cultural de la Universidade Federal de Minas Gerais, Brazil. Diez Pintores Paraguayos, Centro Cultural Misiones, Posadas, Argentina. "RE-Renacimiento", Galería Arte-Sanos. Asunción. Paraguay. "Colombino, y cuatro artistas del Paraguay", Galería Centoira, Buenos Aires, Argentina.
1993	Presencia del Paraguay, Galería Latinoamericana, Casa de las Américas, Havana, Cuba. "Ocho artistas del Paraguay", Museo de Arte de las Américas. OEA, Washington, D.C.. Homenaje a Miró, Galería El Patio. Asunción. Paraguay.
1994	Juan Montes y Félix Toranzos, Cantegril Country Club, Punta del Este, Uruguay. 15 Artistas Paraguayos, Centro de Arte, Corriente Alterna, Lima, Peru. Versiones de Cuatro Artistas, Galería de Arte del Patio López. Asunción. Paraguay. "Vento Sul", Exposición itinerante por Capitales Brasileñas. "Veinte Años, El ciclo de Arte-Sanos", Exposición Colectiva. Asunción. Paraguay. Sanguinetti/Toranzos, Galería Belmarco. Asunción. Paraguay. Homenaje a Pedro Aguero, Galería El Patio. Asunción. Paraguay. Ocho artistas paraguayos en Washington, Galería Fábrica. Asunción. Paraguay. Grabados de Artistas paraguayos, Galería Lamarca. Asunción. Paraguay.
1995	"Dos generaciones del Arte Paraguayo", Centro Cultural de la Municipalidad de Miraflores, Lima, Peru. "Apyka", Sillas del Paraguay. Centro Cultural de la Ciudad de Asunción. Vento-Sul, Exposición Itinerante latinoamericana, Casa Castelví, Centro Cultural de la Ciudad. Asunción. Paraguay. Artistas Brasileños y Paraguayos, salones de Promopar. Asunción. Paraguay. "Divagaciones sobre la caja", Galería Fábrica. Asunción. Paraguay. Susana Romero y Félix Toranzos, Cajas, Pequeña Galería. Asunción. Paraguay.
1996	Félix Toranzos and Grabadores Mexicanos` Paintings, Salones de Alba de Ahorros para la Vivienda. Asunción. Paraguay. Los tiempos de Goya, Galería Scappini-Lamarca. Asunción. Paraguay. El lenguaje del Abanico, Galería Fábrica. Asunción. Paraguay. Exposición Selección Premio La Nación. Asunción. Paraguay.
1997	International Exhibitions. Lima, Perú. XXVII Asamblea General de la OEA, Museo de Osma, Lima, Perú. Collective Exhibition, Galería Scappini-Lamarca. Asunción. Paraguay. 1ra. Bienal de Arte del Mercosur, Porto Alegre, Brazil.
1998	Artecom 98, Exposición Colectiva, Instituto Cultural Paraguayo Alemán. Medina/Toranzos, Galería Scappini-Lamarca. Asunción. Paraguay.
1999	Gabriela Zuccolillo y Félix Toranzos, Verónica Torres, Colección de Arte. Collective Exhibition, Galería Fábrica. Asunción. Paraguay. Exposición 10 Años de Pequeña Galería. Asunción. Paraguay. Ordiñana, Miranda y Toranzos, Galería Multiarte. Asunción. Paraguay.
2000	"El Ultimo Decenio", Exposición Colectiva, Museo de Arte Contemporáneo de Montevideo, Uruguay. "Obra Sobre Papel, en el arte contemporáneo paraguayo", Washington D.C., USA. "El Sacrificio", Arte Colonial, Independiente y Actual, Centro de Artes Visuales/Museo del Barro. Asunción. Paraguay. "Caminos de la línea", Embajada del Brasil. Asunción. Paraguay.
2001	"El Ultimo Decenio", Collective Exhibition, Centro de Artes Visuales/ Museo del Barro. Asunción. Paraguay.
2002	"La resistencia de la pintura", Exposición Colectiva, Galería Fabrica. "Los Argumentos", Sala de exposiciones del Centro Cultural de España, Juan de Salazar. Asunción. Paraguay.
2004	Exposición de Pinturas Fundación Aerolíneas Argentinas, Buenos Aires, Argentina.
2005	Collective Exhibition, Arte Actual Galería de Arte. Asunción. Paraguay.
2012	"Flora" Galería Matices. Asunción. Paraguay.
2014	"Acanto" Galería Matices. Asunción. Paraguay.
2016	"Los Rostros de María" Galería Matices. Asunción. Paraguay.
2023	"La línea que sostiene el vacío" Galería Matices. Asunción. Paraguay.
2023	"El viaje de Teseo" ASU Pinta Sud. Asunción. Paraguay
2024	"Esperando al río" Galería Exaedro. Asunción. Paraguay.

== Awards and honors ==
Year	Main Activities
1998	Prize "Pedro Agüero". Edición 1998, Asunción, Paraguay.
2003	First Place in the Contest “Expressión Fuschia”

== Style ==
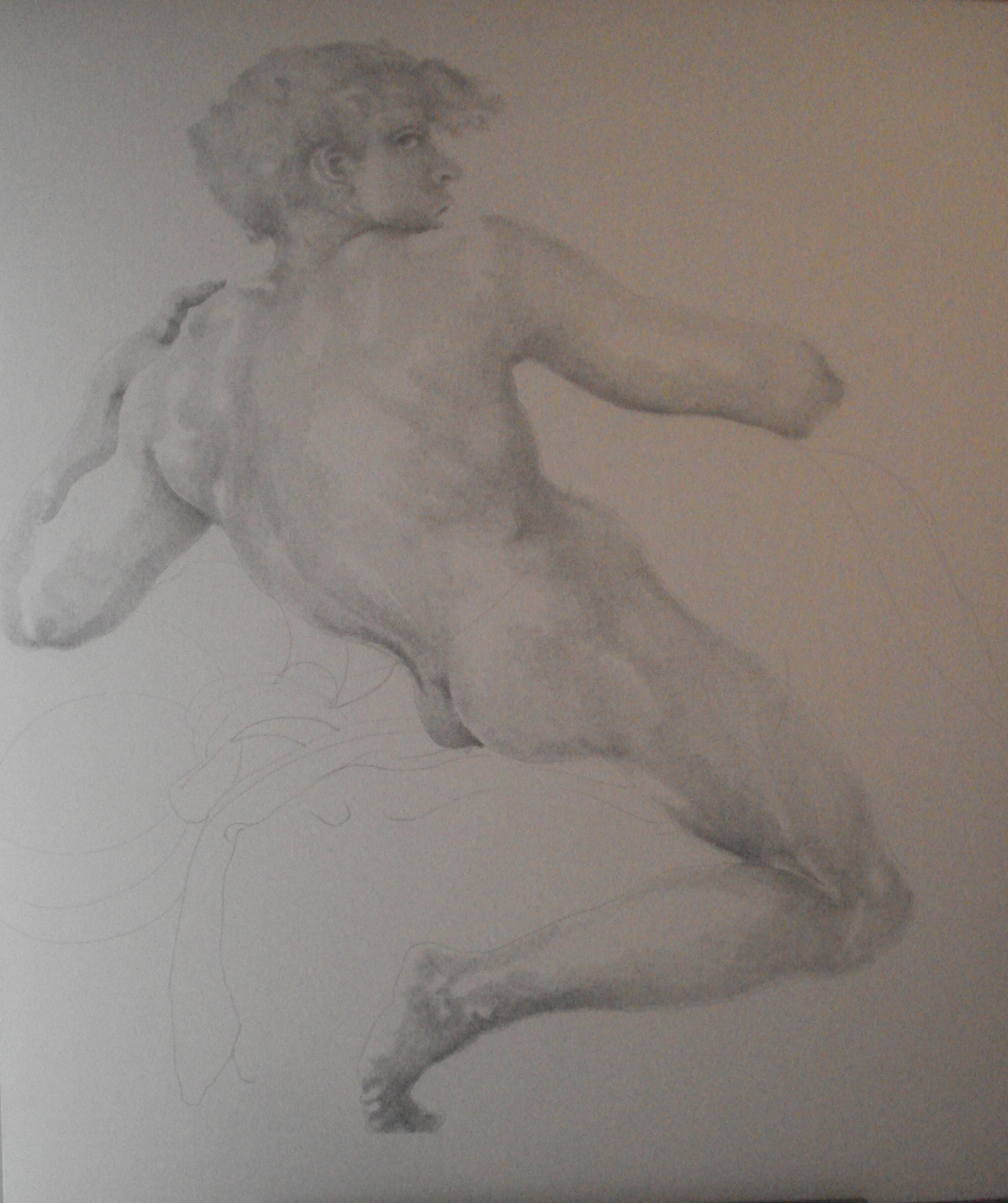

In his more than thirty years of artistic production, he has become a joiner of painting, engraving, and other facilities, using different mediums ranging from the simple canvas up tolarge racks of plaster, marked by combinations of painting and engraving. His assemblages are creations of three-dimensional pieces with knots and tensions that are interwoven in the area. His style is marked by an combination of colors and textures.

His architectural studies have served as a liaison for the expressive use of space, making works in a perfect harmony between the rigidity of the geometry and the lightness of metaphorical poetry. His drawings contain an exquisite balance between the schematic and the ethereal. On occasion, he has been inspired by works of the Renaissance period, introducing a series of works dedicated to the great masters like Michelangelo, Leonardo da Vinci and Raphael.

== Family ==
Felix's father, Don Luis Toranzos, having been a widower with two daughters, Candida Maria and the other, Angelina Rosalie, married in second marriage with Angelina Miers. His children are Haydée Rafaela, Dario Luis Augusto Bardel and Felix, the oldest son. His family lives in Asunción.
