= University of Garden City =

University in Sudan

Coordinates: 15.5903°N 32.5717°E

The University of Garden City is a university in the Sudanese capital Khartoum, established in 2003 (22 years ago).

== History ==
The university was established by a government Act in 2003 (amendment 2008) as a private and not-for-profit higher education institution in Garden City, Khartoum, Sudan. It was approved as a university by the Ministry Of Higher Education.

== Courses ==
The University offers four-year bachelor's degrees in business administration, communication science, mass communication, and information technology.

It offers five-year bachelor's degrees in architecture, civil engineering, biomedical engineering, electronics engineering, nursing, medicine, laboratory, and a two-year master's degree in business administration.
