= Computer-aided quality assurance =

Computer-aided quality assurance (CAQ) is the engineering application of computers and computer-controlled machines for the planning and implementation of the quality of products.

This includes:

- Measuring equipment management
- Goods inward inspection
- Vendor rating
- Attribute chart
- Statistical process control (SPC)
- Documentation

Additional themes:

- Advanced Product Quality Planning (APQP)
- Failure mode and effects analysis (FMEA)
- Dimensional tolerance stack-up analysis using product and manufacturing information (PMI) on CAD models
- Computer aided inspection with coordinate-measuring machines (CMM)
- Comparison of data obtained by mean of 3D scanning technologies of physical parts against CAD models
