= Lycée La Condamine =

Location
- Calle Japón Y Naciones Unidas; Quito, Pichincha; Ecuador
- Coordinates: 0.1724°S 78.4827°W

Information
- Type: Private school, French lycée
- Website: condamine.co

Lycée franco-équatorien La Condamine is a French international school in Quito, Ecuador. It has programmes from the primary level until the terminale, the final year of lycée (senior high school or lyceum). It is part of the network of the Agency for French Education Abroad.
