= Asunción Escalada National Highschool =

Coordinates: 25°16′59″S 57°37′56″W

National School of DME Asunción Escalada
- Colegio Nacional de EMD Asunción Escalada
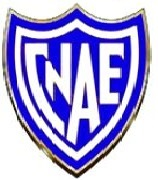

Location
- 248 Iturbe Street; Asunción; Paraguay

Information
- Type: National Secondary School
- Motto: "75 Years Honoring Education"
- Established: February 10, 1938
- Principal: Mg. Nilda Zárate Pereira
- Gender: Mixed
- Nickname: CNAE
- Website: www.cnae.edu.py

The National Highschool of DME "Asunción Escalada" (commonly called by the acronym CNAE) (and formerly known as the National Girls School) is a traditional secondary school, located in the city of Asunción, Paraguay. It was created by Decree on February 10, 1938, as one of the few educational institutions at that time in charge of education exclusively for girls.

It kept its gender distinction until 2004, when by resolution of the Minister of Education, the school became co-educational.

There are currently over 1000 students enrolled in the school, with primary and secondary education levels, with three types of baccalaureates in the sciences, and four for technical subjects.

The school made a considerable advance in educational opportunities in 2008, through enabling the Technical Baccalaureate in Industrial Chemistry, making it one of only five schools to offer the course in the Metropolitan Area.

In 2012, the institution was in charge of organizing the ESI-AMLAT science fair, which attracts young Scientists from around the world to Paraguay in order to share their knowledge in different branches of science .

== History ==
On February 10, 1938, the Paraguayan government promulgated the decree No. 4,369, which created the "National Girls High School". The decree was signed by then President Dr. Félix Paiva.

Regarding the establishment of a new high school for girls, in one section the decree, he stated: "That the demands of modern society, [and] the progress of industrial civilization guided by new economic conditions... [make it] essential to facilitate women the means to not be defeated in the struggle for the life that she chooses with the same tenacity that men do... "

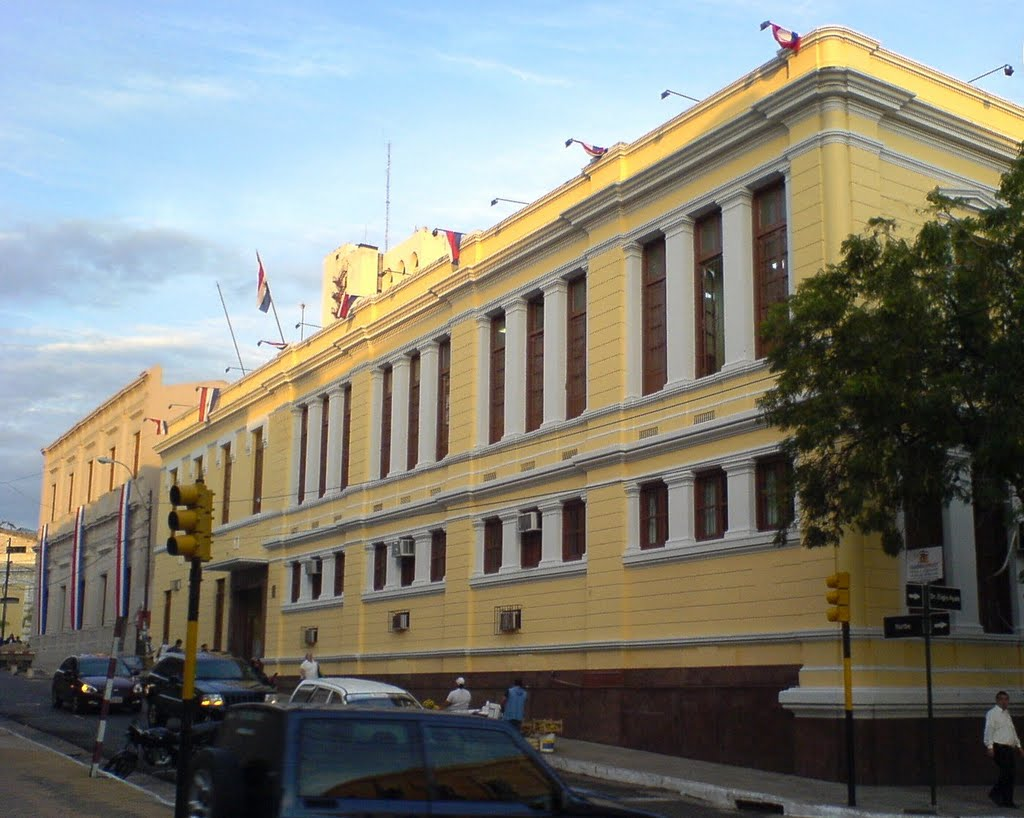
Edificio del Colegio Asunción Escalada

== Co-educational High School ==
On February 9, 2004, after 66 years of teaching exclusively to the female population, resolution No. 43, allowed once again for the registration of boys in the school.

This decision was contentious, with some parents applauding the integration, but with a number of parents repudiating the action and withdrawing their daughters from the school.

== Location ==
The National Girls High School originally opened in the building located at the intersection of streets Iturbe and Fulgencio R. Moreno. It was located here from 1938 to 1952, until it moved to the current location at Iturbe and Eligio Ayala streets, in the building of the Colegio Nacional de la Capital.

On February 17, 1992, Dr. Horacio Galeano Perrone, said the National Girls High School are the only owners of its current site. In the grounds of the school is a multipurpose room named "Emilio Biggi" domain, which has long been in dispute between the Institution and the Ministry of Education.

== Anthem ==
On the initiative of the first principal of the institution, Professor Wil Carísimo Avalos created the Anthem of the school. The original lyrics was written by the "Poet of the City" Mr. Francisco Ortiz Méndez, with the music belonging to the famous composer Mr. Remberto Giménez.

The anthem has not been officially used since 2004, as the lyrics letter make reference only to the education of women.

== Present Day ==
The school currently has a significant number of students attending both morning and afternoon classes.

The Baccalaureates available are: Science with emphasis in Basic Sciences, Social Sciences and Arts and Letters, and Business Administration techniques, Accounting, Computer Science and Industrial Chemistry.

== Uniform ==
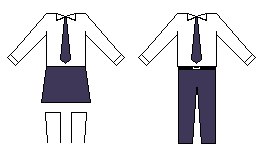
Uniforme de la institución.

The school uniform is obligatory for all students. The boys uniform is composed of dark blue pants, a white shirt and dark blue tie; the girls use a dark blue skirt, white shirt, dark blue tie and white stockings.

Typically, students are allowed to wear shirts with the design of the Sports and Cultural Fair, which is held each year, with a team whose colors represent the same. These are: red, yellow, blue, gray, white, turquoise, black, green and violet.

== Principals List ==
#	Name and Lastname	Lapse
1	Wil Carísimo de Ávalos	1938-1941
2	Lidia Velázquez	1941-1944
3	Concepción Rojas	1945-1946
4	Edelmira Gonález de Almeida	1946-1982
5	Nancy Riquelme de Pistilli	1983-1985
6	Etelvina Miranda de Alvarenga	1985-1993
7	Odila Pereira de Cazenave	1994-1999
8	Margarita Paniagua	2000-2002
9	Anatalia Coronel de Vuyk	2002-2008
10	Graciela Aquino de Bento	2008-2009
11	Ada Luz Paredes Insfrán	2009-2010
12	Carmen María Jiménez Céspedes	2010-2011
13	Nilda Beatriz Zárate Pereira	2011–present day.

== Sport and scientific Activities ==
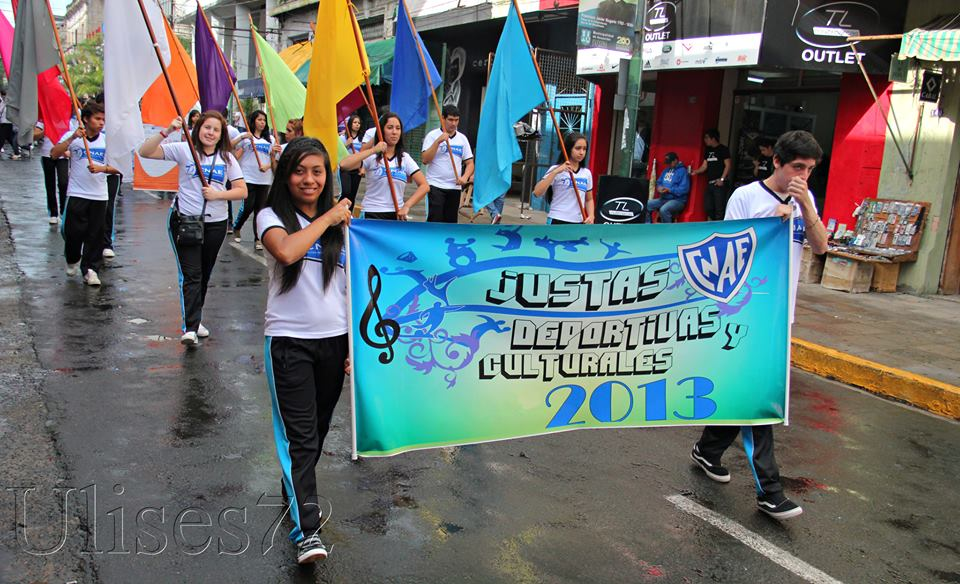
Apertura de las Justas Deportivas CNAE 2013

The CNAE performs several activities that promote sport, and science fairs that attract the attention of all students.

- Sports and Cultural Fair: Students and professors form teams represented with a color (red, yellow, blue, gray, white, turquoise, black, green or purple) among several competing courses with categories such as football (soccer), volleyball, basketball, handball, athletics, swimming, cycling, chess, Fair of Knowledge, safari, etc. It highlights the issue of 2013 for having captured the interest of teachers and students alike, as well as the high turnout.
- Expoferia: It is usually performed at the end of each school year. Students specialties Computing and Industrial Chemistry exhibit their progress in science and technology projects respectively.
- Ciencap: exhibition where several science/technology-related projects done by students are presented.
- Gymnastics Show: activity that was popular years ago, but lately has been left out due to time constraints.
