= List of schools in Guinea =

This is a list of notable schools in the African country of Guinea.

== Primary and secondary schools ==
- American International School of Conakry, Conakry
- Lycée français Albert Camus, Conakry; French school
- The English Speaking Community School of Guinea, Conakry; Bilingual School
- Ecole Maternelle and Primaire Bilingue Hope Horizons
- Christ the Redeemer's Academy "Beginners, Primary and Secondary" School

== See also ==
- Education in Guinea
- Lists of schools
