= German School of Guayaquil =

German School Guayaquil
- Spanish: Colegio Alemán Humboldt Guayaquil; German: Deutsche Schule Guayaquil
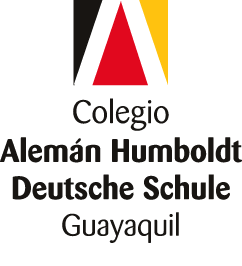

Location
- Los Ceibos, Calle Dr. Héctor Romero 216; Guayaquil, Guayas; Ecuador; 2°10′01″S 79°56′37″W

Information
- Type: Private
- Established: 1957; 69 years ago
- Founder: Renate Lemke
- Principal: Andreas Herzog
- Grades: Kindergarten and K-12
- Gender: Coeducational
- Age range: 3 to 18
- Average class size: 18-22
- Language: Spanish, German, and English
- Hours in school day: 5, 6, 7 and 10 depending on the grade
- Campus type: Urban
- Athletics: Yes
- Sports: Swimming, athletics, volleyball
- Rival: Deutsche Schule Quito
- Newspaper: El IguanaDiario
- Affiliation: International Baccalaureate Organization
- Website: alemanhumboldt.edu.ec/guayaquil/

The German School of Guayaquil (Spanish: Colegio Alemán Humboldt Guayaquil, German: Deutsche Schule Guayaquil) is a multilingual school in Guayaquil, Ecuador. It was founded in 1957 by Renate Lemke to meet the necessities of the German immigrants in the city.

It is one of 117 German schools abroad and one of the three German schools in Ecuador. It belongs to the International Baccalaureate Organization and offers the Diploma Program.

== History ==
The school was officially founded in 1959 by Richard Zeller and Claus Riemann, German immigrants who resided in Guayaquil. However, the school's history goes back to 1957 when Renate Lemke, a kindergarten teacher opened a day care for the children of German immigrants in her own home. By the end of the school year, she continued with an elementary school in another building, because the number of students had increased. In 1958 the school moved to the newly inaugurated neighbourhood Urdesa. By then, the German School as it was known, had already a second grade.

In 1960 Federal Republic of Germany began to cooperate with the school and sent the first teachers abroad, then the school had a full elementary school. The same year, Renate Lemke served for the last time as headmaster.

By 1964 the campus in Urdesa was already too small for a growing school. The German School already had a full High School and that year the Kindergarten moved to Los Ceibos, again a new neighbourhood in expansion. Nevertheless, it was only possible to move completely in 1968 when Germany sent the money for the construction of the elementary school and the high school.

On April 13, 2009, the school inaugurated a second Kindergarten in Samborondón. The project involves first the Kindergarten "Kinderkosmos" and eventually the final relocation of the elementary school. The high school (5 to 12 grade) will remain in Los Ceibos.

== School terms ==
There are two academic halves in the year,

- The first half, from early April to late August. New children are only admitted in the first half, except when there are mitigating factors like coming from a city with other school terms.
- The second half, from mid September to late December or mid January. This half's end varies from year to year. Sometimes it ends before Christmas, sometimes there are two weeks Christmas holidays and then two to three weeks school in January. Mostly it depends on the rain season, which takes place in the big vacations (from December to March) and determines if the first term begins in early or mid April.

== Uniform ==
Like all of Ecuadorian schools, the German School has a uniform for its pupils. At the beginning, a uniform was not mandatory because in Germany schools do not have a uniform, but already in the 1960s this ended and the traditional uniform has been worn since then.

The school's open-minded direction has, contrary to Guayaquil's society, always permitted long or dyed hair, piercings and facial hair for the boys, nail polish and earrings for the girls and the length of the skirts can vary through the years.

The boys' uniform is gray trousers or blue jeans, and a white Polo shirt with the school's logo. Girls can wear a gray checkered skirt or jeans (Blue or Grey) and the same polo shirt as boys. For both white socks are mandatory, both can also wear any colored shoes. The school's sweater is also Wine with the school logo and is one of the sweaters to allowed to be worn with the uniform, with exceptions being 12th Grade commemoratory sweaters, exchange sweaters and a white windbreaker.

For sport, both girls and boys can wear black shorts with white T-shirts with the school logo and white trainers. There is also the possibility to wear the school's black sport trousers and sport sweater as part of the sport uniform if it is a cold morning.

Kindergarten boys wear gray shorts and girls a checkered gray jumper dress.

== School magazine ==
The Genau! was the first official school magazine. It was founded in 1986. The magazine was relaunched in 2005. Although it has an editorial board formed by high school students, collaboration from all grades is usual and encouraged. developed by students. The Blog has a broader article spectrum and covers not only school subjects but many politics, arts and subjects of common concern as well. Nowadays it is called El IguanaDiario, and it can be chosen by 11th Grade Pupils as their CAS Project.

The school is a member of the Trait d'Union, an international online multimedia magazine. Students participate with articles written in German.

== Curriculum ==
The German School is known for humanities and natural and exact sciences. The school offers a special program of the International Baccalaureate Organization, called Gemischtsprachiges Internationale Baccalaureate i.e. a multilingual program in German, English and Spanish specially designed to be compatible with the German Abitur.

The school maintains a Kindergarten for children aged three to five, an elementary school for pupils aged six to 10 and a high school with a total of 2000 students. A second Kindergarten is planned to open in the suburb Samborondón in April 2009.

The pupil to teacher ratio is an average of 15:1 from Kindergarten to 12th grade, which is low by general and Ecuadorian school standards. Class sizes start at around twenty in the elementary school and Kindergarten (classes have 2 teachers) and are often around 15 by the final years.

The school runs a psychological department whose job is to counsel high school students about its college choice and majors. Students are encouraged to study abroad. Approximately one third of the high school graduates choose to study in Germany.

=== Arts and music ===
Arts and music play an important role in the school's curriculum. There are special music and arts classes with all materials needed to learn. The school's walls have served as canvas for the pupils. The elementary school organizes an "Open Air Art Day" every year where children paint outside and parents and family are welcomed to observe. Many artistic projects are held every year and art and music are mandatory until the 10th grade, when students may choose to pursue music as one of their two optional subjects (Materias ELOB). This is also possible for art

Students can learn to play instruments. The small ones begin with a recorder and a xylophone and is possible to learn the piano, among others, as an elective. There are school choirs for the kindergarten, elementary and high school and a rock band who has won the only school bands competition in the country.

=== Sports ===
The school has its own swimming pool, athletics field, soccer, volleyball and basketball courts and a gym. In kindergarten children are taught to swim. Elementary school pupils have mandatory swimming and sport classes twice a week, while in high school only sport is mandatory and swimming an elective.

In the afternoon the students can do sports.

The Bundesjugendspiele (Federal Youth Sport Games) are held internally as in every school in Germany and pupils have the chance to get a diploma from the German President for their accomplishments.

Sports play an important role at the German School and because of that the students participate every two years in the South American German schools Competition called "Humboldt Spiele" and, as a preparation to it, in the annual swimming-volleyball-athletics competition against the German School of Quito. The school participates in national and regional youth competitions as well and has already won national titles in sport.

=== Languages ===
Children receive German language classes from second grade on, but even in Kindergarten the language is used in games. English remains the second foreign language and its teaching begins in the third grade.

Various subjects are taught in German at the high school depending on the teachers ability. Maths, Biology, Art, Physics and History are always taught in German depending on the grade.

An English Language Project Week is organized every year by elementary school pupils of all grades who explain their projects at the end of the week. There is also a Spelling Bee Contest and a Short-Story Contest.

At the end of the 12 class, students are Bachiller de la República del Ecuador i.e. have an Ecuadorian high school diploma that allows them to continue their education in a university. Depending on the electives taken, pupils may obtain the International Baccalaureate Diploma or a German Diploma that allows them to enter a German University of Applied Sciences.

=== Exchange programs ===
- At the end of the ninth grade, the whole class goes to Germany for 6 weeks. For four weeks the children live with a host family and attend a German Gymnasium. During the last two weeks they travel with their accompanying school teachers and the rest of the class through Germany.

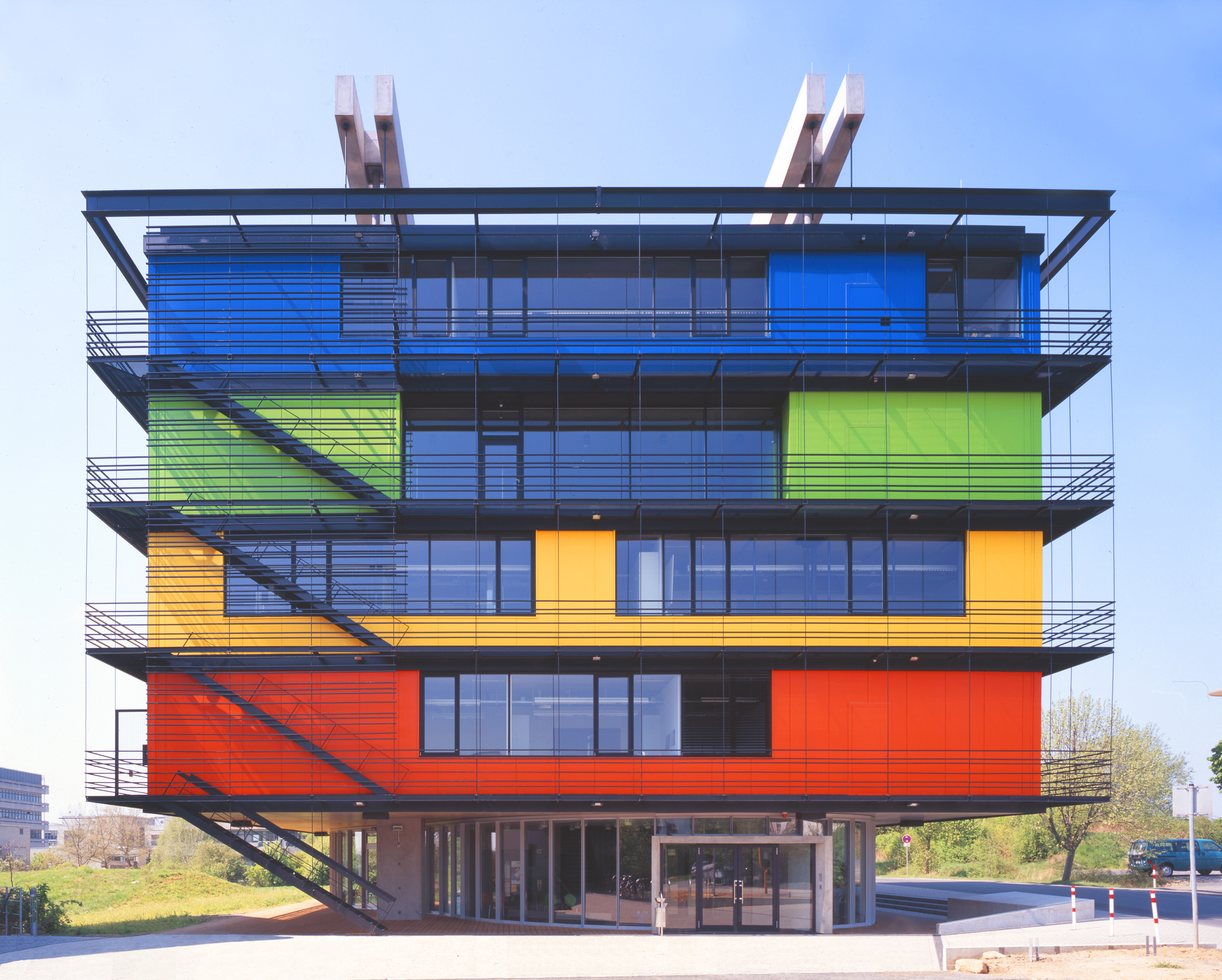
The Science Camp premises at the University of Göttingen

- By the end of the 11th grade, there is the possibility to attend four weeks mandatory internship in Germany or any DACH member country. The school can help the students to find a suitable institution or firm.
- The Pedagogical Exchange Service (Pädagogischer Austauschdienst), an institution of the German Government, awards excellent students with a trip to Germany together with other pupils of German schools around the world. The scholarship consist of a four-week cultural journey, all expenses paid, to Germany. The German School of Guayaquil had the privilege to choose among its 11 graders one student for this award.
- There is a sport exchange program with the Sportgymnasium of Leipzig and the sport specialized Poelchau-Oberschule in Berlin.
- The University of Göttingen, the German Aerospace Center and the Max Planck Institute for Biophysical Chemistry organize a three weeks science exchange program called Science Camp for 12 graders around the world. Every year a pupil of the German School of Guayaquil is awarded with a scholarship to the science camp and receives there applied physics, neurophysiology, Immunology classes, among other natural sciences.

== Traditions ==
One of the more cherished traditions is the "Laternen Fest" during the three Kindergarten years. "Laternen Fest" is a German tradition in remembrance of Martin of Tours. The students prepare their own paper lantern and participate in a school procession on St. Martin's Day where they light the lanterns and sing German songs.

The "Día de campo" (country day) is a mix of children-Oktoberfest and school fest. The "country day" is held in the school on the last Sunday of October and is organized by the parents council. For every child, one adult has to participate, selling either food, watching for the children on the rides, selling ice cream or other activities. On the "Día de campo" German, Ecuadorian and other European countries food are offered, games, rides, sports, plays are held and, above all, the fireworks.

== Charitable work ==
The German School of Guayaquil has a charity tradition. The main program, run since the 1960s, is afternoon school for children from low-income families. Morning pupils of the 11th grade must complete a mandatory social work year at the afternoon school, called CAS Projects, which is mandatory according to the International Baccalaureate Organization, this project is graded and it represents a part of the final graduation grade. They usually work as Kindergarten teachers, sport, arts and computing teachers, or help the children with learning difficulties. Over 200 children attend the afternoon Kindergarten, elementary and high school.

The school also supports a food program, where students research and teach about the benefits of soy.

The third charitable program is run in cooperation with the Bielefeld University and its aim is to help in the development of Daular, a town in the province Guayas. Together, they organize social development programs such as a water plant, electricity, a fish pool and a conservatory for self-sustainability and the construction of a school. Pupils, students and villagers work together in order to achieve the year's goal. The project won in 2006/2007 an award from the United Nations for its unique international concept.
