= Colegio Intisana =

School in Quito, Ecuador

Colegio Intisana was established in Quito, Ecuador, on October 26, 1966. The school is dependent on the International Foundation for Educative and Social Foundation (FINDES). It holds legal approval to operate grades between 1st and 12th. By Ministerial agreements 3371, signed April 14, 1986, and renewed on May 28, 1992, the school a character for an Bilingual Experimental Educative Unit and counts on autonomy pedagogical, administrative, organizational, and technical.

Since 1986, the school has been offering the International Baccalaureate Diploma Programme. The school's policy is to not discriminate against race, religion, social status, nor for any other reason, nevertheless, it is a boys only school since its foundation.
