= International French School of Kampala =

School in Kampala, Uganda

Coordinates: 0.3291°N 32.6035°E

Great Lakes French School
- French: École Française Les Grands Lacs
- Kampala; Uganda

Information
- School type: International School
- Language: French

International French School of Kampala (French: École Française Internationale de Kampala, EFIK), formerly École Française Les Grands Lacs (Great Lakes French School), is a French international school in Kampala, Uganda. It directly teaches until Troisième and then uses the National Centre for Distance Education (CNED) distance education programme for subsequent years until terminale (final year of lycée or upper secondary education).
