= École Française Internationale de Khartoum =

Location
- Garden City, Khartoum; Sudan

Information
- School type: International School
- Established: 1980; 45 years ago
- Language: French

École Française Internationale de Khartoum (EFIK) is a French international school in Garden City, Khartoum, Sudan. The school was established in 1980 as the École Française de Khartoum and received its current name in 2014. It serves from preschool through the third-to-last year of education. As of 2015 it has not yet established its lycée (senior high school) programme.
