= K–12 education =

Kindergarten to 12th grade

K–12 (Note: Spoken as "k twelve", "k to twelve", or "k through twelve") (from kindergarten to twelfth grade) is an English language expression that indicates the range of years of publicly supported primary and secondary education found in the United States and Canada, which is similar to publicly supported school grades before tertiary education in several other countries, such as Armenia, Australia, China, Ecuador, Egypt, India, Iran, the Philippines, South Korea, and Turkey. K–12 refers to the American system, which affords authority to local intersectional "districts," which may be specific to a municipality, county, or several regions, depending on population and proximity.

== History ==
=== United States ===
U.S. public education was conceived in the late 18th century. In 1790, Pennsylvania became the first state to require some form of free education for everyone, regardless of whether they could afford it. New York passed similar legislation in 1805. In 1820, Massachusetts became the first state to create a tuition-free high school, Boston English.

The first K–12 public school systems appeared in the early 19th century. In the 1830s and 1840s, Ohioans were taking a significant interest in the idea of public education. At that time, schools were commonly operated independently of each other, with little attempt at uniformity. The Akron School Law of 1847 changed this. The city of Akron unified the operations, curriculum, and funding of local schools into a single public school district:

Under the Akron School Law, there was to be one school district encompassing the entire city. Within that district would be a number of elementary schools, with students divided into separate "grades" based on achievement. When enough demand existed, the school board would establish a high school as well. Property taxes would pay for the new school system. A school board, elected by the community, would make decisions about the system's management and hire the necessary professionals to run each school. Illustrating the racism that existed in Ohio during this era, the Akron School Law excluded African-American children from the public school system.

In 1849, the state of Ohio enacted a law, modeled after the Akron law which extended the idea of school districts to cover the rest of the state.

By 1930, all 48 states had passed laws making education compulsory, and in 1965, President Lyndon B. Johnson signed the Elementary and Secondary Education Act (ESEA), which committed the federal government to significant ongoing expenditures to each state for the purpose of sustaining local K–12 school systems. The ESEA essentially made K–12 education the law of the land.

Since its inception, public K–12 education has been debated and subject to several waves of reform throughout the 20th and 21st centuries. In the 1980s, Reagan's "A Nation at Risk" initiative included provisions requiring public education to be evaluated based on standards, and teacher pay to be based on evaluations. In the 1990s, the Goals 2000 Act and the "Improving America's Schools" Act provided additional federal funding to states to bolster local K–12 systems. This was followed in the 2000s by a rigorous uptick in standards-based evaluations with the No Child Left Behind Act in 2001 and the Race to the Top in 2009. In 2015, President Barack Obama signed the Every Student Succeeds Act (ESSA), which returned some power to state governments with respect to evaluations and standards.

=== Australia ===
In Australia, P–12 is sometimes used in place of K–12, particularly in Queensland, where it is used as an official term in the curriculum framework. P–12 schools serve children for the thirteen years from prep until Year 12, without including the separate kindergarten component.

=== Canada ===
In Canada (Nova Scotia), P–12 is commonly used in place of K–12 and serves students from grade Primary through 12.

=== Philippines ===
K–12 implementation in the Philippines started on May 20, 2008, during the administration of President Gloria Macapagal Arroyo with the filing of Omnibus Education Reform Act of 2008 by Mar Roxas, and further emphasized by the 2008 ASEAN Charter on December 15, 2008. As part of the 9-year process of the new curriculum, Kindergarten became mandatory on June 6, 2011, during the presidency of Arroyo's successor Benigno Aquino III, as a requirement for the effectivity of K–12 and the phasing out the 1945–2017 K–4th Year system on April 24 of the following year. The new curriculum then became effective on the said date of April 2012, starting with School Year (SY) 2012–2013. To maintain K–12's continuity, the Kindergarten Education Act of 2012 and Enhanced Basic Education Act of 2013 (Republic Act Nos. 10157 and 10533) were signed into law by President Benigno Aquino III on January 20, 2012 and May 15, 2013, respectively. The K–12 process spanned for 9 years and three Philippine presidents from Arroyo in May 2008 until K–4th Year was entirely phased out during the administration of Rodrigo Duterte on June 5, 2017. It aimed to align the Philippine education system with international standards and better prepare students for employment, entrepreneurship, or higher education.

The first cohort to complete the full 2008–2017 K–12 implementation and K–4th Year phase-out process graduated from senior high school in 2018.

In 2023, the K–10 Matatag curriculum was revised and piloted in 35 schools. In 2025, the SHS curriculum was revised and piloted in over 800 schools. Core subjects were reduced from 15 to 5, work-immersion hours were nearly doubled (from 340 to 640), and there was a stronger emphasis on practical and employability skills.

== Etymology ==
"The structure of education in the United States"

The expression "K–12" is a shortening of kindergarten (K) for 5–6 year–olds through twelfth grade (12) for 17–18year–olds, as the first and last grades, respectively, of free education in these countries. The related term "P–12" is also occasionally used in Australia and the United States to refer to the sum of K–12 plus preschool education.

The accompanying image illustrates the education system, in the United States. The table shows the progression of the education system starting with the basic K–12 system then progressing through post-secondary education. K–14 refers to K–12 plus two years of post-secondary where training is received from vocational-technical institutions or community or junior colleges. K–16 is 12 years of compulsory education plus a 4-year undergraduate program. The K numbers refer to the years of educational attainment and continue to progress upward accordingly, depending on the degree being sought.

== Usage ==
The term is often used as a kind of shorthand to collectively refer to the entirety of primary and secondary education, as it is much easier than having to say one is referring in the aggregate to elementary, middle, and high school education. However, it is rare for a school district to actually teach all K–12 grades at one unified school campus. Even the smallest school districts try to maintain, at a minimum, a two-tier distinction between an elementary school (K–8) and a high school (9–12). Unified K–12 schools are common, however, in rural and remote areas throughout Canada. The terms "PK–12", "PreK–12", or "Pre-K–12" are sometimes used to add pre-kindergarten.

In school website URLs, the term also appears in the form "k12" (no punctuation), generally used before the country code top-level domain (or in the United States, the state's second-level domain).

== K–14, K–16, K–18 and K–20 ==
K–14 education also includes community colleges (the first two years of university). K–16 education adds a four-year undergraduate university degree. For simplicity, education shorthand was created to denote specific education levels of achievement. This shorthand is commonly used in articles, publications and educational legislation. The following list contains the most commonly found shorthand descriptors:

- P–14: Pre-school to associate degree
- P–16: Pre-school to bachelor's degree
- P–18: Pre-school to master's degree
- P–20: Pre-school to graduate degree
- K–14: Kindergarten to associate degree
- K–16: Kindergarten to bachelor's degree
- K–18: Kindergarten to master's degree
- K–20: Kindergarten to graduate degree

The Career Technical Education (CTE) Unit of the California Community College Economic Development and Workforce Preparation Division focuses on program coordination and advocacy, policy development and coordination with K–18 workforce preparation and career and technical education systems.

The ASCCC Chancellor's Office Career Technical Education (CTE) Unit of the Economic Development and Workforce Preparation Division focuses on program coordination and advocacy, policy development and coordination with K–18 workforce preparation and career and technical education systems. Responsible for the implementation of the Vocational and Technical Education Act (VTEA), managing and coordinating activities that impact other interagency and intra-agency objectives. In addition, the CTE Unit is also responsible for the development, dissemination, and implementation of the California State Plan and the annual performance reports.

Further reference to K–18 education can be found in this publication by Ann Diver-Stamnes and Linda Catelli in chapter 4 "College/University Partnership Projects for Instituting Change and Improvement in K–18 Education".

== See also ==
- All-through school
- Day care
- K–12 education in the United States
