= List of schools in Saint Lucia =

There are 73 primary schools and 26 secondary schools in Saint Lucia. Sir Arthur Lewis Community College caters to students preparing for Cambridge post-secondary examinations.

All but three of the secondary schools in Saint Lucia are run by the Government of Saint Lucia through the Ministry of Education. St. Joseph's Convent and St. Mary's college are jointly run by the Ministry of Education and the Catholic Board of Education. The Seventh Day Adventist Academy is run by the Seventh Day Adventist Church. The International School St. Lucia is affiliated with Canada (New Brunswick and Ontario), The Montessori Centre St Lucia and Bonne Terre Preparatory School are privately run.

All but three of Saint Lucia's secondary schools are co-ed. St. Joseph's Convent is an all girls school. St. Mary's College is an all boys school. The Girl's Vocational School is an all girls school. Ave Maria Primary and RC Boy's primary are the all girls and all boys primary schools respectively.

Saint Lucia's first secondary school, St. Joseph's Convent, was founded by the Sisters of St. Joseph of Cluny in 1854.

The University of The West Indies offers a Challenge programme in Saint Lucia, administered at the campus of Sir Arthur Lewis Community College. Monroe University operates a campus in Saint Lucia.

There are three medical schools in Saint Lucia – American International Medical University, International American University, and Spartan Health Sciences University School of Medicine.

== Schools ==
=== Tertiary ===
- University of the West Indies
- Monroe University
- Sir Arthur Lewis Community College
- American International Medical University
- International American University College of Medicine
- Spartan Health Sciences University School of Medicine
- University of the Southern Caribbean Saint Lucia Branch

=== Secondary ===
- Anse Ger Secondary School, Micoud
- Babonneau Secondary School, Babonneau
- Bocage Secondary School, Bocage, Castries
- Beanfield Comprehensive Secondary School, Vieux Fort
- Bonne Terre Preparatory School
- Castries Comprehensive Secondary School, Vide Boutielle, Castries
- Choiseul Secondary School, La Fargue, Choiseul
- Ciceron Secondary School, Ciceron, Castries
- Clendon Mason Memorial Secondary School, Dennery
- Corinth Secondary School, Corinth, Gros Islet
- Entrepot Secondary School, Castries
- George Charles Secondary School, Cul de Sac, Castries
- Grande Riviere Secondary School, Grande Riviere, Dennery
- Gros Islet Secondary School, Beausejour, Gros Islet
- International School St. Lucia (private, Canadian), Rodney Heights, Gros Islet
- Jon Odlum Secondary School (formerly Marigot Secondary School), Marigot, Castries
- Leon Hess Comprehensive Secondary School, Entrepot, Castries
- Micoud Secondary School, Micoud
- Piaye Secondary School, Piaye, Laborie
- Saint Lucia Seventh Day Adventist Academy, Sunny Acres, Castries
- St. Joseph's Convent, Cedars, Castries
- St. Mary's College, Vigie, Castries
- Sir Ira Simmons Secondary School, Vide Boutielle, Castries
- Soufriere Comprehensive Secondary School, Soufriere
- Vide Bouteille Secondary School, La Clery, Castries
- Vieux Fort Comprehensive Secondary School, Vieux Fort
- Entrepot Secondary School, Entrepot, Castries

=== Primary ===
- Anse La Raye Infant & Primary School, Anse La Raye
- Augier Combined School, Augier, Vieux-Fort
- Aux Leon Combined, Aux Leon, Dennery
- Ave Maria Primary School, Broglie St., Castries
- Babonneau Primary School, Babonneau
- Balata Primary School, Balata, Babonneau
- Banse La Grace Combined, Laborie
- Belle Vue Combined, Belle Vue, Vieux-Fort
- Bexon R.C. Infant & Primary School, Bexon, Castries
- Blanchard Combined School, Blanchard, Micoud
- Bouton Primary School, Bouton, Soufriere
- Bocage Combined School, Bocage, Castries
- Boguis Primary School, Boguis, Babonneau
- Canaries Infant School, Canaries
- Canaries Primary School, Canaries
- Camille Henry Memorial School, L'anse Road, Castries
- Canon Laurie Anglican Infant & Primary Schools, Trinity Church Road, Castries
- Carmen Rene Memorial School, Sans Souci, Castries
- Ciceron R.C. Combined School, Ciceron, Castries
- Dame Pearlette Louisy Primary School, Union, Gros Islet
- Delcer R.C. Combined School, Delcer, Choiseul
- Deniere Riviere Combined School, Derniere Riviere, Dennery
- Dennery Infant School, Dennery
- Desruisseaux Combined School, Desruisseaux, Micoud
- Dugard Combined School, Dugard, Choiseul
- Des Barras Combined School, Des Barras, Babonneau
- Emmanuel Seventh-day Adventist Combined School, Mon-Repos, Micoud
- Eucharist Lewis Seventh-day Adventist Primary School, Sunny Acres, Castries
- Fond Assau Primary School, Fond Assau, Babonneau
- Gordon and Walcott Memorial Methodist School, Darling Road, Castries
- Grace Combined, Grace, Vieux-Fort
- Grande-Riviere Primary School, Grande-Riviere, Gros Islet
- Gros Islet Primary School, Gros Islet
- International School St. Lucia (private), Rodney Heights, Gros Islet
- La Croix Maingot Primary School, La Croix Maingot, Castries
- La Guerre Primary School, La Guerre, Babonnneau
- La Ressource Combined, La Ressource, Dennery
- Laborie Girls & Boys Primary, Laborie
- L'Abayee Seventh-day Adventist Primary School, L'Abayee Castries
- Les Etangs Combined School, Soufriere
- Millet R.C. Infant & Primary School, Millet
- Monchy Combined School, Monchy, Gros Islet
- Mongouge Combined School, Ponyon, Choiseul
- Mon-Repos Combined, Mon-Repos, Micoud
- The Montessori Centre, Rodney Heights, Gros Islet
- Morne Du Don Government Combined School, Morne Du Don, Castries
- Micoud Primary School, Micoud
- Odsan Combined School, Odsan, Castries
- Patience Combined, Patience, Mon Repos, Micoud
- Plain View Combined, La Ressource Vieux-Fort
- Piaye Combined School, Piaye, Choiseul
- Pierrot Combined School, Pierrot, Vieux-Fort
- Reunion Primary School, Reunion, Choiseul
- Richford Primary, Richford, Dennery
- Riviere Doree Anglican, Riviere Doree, Micoud
- Roblot Government Combined School, DeBrieul, Choiseul
- Roseau R.C. Combined School, Jacmel, Roseau
- Saltibus Combined School, Saltibus, Choiseul
- Soufriere Primary School, Soufriere
- St. Aloysius R.C. Boys Infant & Primary School, Brazil St., Castries
- Tapion Infant & Primary School, Tapion, Castries
- The Montessori Centre (private school), Rodney Heights, Gros-Islet
- Ti-Rocher Combined School, Ti-Rocher, Micoud
- Ti-Rocher Primary School, Ti-Rocher, Castries
- Vide Boutielle Primary School, La Clery, Castries
- Vieux-Fort Primary, Vieux-Fort
