= Deutsche Schule Quito =

- Colegio Alemán de Quito

Location
- Quito; Ecuador
- Coordinates: 0.2096356°S 78.43746770000001°W

Information
- Type: German international school
- Grades: Kindergarten through the final year of senior high school
- Color: green
- Website: caq.edu.ec

Deutsche Schule Quito (Spanish: Colegio Alemán Quito; CAQ) is a German international school in Quito, Ecuador. It serves levels Kindergarten through the final year of senior high school (Bachillerato/Sekundarstufe II - Deutsches Abitur).

== See also ==
- German School of Guayaquil
