= Education in Ecuador =

The Ecuadorian Constitution requires that all children attend school until they achieve a “basic level of education,” which is estimated at nine school years.

The Human Rights Measurement Initiative (HRMI) finds that Ecuador is fulfilling only 83.4% of what it should be fulfilling for the right to education based on the country's level of income. HRMI breaks down the right to education by looking at the rights to both primary education and secondary education. While taking into consideration Ecuador's income level, the nation is achieving 79.6% of what should be possible based on its resources (income) for primary education and 87.3% for secondary education.

== Primary and secondary ==
This article reflects educational realities that, largely, precede the current government which, since 2006, has devoted an increasing percentage of the GDP to education. The article is badly in need of updating since many things have changed in the last 10 years in general in Ecuador but especially in education. Anecdotally, there now appears to be competition to enroll children in publicly funded schools and high schools. Ecuador

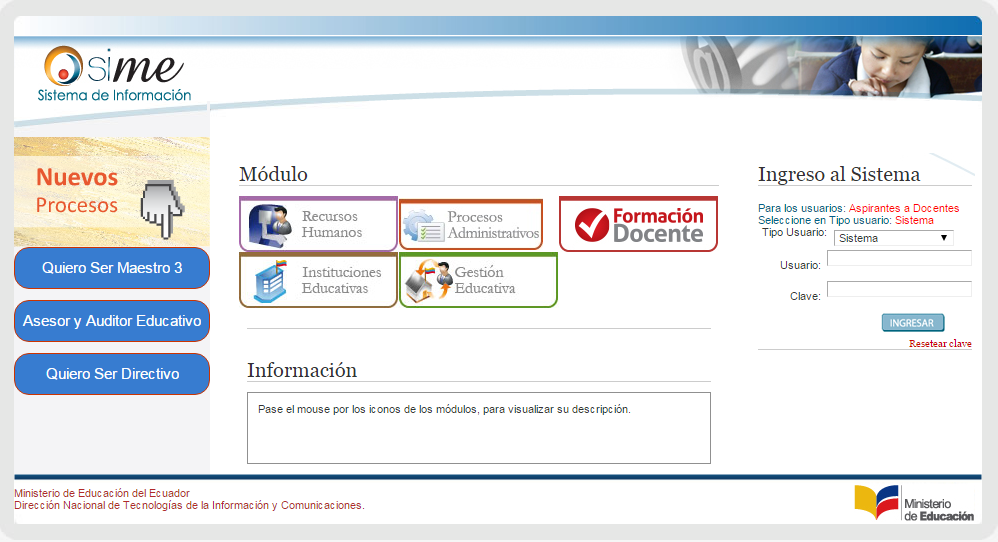
Ministry of Education Information System (SIME) in 2015

In 1996, the net primary enrollment rate was 96.9 percent, and 71.8 percent of children stayed in school until the fifth grade. Primary school attendance rates were unavailable for Ecuador as of 2001.

While enrollment rates indicate a level of commitment to education, they do not always reflect children's participation in school. The cost of primary and secondary education is borne by the government, but families often face significant additional expenses such as fees and transportation costs. In 2000, government spending on education declined, both in real terms and as a proportion of GDP. By 2012, GDP spending had gone from 2.6% to 5.2%.

== Tertiary ==
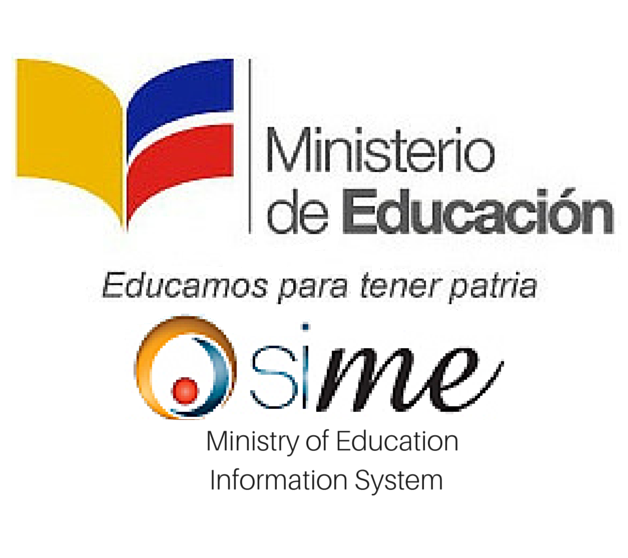
(SIME) Ministry of Education Information System Ecuador

During the 1998-1999 school year, almost 235,000 students were enrolled in institutions of higher education, or approximately 14% of the population between 18–24 years old. Approximately 80% attend public universities while the other 20% attend private universities. The Central University of Ecuador, National Polytechnic School and the Universidad San Francisco de Quito account for more than 60% of enrollments. The graduation rate at public universities is rarely more than 15%.

List of universities in Ecuador

== 2008 Constitution of Ecuador ==
The 2008 Constitution of Ecuador eliminated tuition in public universities. Starting in 2012, admission to the country's 29 public universities will be based on an aptitude test.

== See also ==
- List of universities in Ecuador
- Ministry of Education
