= Qingdao =

City in Shandong, China

Qingdao 青岛市 Tsingtao
- Prefecture-level and sub-provincial city
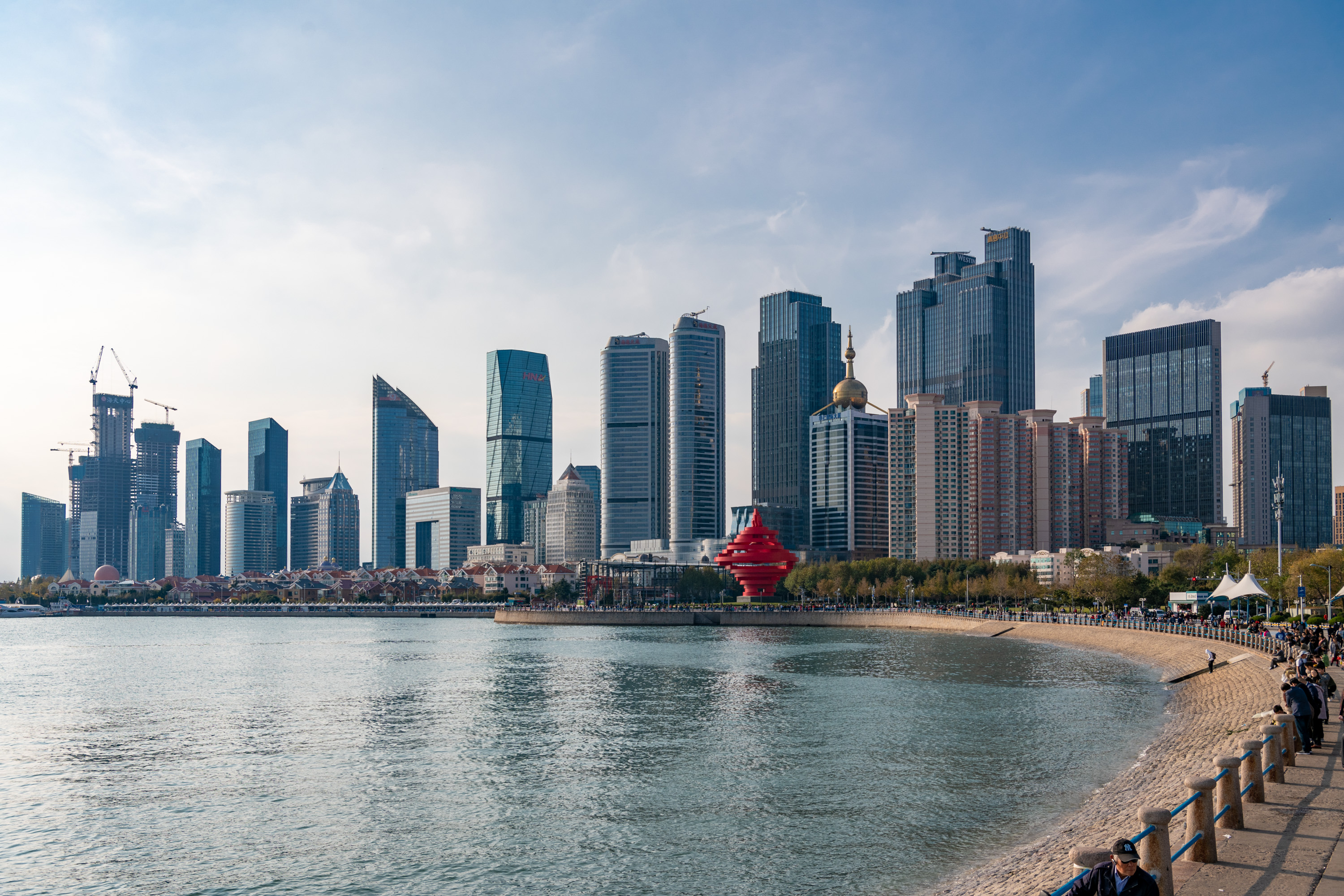
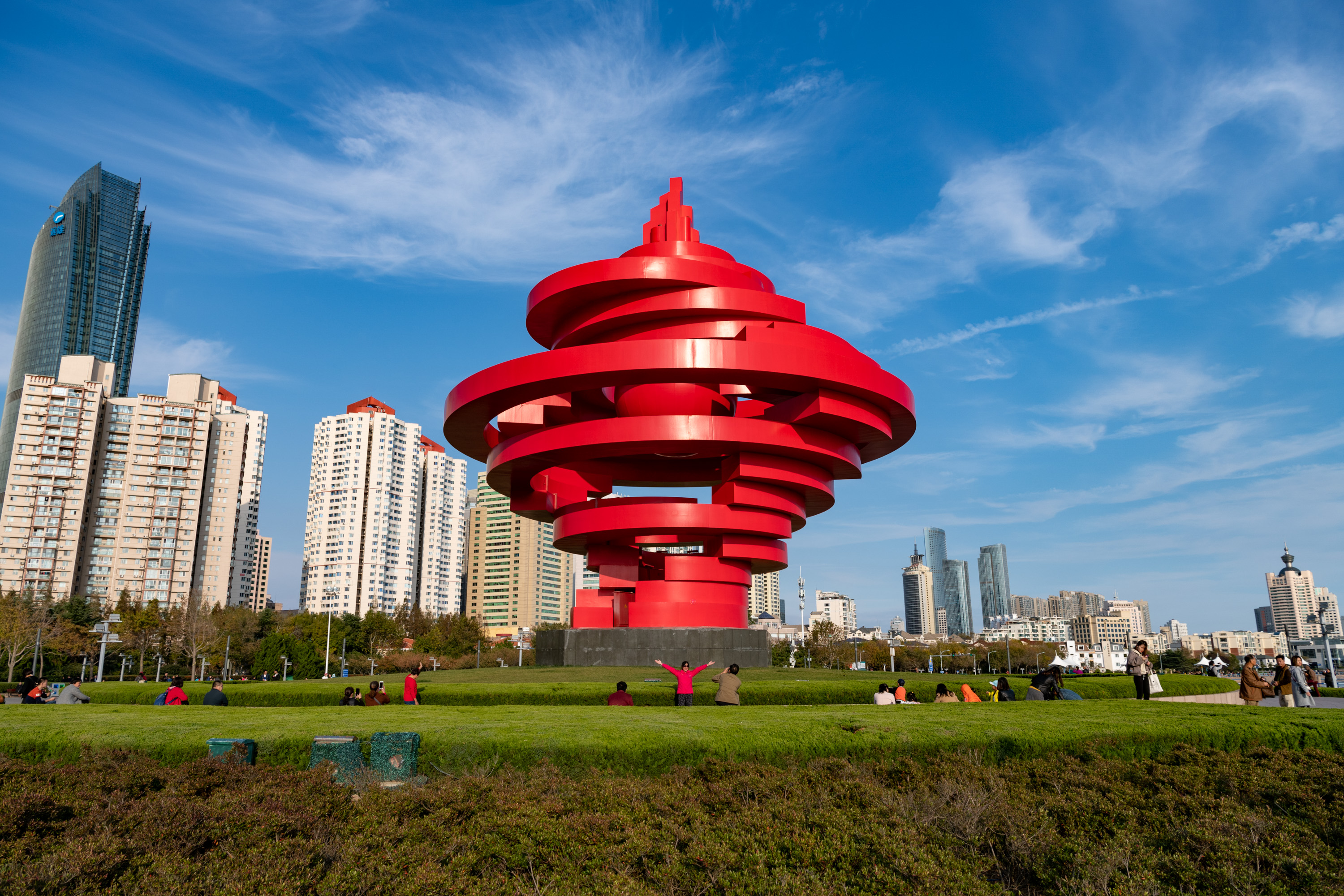
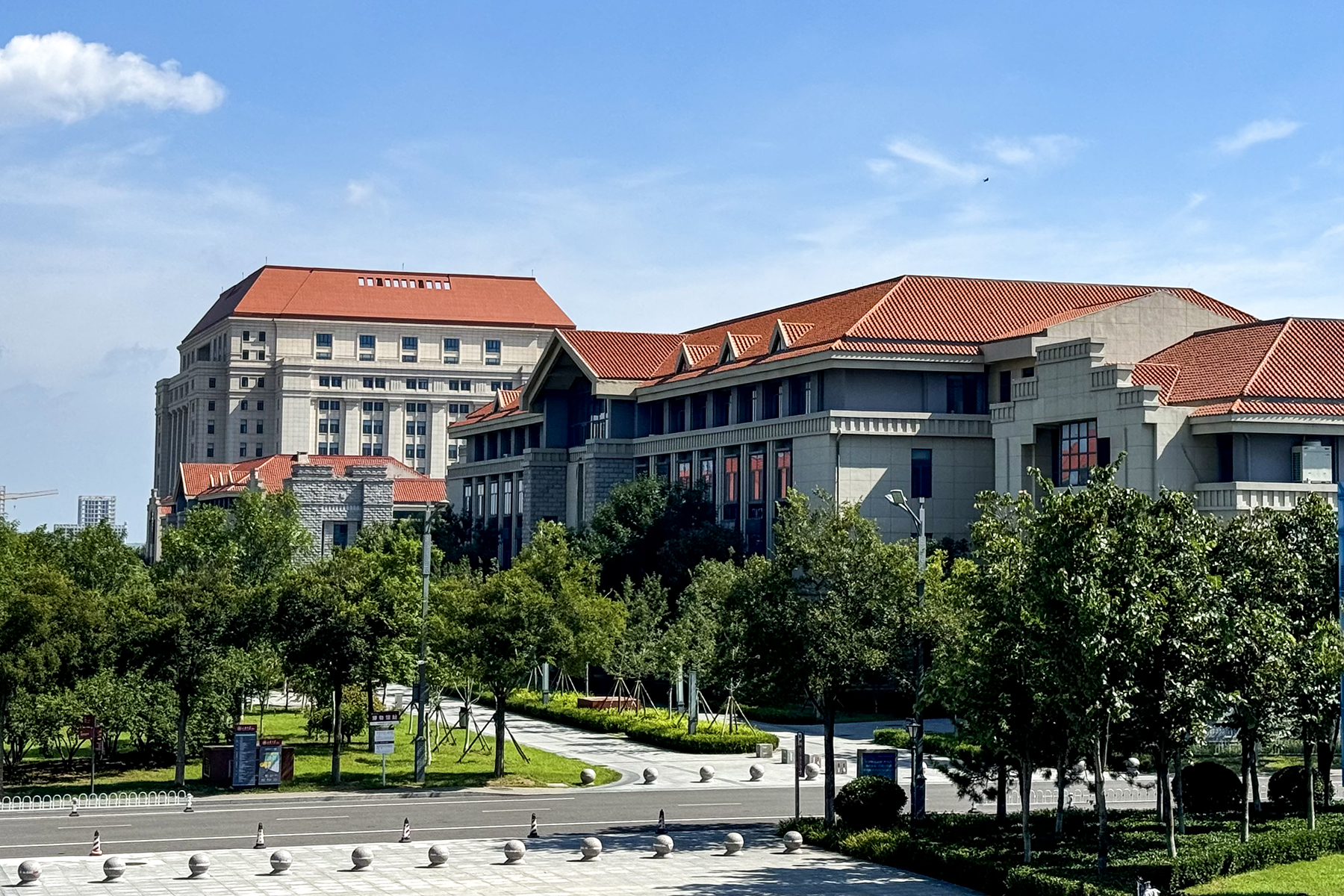
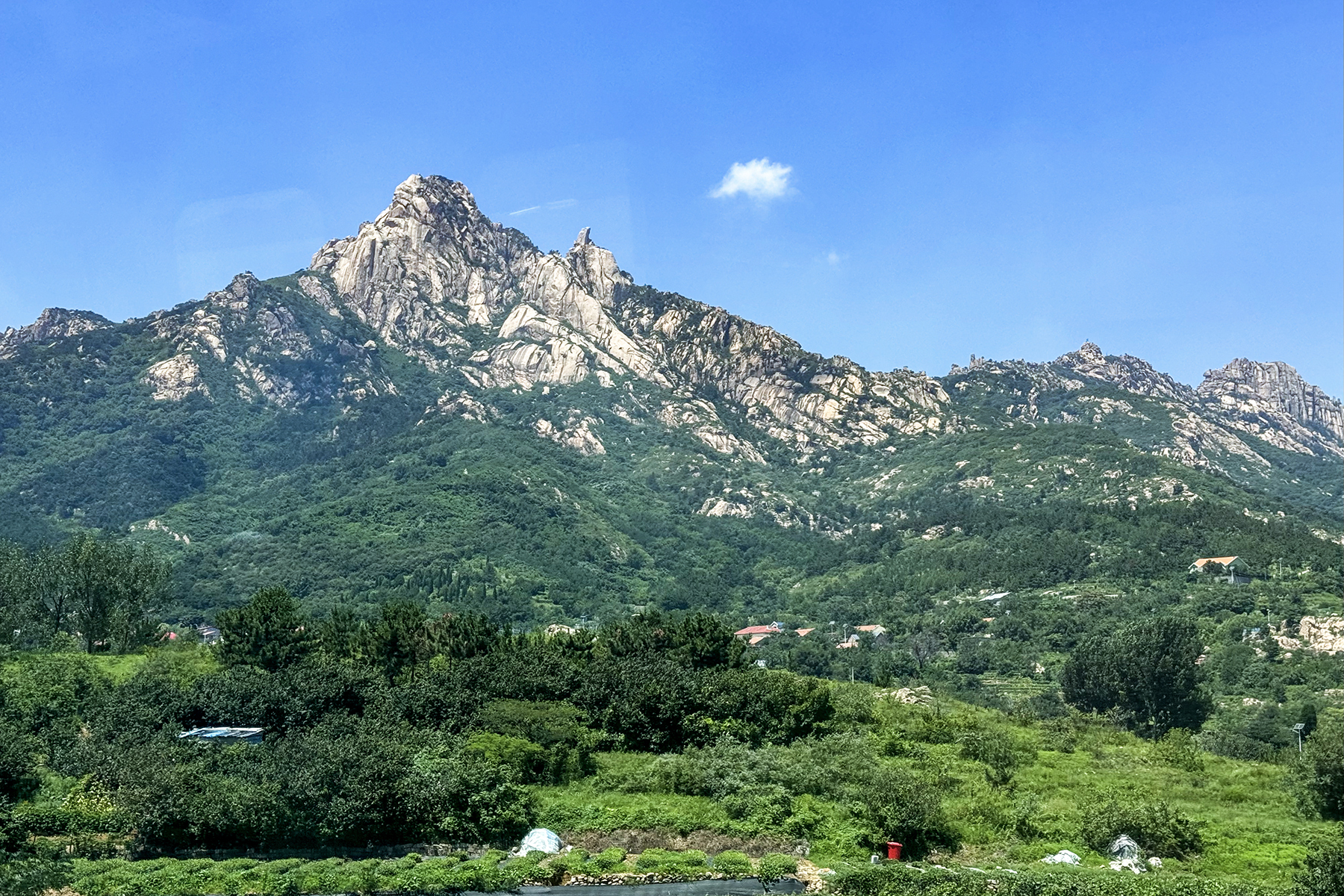
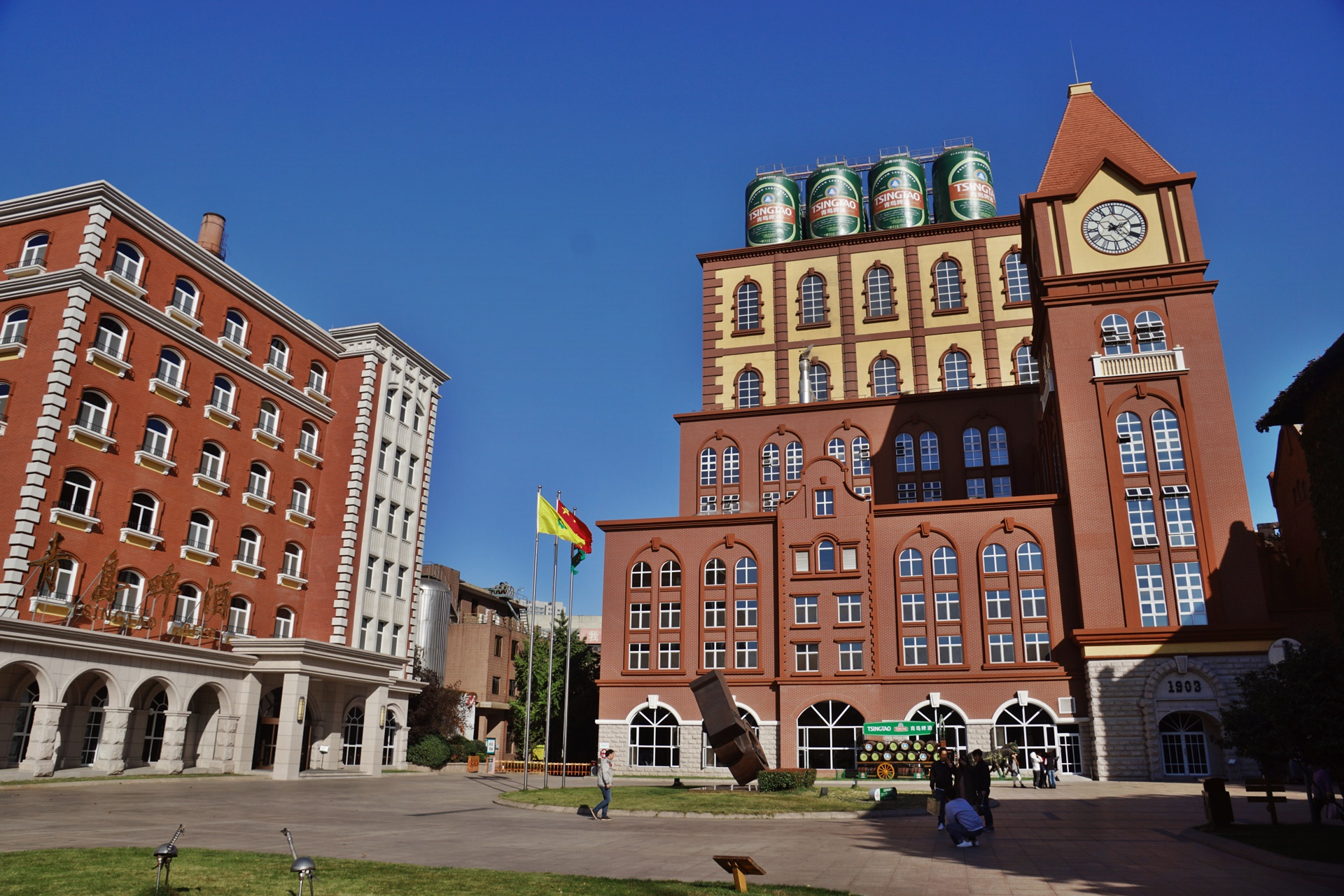
- Skyline of Qingdao May Fourth Square SDU Qingdao Mount Lao Tsingtao Brewery Museum

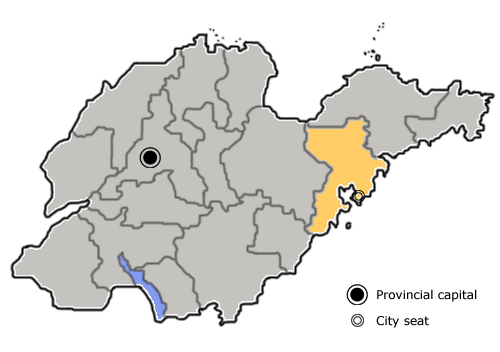
- Location of Qingdao City jurisdiction in Shandong

- Location of the seat Qingdao (Shandong) Qingdao (Qingdao)
- Coordinates (city seat): 36°04′01″N 120°22′58″E
- Country: China
- Province: Shandong
- Lease to Germany: 6 March 1898
- Japanese occupation: 7 November 1914
- Return to China: 10 December 1922
- Japanese Occupation: 10 January 1938
- Return to China: 15 August 1945
- Municipal seat: Shinan District

Government
  - Type: Sub-provincial city
  - Body: Qingdao Municipal People's Congress
  - CCP Secretary: Zeng Zanrong
  - Congress Chairman: Mei Jianhua
  - Mayor: Ren Gang
  - CPPCC Chairman: Meng Qingbin

Area
  - City (Note: "City" here is used in the broad administrative sense, including entities outside the contiguous built-up urban area (see Administrative divisions of China § Ambiguity of the word "city" in China).): 11,293 km^{2} (4,360 sq mi)
  - Urban: 1,759 km^{2} (679 sq mi)

Population (2020 census)
  - City: 10,071,722
  - Density: 891.86/km^{2} (2,309.9/sq mi)
  - Urban: 5,806,000
  - Urban density: 3,301/km^{2} (8,549/sq mi)

GDP(2025)
  - City: CN¥ 1.773 trillion US$ 254.6 billion
  - Per capita: CN¥ 168,919; US$ 24,257
- Time zone: UTC+8 (China Standard)
- Postal code: 266000
- Area code: 0532
- ISO 3166 code: CN-SD-02
- License Plate Prefix: 鲁B & 鲁U
- Coastline: 862.64 km (536.02 mi); (inclusive of offshore islands); 730.64 km (454.00 mi); (exclusive of islands)
- Major Nationalities: Han: 99.86%
- County-level divisions: 10
- Climate: Dwa/Cwa
- Website: qingdao.gov.cn
- Symbols
- Flower: China rose Camellia
- Tree: Cedrus

Qingdao
- "Qingdao" in Simplified (top) and Traditional (bottom) Chinese characters

Chinese name
- Simplified Chinese: 青岛
- Traditional Chinese: 青島
- Postal: Tsingtao
- Literal meaning: "Verdant Island"
Transcriptions
Standard Mandarin
- Hanyu Pinyin: Qīngdǎo
- Bopomofo: ㄑㄧㄥ ㄉㄠˇ
- Gwoyeu Romatzyh: Chingdao
- Wade–Giles: Chʻing^{1}-tao^{3}
- Tongyong Pinyin: Cingdǎo
- Yale Romanization: Chīngdǎu
- MPS2: Chīngdǎu
- IPA: [tɕʰíŋ.tàʊ]
Yue: Cantonese
- Yale Romanization: Chīng Dóu
- Jyutping: Cing¹ Dou²
- IPA: [tsʰɪŋ˥.tɔw˧˥]
Southern Min
- Hokkien POJ: Chheng-tó
- Tâi-lô: Tsheng-tó

Japanese name
- Kanji: 青島
- Hiragana: チンタオ
Transcriptions
- Romanization: Chintao

German name
- German: Tsingtau

Qingdao, (Note: /ˈtʃɪŋˌdaʊ/ CHING-dow; Chinese: 青岛; pinyin: Qīngdǎo, Mandarin: [tɕʰíŋtàʊ]) previously transliterated as Tsingtao, is a prefecture-level city in China's Shandong province. Lying across the Shandong Peninsula and looking out to the Yellow Sea, it borders the prefecture-level cities of Yantai to the northeast, Weifang to the west, and Rizhao to the southwest. The Jiaozhou Bay Bridge links Qingdao's main urban area with Huangdao district, straddling Jiaozhou Bay.

Qingdao was an important fortress, and is a major seaport and naval base, as well as a commercial and financial center. It is a major nodal city of the Belt and Road Initiative (BRI) that connects Continental and East Asia with Europe.

Administered at the sub-provincial level, Qingdao has jurisdiction over seven districts and three county-level cities (Jiaozhou, Pingdu, Laixi). As of the 2020 census, Qingdao's built-up (or metro) area, comprising the seven urban districts (Shinan, Shibei, Huangdao, Laoshan, Licang, Chengyang and Jimo) was home to 7,172,451 inhabitants, making it the 15th largest city in China by population. It has the highest GDP of any city in the province.

In 1897, the city was ceded to Germany. For the Germans, Qingdao was a strategic trade center, port and base for its East Asia Squadron, allowing the German navy to project dominance in the Pacific. In 1914, following the outbreak of World War I, Japan occupied the city and the surrounding province during the Siege of Tsingtao. In 1915, China agreed to recognize Japan's special position in the territory through what became known as the Twenty-One Demands. In 1918, the Chinese government, under the control of the warlord Duan Qirui, secretly agreed to Japanese terms in exchange for a loan. Following the First World War, during the Paris Peace Conference, Japan secured agreements with the Allied powers to recognize its claim to the areas in Shandong, which included Qingdao, previously occupied by Germany. The recognition directly triggered the May Fourth Movement among the Chinese public in a strong response. In 1922, Shandong reverted to Chinese control following the United States' mediation during the Washington Naval Conference.

Qingdao is home to electronics multinationals such as Haier and Hisense. Its historic German-style architecture and Tsingtao Brewery, the second largest brewery in China, are legacies of the German occupation (1898–1914). Qingdao is classified as a Large-Port Metropolis.

In 2007, Qingdao was named as one of China's top ten cities by the Chinese Cities Brand Value Report. In 2009, Qingdao was named China's most livable city by the Chinese Institute of City Competitiveness. In 2018, Qingdao held the Shanghai Cooperation Organization summit. In the 2024 Global Financial Centers Index, Qingdao ranked 31st. In 2024, Qingdao was rated as a Beta- level global city by the Globalization and World Cities Research Network.

Qingdao is also one of the world's top 35 cities for global scientific research as tracked by the Nature Index. The city was also ranked 20th globally in the "Global Top 100 Science & Technology Cluster Cities" as of 2024. It is home to several notable universities, including the Ocean University of China, China University of Petroleum, Shandong University of Science and Technology, Qingdao University, Qingdao University of Science and Technology, Qingdao University of Technology, and Qingdao Agricultural University.

== History ==
=== Antiquity ===
People have lived in the Qingdao area since the Neolithic. The oldest farming sites found so far belong to the Beixin culture (about 5400–4400 BC), such as the Nanguojia site in Pingdu. The area was later home to the Dongyi, and remains of the Dawenkou, Longshan and Yueshi cultures have been found across the city. At the Beiqian site in Jimo, a few kilometers from the coast, digs in 2007, 2009 and 2011 found a large number of human burials from the early Dawenkou period, about 6,100 to 5,500 years ago. The Sanlihe site in Jiaozhou was excavated in 1974 and 1975. Its lower Dawenkou layer held five house sites and 66 graves, and the Longshan layer above it held 98 graves. The Yueshi culture is named after the village of Dongyueshi in Pingdu. The site there was first dug in 1960, and the archaeologist Yan Wenming gave the culture its name in 1981.

In 567 BC the state of Qi conquered the neighboring state of Lai and set up the city of Jimo as a secondary capital in its east. This old Jimo did not stand where today's Jimo District is. It was near Guxian in present-day Pingdu, where about 1,100 meters of its rammed-earth east wall still stand. During the Spring and Autumn and Warring States periods, Jimo was the second-largest city in the Shandong region. Archaeologists think its area was close to that of the Qi capital Linzi, and larger than the Lu capital at Qufu. The city is best known for the siege of 279 BC. By then the state of Yan had taken more than 70 Qi cities. The Qi general Tian Dan held Jimo and broke the siege with a night attack using oxen with burning tails, after which Qi won back all of its lost land.

Langya, on the southern coast in today's Huangdao District, was another important place. According to traditional accounts, Goujian, king of Yue, made Langya his capital. After unifying China, Qin Shi Huang visited Langya three times on his tours of the empire. Archaeologists have confirmed that the ruins at Langyatai are the terrace he ordered built during his eastern tour of 219 BC. The remains include a T-shaped rammed-earth platform of about 45,000 square meters, kilns that made tiles and bricks, and a drainage system. It is the earliest and largest Qin state building project found so far in eastern China.

Under the Qin, old Jimo was the seat of Jiaodong Commandery. Under the Western Han, it was the capital of the Jiaodong Kingdom. The future Emperor Wu of Han was King of Jiaodong when he was young. Liu Ji, King Kang of Jiaodong, also ruled from the city, which is why it was also called "Kangwang City" (康王城). Old Jimo stayed the main center of the Jiaodong region until 556, when the Northern Qi abolished Jimo County. A new county office for Jimo was built in 596, under the Sui dynasty, in what is now Jimo District. It was rebuilt many times over the next centuries, and it is the only old county office in Shandong whose three main halls all still stand.

In 623, early in the Tang dynasty, the town of Banqiao was set up in what is now Jiaozhou, close to Jiaozhou Bay. Under the Song dynasty it became the largest port for foreign trade in northern China. In 1088 the Song court opened a maritime trade office (shibosi, 市舶司) there to manage the shipping trade. Digs at the Banqiao site since 1996 have turned up more than 30 tonnes of rusted iron coins stuck together, with readable coins dating from the reign of Emperor Huizong. They have also found Song and Yuan porcelain from kilns all over China, and the foundations of large buildings that may have been a government office or warehouse. The site became a national key cultural heritage site in 2013. In the Yuan dynasty, the Jiaolai Canal was dug across the Shandong Peninsula to help shipping by sea.

During the Ming and Qing dynasties, the Qingdao coast was an important part of northern China's coastal defenses. Qingdao itself started as a small fishing village. Its temple to the sea goddess Tianhou was built in 1467 and now houses the Qingdao Folk Custom Museum. Under the Qing, a customs station was set up at the village and it built up a large junk trade.

=== German occupation ===
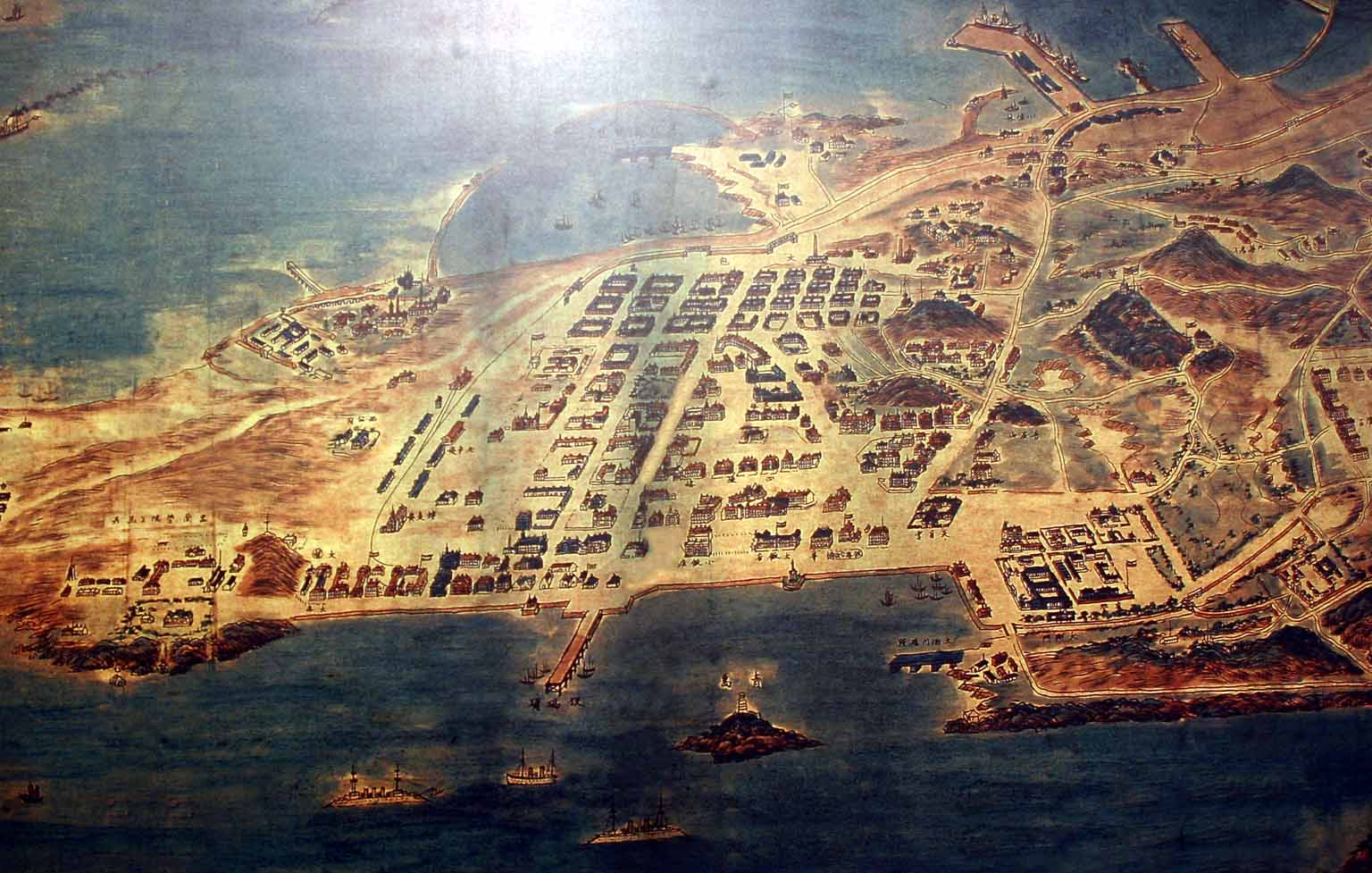
Sketch map of Qingdao, circa 1906

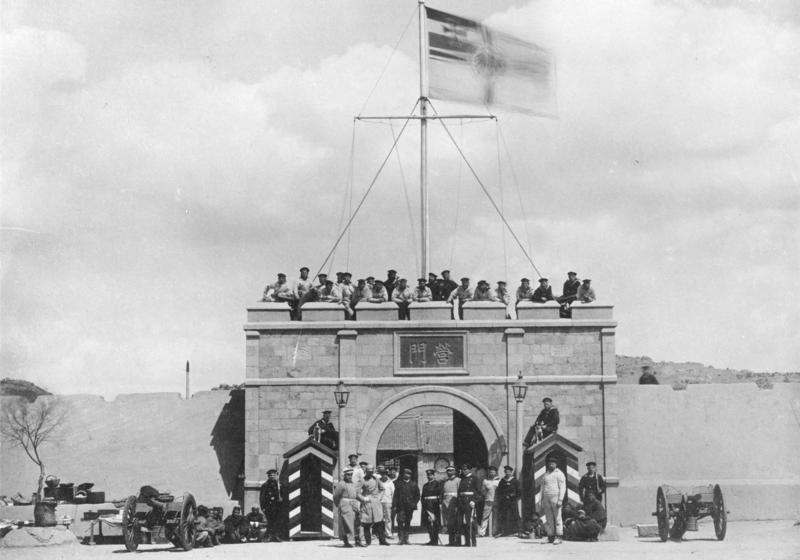
Main gate of former Chinese munitions depot, taken over by the Imperial German Navy, Kiautschou Bay, Shandong peninsula, 1898

Under the Qing Empire, the area in which Qingdao is now located was known as Jiao'ao (胶澳). In 1891, the Qing decided to fortify Jiao'ao as a defense against naval attacks. Imperial German naval officials observed and reported on this activity during a formal survey of Jiaozhou Bay in May 1897. In November of that year, the Juye Incident would take place, in which three German missionaries were attacked, and two were killed. Subsequently, German troops seized and occupied the fortification.

The preindustrial, waning Qing Empire was forced to concede the area to Germany the following year, and the Kiautschou Bay concession, as it became known, existed from 1898 to 1914.

With an area of 552 km^{2} (136,000 acres; 213 sq mi), it was located in the imperial province of Shandong (alternately romanized as Shantung or Shan-tung) on the southern coast of the Shandong Peninsula in northern China. Jiaozhou was alternatively romanized as Kiaochow, Kiauchau, or Kiao-Chau in English, and Kiautschou in German; Qingdao was its administrative center. "The so-called Marktstrasse (Market Street) was nothing more than the old main street of the Chinese village of Qingdao, and the buildings lining it were the former homes of fishermen and farmers. Having sold their property, they resettled their homes and fields in the villages further east."

Upon gaining control of the area, the Germans developed Qingdao's infrastructure, including wide streets, solid housing areas, government buildings, electrification throughout, a sewer system and a safe drinking water supply, a rarity in large parts of Asia at that time and later.

The area had the highest school density and the highest per capita student enrollment in all of China, with primary, secondary and vocational schools funded by the Imperial German treasury and Protestant and Roman Catholic missions. Commercial interests established the Germania Brewery in 1903, which later became the world-famous Tsingtao Brewery. German cultural and commercial influences extended to other areas of Shandong Province, including the establishment of diverse commercial enterprises.

Identified by the German authorities as a strategically important port, Qingdao was administered by the Imperial Department of the Navy (Reichsmarineamt) rather than the Imperial Colonial Office (Reichskolonialamt). The growing Imperial German Navy based their East Asia Squadron there, allowing the warships to conduct operations throughout the western Pacific. Beginning in January 1898, the marines of III. Seebataillon were based at Qingdao. Construction of the Jiaoji Railway began on 23 September 1899, and was completed in 1904.

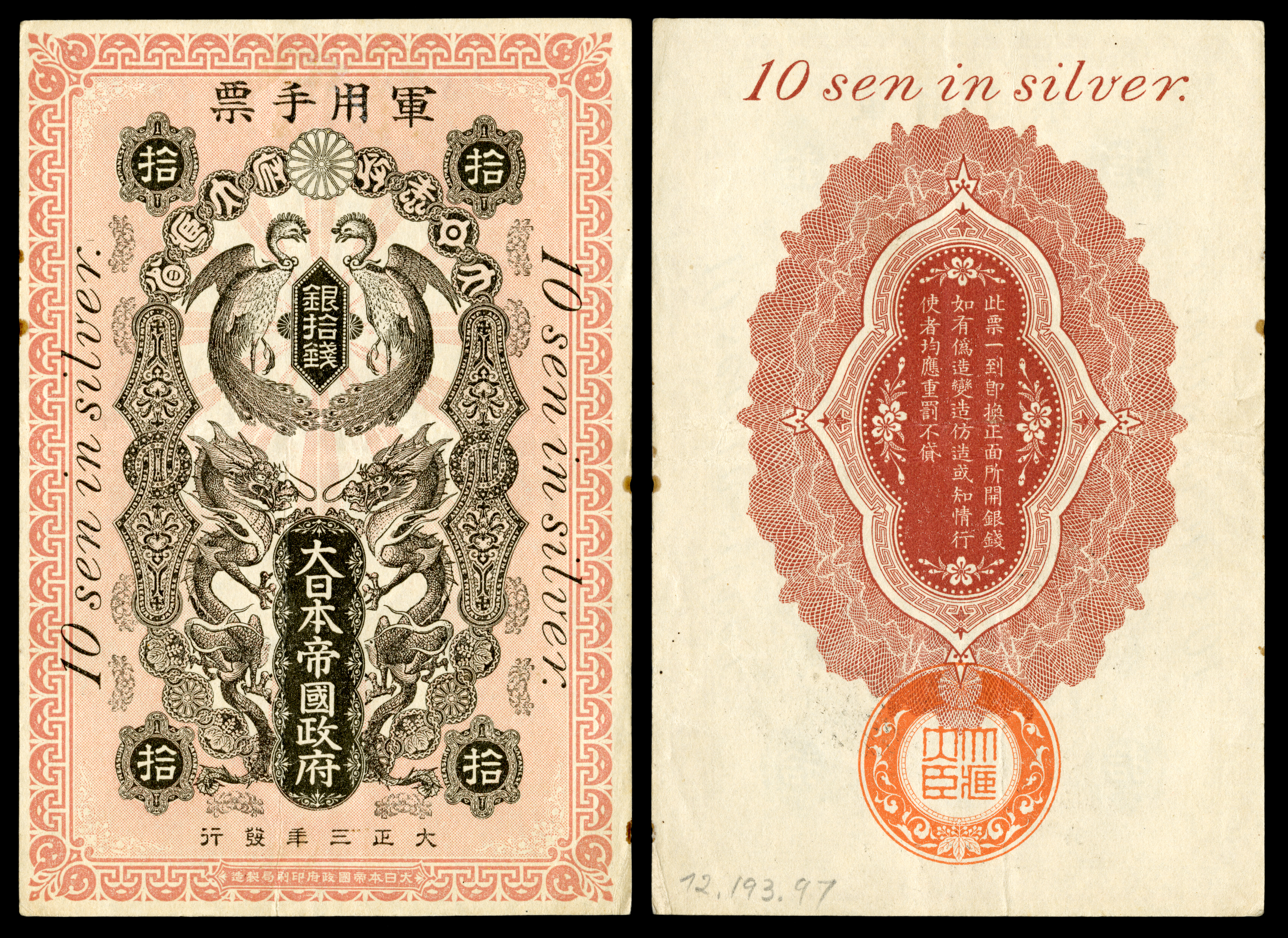
Japanese military currency
- Siege of Tsingtao
- 10 sen (1914)

Before the outbreak of World War I (1914–1918), ships of the German naval forces under Admiral Count von Spee were located at central Pacific colonies on routine missions. The fleet then rendezvoused in the Marianas Islands to plan a transit back to Germany rather than be trapped in the Pacific by more powerful and numerous Allied fleets (British and Japanese). (Note: See East Asia Squadron, Battle of Coronel and Battle of the Falkland Islands for fleet engagements.)

=== Japanese occupation ===
After a minor British naval attack on the German concession in Shandong in 1914, Japanese troops occupied the city and the surrounding province during the Siege of Tsingtao (Qingdao) after Japan's declaration of war on Germany in accordance with the Anglo-Japanese Alliance. China protested against Japan's violation of her neutrality but was not able to interfere in the military operations. The decision of the Paris Peace Conference and the Versailles Treaty negotiations not to restore Chinese rule over the previous foreign concessions in Qingdao after the Great War triggered the May Fourth Movement (4 May 1919) of anti-imperialism, nationalism and cultural identity in China.

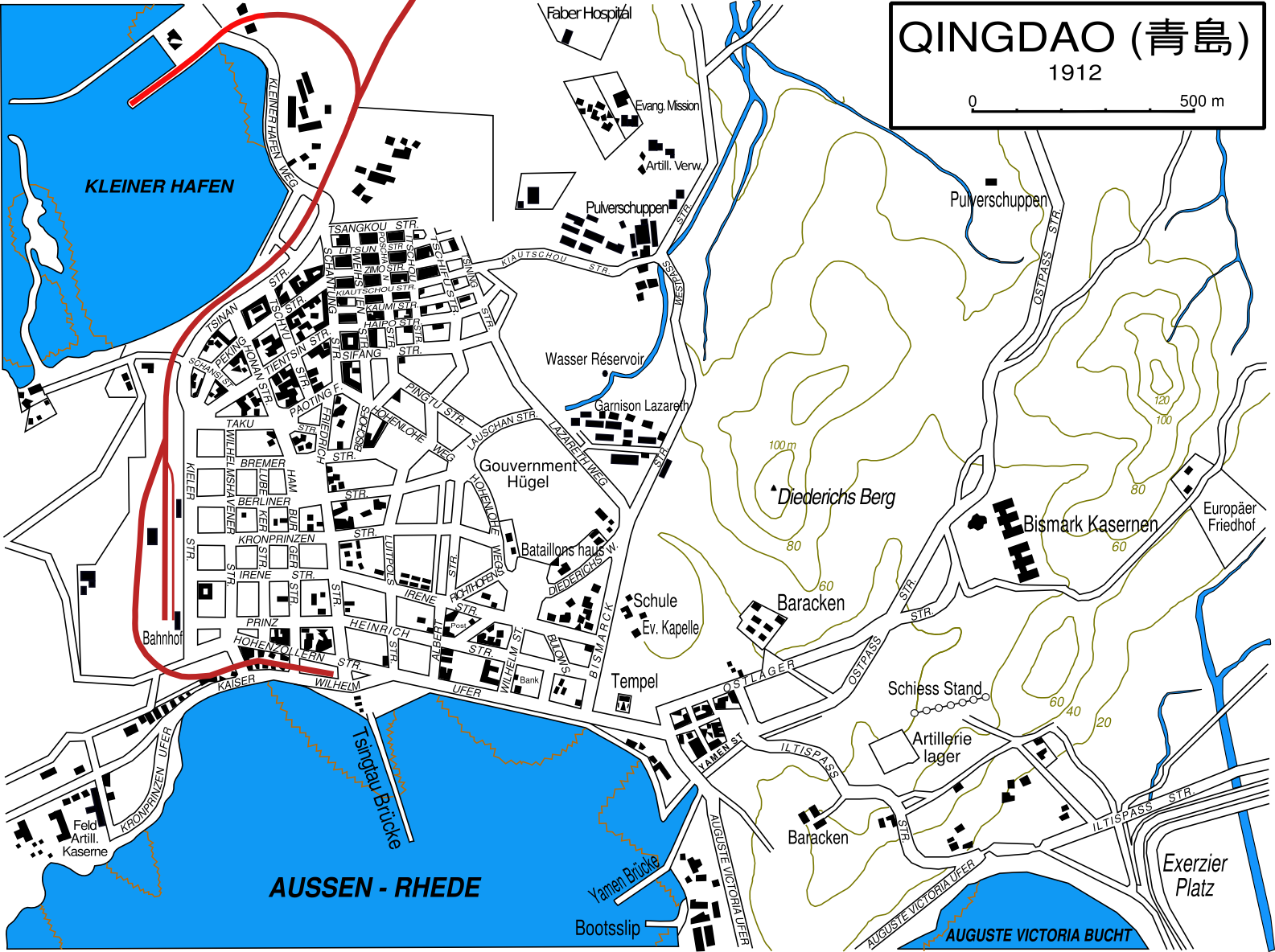
Map of Qingdao in 1912

The city came under Chinese rule in December 1922, under control of the Republic of China (ROC) established in 1912 after the 1911 Revolution the year before. However, Japan maintained its economic dominance of the railway and the province as a whole. The city became a direct-controlled municipality of the ROC Government in July 1929.

Japan re-occupied Qingdao in 1938, a year after it expanded the Second Sino-Japanese War (1937–1945), (a precursor to World War II, 1939–1945) with its plans of territorial expansion into China's coast. Nationalist (Kuomintang) ROC forces returned after the Japanese surrender in September 1945. On 2 June 1949, during the Chinese Civil War and shortly before the founding of the communist People's Republic of China on 1 October 1949 the city was taken by Chairman Mao Zedong and his troops.

=== Qingdao city planning and development ===
==== 1898–1914 ====
The development of the Qingdao urban space during the German occupation (1898–1914) originated from the port. Mass urban construction began in 1898 with the relocation of Chinese dwellers along the coast. With the completion of such series of mass construction projects such as wharves, the Tsingtao-Jinan Railway Line, Tsingtao Railway Station and locomotive works, a city was starting to take shape. The area had the highest school density and highest per capita student enrollment in all of China, with primary, secondary and vocational schools funded by the Berlin treasury as well as Protestant and Roman Catholic missions.

In 1910, the Germans drew up for the second time the city planning of Tsingtao (Warner 2001, p. 33). The former urban area was extended four times highlighted by the emphasis on the development of commerce and trade. Sun Yat-sen (1866–1925), leader of the 1911 Revolution and subsequently first president of the Republic of China, visited the Tsingtao area and stated in 1912, "I am impressed. The city is a true model for China's future".

==== 1914–1922 ====
The development of Tsingtao urban space continued during the first Japan-occupation period (1914–1922). In 1914, Tsingtao was taken over by the Japanese and served as a base for the exploitation of natural resources of Shandong and northern China. With the development of industry and commerce, a "New City District" was established to furnish the Japanese colonists with commercial sections and living quarters, which suggested a striking contrast to the shabby houses in the local Chinese zones (Li 2007, p. 133). In the meantime, several schools, hospitals, and public buildings were constructed, followed by urban streets and intercity highways as well. The urban spatial layout continued to expand northward along the east bay area.

==== 1922–1938 ====
The development of Tsingtao urban space during the ROC-ruled period (1922–1938). This period saw the substantial progress of the urban development of Tsingtao. The government engaged itself in mass construction that gave birth to villa districts at the beach and bank groups in CBD. Plenty of public buildings and facilities for entertainment and sports were completed. By the year 1937, the urban population numbered 385,000 (Lu 2001, p. 327). Tsingtao consequently distinguished itself as a prominent holiday resort and summer retreat.

==== 1938–1945 ====
The development of Tsingtao urban space continued during the second Japan-occupied period (1938–1945). Japanese armed forces returned to Tsingtao in 1938 and started to strive for the construction of the Greater Tsingtao in the following June. Accordingly, they worked out the city planning of the Greater Tsingtao and the City Planning of the Mother Town (Tsingtao City Proper), even though they had not had the opportunity to actualize either, respectively. The period in question did not witness much urban progress except for the logical construction of No. 6 Wharf, some Japanese residences, and a small number of roads and streets (Lu 2001, p. 339).

=== Postwar ===
After World War II, the KMT allowed Qingdao to serve as the headquarters of the Western Pacific Fleet of the US Navy in 1945; however, its headquarters were transferred to the Philippines sometime in late 1948. On 2 June 1949, the CPC-led Red Army entered Qingdao and the city and province have been under PRC control since that time.

Since the 1984 inauguration of China's open-door policy to foreign trade and investment, Qingdao has rapidly developed into an ultramodern port city. It is now the headquarters of the Chinese navy's northern fleet. An early example of the open-door policy occurred on 5 November 1984, when three United States Naval vessels visited Qingdao. This was the first US port call to China in more than 37 years. USS Rentz, USS Reeves, and USS Oldendorf and their crews were officially hosted by the Chinese People's Liberation Army Navy (PLAN).

Northern Qingdao, particularly Shibei, Licang, and Chengyang districts, are now major manufacturing centers. The city has recently experienced a strong growth period, with a new central business district created to the east of the older business district. Outside of the center of the city, there is a large industrial zone, which includes chemical processing, rubber, and heavy manufacturing, in addition to a growing high-tech area. Numerous local and national service companies, rather than manufacturers, are based in the city's southern district.

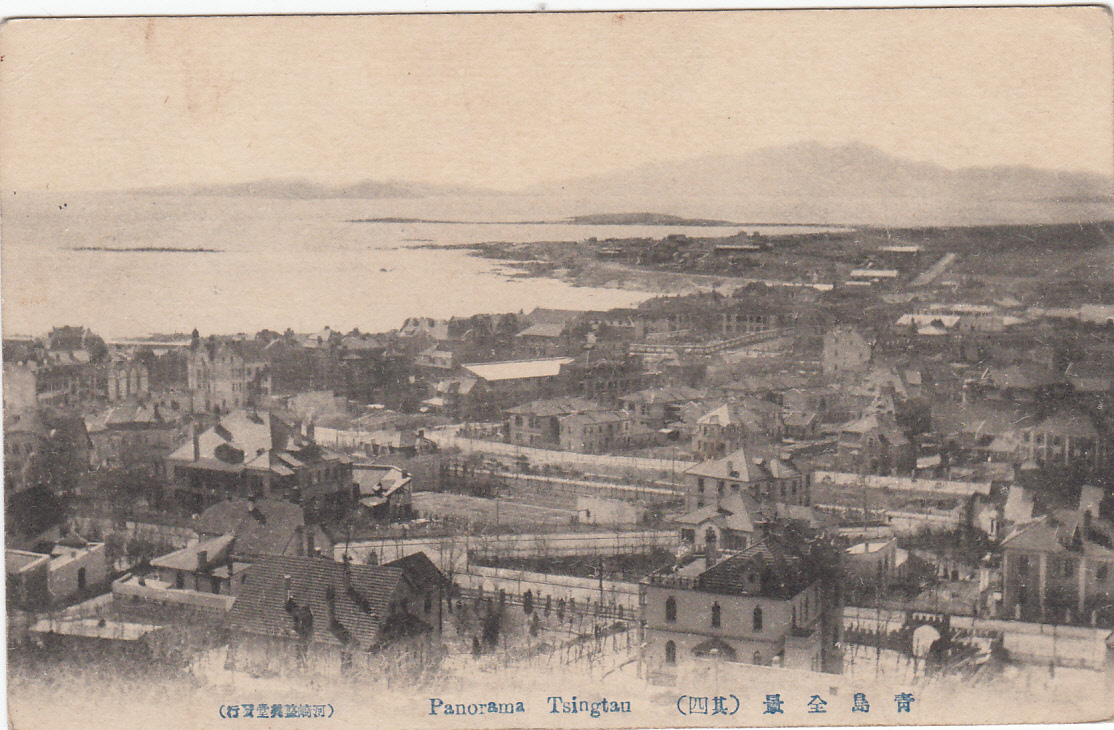
Image of Qingdao in the early 1900s

== Administrative divisions ==
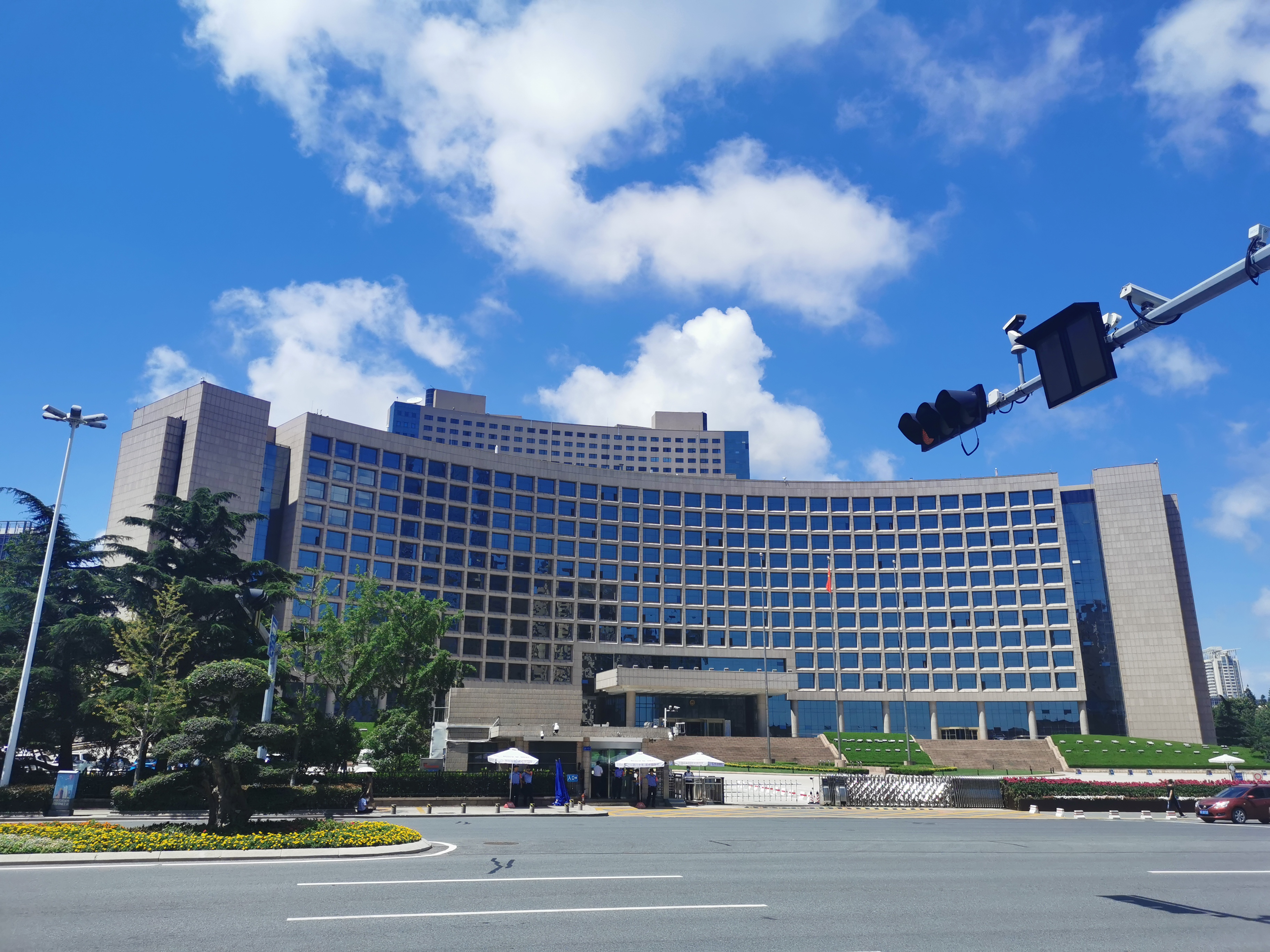
City Hall of Qingdao

The sub-provincial city of Qingdao has seven districts (区; qū) and three county-level cities (市; shì): Qingdao City, located in Shandong Province, China, is a prefecture-level city with several aliases, including "Island City" and "Jiaozhou Bay". Qingdao is a vice-provincial-level city, a separately listed city, and recognized as a major city.

According to the approval of the State Council, Qingdao is designated as an important coastal center city and a coastal resort tourism city in China, as well as an international port city. Qingdao City administers 7 districts and 3 county-level cities. These districts include Shinan District, Shibei District, Huangdao District, Laoshan District, Licang District, Chengyang District, and Jimo District, while the county-level cities consist of Jiaozhou City, Pingdu City, and Laixi City.

Subdivision	Chinese (Simplified)	Pinyin Romanization	Admin. code	Land area (km^{2})	Urbanization rate (%)	Permanent resident population ('000s, 2010)	Population density (1/km^{2})
Districts
Shinan District (city seat)	市南区	Shìnán Qū	370202	30.01	100	544.8	18,153.95
Shibei District	市北区	Shìběi Qū	370203	63.18	100	1,020.7	16,155.43
Huangdao District (Xihai'an New Area)	黄岛区 （西海岸新区）	Huángdǎo Qū (Xīhǎi'àn Xīnqū)	370211	2220.10	80	1,392.6	627.27
Laoshan District	崂山区	Láoshān Qū	370212	389.34	80	379.5	974.73
Licang District	李沧区	Lǐcāng Qū	370213	95.52	100	512.4	5,364.32
Chengyang District	城阳区	Chéngyáng Qū	370214	553.20	80	737.2	1,332.61
Jimo District	即墨区	Jímò Qū	370282	1727	58.1	1,177.2	681.64
County-level cities
Jiaozhou	胶州市	Jiāozhōu Shì	370281	1,210	68.0	843.1	696.78
Pingdu	平度市	Píngdù Shì	370283	3,166	52.8	1,357.4	428.74
Laixi	莱西市	Láixī Shì	370285	1522	58.1	750.2	492.90

Geographically, there are three districts (Shinan, Shibei, Licang) constituting a peninsula on the east coast of the Jiaozhou Bay as the core urban area, one (Chengyang) on the north coast and one (Xihai'an) on the west coast of the Yellow Sea.

- Defunct – Jiaonan city (Chinese: 胶南市; pinyin: Jiāonán Shì) – merged into Huangdao District (December 2012)

== Geography ==
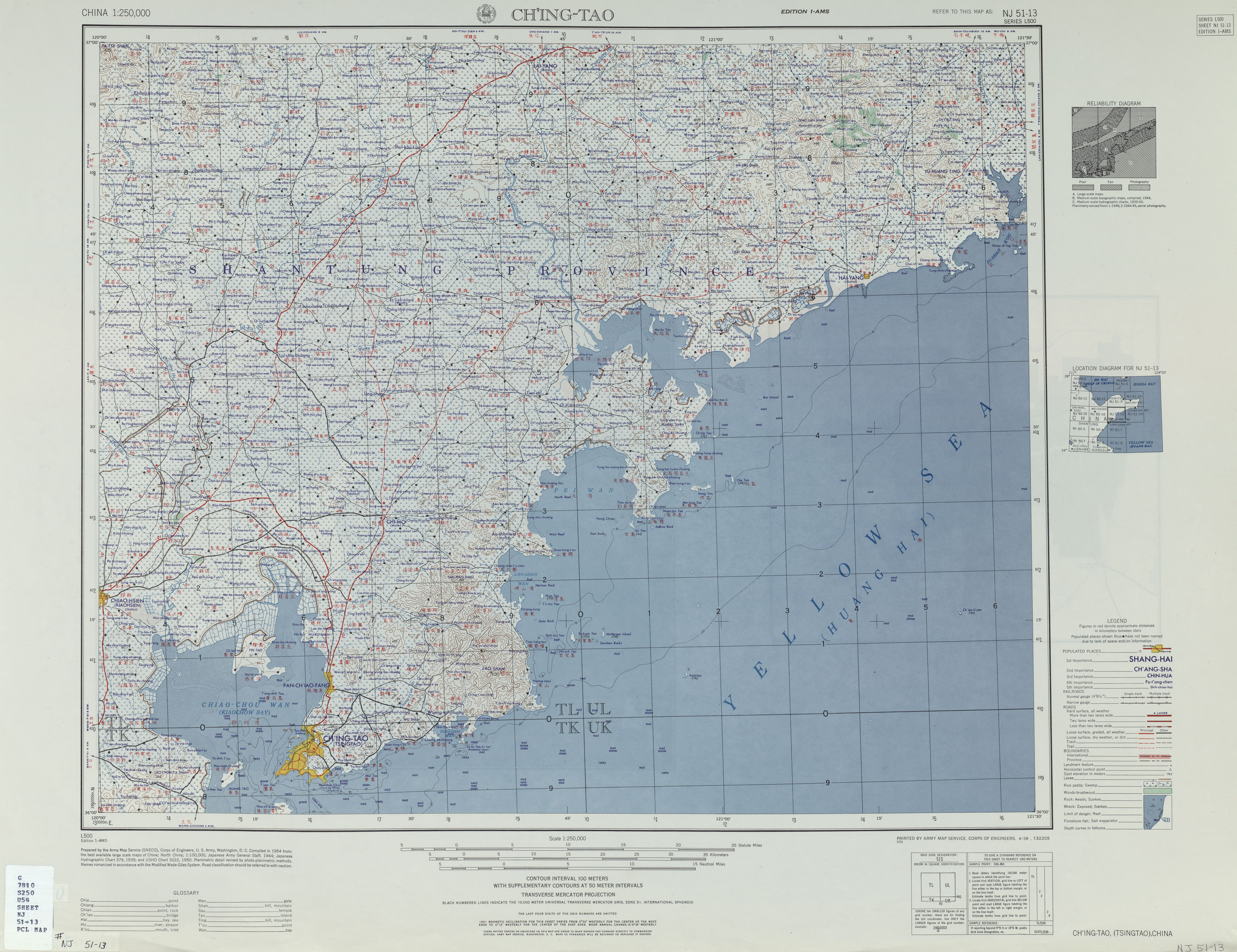
Qingdao (labeled CH'ING-TAO (TSINGTAO) 青島) (1954)

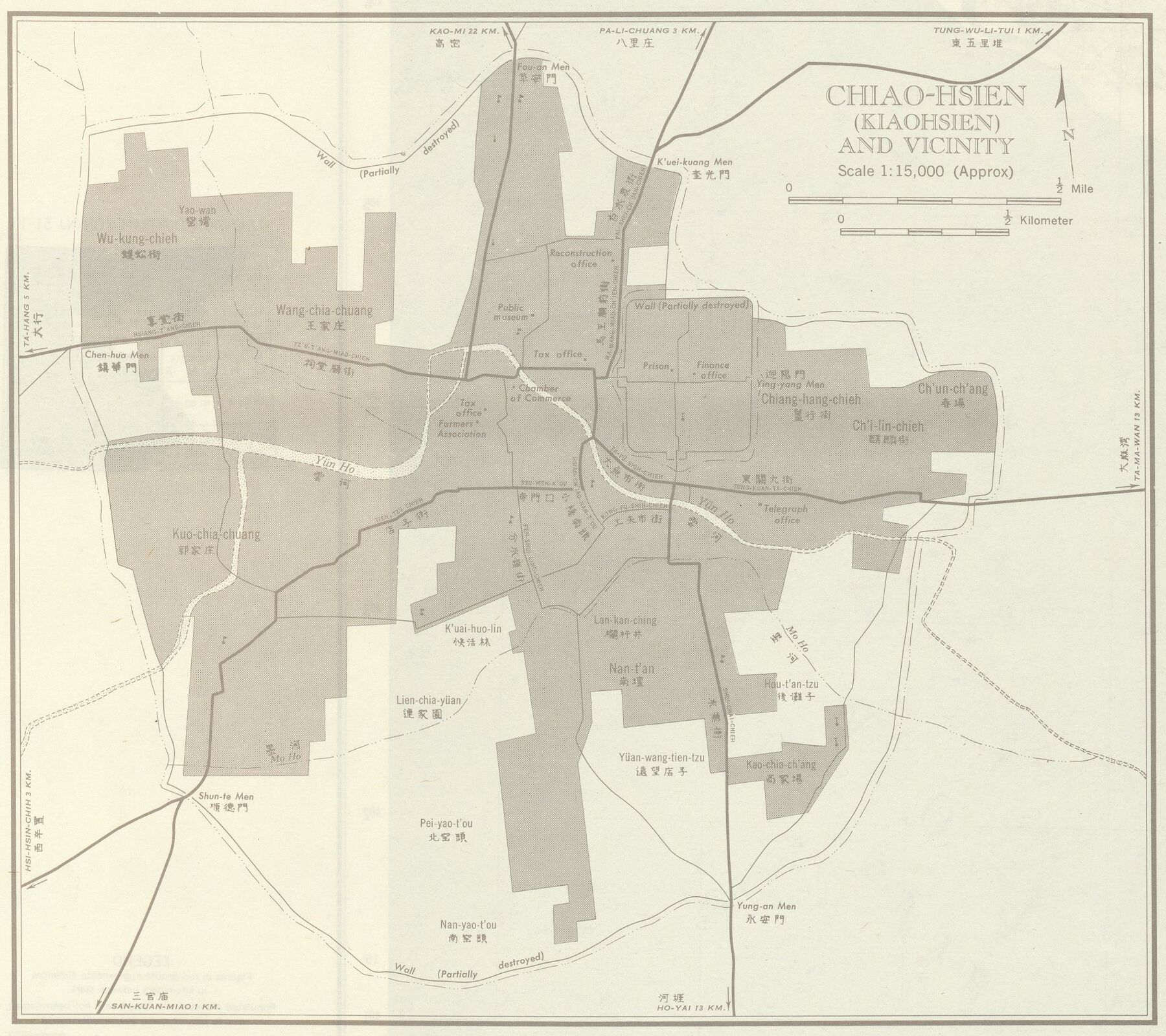
Map including Qingdao (labeled as CH'ING-TAO (TSINGTAO))

Qingdao is located on the south-facing coast of the Shandong Peninsula (German: Schantung-Halbinsel). It borders three prefecture-level cities, namely Yantai to the northeast, Weifang to the west, and Rizhao to the southwest. The city occupies an area totaling 10,654 km^{2} (4,114 sq mi), and stretches in latitude from 35° 35' to 37° 09' N and in longitude from 119° 30' to 121° 00' E. The populated sections of the city are relatively flat while mountains spur up within city limits and nearby. The highest elevation in the city is located 1,133 meters (3,717 ft) above sea level. Of the total area of Qingdao, 15.5% is highland, while the foothill, plain, and lowland areas constitute 25.1%, 37.8%, and 21.7%, respectively. The city has a 730.64-kilometer (454.00 mi)-long coastline. Five significant rivers exceeding 50 kilometers (31 mi) in length can be found in the region.

=== Climate ===
Qingdao has a temperate, four-season, monsoon-influenced climate that lies in the transition between the humid subtropical (Köppen: Cwa) and humid continental (Köppen: Dwa) regimes. Due to the direct regulation of the marine environment, the city is influenced by the southeast monsoon and the currents and water masses from the ocean, so it also has significant maritime climate characteristics. Winters range from cool to cold and windy, but are generally dry, with a January average of 0.2 °C (32.4 °F). Summer is generally hot and humid, but very hot days are rare, with an August average of 25.6 °C (78.1 °F). Due to its proximity to the coast and location on a peninsula, compared to most inland areas of China, its spring is delayed by one month, and the annual diurnal temperature variation is only 6.3 °C (11.3 °F); conversely, its fall is milder than inland areas in Shandong. The water temperature peaks at about 25 °C (77 °F) in late August. Thus, swimming is possible for two months on either side. The annual mean temperature is 13.3 °C (55.9 °F). Extremes since 1951 have ranged from −15.9 °C (3 °F) on 7 and 8 January 2021 to 38.9 °C (102 °F) on 15 July 2002; unofficial readings have reached a record low of −16.9 °C (1.6 °F) or for the official weather station there, −16.4 °C (2.5 °F) on 10 January 1931. With monthly percent possible sunshine ranging from 38 percent in July to 59 percent in October, the city receives 2,261 hours of bright sunshine annually.

During the summer months, the beaches of Qingdao are afflicted by massive algal blooms. The decomposing algae release large amounts of hydrogen sulfide gas, which produces an offensive "rotten egg" odor. Sea lettuce blooms, which are partially caused by seaweed farming in Jiangsu Province, led local officials to declare a "large-scale algae disaster" in 2013.

Climate data for Qingdao, elevation 76 m (249 ft), (1991–2020 normals, extremes 1951–present)
Month	Jan	Feb	Mar	Apr	May	Jun	Jul	Aug	Sep	Oct	Nov	Dec	Year
Record high °C (°F)	13.5 (56.3)	19.6 (67.3)	24.4 (75.9)	27.9 (82.2)	34.2 (93.6)	34.4 (93.9)	38.9 (102.0)	35.8 (96.4)	36.8 (98.2)	30.0 (86.0)	22.9 (73.2)	16.4 (61.5)	38.9 (102.0)
Mean daily maximum °C (°F)	3.4 (38.1)	5.6 (42.1)	10.0 (50.0)	15.7 (60.3)	21.1 (70.0)	24.3 (75.7)	27.6 (81.7)	28.7 (83.7)	25.8 (78.4)	20.2 (68.4)	12.8 (55.0)	5.9 (42.6)	16.8 (62.2)
Daily mean °C (°F)	0.2 (32.4)	2.1 (35.8)	6.2 (43.2)	11.6 (52.9)	17.1 (62.8)	20.8 (69.4)	24.7 (76.5)	25.6 (78.1)	22.3 (72.1)	16.6 (61.9)	9.5 (49.1)	2.7 (36.9)	13.3 (55.9)
Mean daily minimum °C (°F)	−2.4 (27.7)	−0.6 (30.9)	3.4 (38.1)	8.7 (47.7)	14.1 (57.4)	18.5 (65.3)	22.7 (72.9)	23.4 (74.1)	19.5 (67.1)	13.7 (56.7)	6.7 (44.1)	0.1 (32.2)	10.7 (51.2)
Record low °C (°F)	−15.9 (3.4)	−12.1 (10.2)	−6.2 (20.8)	−1.9 (28.6)	5.7 (42.3)	11.2 (52.2)	13.6 (56.5)	14.9 (58.8)	10.1 (50.2)	1.9 (35.4)	−8.1 (17.4)	−13 (9)	−15.9 (3.4)
Average precipitation mm (inches)	10.3 (0.41)	15.7 (0.62)	18.0 (0.71)	34.0 (1.34)	64.1 (2.52)	70.7 (2.78)	159.1 (6.26)	159.6 (6.28)	69.4 (2.73)	35.5 (1.40)	35.2 (1.39)	14.8 (0.58)	686.4 (27.02)
Average precipitation days (≥ 0.1 mm)	2.8	4.0	4.6	6.5	7.7	8.7	11.6	10.9	7.2	5.3	5.2	3.6	78.1
Average snowy days	3.8	3.3	1.6	0.2	0	0	0	0	0	0	0.7	2.7	12.3
Average relative humidity (%)	63	65	65	67	71	82	86	82	71	64	64	63	70
Mean monthly sunshine hours	160.4	164.9	208.6	219.1	234.3	186.0	168.3	194.5	201.1	202.1	163.4	158.5	2,261.2
Percentage possible sunshine	52	53	56	56	54	43	38	47	55	59	54	53	52
Average ultraviolet index	2	3	5	7	9	9	10	9	7	5	3	1	6
Source 1: China Meteorological Administration
Source 2: Weather China Weather Atlas (UV index)NOAA

See or edit raw graph data.

== Demographics ==
Historical population
Year	Pop.	±%
1913	58,000	—
1953	916,846	+1480.8%
1964	1,383,433	+50.9%
1982	4,227,594	+205.6%
1990	6,663,989	+57.6%
2000	7,494,194	+12.5%
2010	8,715,100	+16.3%
2020	9,499,800	+9.0%
Population size may be affected by changes in administrative divisions.

Of the 10 million residents of Qingdao, 6.2 million reside in the Qingdao urban area. Another estimated 5 million live in other cities under Qingdao's jurisdiction. The annual birth rate is calculated around 76,507, with a birth rate of 10.15 per year per thousand, and a death rate of 6.32, both calculated on an annual basis. Living standards are among the highest of leading Chinese cities due to the strong export economy and relatively high family wages.

There is a large Korean community in Qingdao. By 2009, there were approximately 100,000 Koreans working, studying and living in Qingdao, which makes Qingdao the second in terms of Korean population in China, following Beijing which has about 200,000 Koreans.

According to the 2021 Qingdao Statistical Yearbook, the permanent resident population of Qingdao in 2020 was 10.1057 million, an increase of 182,700 people compared to the previous year.

== Economy ==
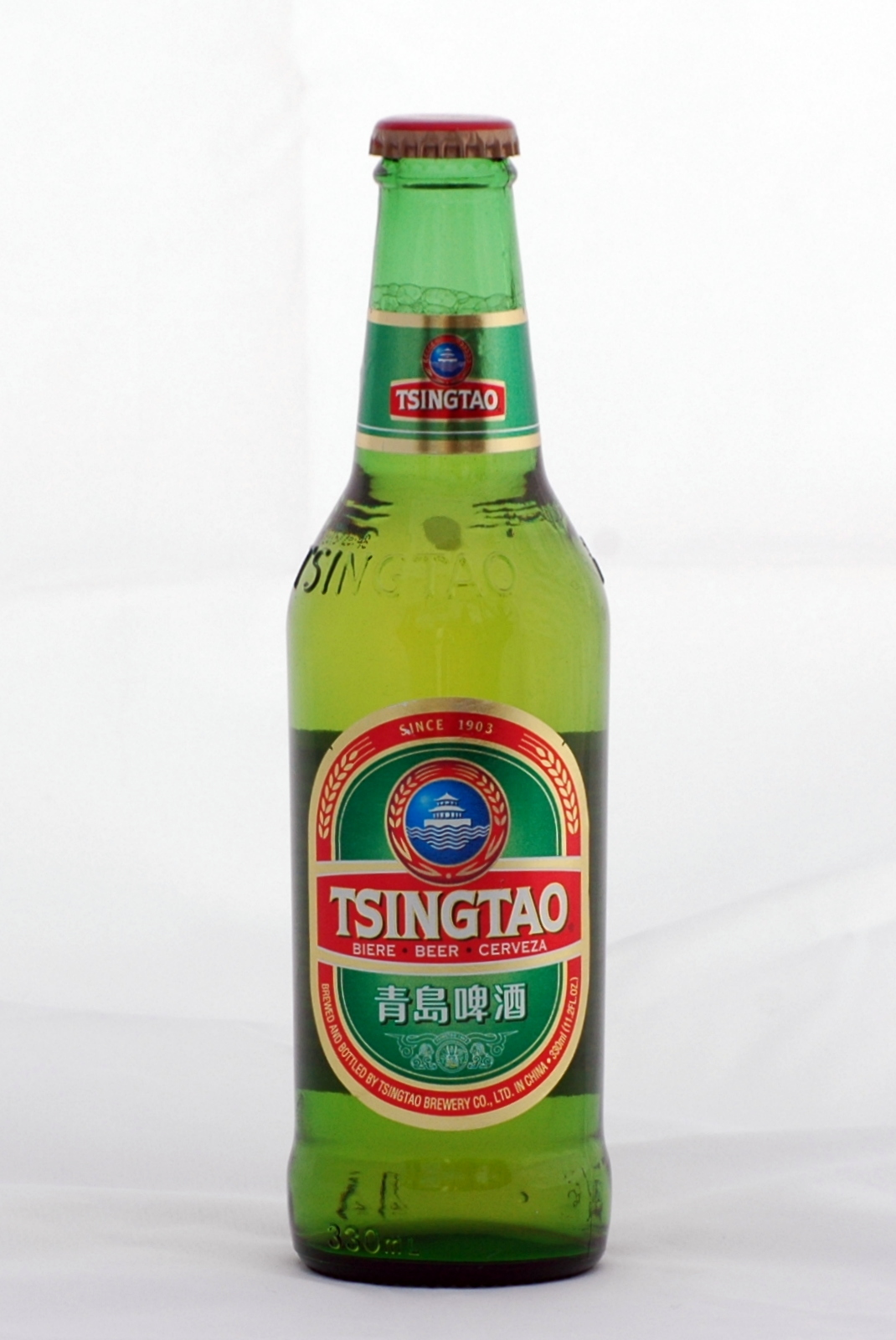
Qingdao-based Tsingtao beer, China's second-largest domestic brand and its largest export brand.

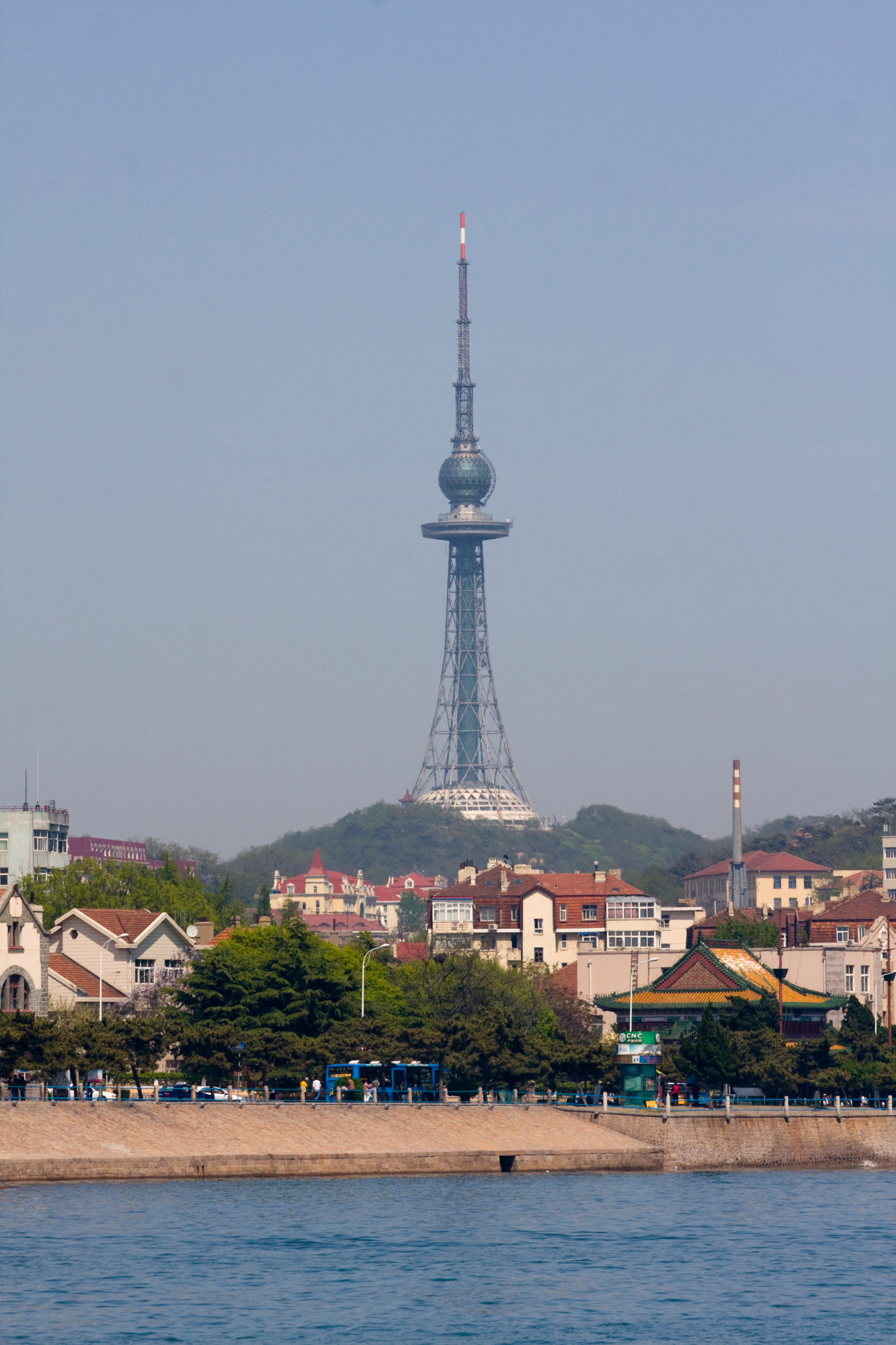
Qingdao TV Tower

In recent years, an important region in Eastern China, Shandong Province has seen substantial change in its economic landscape. Much of this development has been concentrated in Qingdao. Qingdao has seen rapid development. With an annual growth rate of 18.9 percent in 2006, the city's GDP reached 42.3 billion, ranking first in Shandong Province and tenth out of China's top 20 cities. GDP per capita comprised CN¥52,895 (US$7,616) in 2008. In 2024, Qingdao's GDP per capita comprised CN¥161,200 (US$23,000).

In 2006, Qingdao was ranked one of six "golden cities" by the World Bank, out of 120 Chinese cities assessed on factors including investment climate and government effectiveness. In 2018, Qingdao's GDP reached CN¥1200.15 billion, though it shrank a little in 2019.

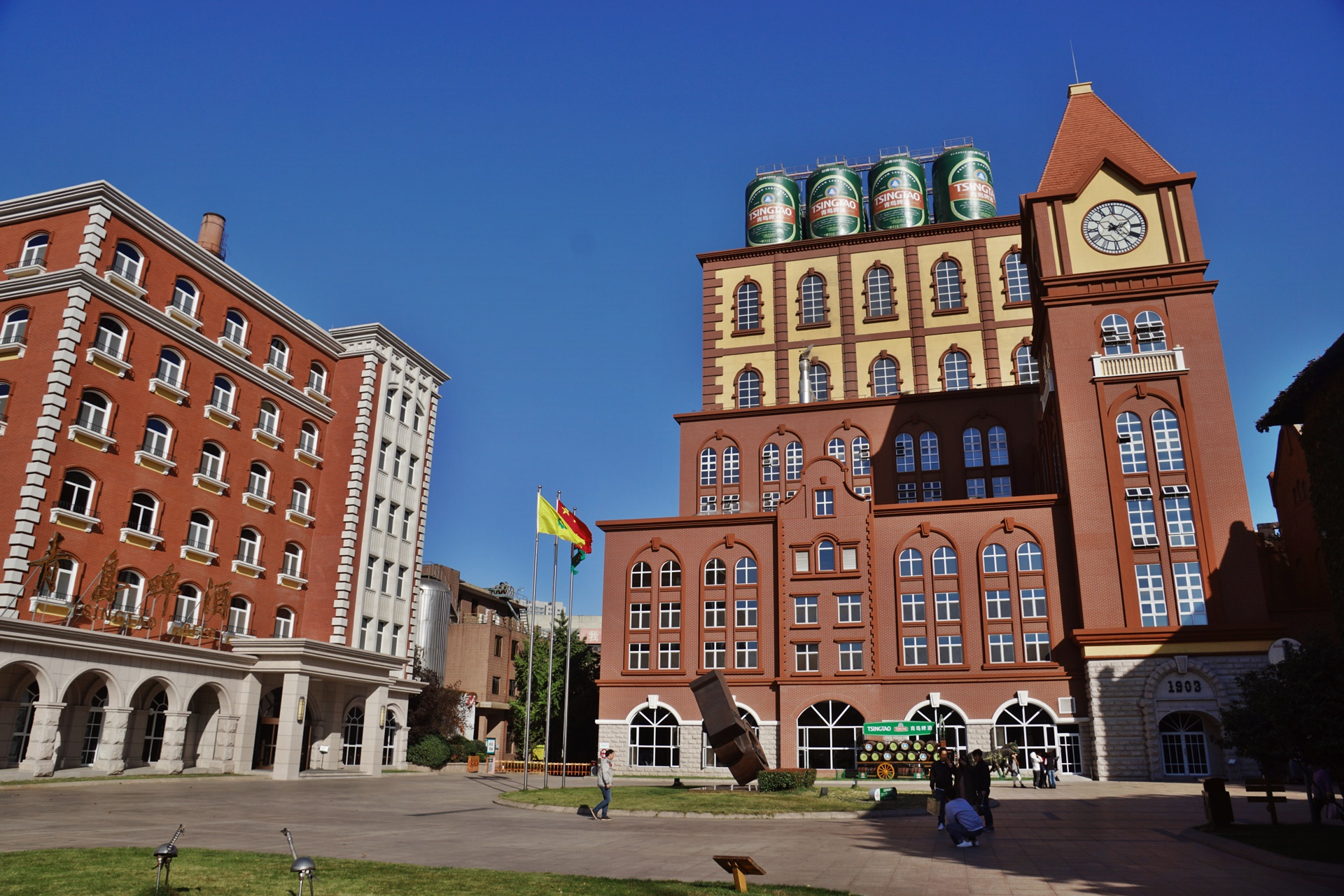
Tsingtao Brewery Company Limited

Internationally, Qingdao is perhaps best known for its Tsingtao Brewery, founded by a German-British joint venture in 1903 that produces Tsingtao beer, the best-known Chinese export beer. It is also home to Haier, a large white goods manufacturer, and Hisense, a major electronics company. In 2002 guitar manufacturers Epiphone opened a factory in Qingdao.

In 1984 the Chinese government named a district of Qingdao a Special Economic and Technology Development Zone (SETDZ). Along with this district, the entire city had gone through fast-tracked development of secondary and tertiary industries. Qingdao has been the recipient of large foreign investment and its port is a hub for local and international trade. South Korea and Japan in particular made extensive investments in the city. In terms of primary sector industries, Qingdao has an estimated 50,000 acres (200 km^{2}) of arable land. Qingdao has a zigzagging pattern coastline, and thus possesses an invaluable stock of fish, shrimp, and other sea resources.

Qingdao's wind power electricity generation performs at among the highest levels in the region.

=== Industrial zones ===
- Qingdao West Coast New District
- Qingdao Special Economic and Technological Development Area
- Qingdao Free Trade Zone
- Qingdao High-tech Industrial Zone
- Qingdao University Industrial Zone

== Transport ==
=== Road ===
There are a total of 1,145 km (711 mi) of roads in the Qingdao area, with nearly 500 km (310 mi) of expressways. These National Trunk Highway System (NTHS) Expressways begin or pass through in Qingdao. Expressways that begin in Qingdao are in Bold:

- G15 Shenhai Expressway (Shenyang, Liaoning–Haikou, Hainan)
- G18 Rongwu Expressway (Rongcheng, Shandong–Wuhai, Inner Mongolia)
- G20 Qingyin Expressway (Qingdao–Yinchuan, Ningxia)

Spur Route: G2011 Qingxin Expressway (Qingdao–Xinhe, Pingdu, Shandong)

- G22 Qinglan Expressway (Qingdao–Lanzhou, Gansu)

These provincial expressways begin in or pass through Qingdao. Expressways that begin in Qingdao are in Bold:

- S16 Rongwei Expressway (Rongcheng–Weifang)
- S19 Longqing Expressway (Longkou–Qingdao)
- S21 Xinwei Expressway (Xinhe–Weifang)
- S24 Weiqing Expressway (Weihai–Qingdao)

Other than Expressways, there are also National Highways that pass through or begin in Qingdao. National Highways that begin in Qingdao are in bold:

- G204 (Yantai–Shanghai)
- G206 (Yantai–Shantou)
- G308 (Qingdao–Shijiazhuang)
- G309 (Rongcheng–Lanzhou)

==== Haiwan Bridge ====
On 30 June 2011, the longest bridge over water opened in Qingdao. The bridge, Haiwan Bridge, is 26.4 miles (42.5 km) long and connects Qingdao to Huangdao and Hongdao. The bridge is almost three miles (4.8 km) longer than the previous record-holder, the Lake Pontchartrain Causeway in the American state of Louisiana. Haiwan Bridge is supported by more than 5,000 pillars and costs about 10 billion yuan which is about 1.5 billion dollars. The bridge was designed by the Shandong Gausu Group and the construction lasted for four years. Haiwan Bridge cut the commute between the city of Qingdao and the sprawling suburb of Huangdao by 30 minutes. At least 10,000 workers toiled in two teams around the clock to build the bridge, which was constructed from opposite ends.

On the same day, the Jiaozhou Bay Tunnel opened. The tunnel brought much convenience to people by supporting public buses and making transport between the two areas more convenient.

=== Marine ===
Qingdao (official name: Qingdao port international co. ltd.) hosts one of the world's busiest seaports. Cooperative relations have been established with 450 ports in 130 countries worldwide. The port of Qingdao is part of the 21st Century Maritime Silk Road. In 2003, the annual cargo handling capacity exceeded 100 million tons for the first time. The number of containers reached 3.41 million twenty-foot equivalent units (TEU) of cargoes.

By 2011, the port had become the world's sixth-busiest by Total Cargo Volume, having handled 372,000,000 metric tons (366,000,000 long tons; 410,000,000 short tons) of cargo in that year. As of 2016, it was the 8th in the world in terms of TEUs (Twenty Foot Equivalent Units).

The Orient Ferry connects Qingdao with Shimonoseki, Japan. There are two ferry lines connecting Qingdao with South Korea. The New Golden Bridge II operates between Qingdao and Incheon, and the Blue Sea Ferry operates between Qingdao and Gunsan.

Qingdao port also includes a number of large adjacent ports including Dongjiakou.

=== Aviation ===
Qingdao Jiaodong International Airport, located 39 km (24 mi) away from the city center, is served by 13 domestic and international airlines that operate 94 routes, 12 of which are international and regional. The airport opened on August 12, 2021, as a replacement for Qingdao Liuting International Airport.

=== Intercity rail ===
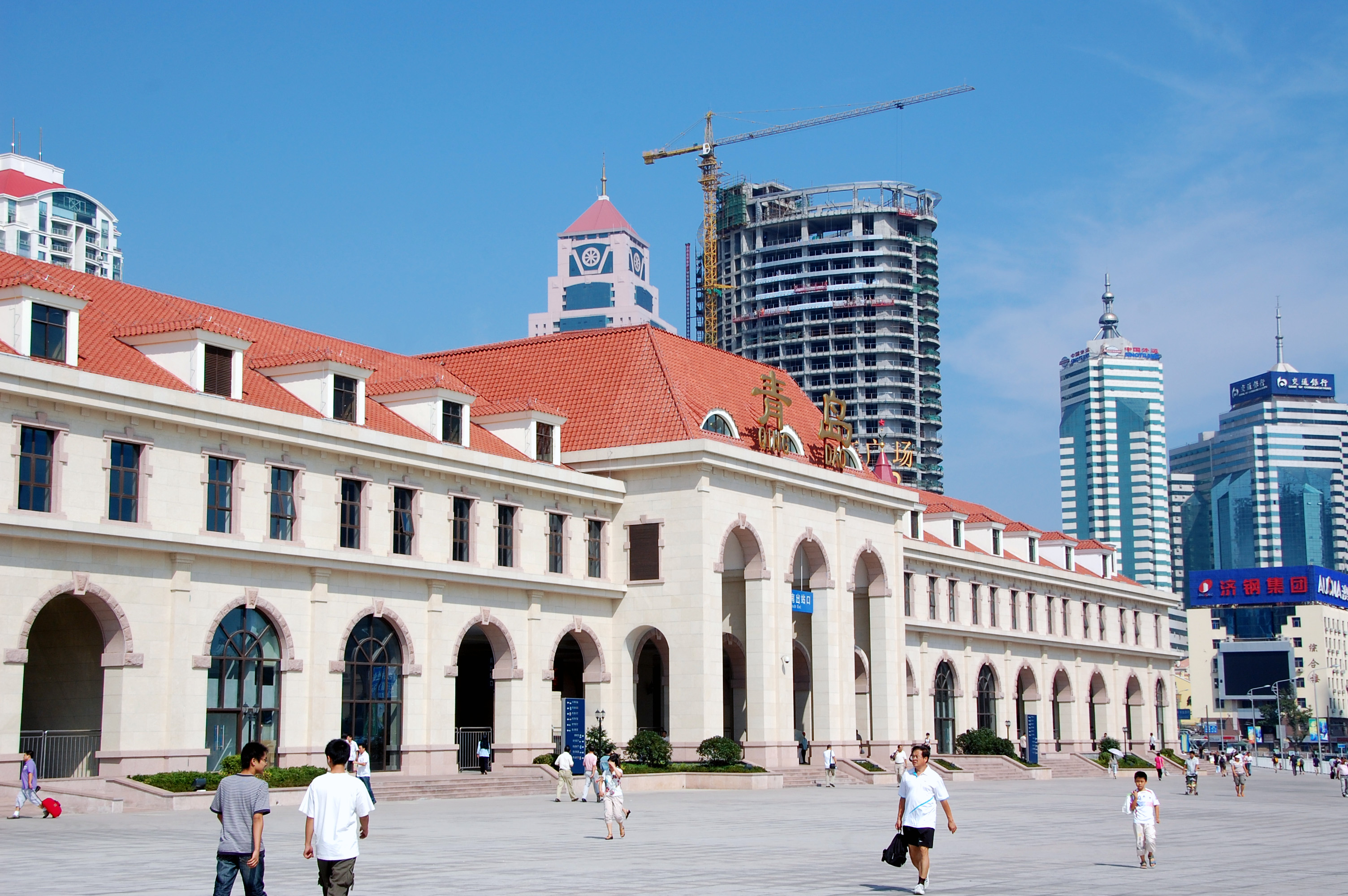
Qingdao railway station

Qingdao's railway development picked up during the late 1990s. It is at the start of the Jinan–Qingdao high-speed railway, the Qingdao–Jinan passenger railway and the original Qingdao–Jinan railway. Qingdao's city proper has some major railway stations, including Qingdao railway station, Cangkou railway station, Dagang railway station and Qingdao North railway station. Sifang railway station is now closed to passengers.

D and G series high-speed trains travel on the Jinan–Qingdao high-speed railway and reach speeds of 300 km/h (190 mph) on the Jinan-Qingdao Section. Services go to Beijing, Shanghai, Hefei, Jinan and Tianjin. The fastest train between Qingdao and Beijing is G206 / G205, which takes 2 hours and 58 minutes.

Domestic rail lines connect Qingdao with many cities in China, including Beijing, Lanzhou, Chengdu, Xi'an, Zhengzhou, Jinan and Jining.

=== Public transport ===
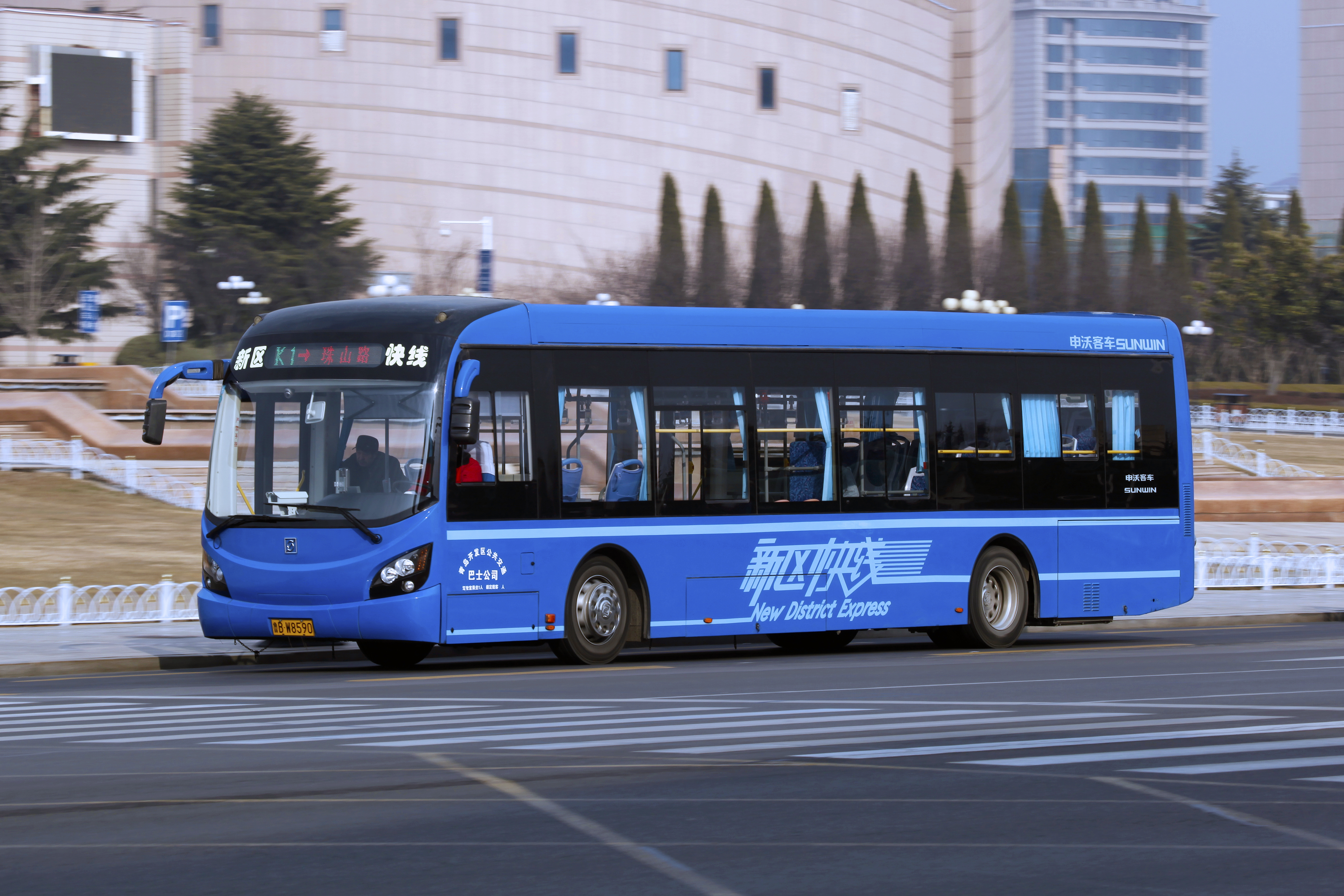
A Qingdao bus

Qingdao's public traffic owns 5283 large and medium-sized buses, CNG buses as of 2012. There are also 136 trolleybuses as of 2012. All of the buses and trolleybuses can be accessed using the Qingdao Public Traffic IC Card (青岛卡), which uses radio frequencies so the card does not have to physically touch the scanner. After that, all public transportation companies use Qingdaotong Card, the last company that started to use this card is the Zhenqing bus company located in The West Coast New Area of Qingdao (original Huangdao Distinct) in 2019.

Non air-conditioned buses cost 1 yuan (excluding the tunnel bus), The volume of road passenger transport approaches 737 million per year. The Public Transport Brand of 'Ri-Xin Bus (日新巴士)' is also known in China.

There are several taxi companies in Qingdao including Yiqing Company, Zhongqing Company, Jiaoyun Company, and, Huaqing Company.

==== Metro ====
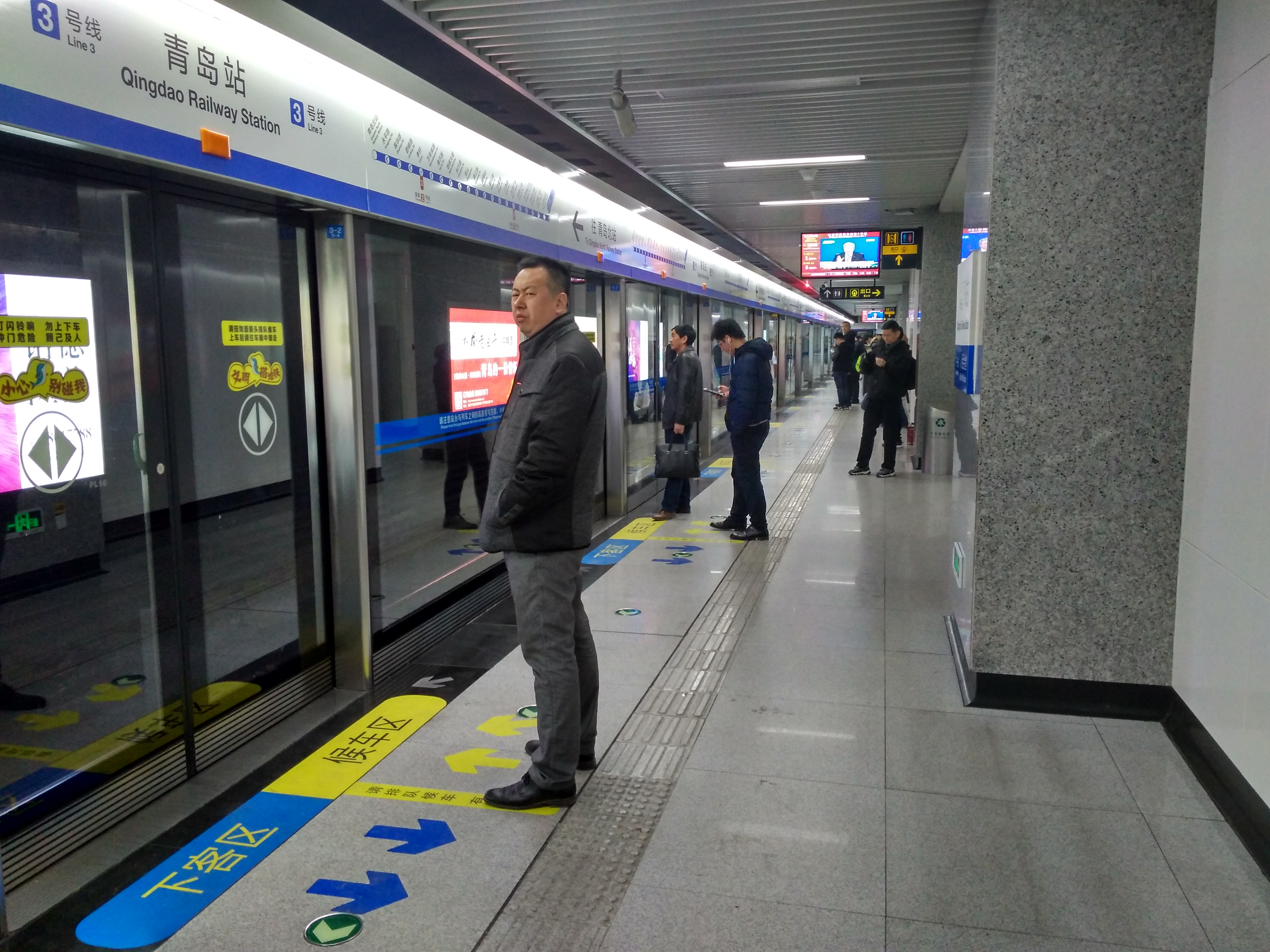
Platform of Qingdao Metro

After getting the approval from the State Council, the government announced on 18 August 2009 that Qingdao is ready to spend more than 29 billion yuan ($4.2 billion) before 2016 on its subway construction. Construction of 54.7 km (34.0 mi) of subway line 3 was completed before 2016 with a total investment of 29.2 billion yuan ($4.3 billion). Metro Line 3 is the first line in function and opened on 16 December 2015. In the long term, the city plans to build eight subway lines in downtown and some suburban districts, which account for 231.5 km (143.8 mi) in future. The system has an operating length of 243 km (151 mi), lines in operation including Line 1, Line 2, Line 3, Line 4, Line 6, Line 8, the Oceantec Valley Line, and the West Coast Line.

As of February 24, 2023, according to the approved network plan of Qingdao City, there are 19 long-term plans for Qingdao Metro, with a total length of 872 kilometers; The third phase construction plan has been approved, with a total of 13 lines and a total length of 503 kilometers, ranking ninth in the national approved mileage level; Seven lines have been opened and operated, including Lines 1, 2, 3, 4, 8, 11, and 13, with an operating mileage of 315 kilometers. As of March 2023, there are 146 operating stations, ranking tenth in China and second in northern cities; There are 10 lines under construction (including extension lines), including the West Extension and Phase II of Line 2, Line 5, Phase I and Phase II of Line 6, Phase II of Line 7, South Section and Branch of Line 8, Phase I of Line 9, and Phase I of Line 15. The total length under construction is 188 kilometers, and it is expected to be fully completed by 2028.

==== Tramway ====
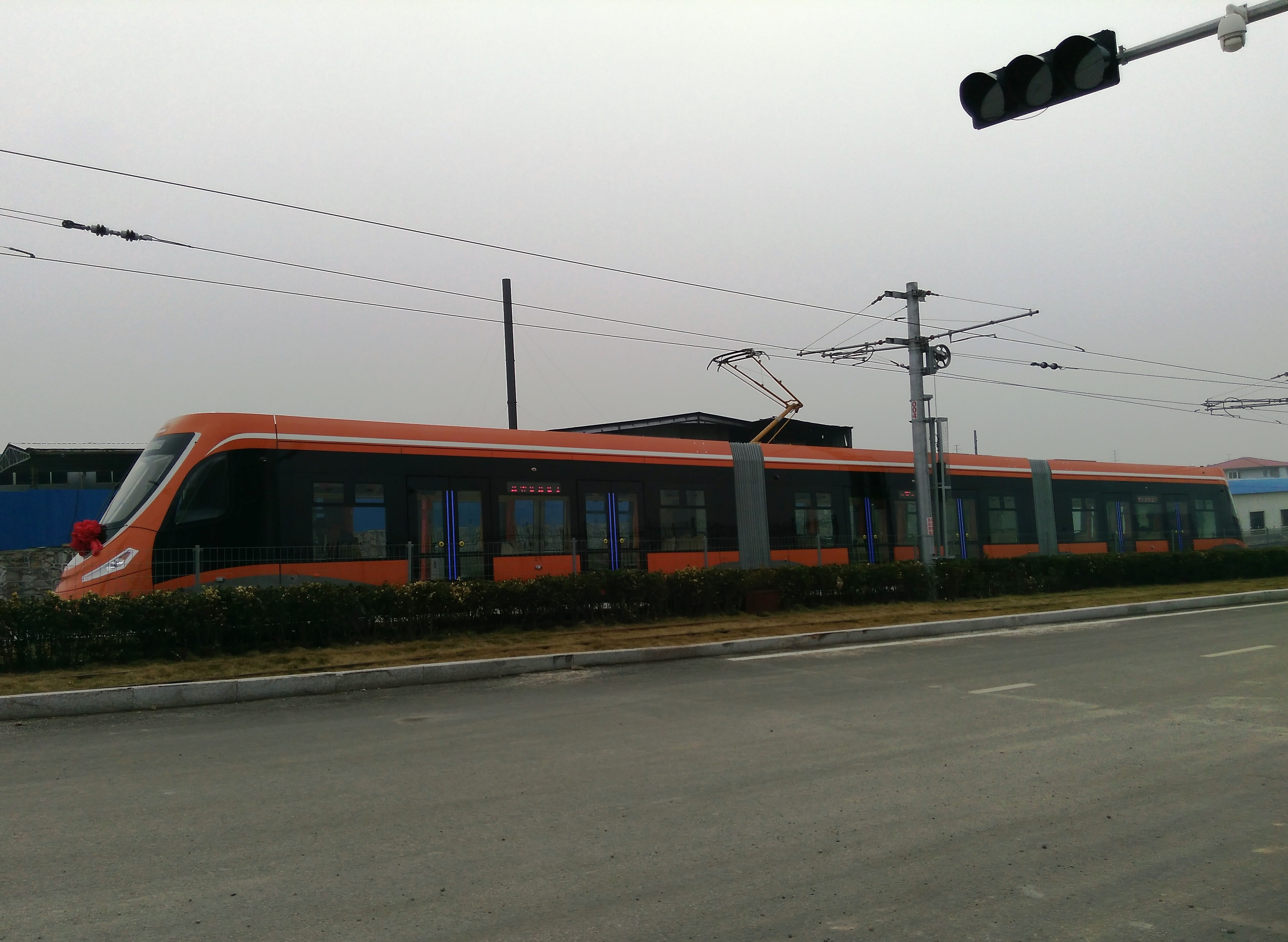
The Qingdao Tram system is operating in Chengyang District

The Qingdao Tram (official name: Modern tram demonstration line) of Chengyang District, Qingdao, is a tram system operating in Chengyang District, Qingdao, China. It opened in 2016. The Qingdao Public Transport Group Rail Bus Co., Ltd. is responsible for operation and management. The system is only composed of 1 tram line.

== Culture ==
=== Architecture ===
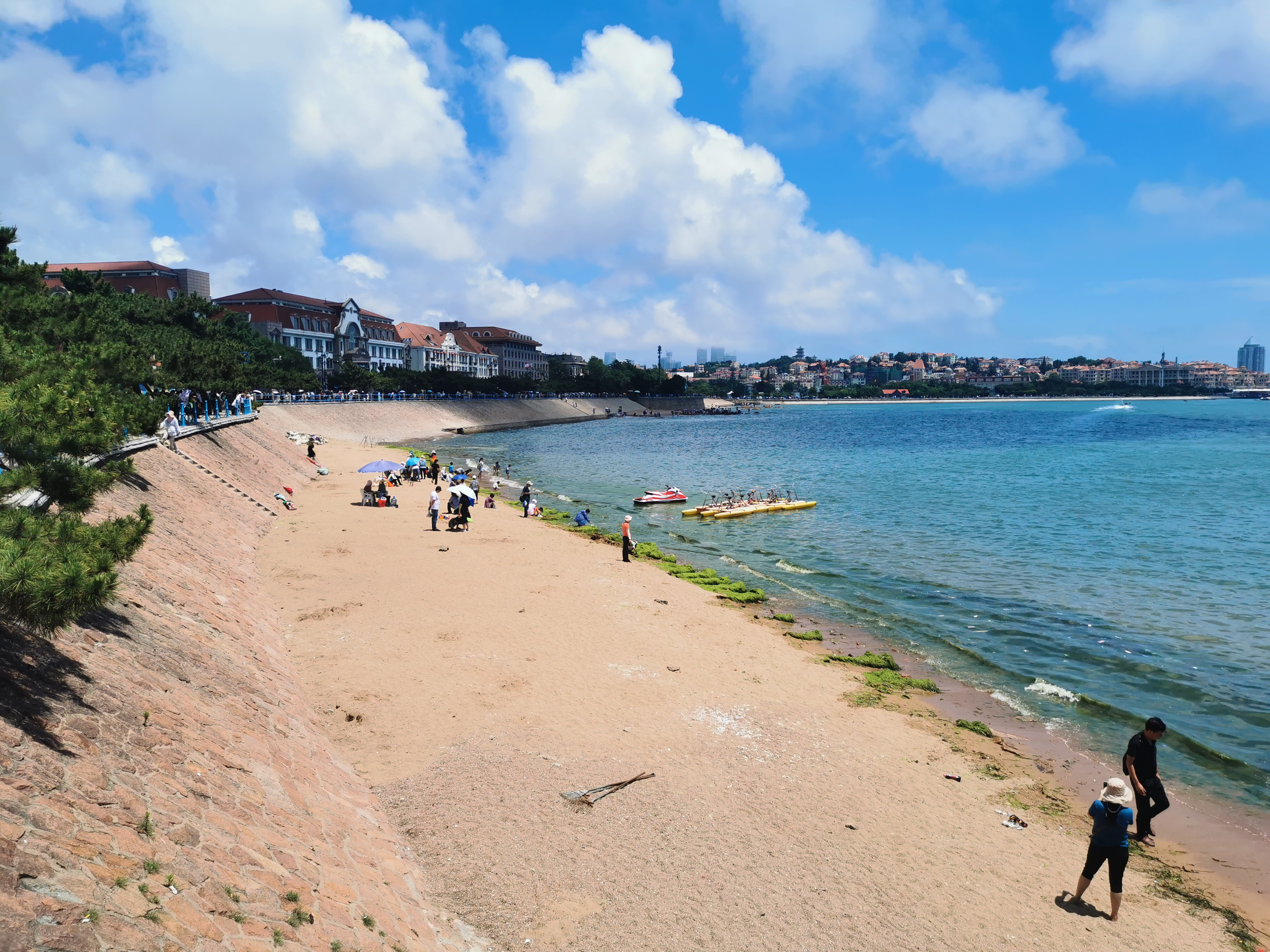
Qingdao retains many buildings with a German architectural style

There are a large number of German-style buildings in Qingdao's city center, a remarkable fact considering the German leased-territory period only lasted 16 years (1898–1914). The unique combination of German and Chinese architecture therein, combined with German demographic roots and a large Korean expatriate population, gives Qingdao a rather distinct atmosphere. An old saying described Qingdao as a city of "red tiles green trees, blue sky, and blue sea." A larger number of areas in former foreign styles are well preserved. Although the new city area is under large-scale reconstruction, the old city area (especially the western part of Shinan District) still retains many traditional buildings.

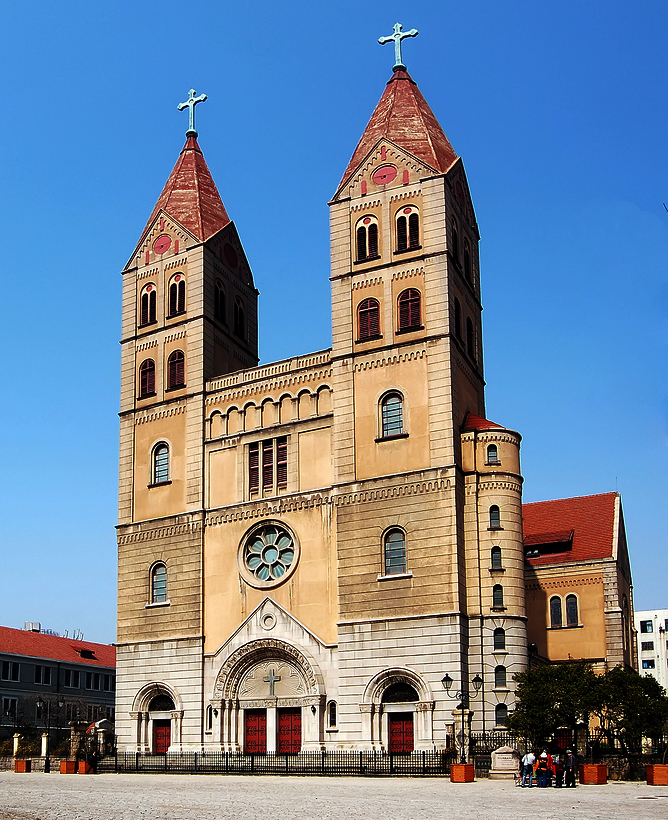
St. Michael's Cathedral

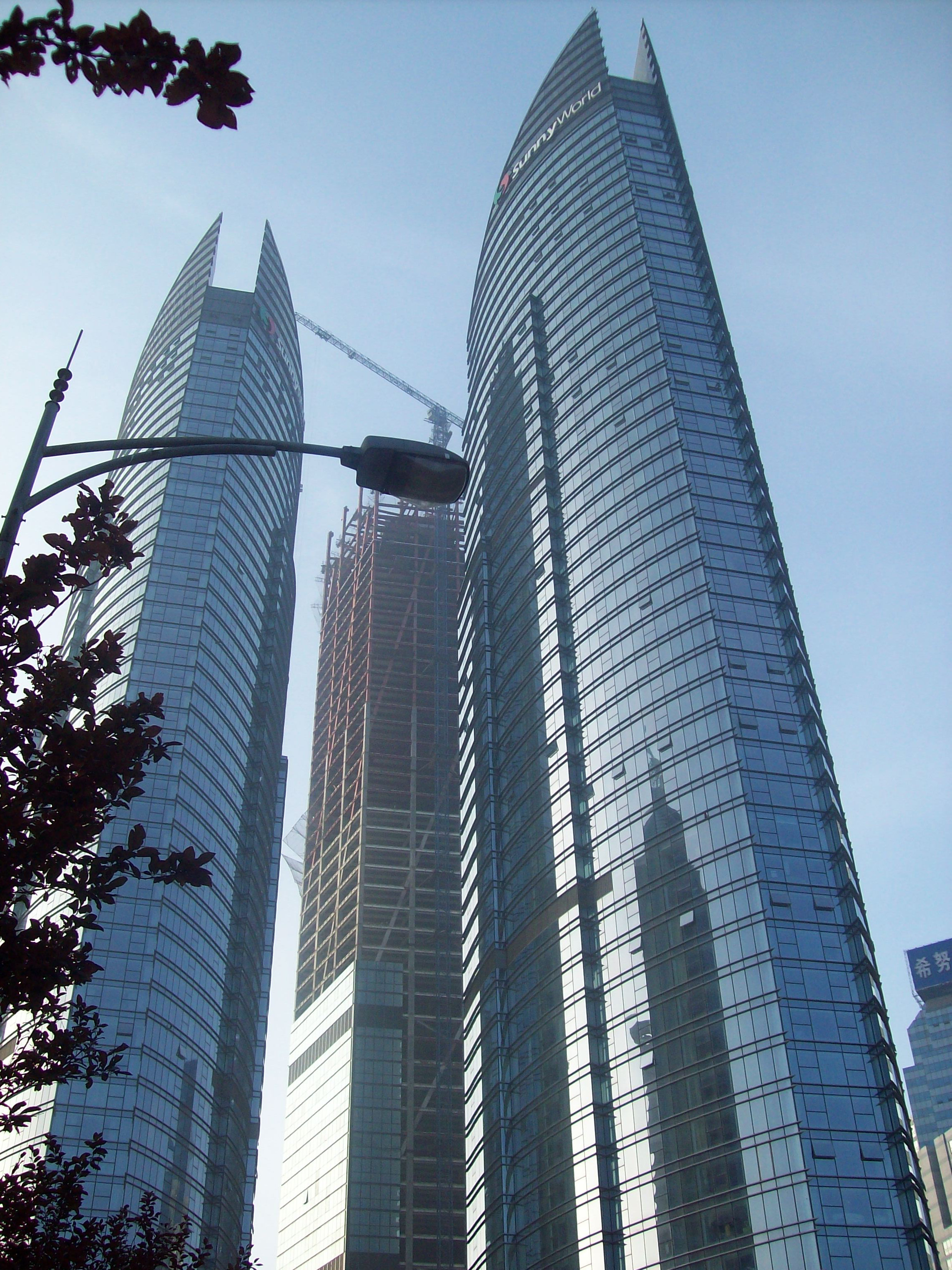
Skyscrapers in Qingdao

=== Notable people ===
- Long Ding, American football kicker
- James R. Lilley, U.S. diplomat
- Ma Jian (马建)
- Ma Jun (马军)
- Xiao Hong (萧红)
- Xiao Jun (萧军)
- Duanmu Hongliang (端木蕻良)
- Zou Chenglu (邹承鲁) was born in Qingdao
- Erin Pizzey, (was born in Qingdao)
- Li Zhaoxing (李肇星)
- Zhang Ruimin (张瑞敏)
- Victoria Song (宋茜, f(x))
- Huang Zitao (黄子韬, musician, actor)
- Huang Bo (黄渤)
- Zhang Jike (张继科)
- Gao Fenghan (高凤翰)
- Toshiro Mifune (was born in Qingdao)
- Li Cunxin (李存信)
- Huang Xiaoming (黄晓明)
- Chen Hao (陈好)
- Xia Yu (夏雨)
- Fan Bingbing (范冰冰, born in Qingdao)
- Fan Chengcheng (范丞丞, Fan Bingbing's younger brother)
- Bai Baihe (白百合)
- Hao Haidong (郝海东)
- Wang Dong (王栋, midfielder for Qingdao Huanghai)
- Bu Xiangzhi (卜祥志, chess grandmaster)
- Zhang Juanjuan (张娟娟, archer)
- Malcolm H. Wiener, (was born in Qingdao)
- Ni Ping (倪萍)
- Tang Guoqiang (唐国强)
- Ren Jialun (任嘉伦)
- Chen Meng (陈梦)

=== Movies shot in Qingdao ===
- A Little Red Flower (送你一朵小红花 2020) 2020
- A Better Tomorrow 2018 (英雄本色2018) 2016
- The Great Wall (长城) 2016
- Underdog Fight (硬汉) 2008
- Underdog Fight II (硬汉 II) 2013
- Ocean Heaven (海洋天堂) 2010
- Beauty Remains (美人依旧) 2005
- The Wandering Earth 2 (流浪地球2) 2023

=== Language ===
During the city's leased-territory days, German, the official language, was rigorously taught and promoted. Since the demise of Germany's colonial empire after World War I, the German language is all but gone, leaving little impact on the local languages. A local accent known as Qingdao dialect (Chinese: 青岛话; pinyin: Qīngdǎo huà) distinguishes the residents of the city from those of the surrounding Shandong province. Due to the efforts by the city government to promote standard Mandarin, most educated people can speak standard Mandarin in addition to their native dialect. With reform policies and English teaching, some young citizens have been taught English and many can converse with English-speaking foreigners. Business and traffic signs in English are becoming more and more common.

=== Festivals ===
Since 1991, the Qingdao International Beer Festival has been held annually in the city every August/September.

Other notable festivals include the Qingdao International Horticultural Exposition, a major international fair which was held in the city in 2014.

== Media ==
Qingdao previously had a large German community and a German garrison, so three German newspapers operated in Qingdao. German papers included Deutsch-Asiatische Warte (traditional Chinese: 泰東古今鑑; simplified Chinese: 泰东古今鉴; pinyin: Tàidōng Gǔjīn Jiàn; weekly newspaper published until 1906, included Die Welt des Ostens, Altes und Neues aus Asiens drei Kaiserreichen, a cultural supplement), the Tsingtauer Neueste Nachrichten and the Kiautschou Post (a daily paper published from 1908 to 1912, referring to the Kiautschou (Jiaozhou) Bay concession). German publishing in Qingdao ended after World War I and the beginning of the Japanese administration.

A 1912 publication of the United States Department of Commerce, Bureau of Foreign and Domestic Commerce said that the Tageblatt für Nordchina of Tianjin was read in Qingdao and that major newspapers from Shanghai were also read in Qingdao.

Bandao Broadcasting Media Corporation, a news and broadcasting agency was founded in 1999.

== Tourism ==
Qingdao attracts many tourists due to its seaside setting and temperate weather. Parks, beaches, sculptures, and unique German and modern architecture line the shore. Its centrally located tourist information center, the "Qingdao Information Center for International Visitors for International Visitors," is located on Middle Hong Kong Road (香港中路).

Qingdao's major attractions include:

=== Western Shinan district ===
- Zhan Qiao (Pier, Tsingtau Brücke; 栈桥)
- Little Qingdao Isle (Arcona Insel; 小青岛)
- Tian Hou Temple (天后宫), Qingdao Folk Museum
- Badaguan (八大关; 'Eight Great Passes'), the older area of town with some surviving German architecture.
- Lu Xun Park, named after Lu Xun, modern Chinese writer and critic, who lived and taught in the 1930s.
- Zhongshan Park, named after the style name 'Zhongshan' of Sun Yat-sen, a famous modern Chinese politician.
- Xiao Yu Shan (小鱼山; 'Little Fish Hill')
- The twin-spired St. Michael's Cathedral (Kathedrale St. Michael; 天主教堂), a notable example of Qingdao's famous Neo-romanesque architecture, designed by German architect Alfred Fräbel, completed in 1934.
- Qingdao Aquarium (青岛水族馆)
- Kiautschou Governor's Hall (Gouverneurspalast; 提督府), the office building of former German governors and former municipal government
- Xinhao Hill (信号山)
Photographs of Historic Eurasian Area
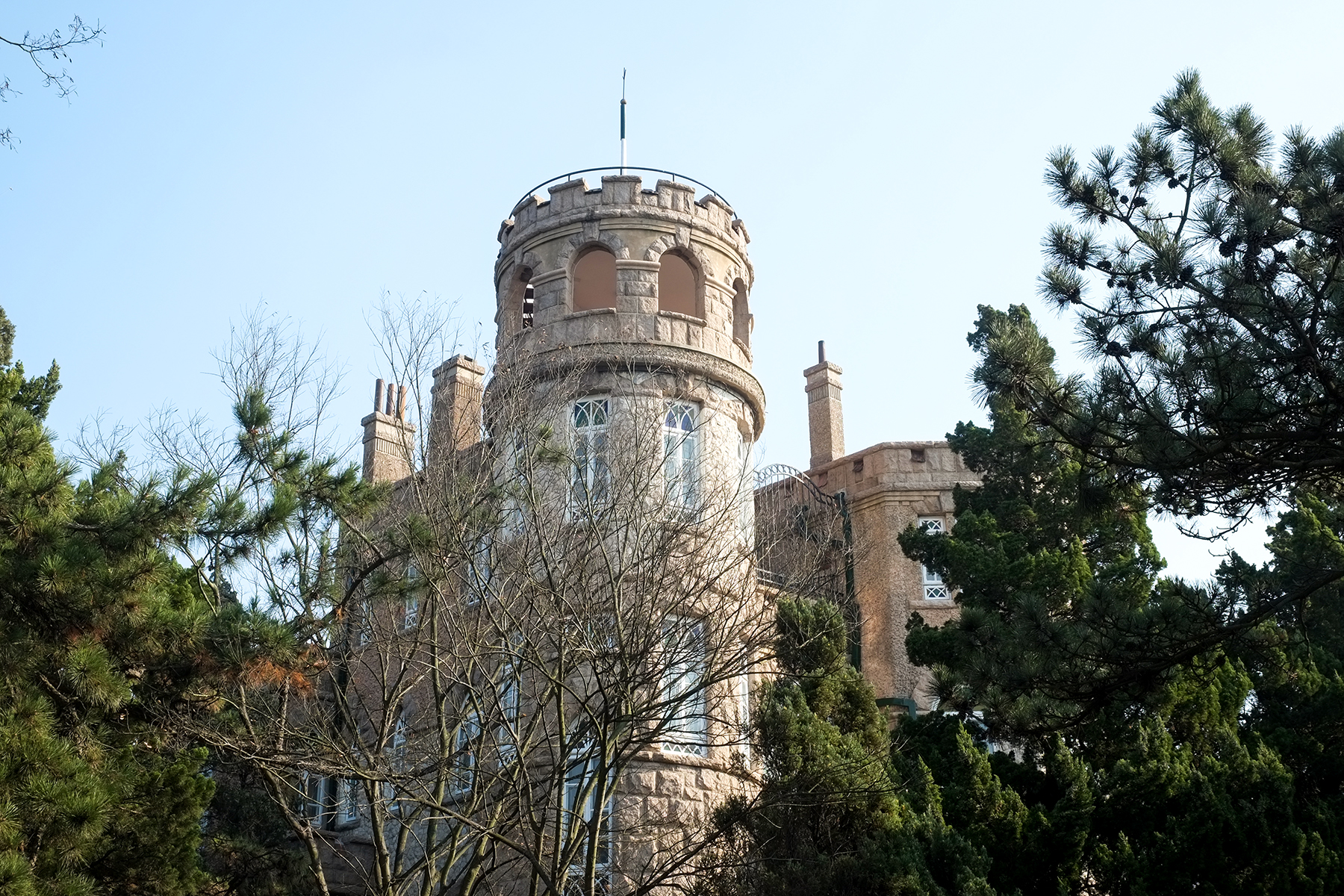
Hua Shi Lou in the Eight Great Passes

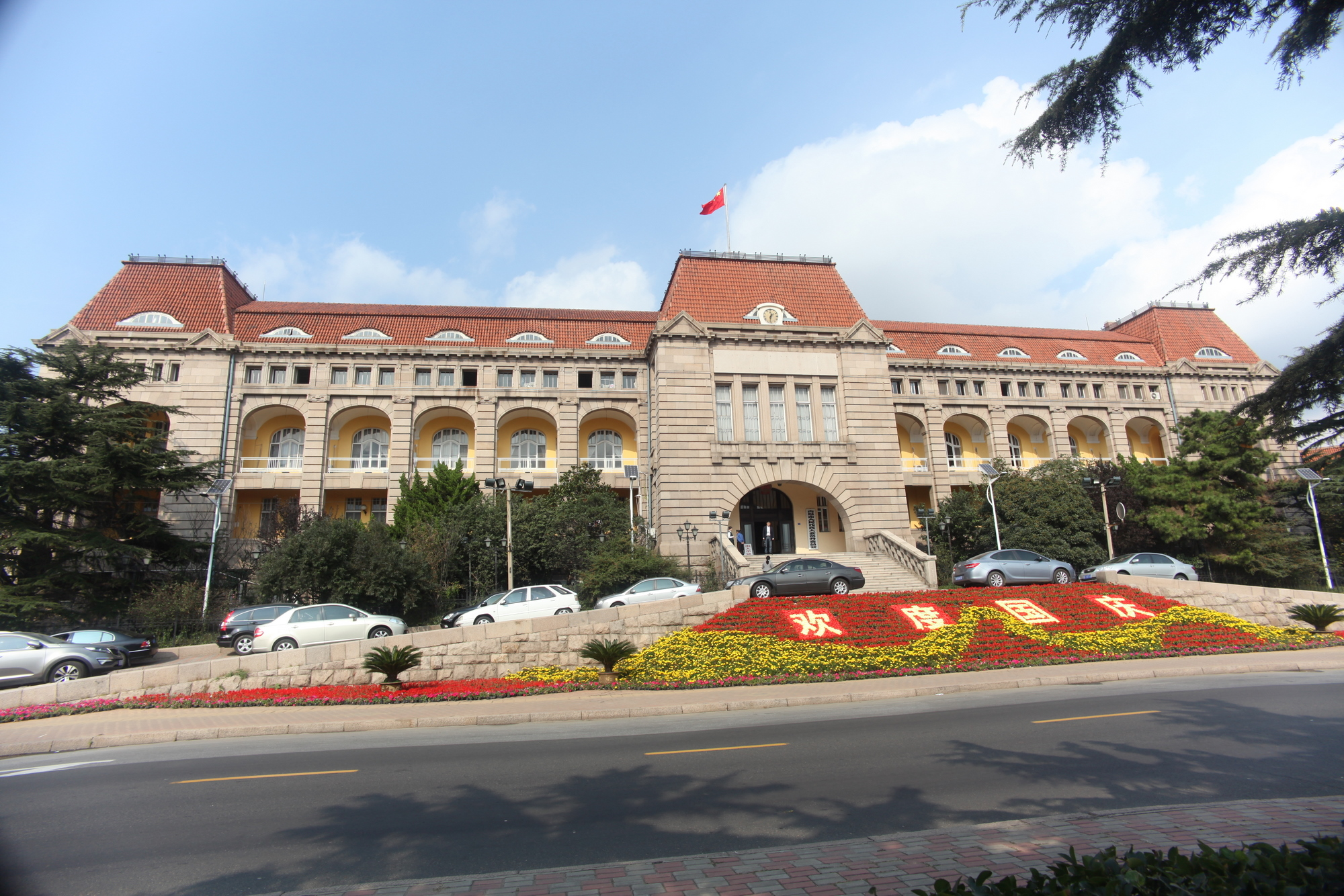
Former site of the headquarters of the German Administration

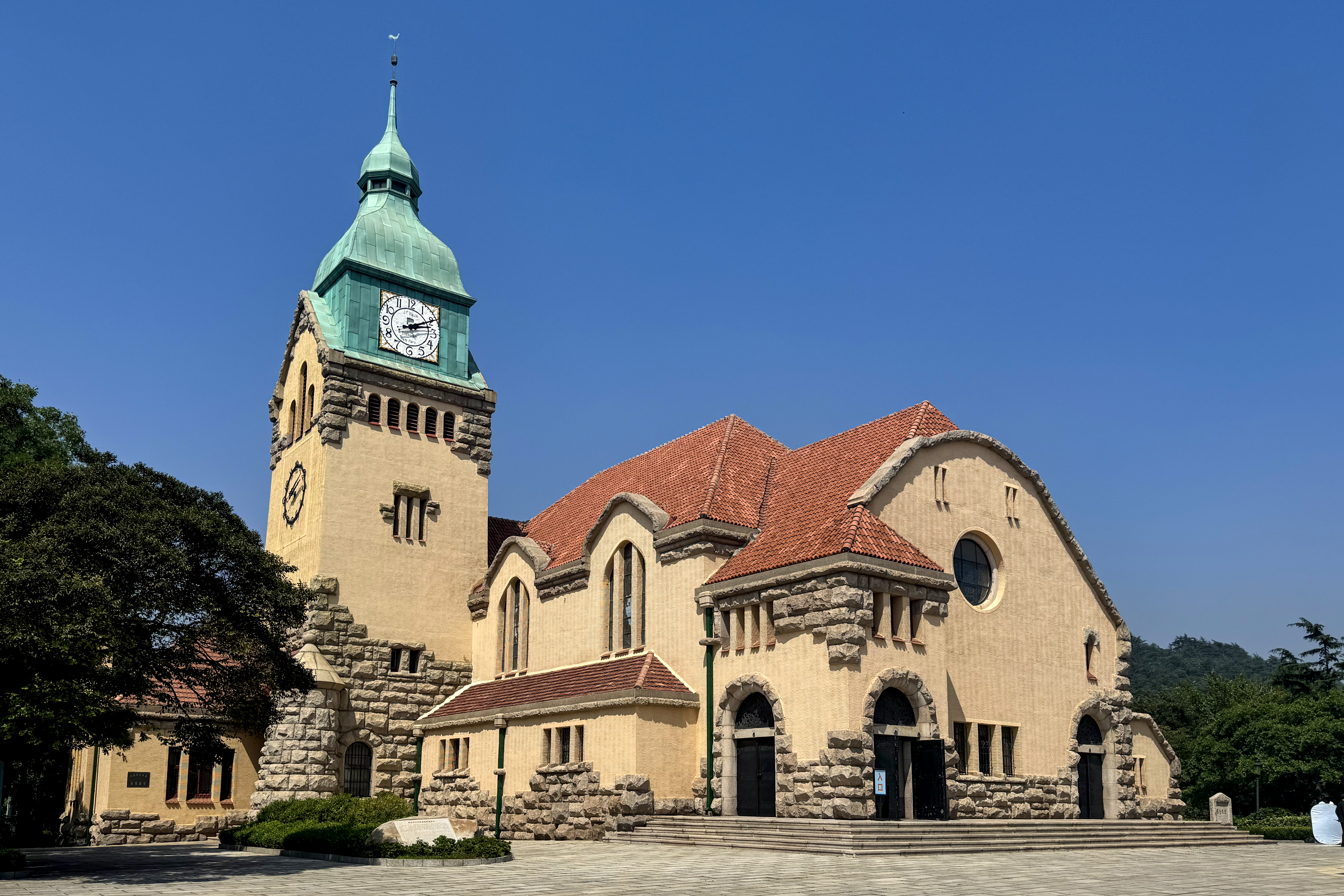
The Protestant Church (Evangelische Kirche; 基督教堂)

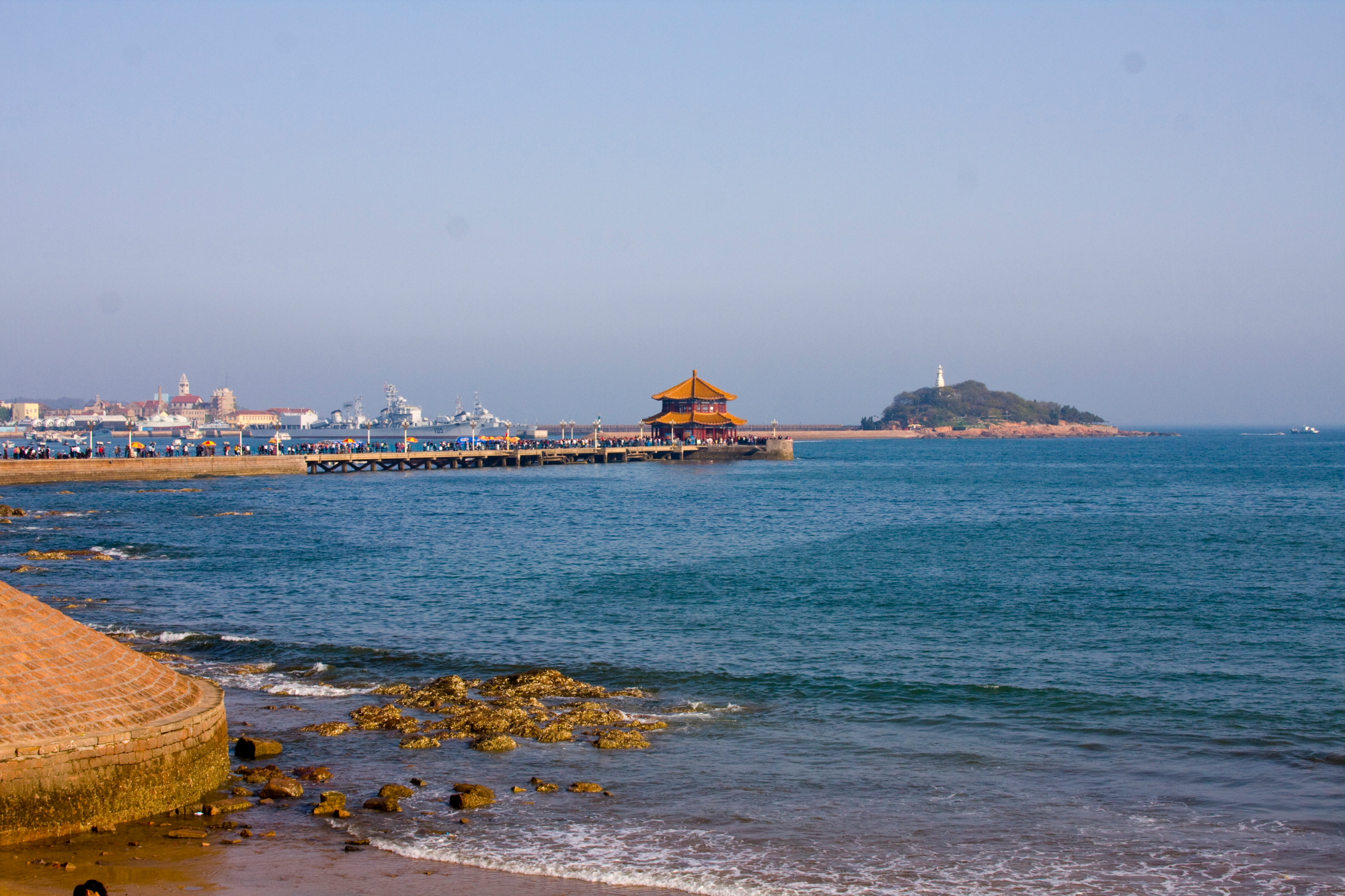
Zhanqiao Pier

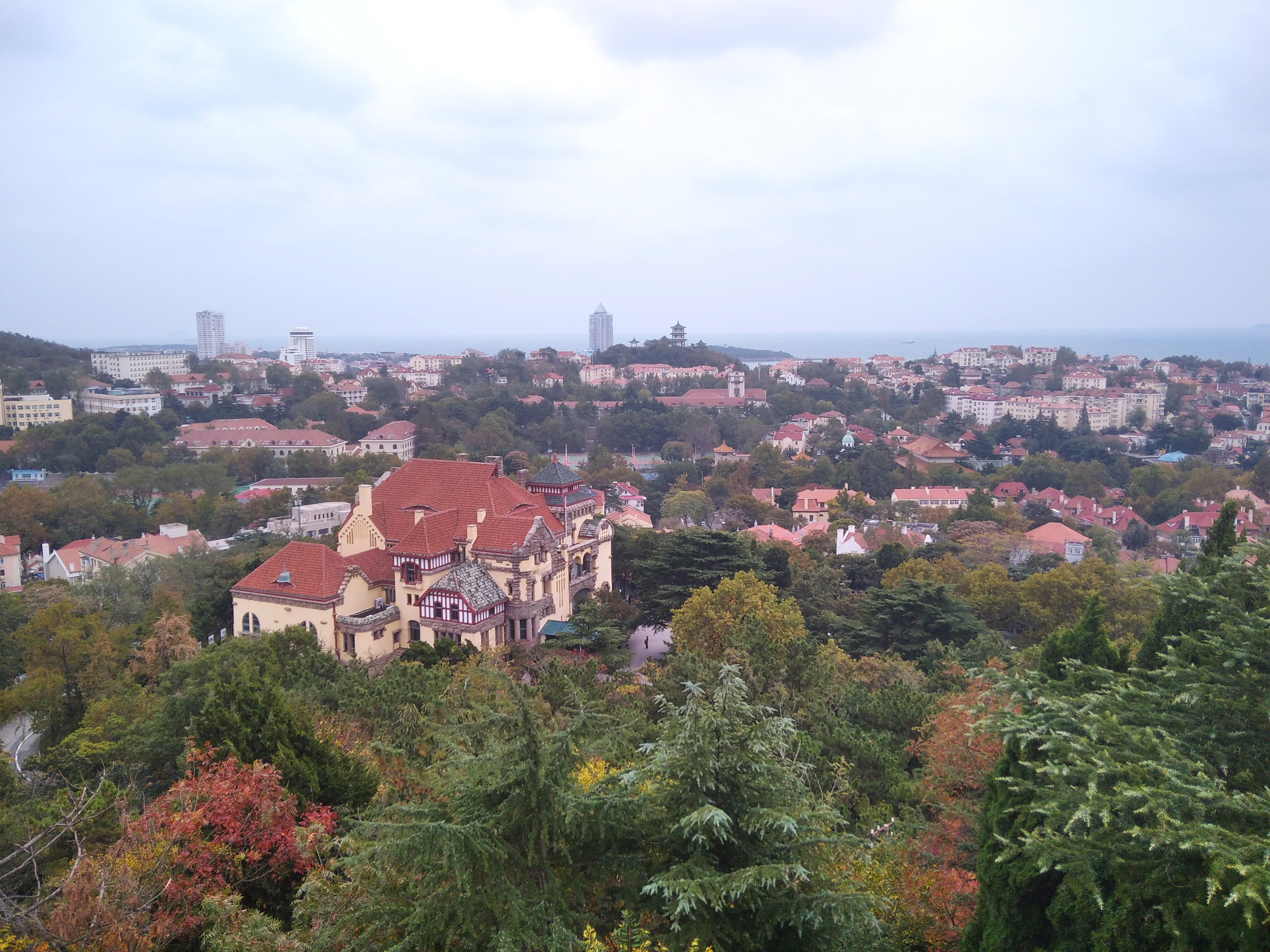
A view of Qingdao from Xinhao Hill with former German governor’s residence in foreground

=== Eastern Shinan district ===
- May Fourth Square (Platz des vierten Mai), coastal plaza with the Wind of May sculpture
- Tsingtao Brewery (Tsingtao-Brauerei), founded by Germany and the most exported beer from China.
- Zhanshan Temple (Dschanschan-Tempel), Qingdao's oldest Buddhist temple.
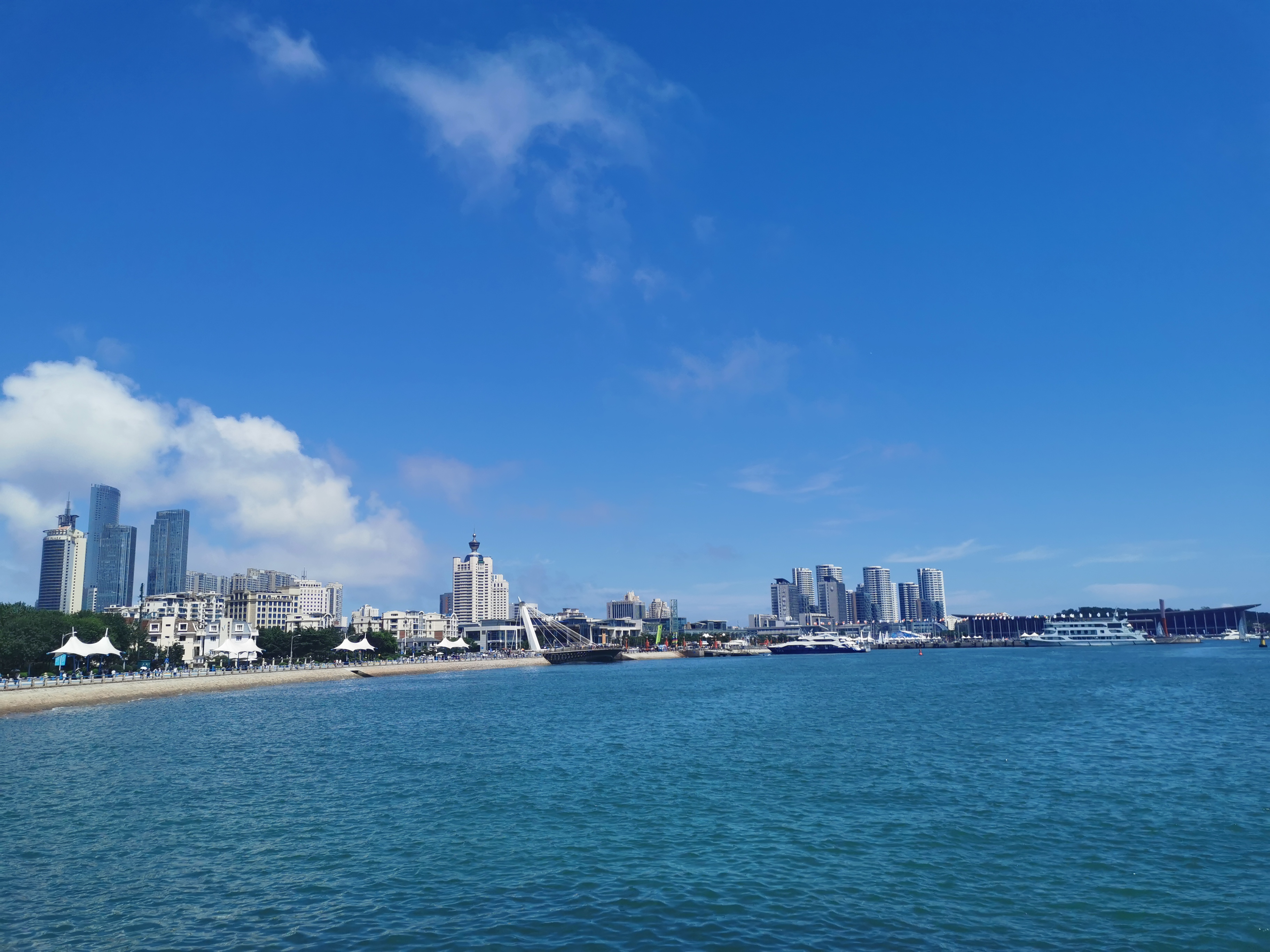
- Qingdao International Sailing Centre, 2021
  Qingdao International Sailing Centre (青岛奥林匹克帆船中心), hosted the Olympic and Paralympic Sailing competitions in 2008.

=== Laoshan district ===
- Lao Shan (Mount Lao, Lauschan, 崂山), 40 km (25 mi) east of Qingdao, the most famous Taoist mountain with Taoist retreat – Great Purity Palace (太清宫)
- National Shilaoren Tourist Resort (石老人国家旅游度假区), the famous bathing beach symbolized by a characteristic natural sea rock with a shape like an old man
- Xiaomaidao Park (小麦岛公园), the park with hills, a beach, and a nice view of the coastal line

== Education ==
Qingdao is also one of the world's top 35 cities for global scientific research as tracked by the Nature Index.

=== Higher education ===
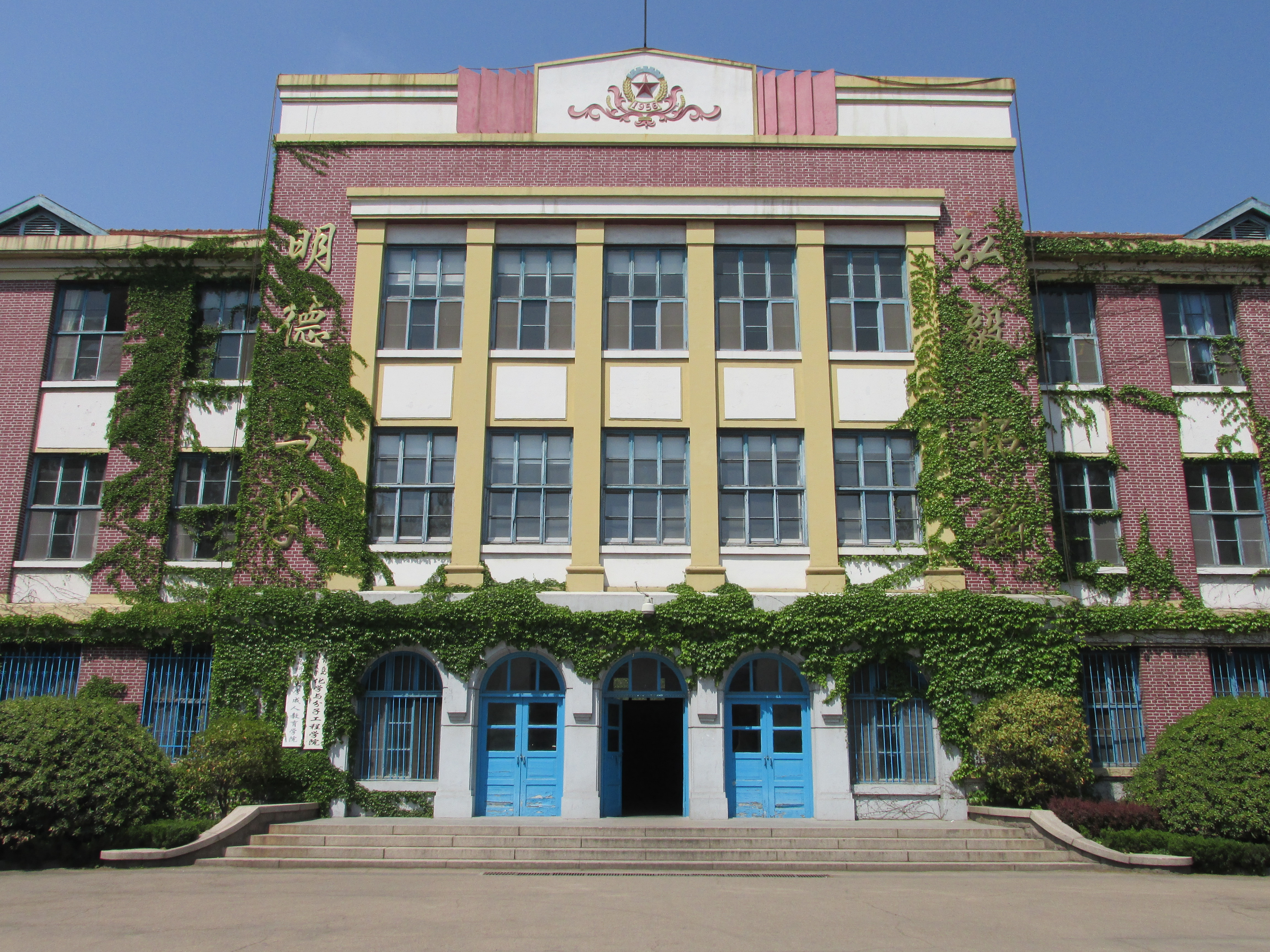
Old Main Building of Qingdao University of Science and Technology

Qingdao is home to a large number of higher education institutions. The Ocean University of China, formerly called the Ocean University of Qingdao, is the most important university of maritime sciences in China. In addition, the Qingdao University, the Qingdao University of Science and Technology as well as the Qingdao Technological University have also been integral parts of higher education in Qingdao for decades. Shandong University Qingdao (SDUQ) was established in 2016, belonging to Shandong University System. Other institutions include:

- China University of Petroleum, completed its relocation from Dongying to Qingdao in 2012
- Shandong University of Science and Technology, the main campus is based in Qingdao since 2003
- Qingdao Agricultural University, the main campus is based in Qingdao since 2007
- Qingdao Technical College
- Qingdao Binhai University, located at Huangdao.

Shandong University was located in Qingdao from 1909 to 1936. A new branch campus of the university is under construction in Aoshanwei Town, Jimo.

=== International schools ===
- Korean International School of Qingdao
- Malvern College Qingdao
- Pegasus California School, Qingdao
- International School of Qingdao
- Qingdao Amerasia International School
- Qingdao No.1 International School
- Qingdao Oxford International College
- Yew Chung International School of Qingdao
- Belt & Road Collaborative Innovation College (BRCIC)

=== Secondary schools ===
- Qingdao No. 2 High School
- Qingdao No. 58 School
- Qingdao No. 1 High School
- Qingdao No. 9 High School
- Qingdao No. 15 High School
- Qingdao No. 19 High School

== Sports ==
=== Stadiums ===
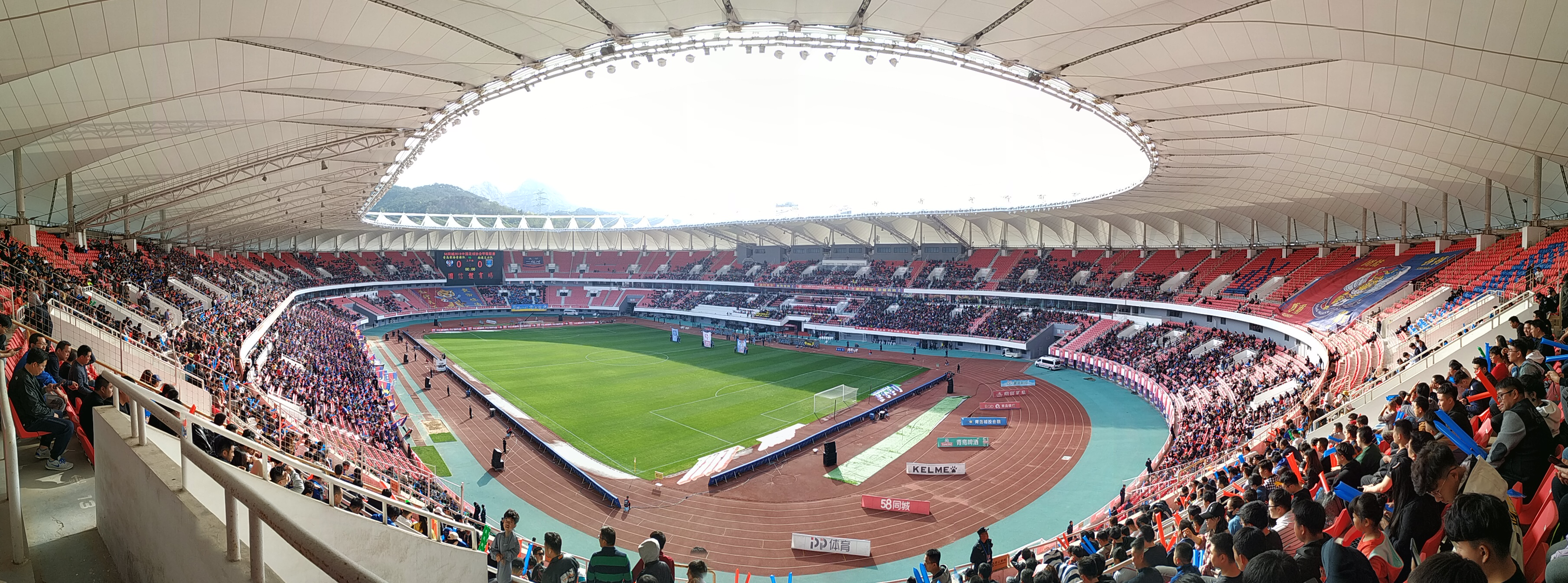
Qingdao Conson Stadium

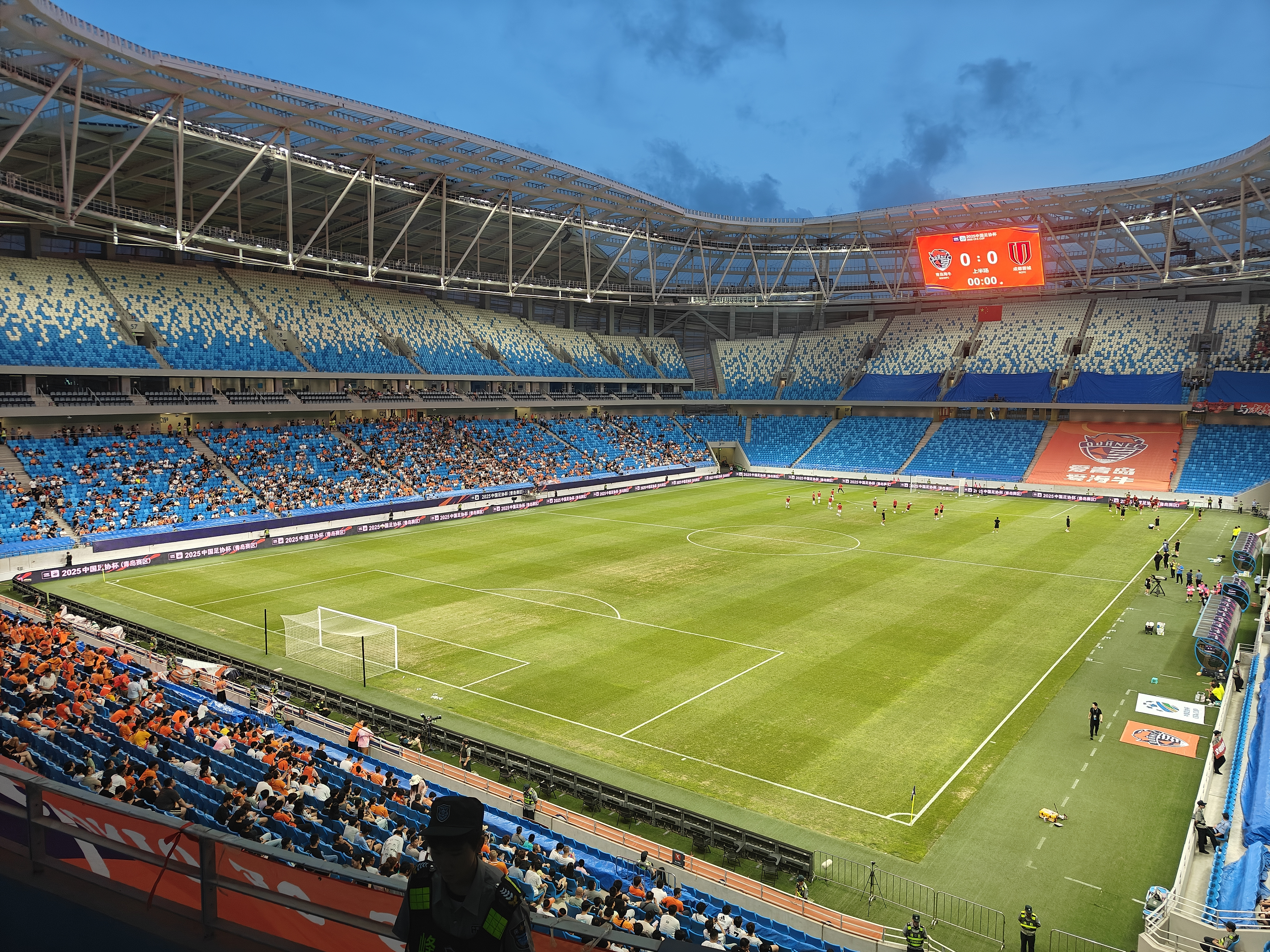
Qingdao Youth Football Stadium

- Guoxin Gymnasium (Qingdao city sports center)
- Yizhong Sports Center
- Qingdao Tiantai Stadium
- Hongcheng Stadium
- Qingdao Youth Football Stadium

=== 2008 Olympic Summer Games ===
During the 2008 Summer Olympics, Qingdao and Beijing cohosted the Olympic Sailing competitions. In Qingdao, the events took place along the shoreline by the city. These events were hosted at the Qingdao International Sailing Center at Fushan Bay, near the city's central business district. An international broadcasting center and purpose-built hotel were constructed for the Games.

=== Motorsport ===
The IndyCar Series signed a contract with the Qingdao city council to hold an IndyCar race in Qingdao in 2012. The subsequently canceled race was supposed to take place on a 6.23 km (3.87 mi) street circuit.

== Sister cities ==
Qingdao has 36 sister cities.

City	Country	Year of Agreement
Acapulco	Mexico	1985
Adelaide	Australia	2014
Bilbao	Spain	2004
Daegu	South Korea	1993
Faisalabad	Pakistan	2021
Iloilo City	Philippines	2003
Klaipėda	Lithuania	2004
Long Beach	United States	1985
Makassar	Indonesia	N/A
Mannheim	Germany	2016
Miami	United States	2005
Montevideo	Uruguay	2004
Nantes	France	2005
Nes Ziyyona	Israel	1997
North Shore City	New Zealand	2008
Odesa	Ukraine	1993
Paderborn	Germany	2003
Perm	Russia	2003
Puerto Montt	Chile	1999
Regensburg	Germany	2009
Richmond	Canada	2008
Saint Petersburg	Russia	2006
Shimonoseki	Japan	1979
Southampton	United Kingdom	1998
Velsen	Netherlands	1998
Vila Velha	Brazil	2009
Wilhelmshaven	Germany	1992
Yerevan	Armenia	2023

== See also ==
- List of twin towns and sister cities in China
- Shandong
- Qingdao Oriental Movie Metropolis
- New first-tier city
