= Shinan, Qingdao =

Shinan 市南区
- District
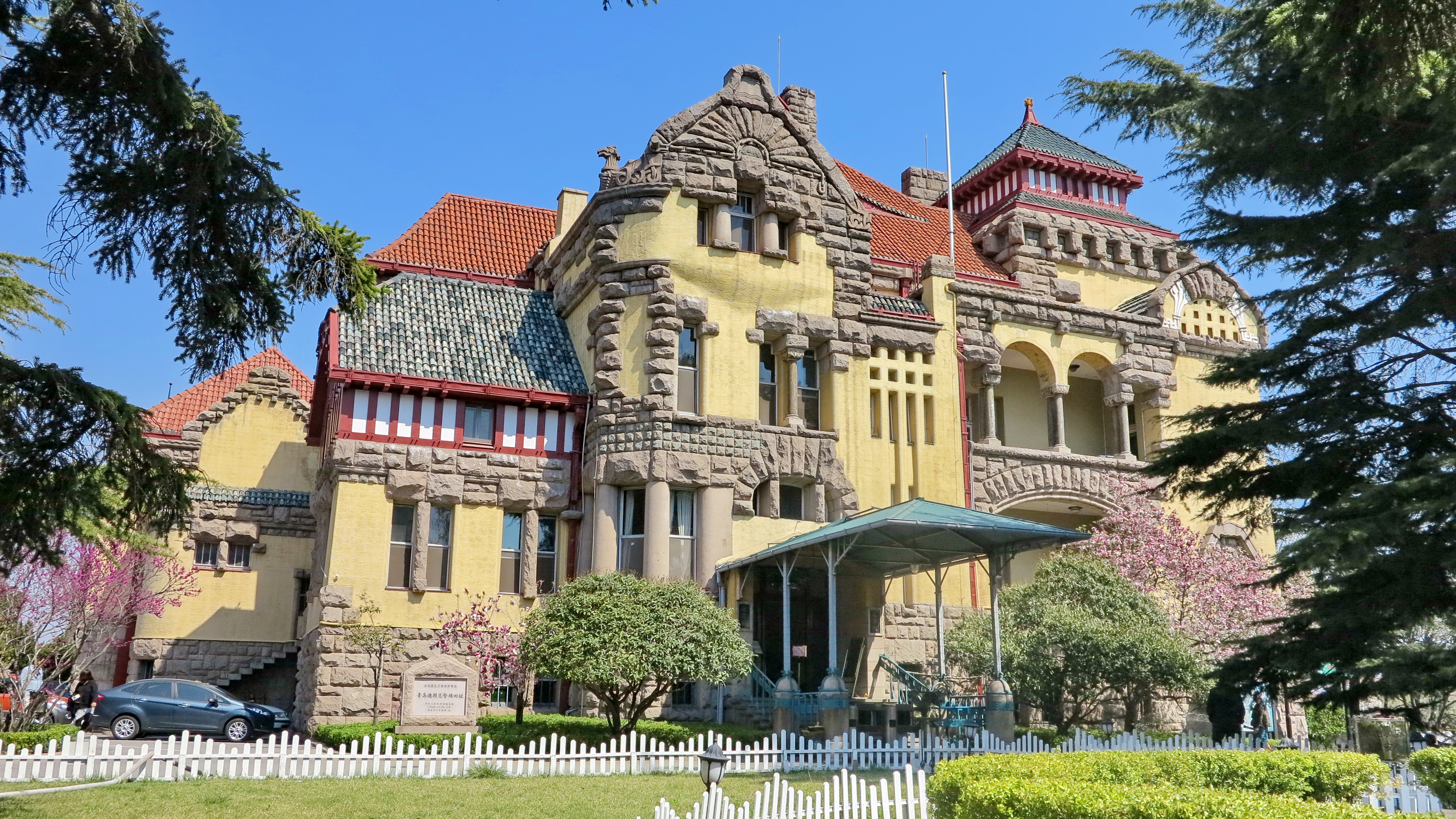
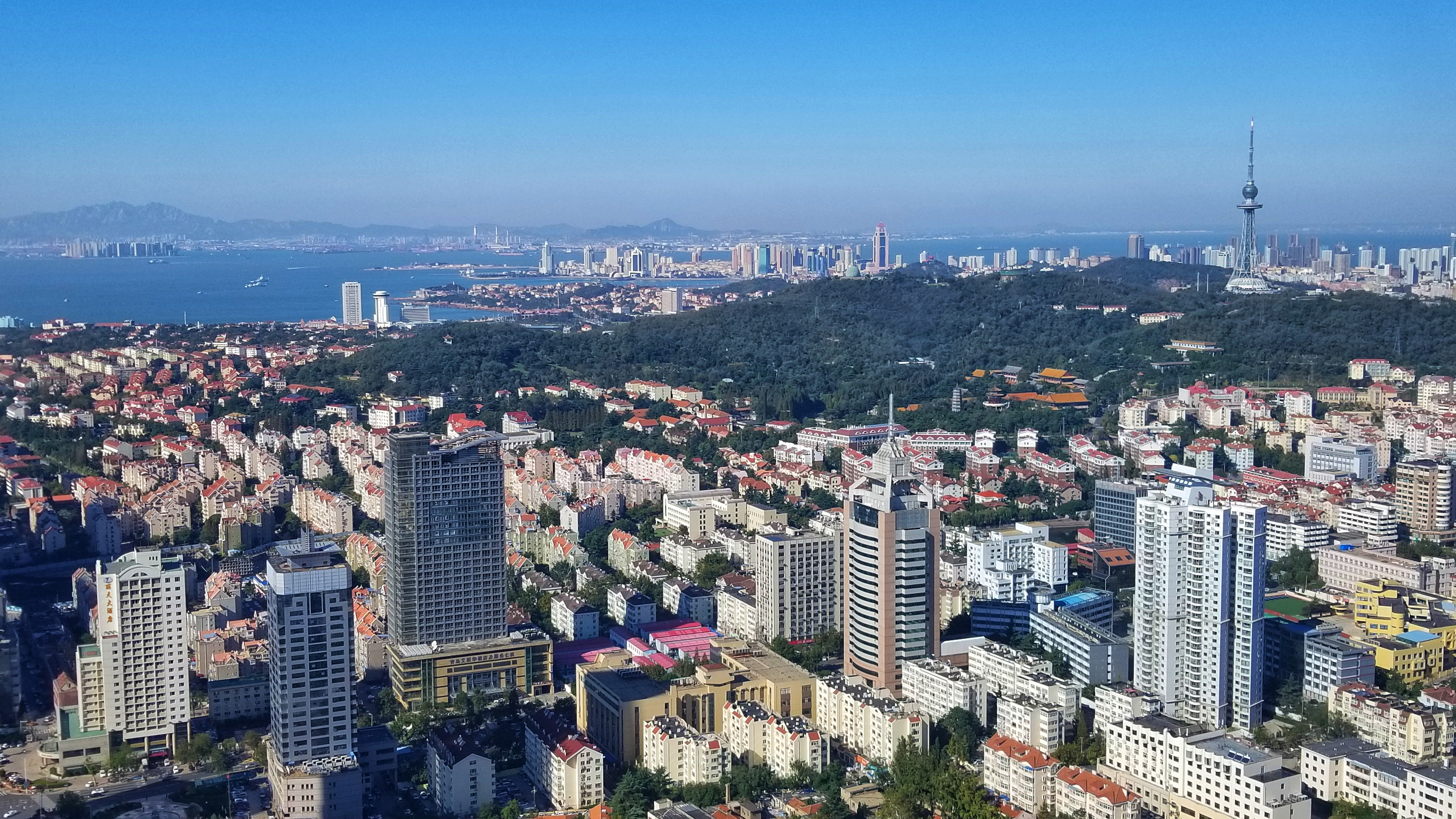
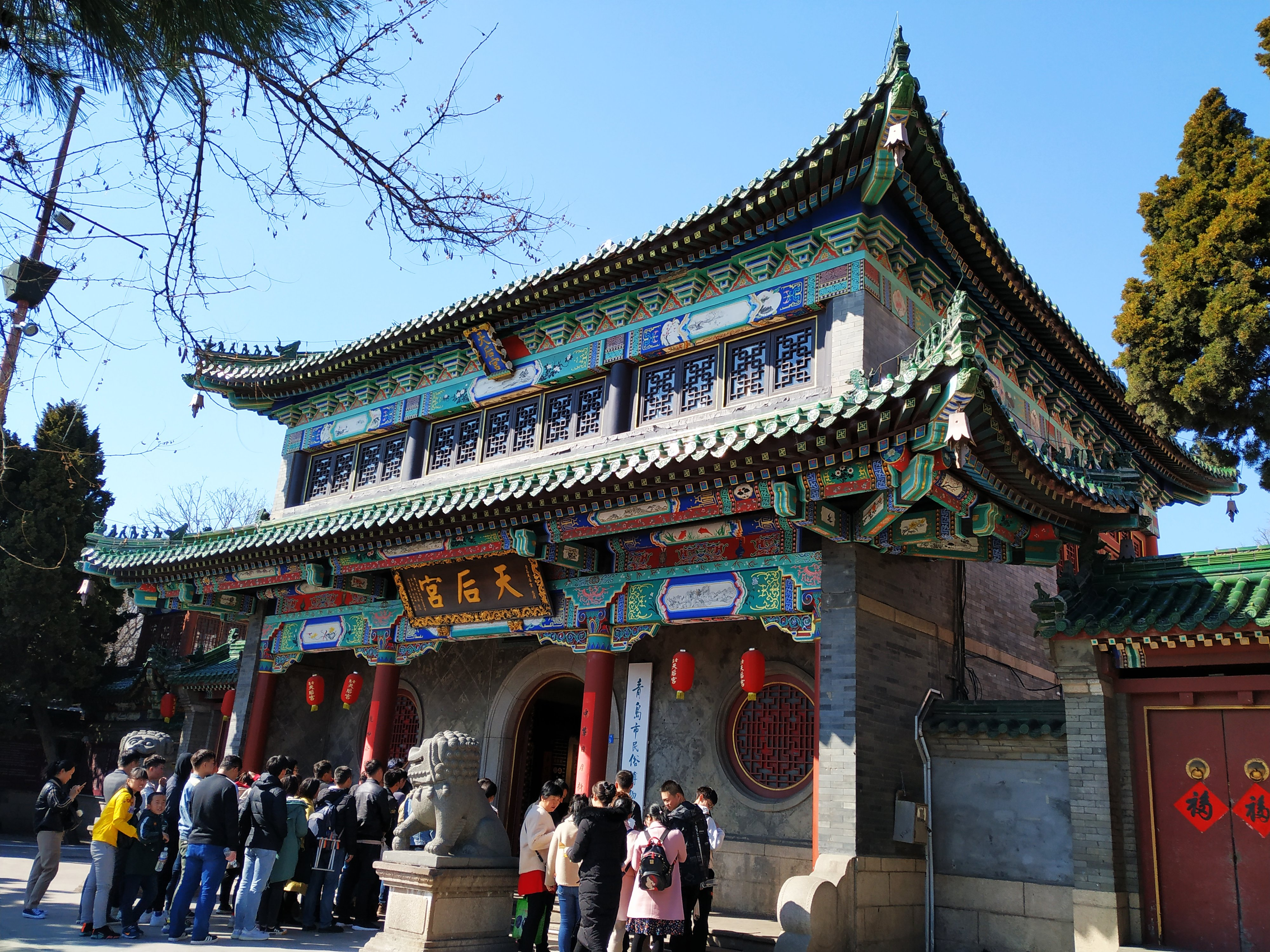
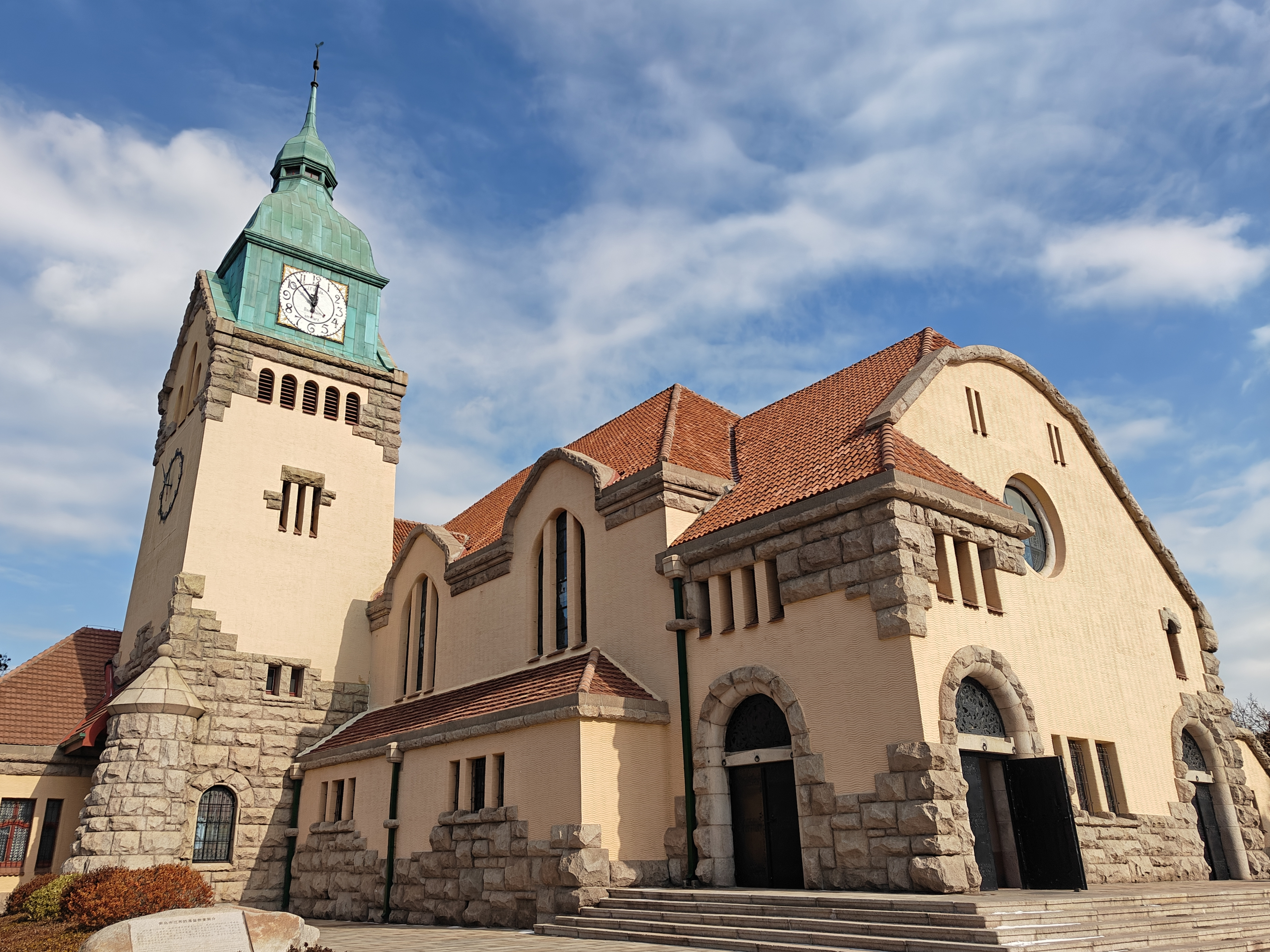
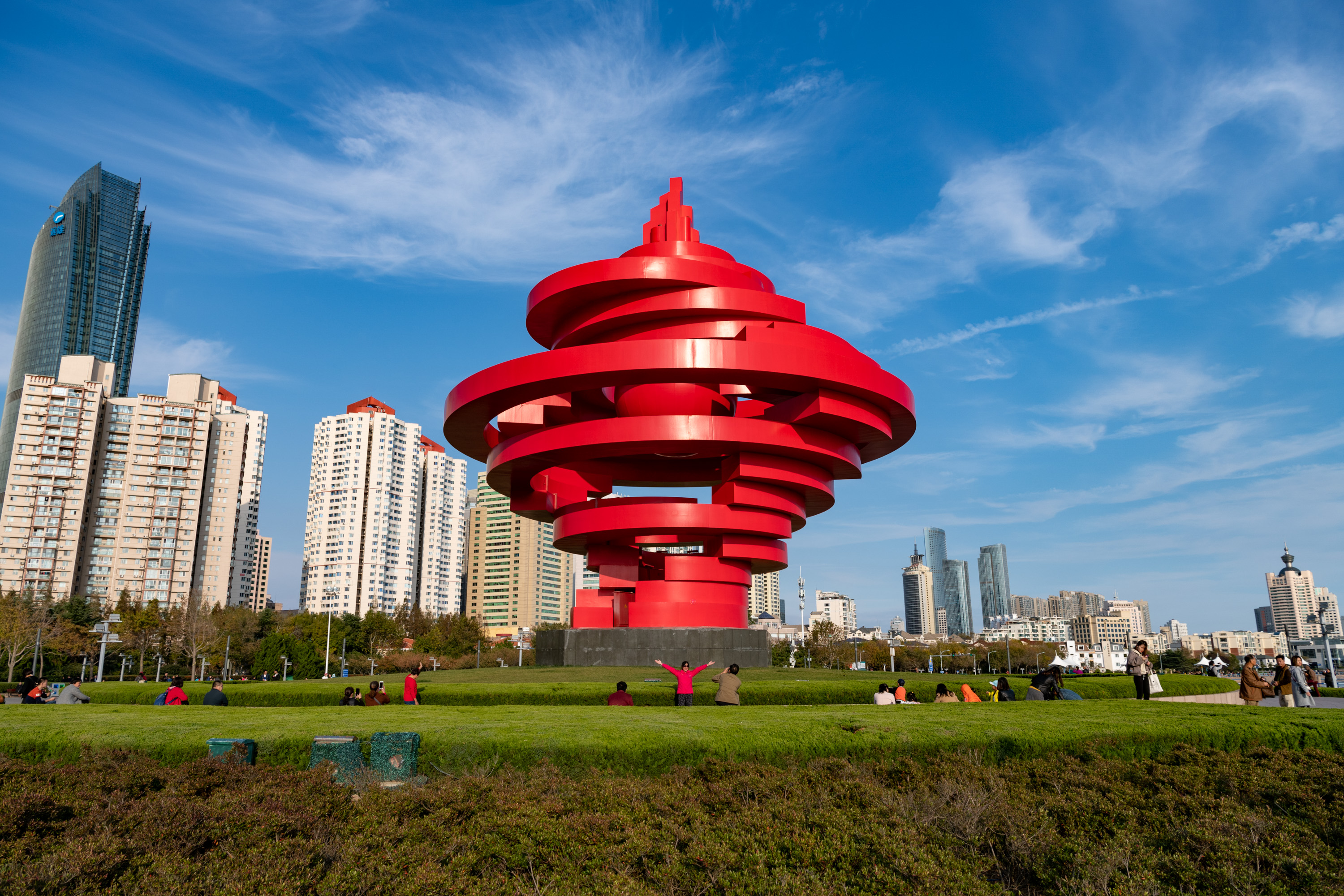
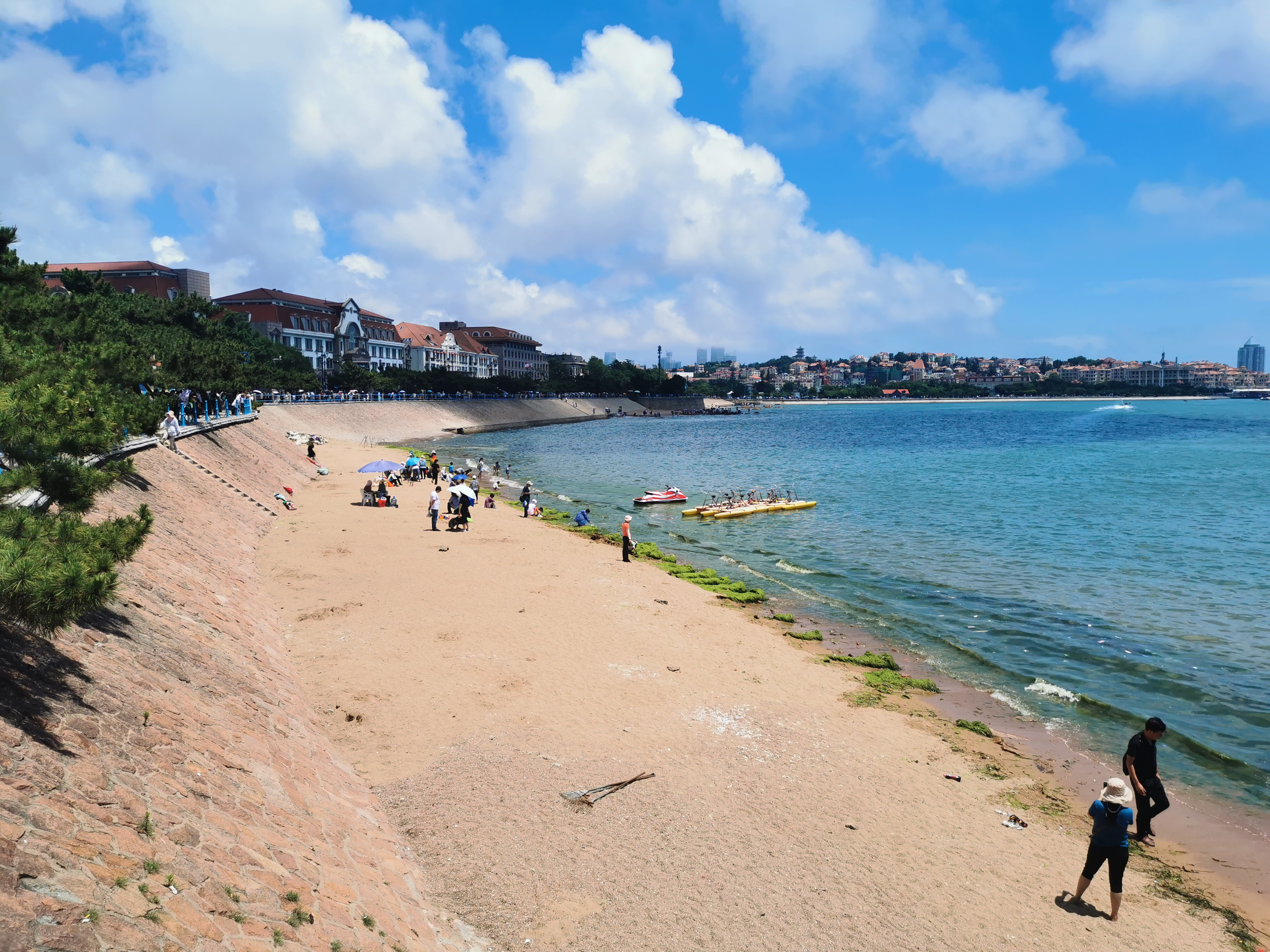
- Kiautschou Governor's Residence Aerial View Tianhou Temple Christ's Church May Fourth Square Zhanqiao Pier

- Location of Shinan within Qingdao

- Location in Shandong
- Coordinates (Qingdao City Hall): 36°3′46.72″N 120°23′4.79″E
- Country: People's Republic of China
- Province: Shandong
- Sub-provincial city: Qingdao
- Subdistricts: 11: 八大峡 Badaxia; 八大湖 Badahu; 云南路 Yunnan Rd.; 金门路 Kinmen Rd.; 中山路 Zhongshan Rd.; 珠海路 Zhuhai Rd.; 八大关 Ba Da Guan; 江苏路 Jiangsu Rd.; 湛山 Zhanshan; 香港中路 Hong Kong Middle Road

Government
  - Mayor: Hua Yusong (华玉松)

Area
  - Total: 30.01 km^{2} (11.59 sq mi)

Population (2019)
  - Total: 588,800
  - Density: 19,620/km^{2} (50,820/sq mi)
- Time zone: UTC+8 (China standard time)
- Postal code: 266071
- Area code: 0532
- Vehicle registration: 魯B
- Website: http://www.qdsn.gov.cn/

Shinan District (Chinese: 市南区; pinyin: Shìnán Qū; lit. 'South City District') is an urban district of Qingdao, Shandong. It has an area of 30.01 square kilometres (7,420 acres; 11.59 sq mi), and had approximately 588,800 inhabitants as of 2019. Shinan is located in coastal hilled terrain, and has a temperate monsoon climate. Common features include moderate temperatures, moist air, abundant rainfall, and four distinct seasons. It is notable for its early 20th-century German architecture, unusual in Chinese cities.

In the mid-19th century the European powers forcibly opened China to foreign trade. Germany acquired the Kiautschou Bay concession from China in 1898, and substantially developed a fishing village they spelled "Tsingtao" (simplified Chinese: 青岛; traditional Chinese: 青島; pinyin: Qīngdǎo). The area built by the Germans falls into the part of Qingdao known today as Shinan District.

Shinan is a center for political, business and finance activities, and is home to investment from an increasing number of Fortune 500 companies. To facilitate urban planning, it is divided into a number of areas, including a port and logistics area, tourism area, software/IT area, high-end retail area and financial area.

Shinan is home to the Qingdao International Sailing Centre, a world-class sailing marina constructed for the 2008 Summer Olympics. It hosted the Olympic and Paralympic Sailing competitions. It has also hosted a leg of the Clipper Round the World Yacht Race each year since 2005.

== History ==
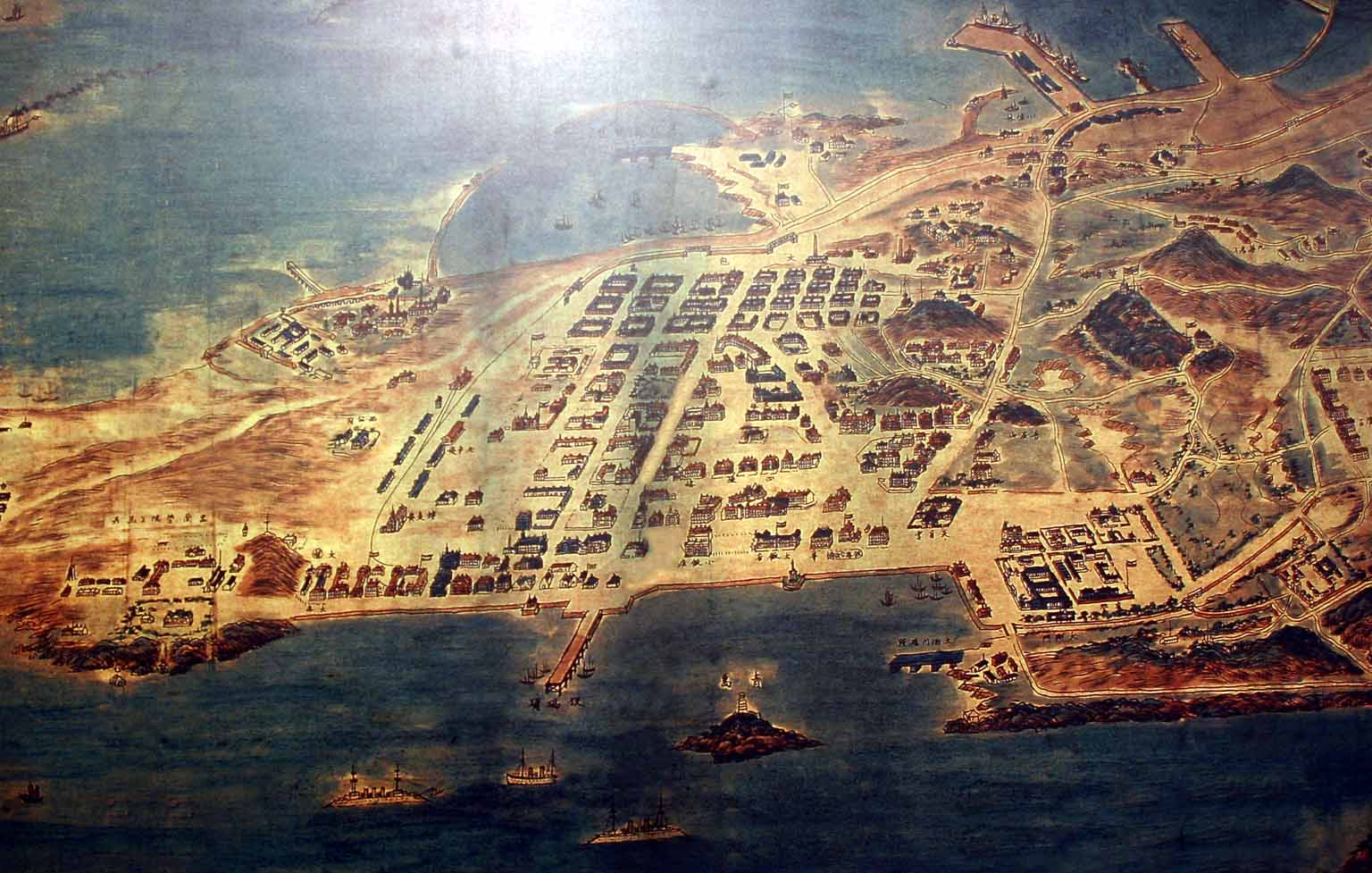
Sketch map of the area that later became Shinan District, c. 1906

After China's defeat in the First Opium War, the country was forcibly opened to foreign trade by a number of treaties collectively referred to as the Unequal Treaties. Following the Treaty of Nanjing (1842), the British established the first treaty ports. Following China's concession to the British Empire, other foreign powers including France, the United States, Portugal, Germany, Japan, and Russia won concessions as well. Foreigners, who were centered in foreign sections of the cities, enjoyed legal extraterritoriality as stipulated in the Unequal Treaties. Foreign clubs, racecourses, and churches were established in major treaty ports. Some of these port areas were directly leased by foreign powers, such as the concessions in China, effectively removing them from the control of local governments.

=== German presence in Qingdao ===
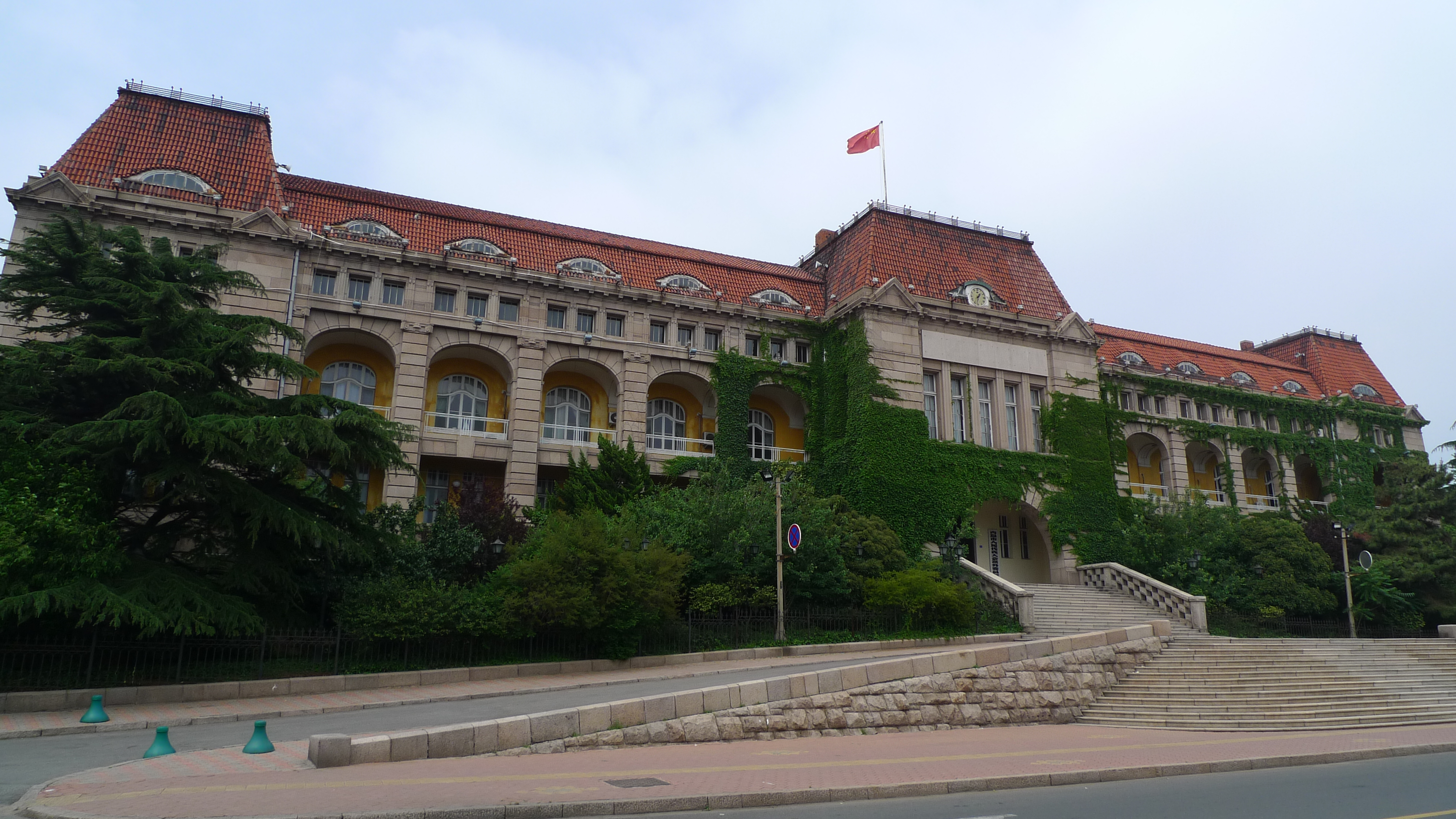
Former site of the headquarters of the German Administration

In the early 1890s, the German Empire had been considering occupying Jiaozhou Bay ("Jiaozhou" was formerly romanized as Kiaochow, Kiauchau or Kiao-Chau in English and Kiautschou in German) for building its first naval base in East Asia to expand into the interior of Shandong. In 1891 the Qing government decided to make Qingdao (commonly spelled "Tsingtao" until well into the 20th century) defensible against naval attack and began to improve the existing fortifications of the town. German naval officials observed and reported on this Chinese activity during a formal survey of Jiaozhou Bay in May 1897. In November 1897, the German Navy seized Jiaozhou Bay under the pretext of ensuring that reparations were paid for the murder of two German Catholic missionaries in the province. In the spring of 1898, the German government signed a treaty that allowed the Germans to lease an area of 540 square kilometres (130,000 acres; 210 sq mi) for 99 years, to construct a railway to Jinan, the capital of Shandong province, and to exploit coalfields along the railroad.

The Kiautschou Bay concession, as it became known, existed from 1898 to 1914. With an area of 552 square kilometres (136,000 acres; 213 sq mi), it was located in the imperial province of Shandong (alternatively romanized as Shantung or Shan-tung) on the southern coast of the Shandong Peninsula in northern China. Qingdao was its administrative center. According to Dr. Wilhelm Matzat, of the University of Bonn, "The so-called Marktstrasse (Market street) was nothing more than the old main street of the Chinese village of Tsingtao, and the buildings lining it were the former homes of fishermen and farmers. Having sold their property, they resettled their homes and fields in the villages further east." On gaining control of the area, the Germans outfitted the impoverished fishing village of Tsingtao with wide streets, solid housing areas, government buildings, electrification throughout, a sewer system and a safe drinking water supply. The buildings were built in a European style. The area had the highest density of schools and per capita student enrollment in all of China; primary, secondary and vocational schools were funded by the Imperial German treasury and Protestant and Roman Catholic missions. This area is what later became Shinan District.

During World War I the territory was conquered by a joint Anglo-Japanese task force during the 1914 Siege of Tsingtao and the victorious Allies of World War I awarded the continuation of the lease to the Empire of Japan over the objections of the Republic of China. The territory reverted to Chinese control in 1922.

=== World War II and subsequent civil war ===
The Japanese reoccupied Qingdao in January 1938 after the start of the Second Sino-Japanese War. On August 15, 1945, Japan surrendered to Allied forces, officially ending World War II, and forces of the Kuomintang entered the city in September, restoring the government of the Republic of China. During the Chinese Civil War, Qingdao served briefly as a port for the United States Navy.

On June 2, 1949, the Red Army entered Qingdao and both the city and Shandong Province have since been under Chinese government control.

=== Under Mao ===
Soon after the Chinese Communist Revolution, a combination of assertive nationalism and socialist ideology led to the eradication of the Western presence in China, including Western culture and products. "The denunciation of anything Western as 'capitalist,' 'bourgeois' and representative of the 'imperialist world' reached a peak during the ideological extremism of the Korean War (1950–1953) when the final vestiges of the Western economic and cultural presence were eradicated." This took the form of expulsion of foreigners and destruction or defacement of foreign property. An example of this in Shinan District was St. Michael's Cathedral, which was badly damaged during the Cultural Revolution which lasted from 1966 to 1971. During this time St. Michael's Cathedral was defaced by the Red Guards. The crosses topping the twin steeples were removed, with two Red Guards falling to their deaths during the removal.

=== After Mao ===
Since the 1984 inauguration of China's open-door policy to foreign trade and investment, Qingdao has developed quickly as a modern port city. In 1986, Qingdao became one of five cities specifically designated in the state plan and granted with provincial level authority over economic administration. In 1994, Qingdao was elevated to one of China's 15 sub-provincial cities.

== Geography and climate ==
It is located in coastal hilly terrain, and has a temperate monsoon climate. Common features include moderate temperatures, moist air, abundant rainfall, and four distinct seasons. In the spring, temperatures tend to rise slowly, a month later than inland. Summers are warm and rainy, winters are windy and dip below freezing. The hottest month is July, with an average temperature of 25.3 °C (77.5 °F), and the coldest month is December, with an average temperature of −1.9 °C (28.6 °F) Average rainfall is 42.46 centimetres (16.72 in) per year.

== Administrative divisions ==
The district is divided into 11 subdistricts: Xianggang Central Road Subdistrict, Badaxia Subdistrict, Yunnan Road Subdistrict, Zhongshan Road Subdistrict, Jiangsu Road Subdistrict, Badaguan Subdistrict, Zhanshan Subdistrict, Jinhu Road Subdistrict, Badahu Subdistrict, Jinmen Road Subdistrict, and Zhuhai Road Subdistrict.

== Demographics ==
Shinan has an area of 30.01 square kilometres (11.59 mi^{2}), and has a population of about 588,800 as of 2019.

== Economy ==
Shinan "is situated in Qingdao's downtown area; it is a centre for political, business and finance activities, and is home to investment from an increasing number of 'Fortune 500' companies." To facilitate urban planning, it is divided into a number of areas, including a port and logistics area, tourism area, software/IT area, high-end retail area and financial area.

=== Foreign investment ===
Shinan's foreign direct investment use reached US$188 million in 2006, a 45% increase over 2005. By the end of 2006, 2,282 foreign companies had facilities in Shinan; 55 of which had invested over US$10 million each, and over 30 being counted in the world's top 500 companies.

According to a report by global consulting firm KPMG, "Ranked according to size of investment, the top five industry sectors for foreign investment in Shinan in 2006 were real estate, professional services (accounting, legal services), logistics, wholesaling, retailing and restaurant and tourism; more than half of this amount was invested in real estate."

== Culture ==
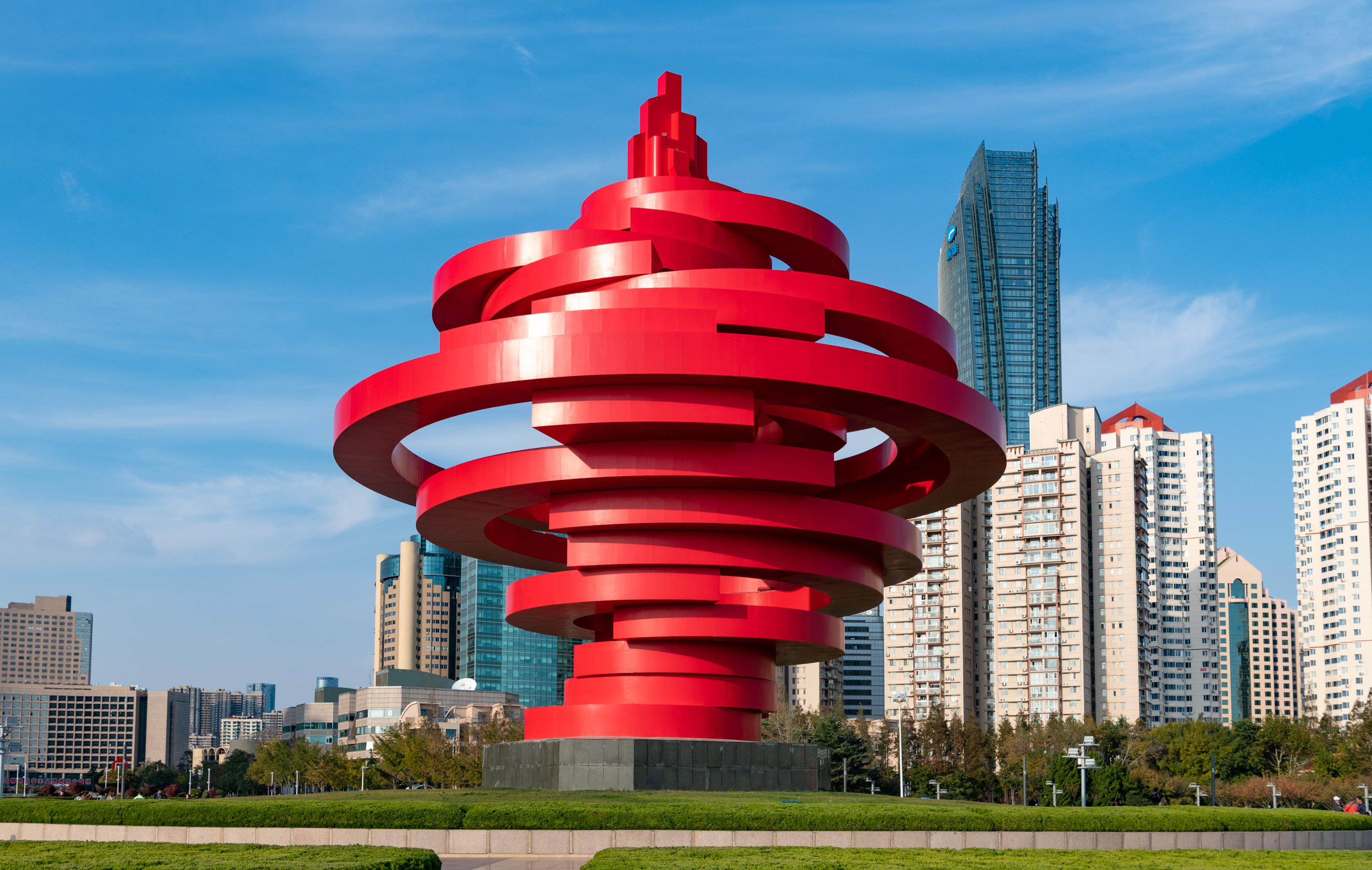
May Fourth Square

Economic reform has paved the way for rapid development of cultural undertakings in Shinan District, which strives to maintain its coastal culture in the face of major urban development by holding ocean-themed festivals such as "Marine Day" and "Sea of Love". The 2008 Olympics provided an unprecedented level of cultural exchange in the city.

Major outdoor cultural facilities in Shinan include May Fourth Square (pictured at left), Music Square, Ba Da Guan Square, Tanzan Square, Lao She parks, Huiquan Square, and Station Square.

Theaters include Red Star Cinema, Chinese Cinema, and Huiquan Theater. Conference/exhibition facilities include Qingdao People's Hall, Qingdao Stadium, and the Qingdao Municipal Conference Center.

== Tourism ==
Over three-quarters of Qingdao's tourist resorts are located in Shinan, due to its scenic coast and beaches.

=== Attractions in Shinan ===
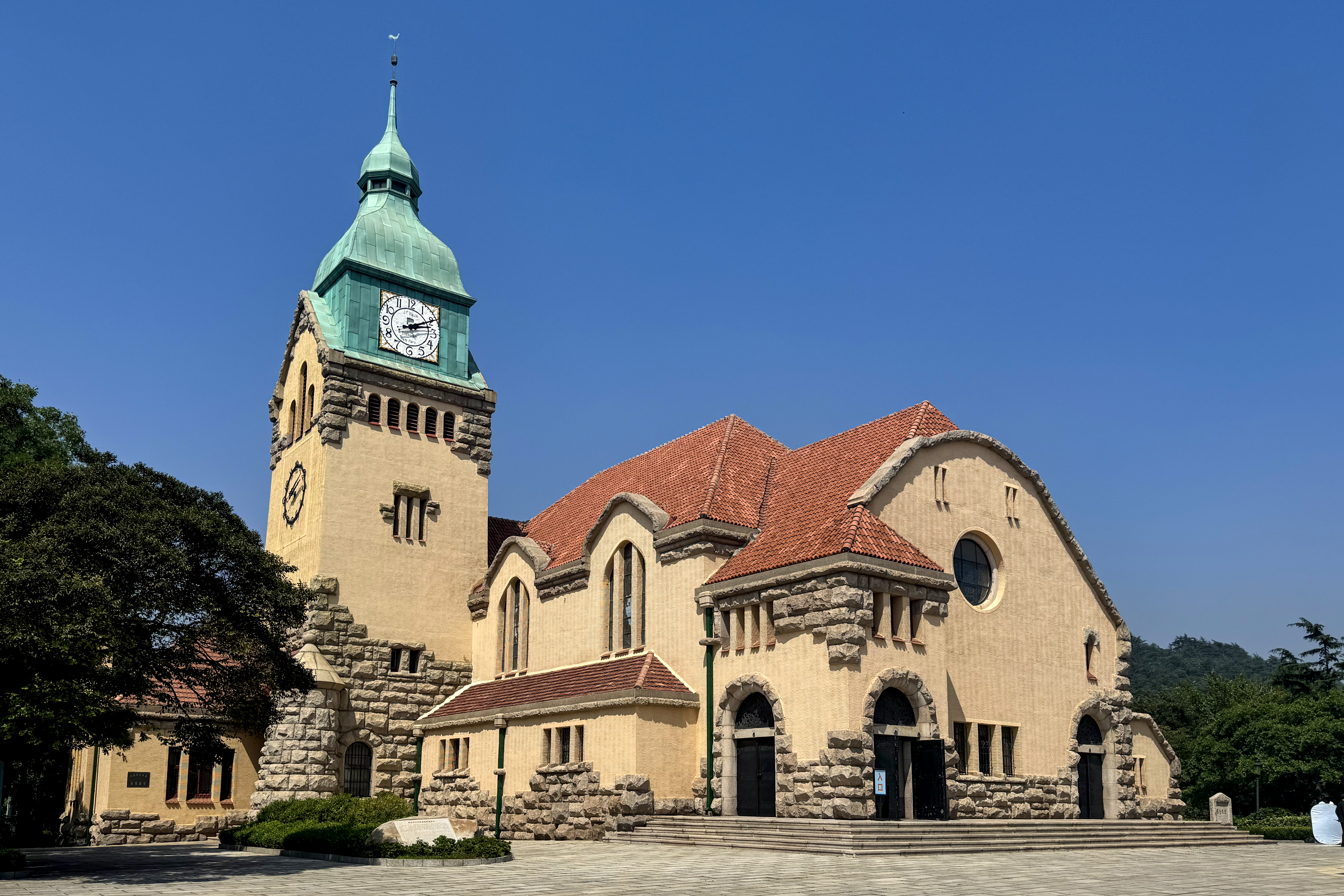
Jiangsu Road Christ Church (江苏路基督教堂)

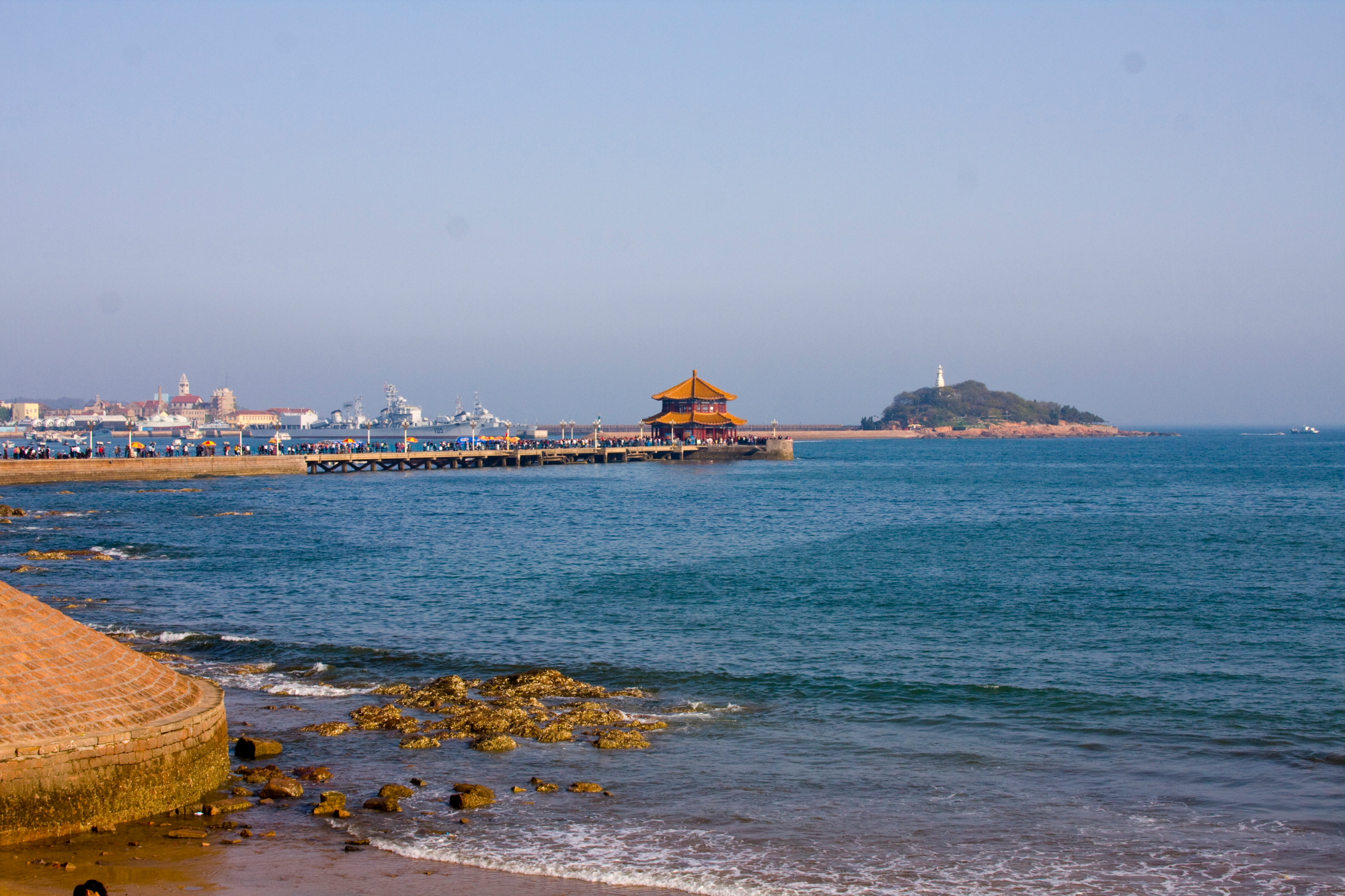
The pier on the seafront

- Zhanqiao Pier (栈桥)
- Xiao Qingdao (小青岛)
- Tianhou Temple (天后宫), Qingdao Folk Museum
- Ba Da Guan (Eight Great Passes, 八大关), an area of Shinan with surviving German architecture
- Lu Xun Park, named after Lu Xun (鲁迅), a famous modern Chinese writer and critic, who lived and taught in the 1930s
- Zhongshan Park, named after the style name 'Zhongshan' of Sun Zhongshan (孙文，字中山), a famous modern Chinese politician
- Xiao Yu Hill (Little Fish Hill, 小鱼山)
- Qingdao Botanical Garden
- The twin-spired, neo-Romanesque St. Michael's Cathedral, completed in 1934 by German missionaries
- Huashi Villa (花石楼), a stone mansion in the Ba Da Guan neighborhood built by a Russian aristocrat
- Qingdao Aquarium
- Kiautschou Governor's Hall (Gouverneurspalast; 提督府), office building of former German governors and former municipal government
- Guest House, a classic German Castle
- Signal Hill (Signalberg; 信号山)
- Guanxiang Hill (观象山)
- Tuandao Hill (团岛山)
- The Chinese Navy Museum (中国海军博物馆)
- Jiangsu Road Christ Church (江苏路基督教堂)
- Qingdao Bathing Beaches, 6 well-known beaches with complete facilities.

== Sport ==
The Qingdao International Sailing Centre (simplified Chinese: 青岛奥林匹克帆船中心; traditional Chinese: 青島奧林匹克帆船中心; pinyin: Qīngdǎo Àolínpǐkè Fānchuán Zhōngxīn) is a sailing marina located on the former site of the Beihai Shipyard on Shinan's Fushan Bay. It was constructed for the 2008 Summer Olympics. It hosted the Olympic and Paralympic Sailing competitions. Wind conditions vary greatly from very light winds to greater than 15 knots. During the Olympic competitions, fog was also an occasional factor. The sailing centre is now open to the public.

Since 2005, Shinan has hosted a leg of the Clipper Round the World Yacht Race. In May 2008, the Qingdao International Sailing Centre hosted the 2008 IFDS Qingdao International Regatta In the first quarter of 2009, the sailing centre hosted sailors from eight teams of the 2008–09 Volvo Ocean Race.

== Health, welfare, and education ==
Shinan District has 3,084 beds and 4,560 healthcare personnel in 18 hospitals and health centers as of March 2007. In 2009, the Shinan District Red Cross Society was listed as one of the top 10 county-level Red Cross organizations in the People's Republic of China.

In 2008, a training base for teacher development was founded in Shinan District, the first of its kind in the nation.
