= Xiao Yu Hill =

Park hill in Qingdao, China

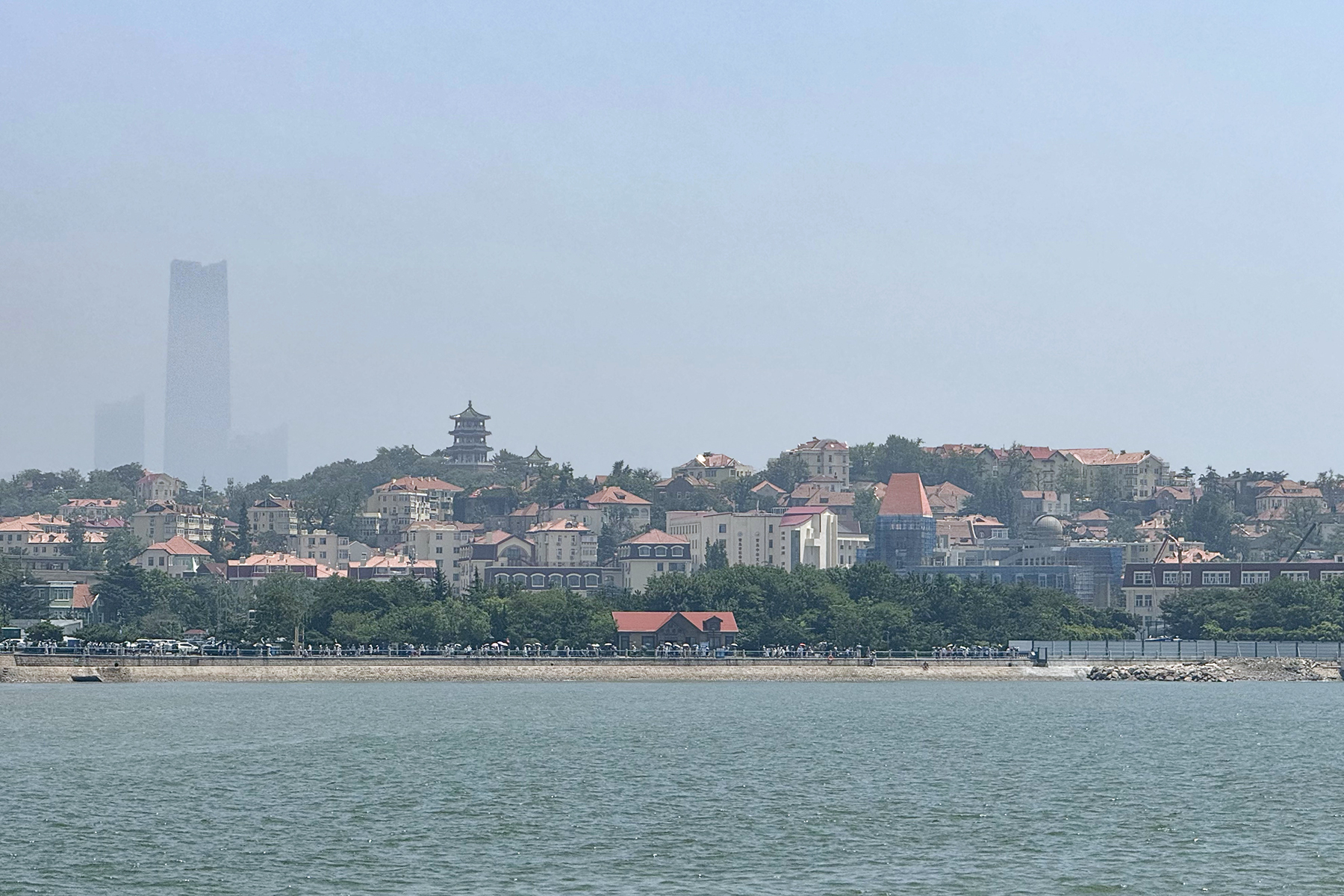
View around Xiaoyushan

Xiao Yu Hill (Chinese: 小鱼山公园, meaning "Small Fish Mountain Public Park") is located north-east of the Laiyang road, Qingdao. It is 60 meters high and covers an area of 2.5 hectares. It is the first park hill with a style of classical gardens in Qingdao. From the hill, visitors can see Zhan Qiao Pier, Xiaoqingdao Island, Lu Xun Park (Qingdao), a bathing beach, Ba Da Guan.

== History ==
The Xiao Yu Hill is a scenic spot with classicism in Qingdao, which is published to approve the first batch of state-level scenic spot by the government. In 1934, in order to promote Buddhism, the householder Wang Jinyu sponsored to build the teaching room at the top of Xiaoyu Hill. The room, named Zhanshan Building, is for Buddhists to listening to the Buddha dharma,. It covers an area of about 12 acres and has two floors, which are formed of ancient architecture. The compound roof uses black tiles. Senior teachers recall that after the construction of Zhanshan Building, every Sunday afternoon, there were many people coming to listen to the dharma. Xiaoyu Hill became a popular land. In 1959, Zhanshan Building was demolished by nearly collapsed and there is only a site.

== Modern history ==
In early 1980s, in order to develop and maintain Xiaoyu Hill, the bureau for Qingdao Environmental Health begins to construct the first classical style hill park, the Xiaoyu Hill Park. The park highlights the characteristics of the sea, the pavilion, the platform and the corridor. The bronze on the park gate is the main entrance. Green eaves tiles on the wall are also engraved with their small fish, revealing the characteristics of the "fish" mountain everywhere.

On June 8, 2012, Xiaoyu Hill was elected as a Chinese historical and cultural street.

== House of Kang Youwei ==
The house of Kang Youwei is located in Fushan Road, Qingdao. It is near by Xiaoyu Hill. In history, when Germany came to invade Qingdao, Kang Youwei visited to Qingdao and bought this house in 1923. The last emperor in Qing dynasty, Puyi, he gave Kang the name of his house "TangMing", therefore, Kang named the mansion "sky garden". Kang youwei, although he never settled in Qingdao, he would visit here and live in the house for a period until he died in 1927. The museum has the history of Kang Youwei and his famous Hundred Days' Reform. In this house, there are precious historical photos, literature Kang's famous research monographs and articles. Home rehabilitation is on display in three rooms.
