= May Fourth =

May Fourth may refer to:

- May 4
- May the Fourth, Star Wars Day
- May Fourth Movement, a Chinese anti-imperialist movement which grew out of student protests in Beijing on May 4, 1919
  - May the Fourth New Cultural Movement, a movement in China in the 1910s and 1920s that promoted a new Chinese culture
  - May Fourth Square, a public square in Qingdao, China
- Kent State shootings of May 4, 1970
