= Diederichs's stone =

Coordinates: 36°3.937′N 120°19.870′E

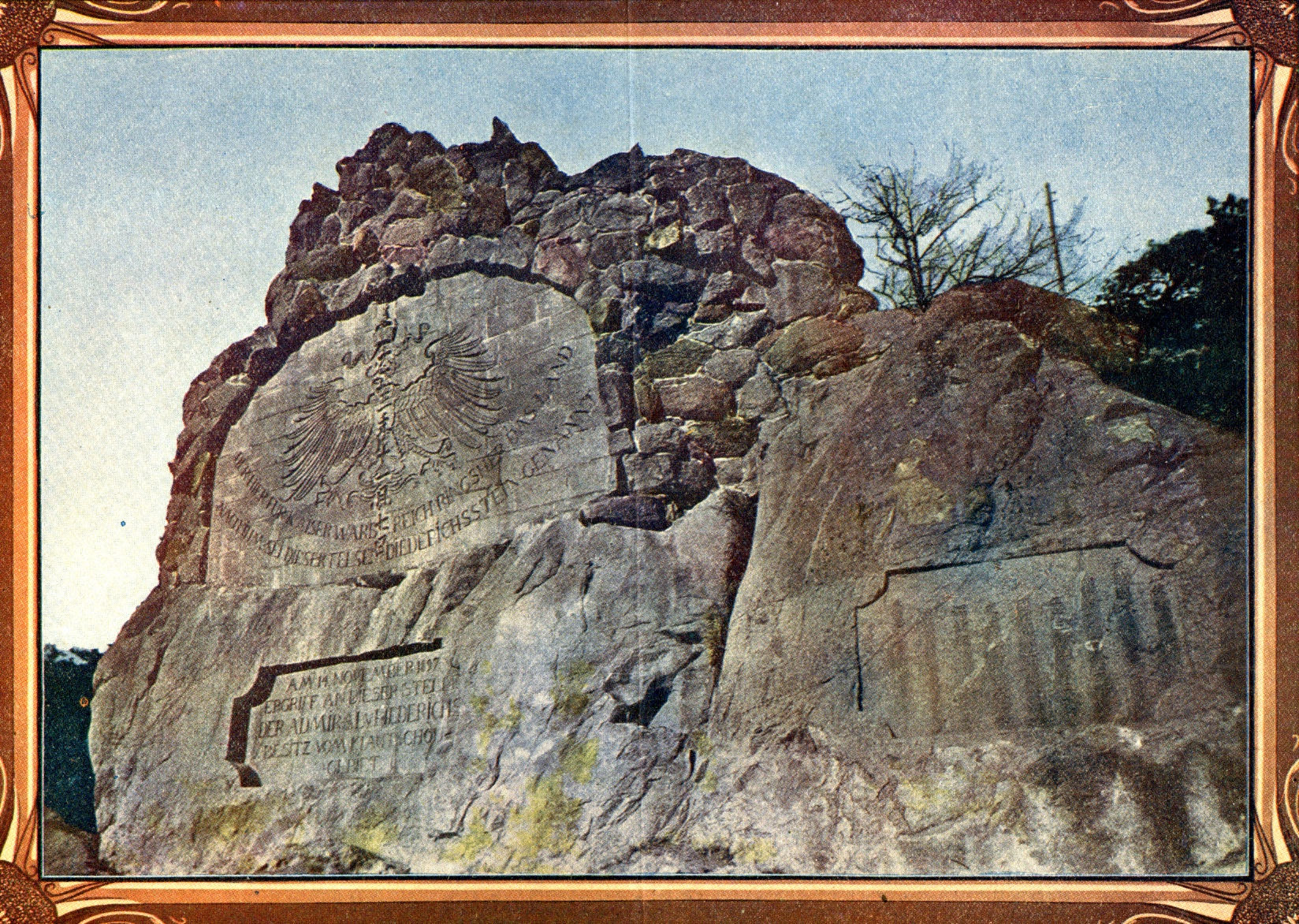
Diederichs's stone in 1918 with the Japanese inscription over the German imperial eagle

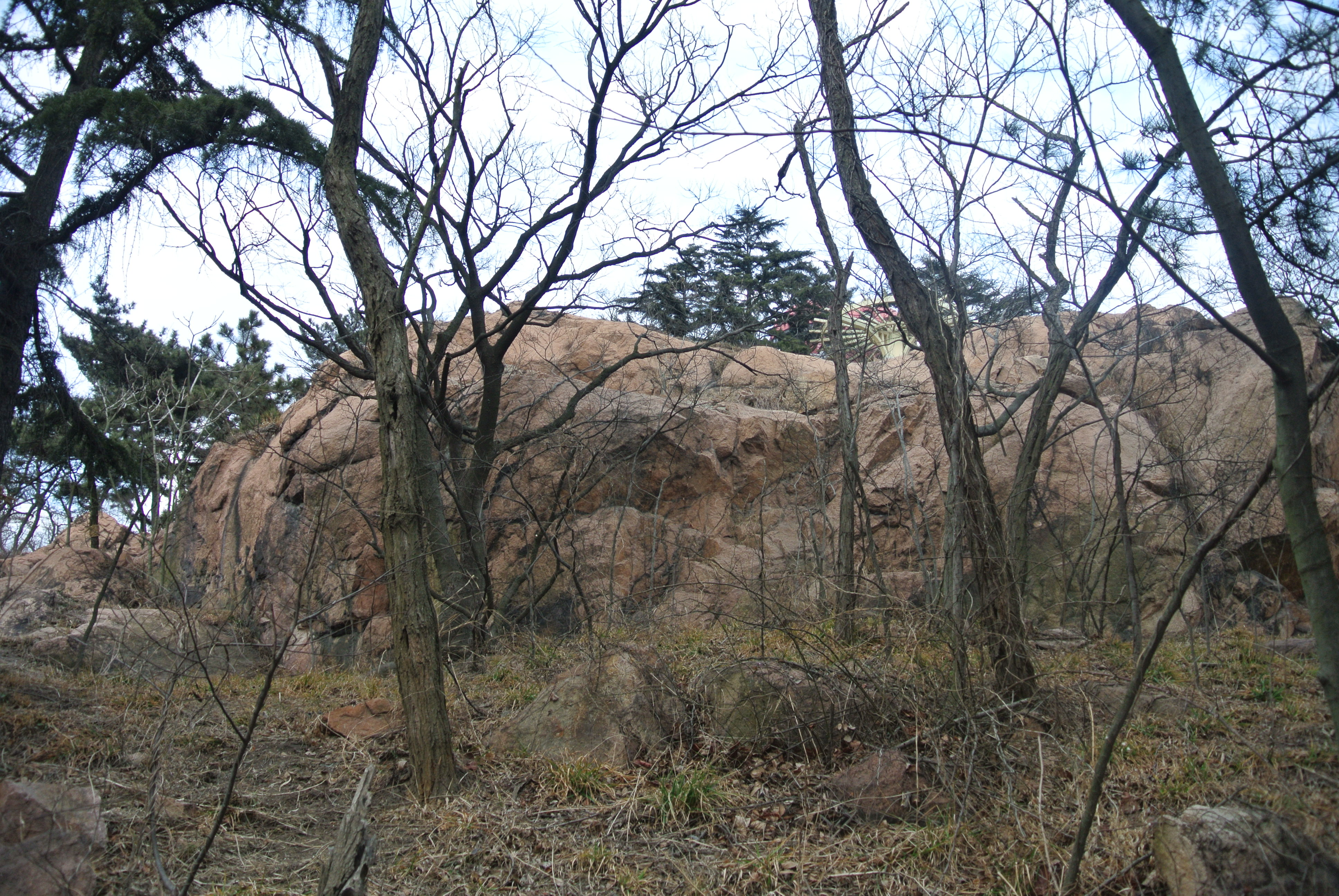
Picture of the former monument location in 2015

The Diederichs's stone (German: Diederichsstein, Chinese: 迪特里希碑; pinyin: Dítèlǐ Xībēi) was a German monument in the city of Qingdao to commemorate Admiral Otto von Diederichs and the German occupation of the Kiautschou Bay concession on 14 November 1897. The monument was dedicated on 21 November 1898 by Prince Henry of Prussia. It was located at an elevation of 98 m, about halfway up the southwestern slope of the Signal Hill, the official German name of the mountain at the time was "Diederichsberg". Its most prominent feature was a plate decorated with the imperial eagle of the German Empire and the inscription "For him who won for Kaiser and Reich the land all around, let this rock be named Diederichs's stone" ("Der hier für Kaiser warb u. [und] Reich ringsher das Land, nach ihm sei dieser Felsen Diederichsstein genannt"). Below the plate was a rock inscription that read, "In this place on 14 November 1897, Admiral v.[von] Diederichs took possession of the Kiautschou territory" ("Am 14. November 1897 ergriff an dieser Stelle der Admiral v.[von] Diederichs Besitz vom Kiautschou Gebiet"). A separate Chinese inscription was located to the right-hand side of the German text. The entire monument stood about 5 meters tall.

After Japan occupied Qingdao in November 1914, a Japanese inscription (executed using Chinese characters: 大正三年十一月七日, "7 November of the third year of the Taishō period") was placed across the imperial eagle. When Japan handed Qingdao back to China on 10 December 1922, the monument was dismantled and parts taken to a military museum in Tokyo.

== See also ==
- List of individual rocks

== Bibliography ==
- Torsten Warner: Deutsche Architektur in China. Ernst & Sohn, 1994, ISBN 3-433-02429-4.
- Hans Weicker: Kiautschou. Das deutsche Schutzgebiet in Ostasien. Federzeichnungen, Initialen und Vignetten von Marie Gey-Heinze. Alfred Schall, Berlin 1908.
- Michael Salewski: Die preußische und die Kaiserliche Marine in den ostasiatischen Gewässern: Das militärische Interesse an Ostasien.
