= Consulate General of the United States, Tsingtao =

Coordinates: 36°3′55.7″N 120°19′19.4″E

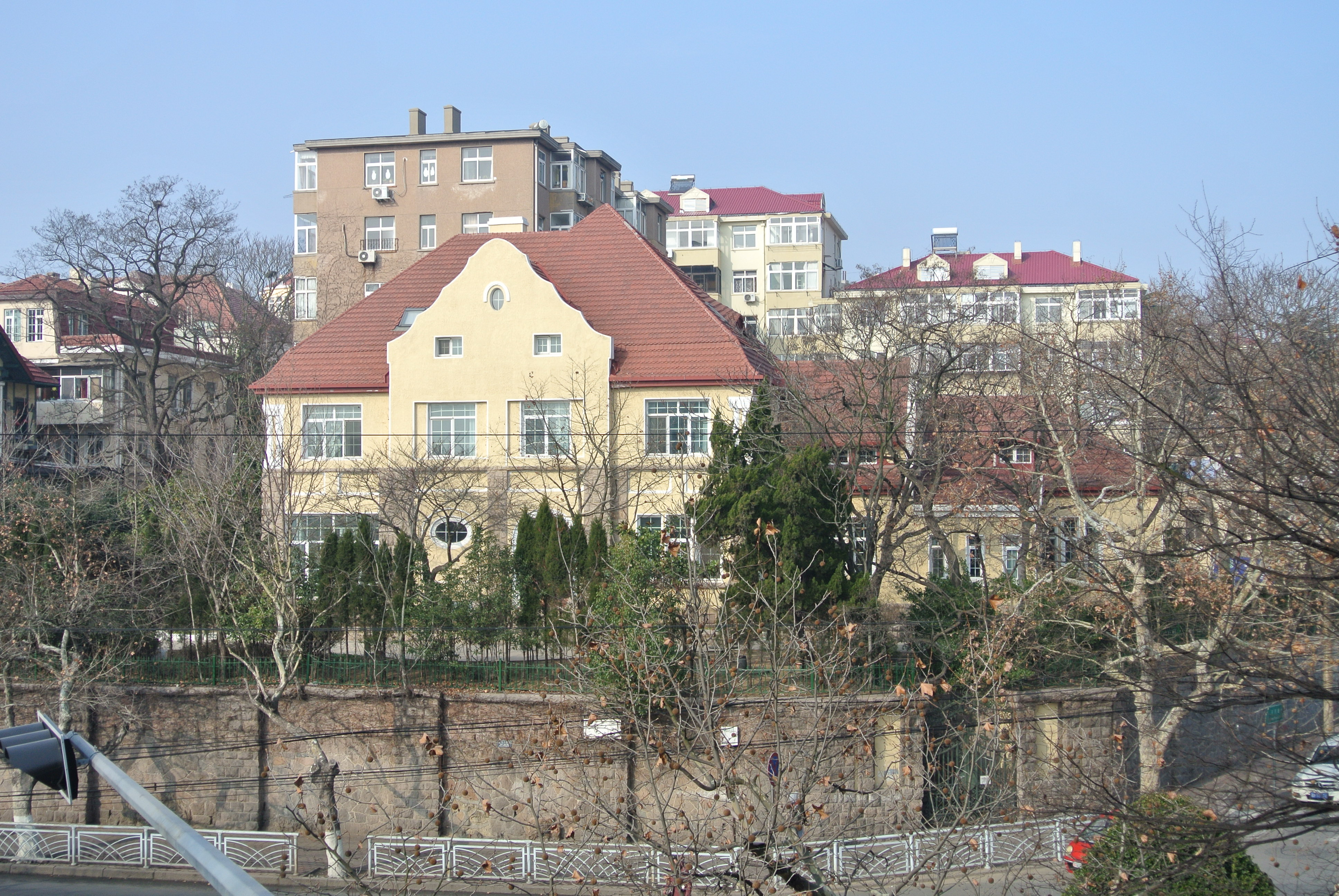
- Former U.S. Consulate building, 2016
- Location: Shinan District, Qingdao
- Address: 1 Yi Shui Road
- Opened: September 16, 1906
- Closed: October 15, 1949

The Consulate General of the United States, Tsingtao was the diplomatic representation of the United States in the Shinan District of Qingdao while the city was under control of the Republic of China (1912–1949).

== History ==
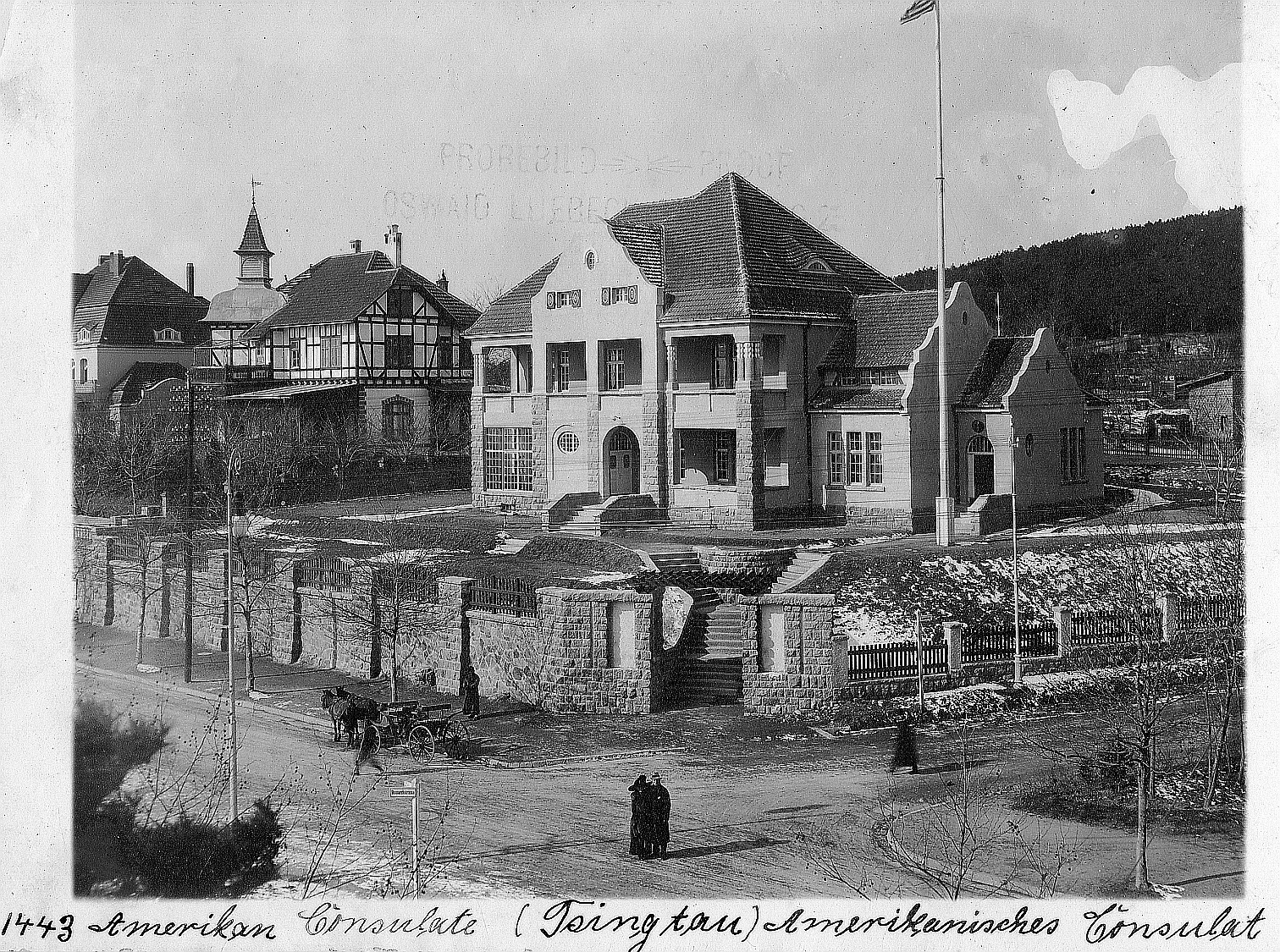
The U.S. Consulate General in Qingdao in the 1910s

The U.S. established a consulate in Qingdao on September 16, 1906. Initially, the consulate was located in the U.S. Presbyterian residence on Bismarck Street (now Jiangsu Road). In 1912, the consulate moved to the most recent location at 1 Yi Shui Road. The building, constructed between 1911 and 1912, was initially the property of the German architect Paul Friedrich Richter. In 1919, on the advice of the U.S. Consul in Jinan, Clarence E. Gauss, the Qingdao consulate merged with the Jinan Consulate, although this was soon reversed.

After the outbreak of the Pacific War in 1941, the consulate was closed by the Japanese, and the Swiss representative in Qingdao, Eger, was appointed to represent U.S. interests in Shandong. The consulate reopened on December 1, 1945, after the end of the Second Sino-Japanese War. It was upgraded to a Consulate General on September 1, 1946.

In January 1949, the consulate sold the building to Bank of China and subsequently moved to 2 Lan Shan Road, into the building formerly housing the U.S. Navy's Seventh Fleet Command. The consulate remained there until its closure. On February 24, 1949, the Qingdao Methodist Church was established at 1 Yi Shui Road. American Methodist missionaries Perry Oliver Hanson and his wife once resided there. The building was later used as a kindergarten for the People's Bank of China in the 1950s and is currently a guesthouse belonging to the Qingdao Central Branch of the People's Bank of China. After the founding of the People's Republic of China, the Consulate General was closed by the Chinese government on October 15, 1949. Consulate staff left Qingdao on January 23, 1950.

In 2000, the building was designated as one of the first Historically Significant Buildings of Qingdao. It underwent renovations in 2004 and was listed as a non-movable cultural relic of Shinan District in 2012.

== Architecture ==
Located at No.1 Yishui Road, the building covers an area of 1,108.57 square meters. It is constructed of brick and stone, has two floors above ground, one below, and includes an attic. Due to its location on a slope, the main entrance is nearly 5 meters higher than the surface of Yishui Road. The courtyard is fortified with granite retaining walls. The main front of the building exhibits a central axial symmetry layout, with a foundation of granite mushroom stones. Corners and other parts of the wall are also decorated with granite mushroom stones, while the exterior wall has a beige textured finish. The middle section protrudes outward, featuring the main entrance at the bottom. Above it, there's a triangular gable with a bull's-eye window (ox-eye window), decorative curved mountain flowers, and another entrance on the northern side. The roof is made of red tongue tiles, resembling a Mansard roof, with a folded slope near the eaves. The interior has a ceiling height of about 4 meters, featuring herringbone wooden flooring and carved wainscoting, as well as fireplaces.

The building has a clear floor plan and simple facade decorations, reflecting the trend towards pragmatism in European architectural styles of the 1910s.
