= Christ's Church, Qingdao =

- Evangelische Kirche für Tsingtau 青岛市基督教堂
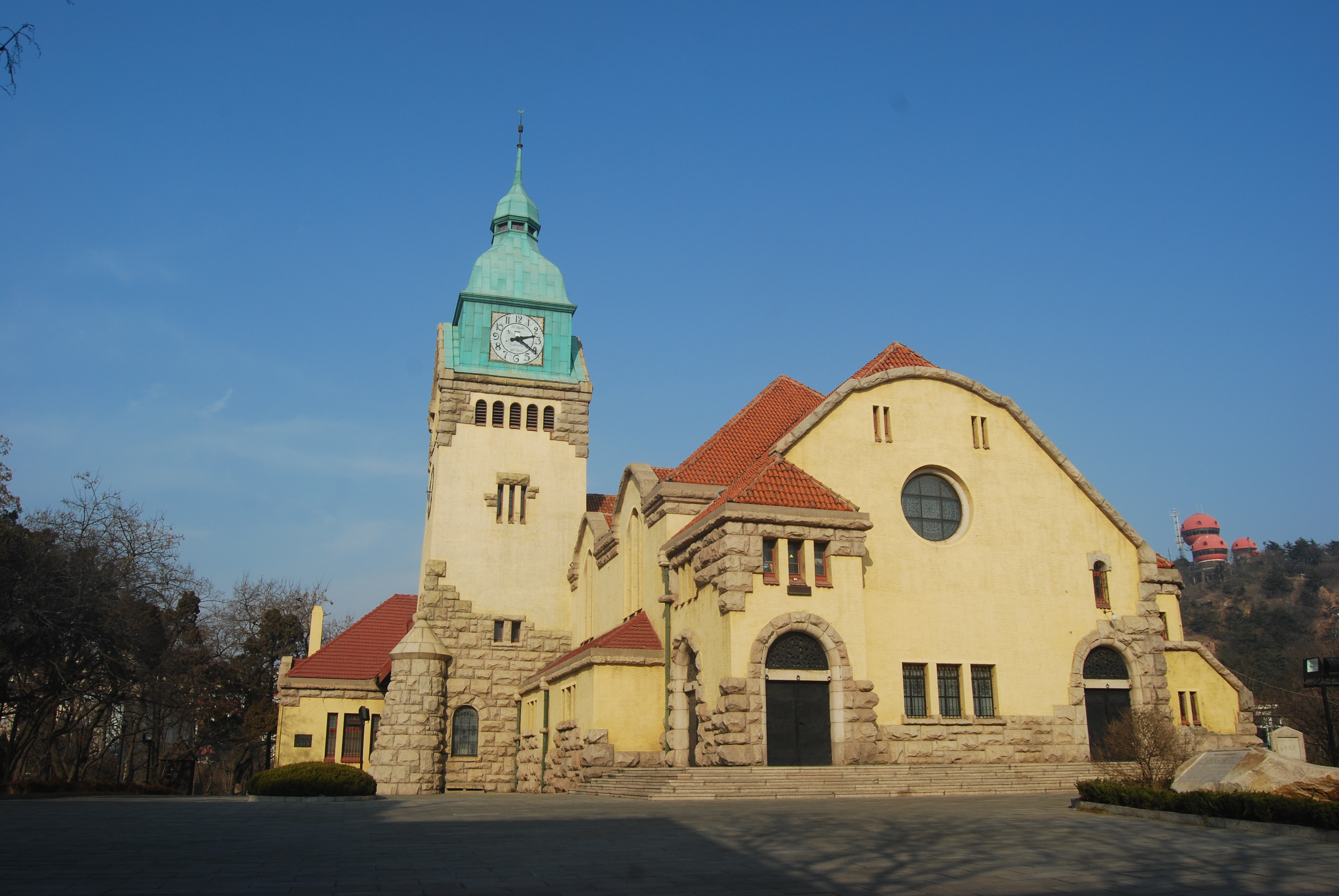
- Christ's Church, Qingdao in 2014

- Location in Shandong
- 36°03′54″N 120°19′23″E
- Location: Shinan District, Qingdao, Shandong, China
- Denomination: Protestantism

History
- Status: Church
- Founded: 1908

Architecture
- Functional status: Active
- Architect(s): Curt Rothkegel; Paul Richter; Hachmeister
- Architectural type: Church building
- Style: German architecture
- Groundbreaking: 1908
- Completed: 1910

Specifications
- Materials: Granite, bricks

Chinese name
- Simplified Chinese: 青岛市基督教堂
- Traditional Chinese: 青島市基督教堂
Transcriptions
Standard Mandarin
- Hanyu Pinyin: Qīngdǎoshì Jīdūjiàotáng

Christ's Church, Jiangsu Road
- Simplified Chinese: 江苏路基督教堂
- Traditional Chinese: 江蘇路基督教堂
Transcriptions
Standard Mandarin
- Hanyu Pinyin: Jiāngsūlù Jīdūjiàotáng

German name
- German: Evangelische Kirche für Tsingtau

Christ's Church, Qingdao (German: Evangelische Kirche für Tsingtau; Chinese: 青岛市基督教堂), locally known as Christ's Church, Jiangsu Road (江苏路基督教堂), is a Protestant church located in Shinan District, Qingdao, Shandong, China.

== History ==
In 1898, during the late Qing dynasty (1644–1911), Qingdao became a German concession. The Germans demolished the original Chinese villages and rebuilt a new European style city. The Gouvernements-Hügel (now Guanhaishan 观海山) was chosen for building a Protestant church and a Roman Catholic church. On 1 June 1907, the Protestant church solicited a competition scheme from architects in East Asia. Finally, the design scheme of German architect Curt Rothkegel was selected. However, because the bell tower's style is too modern, Paul Richter and Hachmeister read the draft and gave notes for improvement. Construction started on 19 April 1908 and was completed on 23 October 1910, under the financial support of the German Governor's Office in Qingdao. The church was officially named "Evangelische Kirche für Tsingtau" (德国礼拜堂).

In 1914, the World War I broke out. On November 7, the Imperial Japanese Army captured Qingdao. Four years later, after the end of World War I, German missionaries were repatriated, and the church was taken over by the Lutheranism in Qingdao. After the outbreak of the Pacific War in December 1941, all British and American in the north China were detained in the Weixian Internment Camp, the church was presided over by Su Baozhi (苏保志), a German priest of Qingdao Tongshan Society (青岛同善会). From 1945 to 1949, German believers and American believers gathered here in the morning and evening respectively until the withdrawal of the United States Army. On 2 June 1949, Qingdao was controlled by the People's Liberation Army.

In December 1949, the church was confiscated by Qingdao Military Control Commission. The houses was used as the Affiliated Hospital of Qingdao Medical College. The church was closed during the ten-year Cultural Revolution. After 30 years of closure, on 2 November 1980, the church was officially reopened to the public. It was declared a provincial cultural relic preservation organ by the Shandong government in 1992. In June 2006, it was listed among the sixth batch of "Major National Historical and Cultural Sites in Shandong" by the State Council of China as a part of the Qingdao German Architectural Complex.

== Architecture ==
The building area of the church is 1,297.51 square metres (13,966.3 sq ft), which can accommodate about 1,400 people.
