= Otto von Diederichs =

German admiral (1843–1918)

- Born: 7 September 1843; Minden, Province of Westphalia, German Confederation
- Died: 8 March 1918 (aged 74); Baden-Baden, Grand Duchy of Baden, German Empire
- Military career
- Allegiance: Kingdom of Prussia (1862–1871); German Empire (1871–1902)
- Branch: Prussian Navy; Imperial German Navy
- Service years: 1862–1902
- Rank: Admiral
- Commands: East Asia Squadron; SMS Sachsen; SMS Stosch
- Conflicts: Franco-Prussian War; Cretan Revolt; Spanish–American War; Boxer Rebellion

Ernst Otto von Diederichs (7 September 1843 – 8 March 1918) was a German admiral of the Prussian Navy who served both the Kingdom of Prussia and the German Empire. He was the first governor of the German Jiaozhou Bay concession in China.

== Early life ==
Diederichs was born 7 September 1843 in Minden, Westphalia, Kingdom of Prussia (now in North Rhine-Westphalia, Germany). He entered the Prussian naval officer candidate program along a circuitous route, with an incomplete secondary education, a short stint as a Prussian army cadet and service in the merchant marine.

After Naval School graduation at Kiel and Atlantic training voyages on the Prussian sail frigate SMS Niobe, he was commissioned Unterleutnant zur See [Lieutenant JG] in 1867. He served a brief tour aboard the royal yacht SMS Grille. During the Franco-Prussian War of 1870-1871 he commanded the coastal gunboat Natter. Although a French fleet maneuvered in the North Sea where Natter was deployed, "the French battle plan had little impact on Diederichs' wartime service, which proved somewhat anticlimactic". After hostilities ended, his ship was deactivated. From 1871 to 1874, he attended several terms at the postgraduate Naval War College, the German Imperial Naval Academy (Marineakademie), with intermittent training cruises in a class with four future admirals.

Based on his academic work at the academy, he was posted to the torpedo research command. After that staff position, he requested and then was assigned to sea duty as executive officer of the corvette SMS Luise for a "two-year tour on the East Asian station beginning in October 1878". With the return of the ship to Wilhelmshaven and deactivation in 1880, Diederichs's new orders assigned him as gunnery and torpedo instructor to the undergraduate Naval School and the postgraduate Naval War College, both of which were in Kiel at the time. During his tenure at those schools, he participated in maneuvers and exercises and several study trips abroad.

With the conclusion of the academic year 1890, Captain Diederichs became director of the Imperial Shipyard at Kiel. In January 1892, he was promoted to rear admiral. He traveled to the United States in May 1893 to visit several shipyards and the Naval War College at Newport, Rhode Island. In 1895, he was appointed Chief of Staff for Admiral Eduard von Knorr at the German Imperial Naval High Command. Knorr was a difficult taskmaster (even Tirpitz had run afoul of him) and after being dismissed by Knorr, Diederichs contemplated retirement.

His career was saved after Kaiser Wilhelm II recalled Rear Admiral Alfred von Tirpitz from East Asia to Berlin, an action that created a vacancy in 1897 for Diederichs to fill. He replaced Tirpitz on 1 April 1897 as commanding officer of the East Asian Cruiser Division, still without a base.

== East Asia ==
The political will to acquire a base in the Far East had existed for some time. The new Chancellor Chlodwig von Hohenlohe agreed in principle, despite reservations and a preference for "caution" and diplomatic, rather than, military solutions. Purchase or acquisition by other means, however, would fulfill that basic requirement. The Jiaozhou Bay concession was achieved.

Diederichs landed in the Bay of Kiautschou on 14 November 1897 and occupied the coastal section. He was then promoted to vice admiral. German ships now controlled Jiaozhou Bay. With the initially-tenuous hold on the bay somewhat solidified by December 1897 by the arrival of additional ships of a second cruiser division, Diederichs continually had to deal with multiple small crises involving the movements of Chinese forces with often aggressive intentions. The situation changed favorably on 26 January 1898, when the steamer Darmstadt disembarked the 1,200 Marines of 3rd Sea Battalion to garrison the East Asian station.

The convention of Peking on 6 March 1898 granted a 99-year German concession for Jiaozhou Bay. With the appointment of an imperial governor, Diederichs, now promoted to vice admiral, wrote that he "had fulfilled [his] purpose in the navy".

Following the outbreak of the Spanish–American War in February 1898, Diederichs led a fleet towards the Philippines in an attempt to seize the islands before American ships under Admiral George Dewey could arrive. Following the arrival of the American fleet, however, one of Diederichs' ships sailed into Manila Bay, where it was fired upon by the American cruiser Olympia. Dewey requested that the United States send more ships to prevent Germany from seizing the Philippines, and Diederich's fleet eventually withdrew.

On 14 April 1899, Diederichs handed command of the East Asia fleet at Qingdao to Rear Admiral Prince Heinrich of Prussia.

== Later life ==
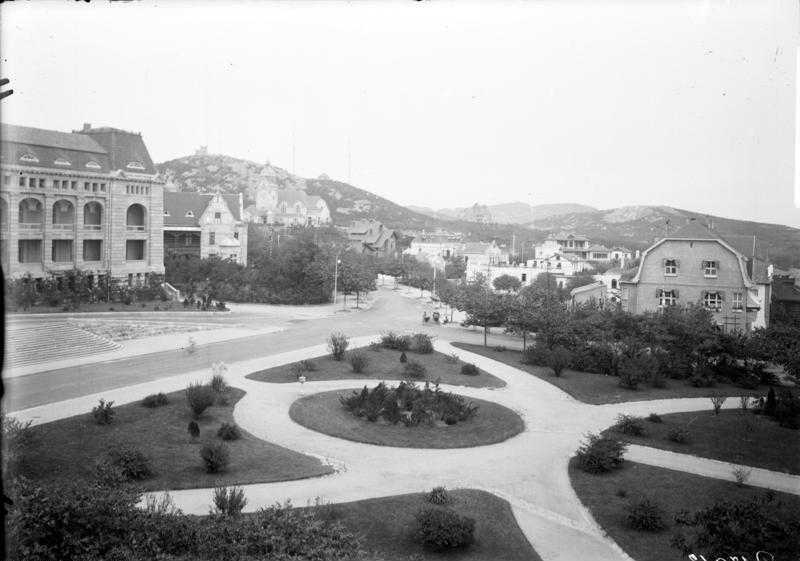
Diederichsweg [Diederichs Lane] at Tsingtao, in front of colonial government building, 1913

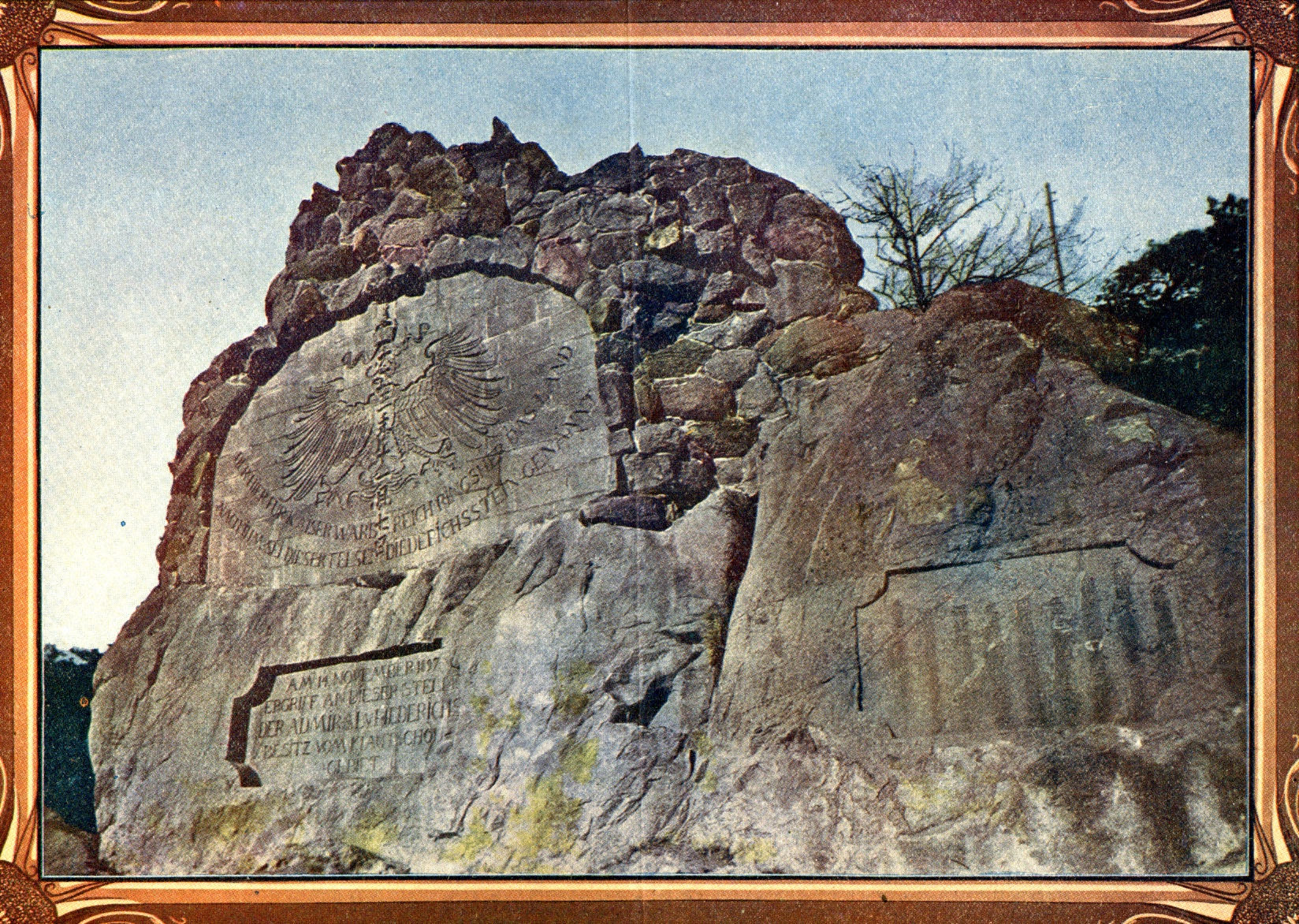
Diederichs's stone in Qingdao.

During Diederichs' two-year absence from Berlin, a major naval reorganization had taken place that propelled Alfred von Tirpitz "to the pinnacle of [German] naval authority". Into much internal strife, Diederichs stepped in as Chief of the Admiralty Staff (Admiralstab). He discovered serious organizational discords with the Tirpitz administration that he could not overcome, he did not have Wilhelm II's ear, he had few influential peers and his operational authority over ships at foreign stations was "undermined". He was again considering retirement, as he concluded that the Kaiser no longer had confidence in his leadership of the admiralty staff although he was promoted to full Admiral in January 1902.

Tirpitz did not wait but simply announced a successor to Diederichs. With limited options in the matter, he transmitted his request for retirement on 9 August 1902.

Admiral Diederichs and his wife decided to retire to Baden-Baden, where he designed a villa and had it constructed. He watched from that resort city the continuing naval arms race with Britain and the Great War. He was honored at the Kiautschou colony by having a mountain monument named after him, and a street in Tsingtao near the Gouverneurspalast, the seat of the colonial government.

He died in Baden-Baden, Germany on 8 March 1918, age 74, six months after the death of his wife, and is interred in a mausoleum at Baden-Baden's municipal cemetery.

== Sources and further reading ==
- Gottschall, Terrel D. By Order of the Kaiser. Otto von Diederichs and the Rise of the Imperial German Navy, 1865-1902. Annapolis: Naval Institute Press. 2003. ISBN 1-55750-309-5
- Ellicott, J. M. "The Cold War Between Von Diederichs And Dewey In Manila Bay." U.S. Naval Institute Proceedings. Nov1955, Vol. 81 Issue 11, p1236-1239.
- Hildebrand, Hans H.; Röhr, Albert & Steinmetz, Hans-Otto (1993). Die Deutschen Kriegsschiffe (Band 5) [The German Warships (Volume 5)] (in German). Ratingen: Mundus Verlag. ASIN B003VHSRKE.
- Schultz-Naumann, Joachim. Unter Kaisers Flagge, Deutschlands Schutzgebiete im Pazifik und in China einst und heute [Under the Kaiser's Flag, Germany's Protectorates in the Pacific and in China then and today]. Munich: Universitas Verlag. 1985. ISBN 3-8004-1094-X
- Sondhaus, Lawrence (1997). Preparing for Weltpolitik: German Sea Power Before the Tirpitz Era. Annapolis: Naval Institute Press. ISBN 978-1-55750-745-7.
