= May Fourth Square =

Public square in Qingdao, China

Coordinates: 36°3′40.37″N 120°22′48.68″E

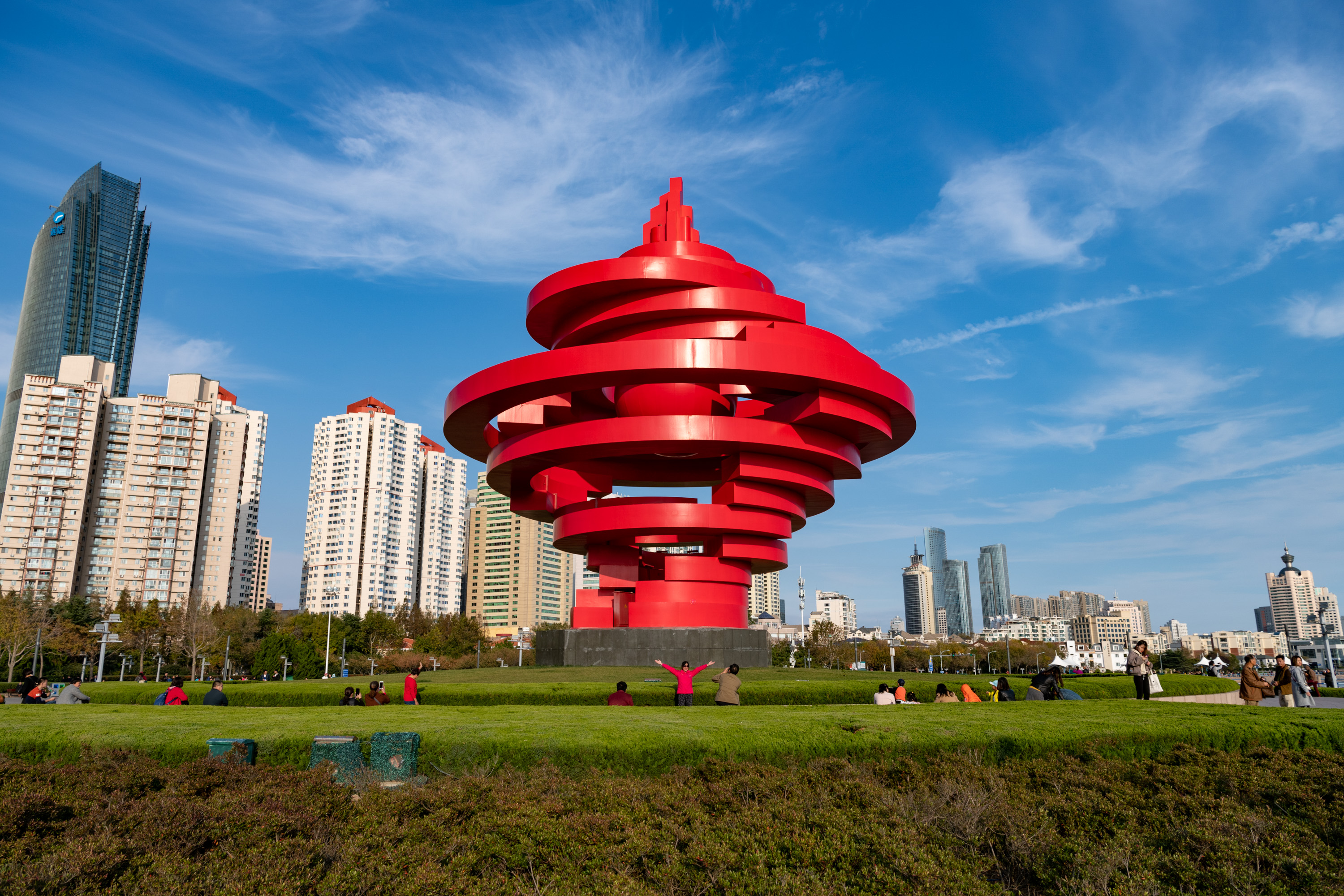
"Wind of May" sculpture on May Fourth Square.

May Fourth Square (Chinese: 五四广场; pinyin: wǔsì guǎngchǎng) is a large (10 hectares) public square in the central business district of Qingdao, Shandong Province. It is located between the new municipal government building and Fushan Bay and is composed of Shizhengting Square, the central square and the coastal park. Named after the nationwide protest May Fourth Movement that started in Qingdao, the square is best recognized by the large "Wind of May" (五月的风) sculpture near the seaside. The square is a popular tourist destination, and is bordered by the city government to the north, the sea to the south. The eastern and western sides of the square are surrounded by high-rise buildings.

The "May Wind", the iconic sculpture of May Fourth Square, is one of the landmarks of Qingdao in the new century. The color is Chinese red and the shape is a spiraling wind. Its simple lines and heavy texture show the image of "strong wind" rising from the sky, reflecting the patriotic spirit and national strength of the May Fourth Movement against imperialism and feudalism. Written by Huang Zhen, the sculpture is 30 meters high, 27 meters in diameter and weighs more than 500 tons, making it the largest "steel" urban sculpture in China.

On June 9–10, 2018, the 18th meeting of the Council of Heads of State of the Shanghai Cooperation Organization (SCO) was held in Qingdao, Shandong. The Qingdao summit was also the first summit of heads of state held after the expansion of the SCO membership. A sculpture of the SCO Qingdao Summit with the theme of "mutual trust and mutual benefit, cooperation and win-win" was unveiled in May Fourth Square.

On September 25, 2018, the light show to celebrate Mid-Autumn Festival was put on the buildings across the sea of the May Fourth Square.

== History of May Fourth Square ==
The May 4th Movement (五四运动; wǔsì yùndòng) was sparked by Article 156 of the Treaty of Versailles which transferred German concessions in Shandong including Qingdao to Japan rather than returning sovereign authority to China. Chinese outrage over this provision ignited mass student demonstrations in Beijing on May 4, 1919, which resulted in the cultural movement known today as the May Fourth Movement. The May 4th Movement influenced the Chinese delegation not to sign the Treaty of Versailles. China declared the end of its war against Germany in September 1919 and signed a separate treaty in 1921.

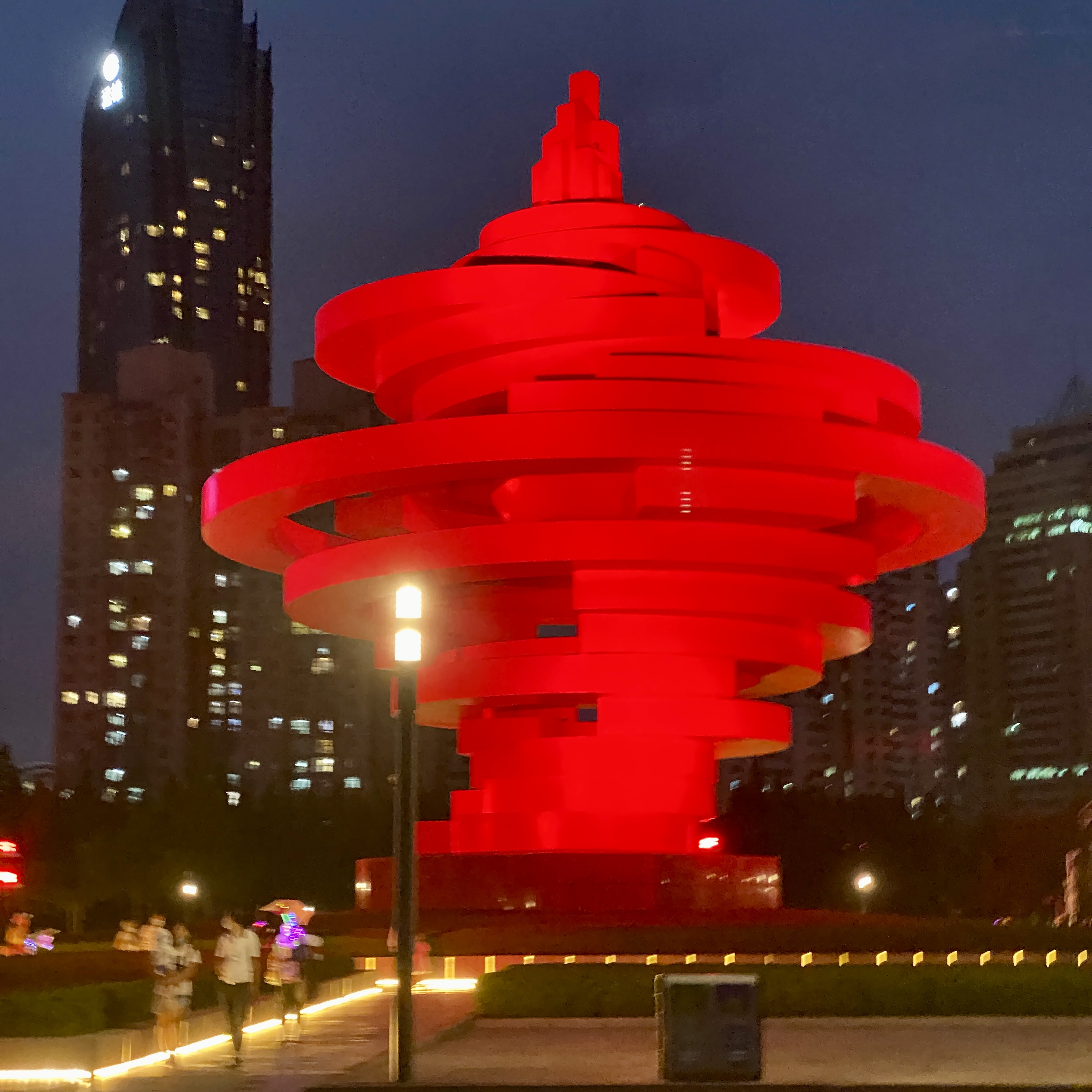
May Wind

After the completion of the May Fourth Square, it has become the main cultural landscape of the eastern new urban area. China Central Television and other units filmed special programs with May Fourth Square in the background, especially with the "May Wind" theme sculpture, to commemorate the 80th anniversary of the May Fourth Movement.

In 1919, China attended the Paris Peace Conference as a victorious country in World War I. However, at the conference, China proposed to return the Shandong Peninsula, which included Qingdao, to China (formerly colonized by Germany), but the Big Five refused and returned Qingdao to Japan. After this news reached home, patriotic youths in various cities marched to defend Chinese territorial integrity and refused to sign, known as the May Fourth Movement. It made the delegation in France give up signing the unfair treaty, but also gave birth to the new China. Therefore, in order to commemorate the patriotic movement for the country and the people, and to remind future generations of the fate of "weak nations have no diplomacy", Qingdao named it "May Fourth Square" in 1997, which is the origin of May Fourth Square.

== Layout ==
The plant layout of May Fourth Square is mainly based on the evergreen cold-season lawn, with small cypress, pine, albizia, golden privet, turtle early holly, purple leaf barberry, floribunda rose and other flowers and trees.

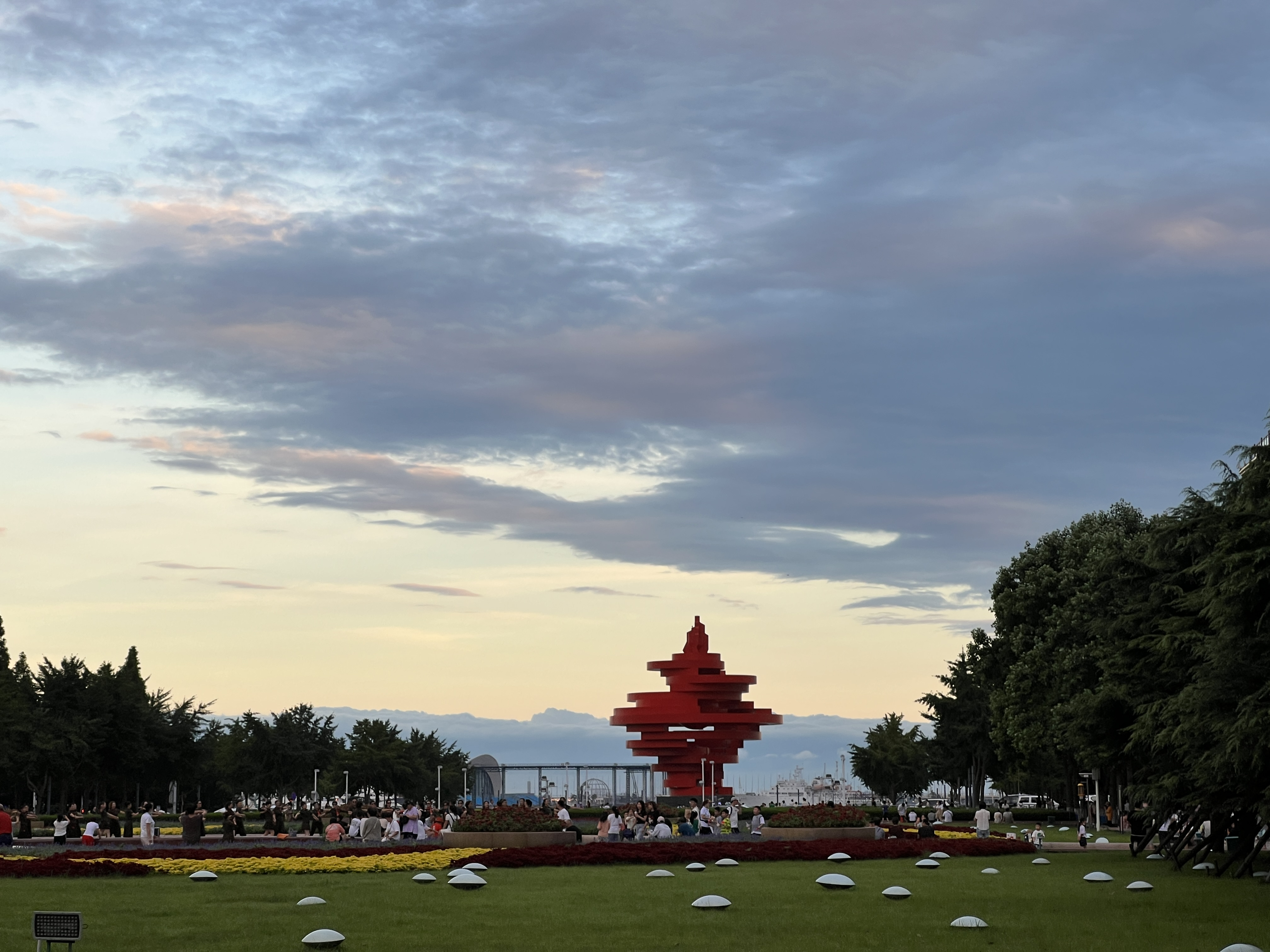
May Fourth Square

May Fourth Square is divided into north and south areas. The north area is connected to the Qingdao Municipal People's Government and is the central square. The southern district is adjacent to Fushan Bay and is the district Liangxin Beach Park. In the middle of the square there is a large green lawn with palm trees. The surrounding area of the square and the lawn are tightly paved with various patterns with Qingdao granite, and a circular fountain is located in the center.

== Transportation ==
Take the 317 road, 601 road, or take the city sightseeing line 1, city sightseeing line 3 bus, these buses can get off at the "May Fourth Square" station; in addition, you can also take the 25 road, 26 road, or take the 31 road, 104 road, these buses can also be directly to the May Fourth Square. Visitors can also choose the 110, 224, 225, or 228, 231, etc., just to the end of the city hall side gate, and then continue to walk south for 5 minutes to reach the May Fourth Square, these are also the main means of transportation.

Take subway line 2 or 3 to May Fourth Square Station, which is a two-minute walk away.

== See also ==
- Shandong Problem
