= Weak countries have no diplomacy =

Chinese phrase

- Initiator: Zhuge Liang
- Origin: Records of the Three Kingdoms - Book of Shu - Biography of Zhuge Liang

Weak countries have no diplomacy
- Simplified Chinese: 弱国无外交
- Traditional Chinese: 弱國無外交
- Literal meaning: weak nations have no diplomacy to speak of
Transcriptions
Standard Mandarin
- Hanyu Pinyin: Ruòguó wú wàijiāo

Weak countries have no diplomacy or weak nations have no diplomacy (simplified Chinese: 弱国无外交; traditional Chinese: 弱國無外交) is a phrase attributed to Lu Zhengxiang, the first Minister of Foreign Affairs of the Republic of China. The phrase is understood to mean that a country's strength impacts its ability to exert diplomatic influence.

The earliest recorded use of the phrase is attributed to Zhuge Liang, the prime minister of Shu during the Three Kingdoms period.
