= Badaguan =

Historical area in Qingdao

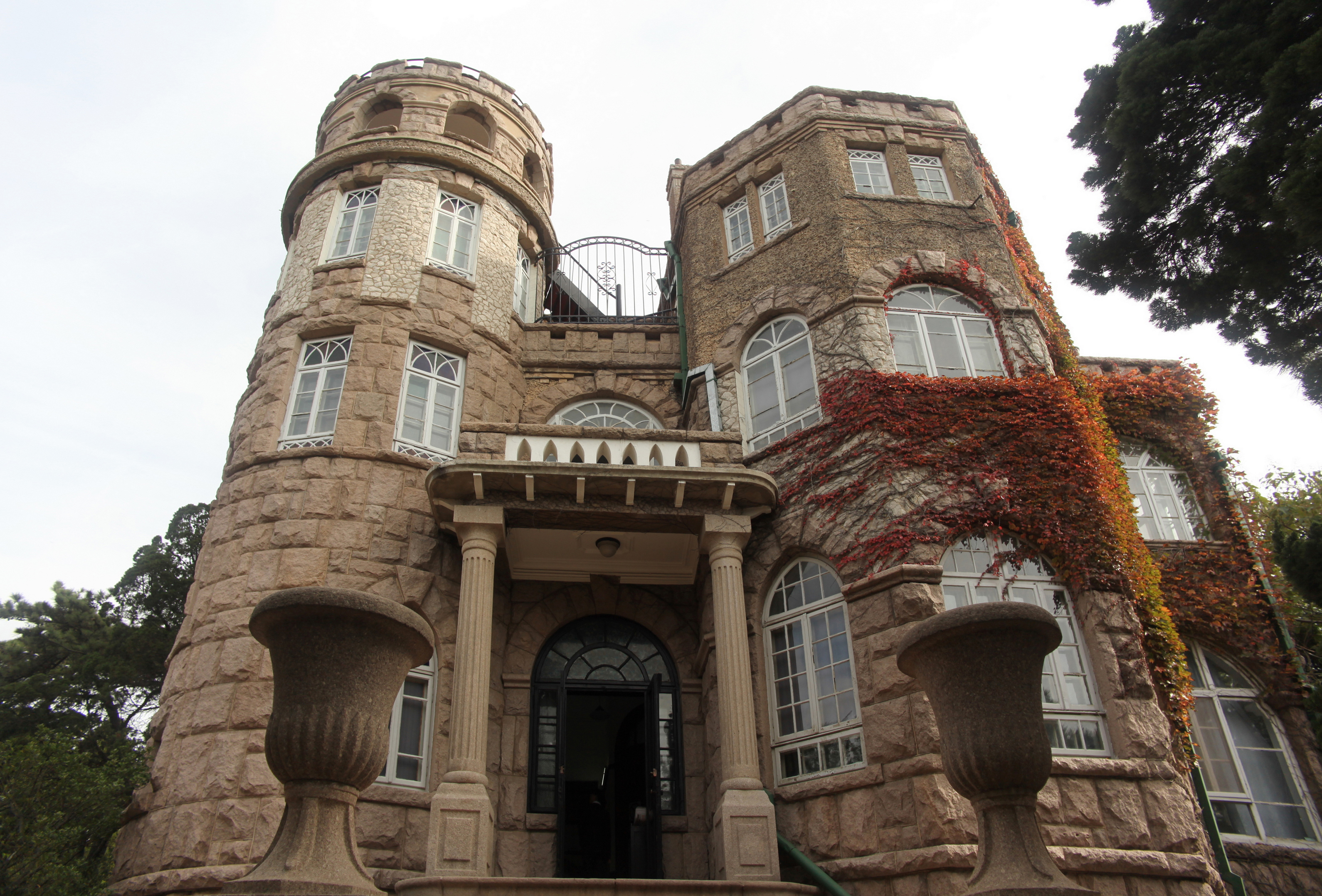
Huashi Lou

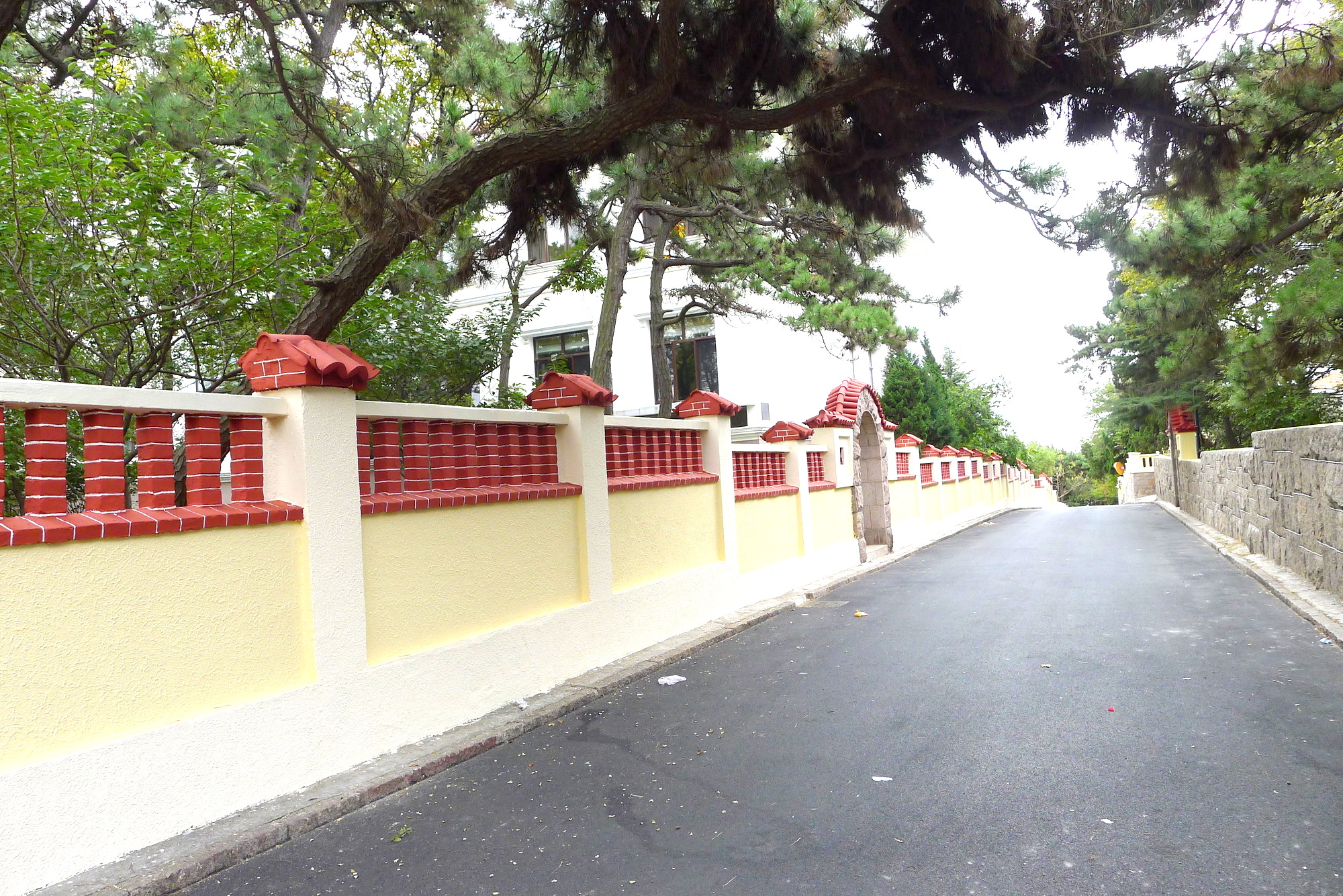
Badaguan street scene

Badaguan (Chinese: 八大关; pinyin: Bādàguān; lit. 'the eight great passes') is a historical mansion area located near the coastline in the city of Qingdao, Shandong, China.

Badaguan is made up of streets named after great military forts of the ancient times. It was originally a residential area for the Germans built when Qingdao was a German protectorate (1897–1914). Each street is lined with a single species of tree and many street names are colloquially known by the trees that line them. Along the streets are houses built in a variety of European architectural styles. Badaguan is bordered on the west by No. 1 Beach and on the east by No. 3 Beach. Badaguan is a popular destination for wedding photography. One can often see dozens of newlywed-couples being photographed along Badaguan's shoreline and greenspace.

Next to Badaguan, on the south end of No. 2 Beach, is a large rocky outcropping on which a stone Russian villa was constructed. Built in 1932, Huashi Lou (花石楼) combines Greek, Gothic, and Gothic influences throughout its five storey hulk. It is constructed from marble and stone and features a large turret and a multicolored outer face which inspired the locals' nickname for the structure, "the colorful rock building". It also contains a passageway which Chiang Kai-shek used to get from the building to the seashore.

== The streets of Badaguan ==
These streets run north-south:

- Zijingguan Road (紫荆关路)
- Ningwuguan Road (宁武关路)
- Shaoguan Road (韶关路)

These streets run east-west:

- Wushengguan Road (武胜关路)
- Jiayuguan Road (嘉峪关路)
- Hanguguan Road (函谷关路)
- Zhengyangguan Road (正阳关路)
- Linhuaiguan Road (临淮关路)
- Juyongguan Road (居庸关路)
- Shanhaiguan Road (山海关路)

== Festival on Badaguan ==
An annual festival of "Badaguan Beer Festival" is held from August 10 to 25, during which period there is such a variety of holiday events as musical instruments performance, dance performance, and beer-drinking competition.

== See also ==
- List of tourist attractions in China
