= Zhanqiao Pier =

Pier in Qingdao, China

Coordinates: 36.0600°N 120.3148°E

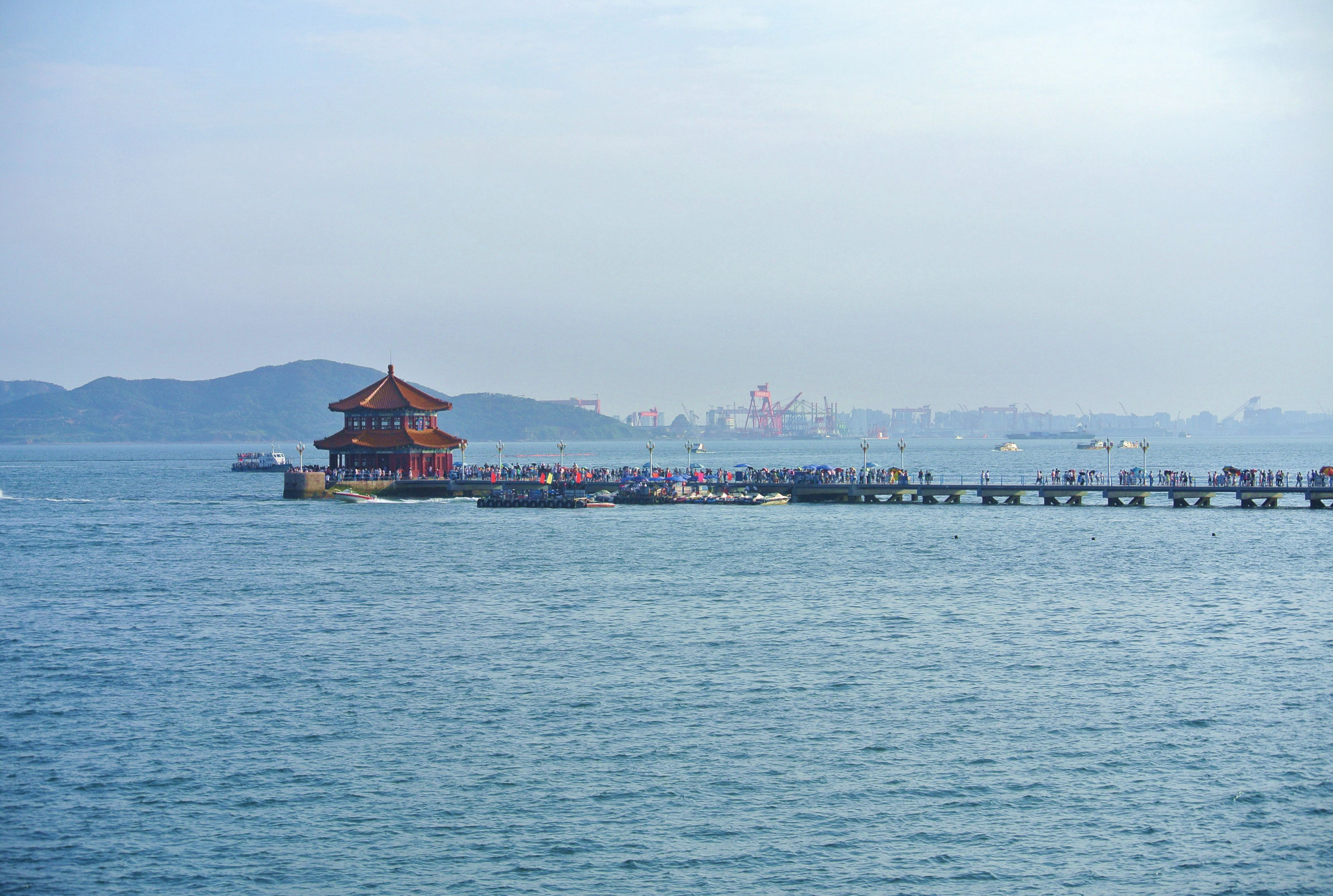
Zhanqiao Pier and Huilan Pavilion

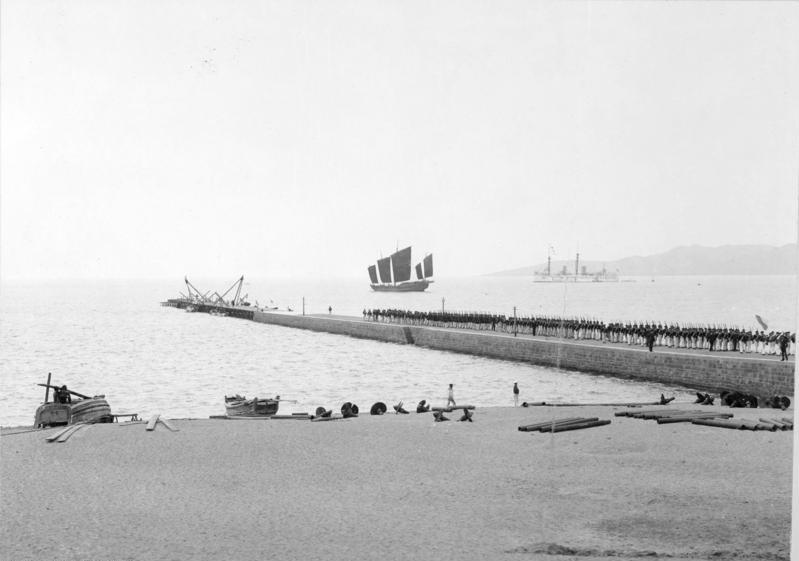
Pier with German naval personnel, apparent expansion in progress, 1898

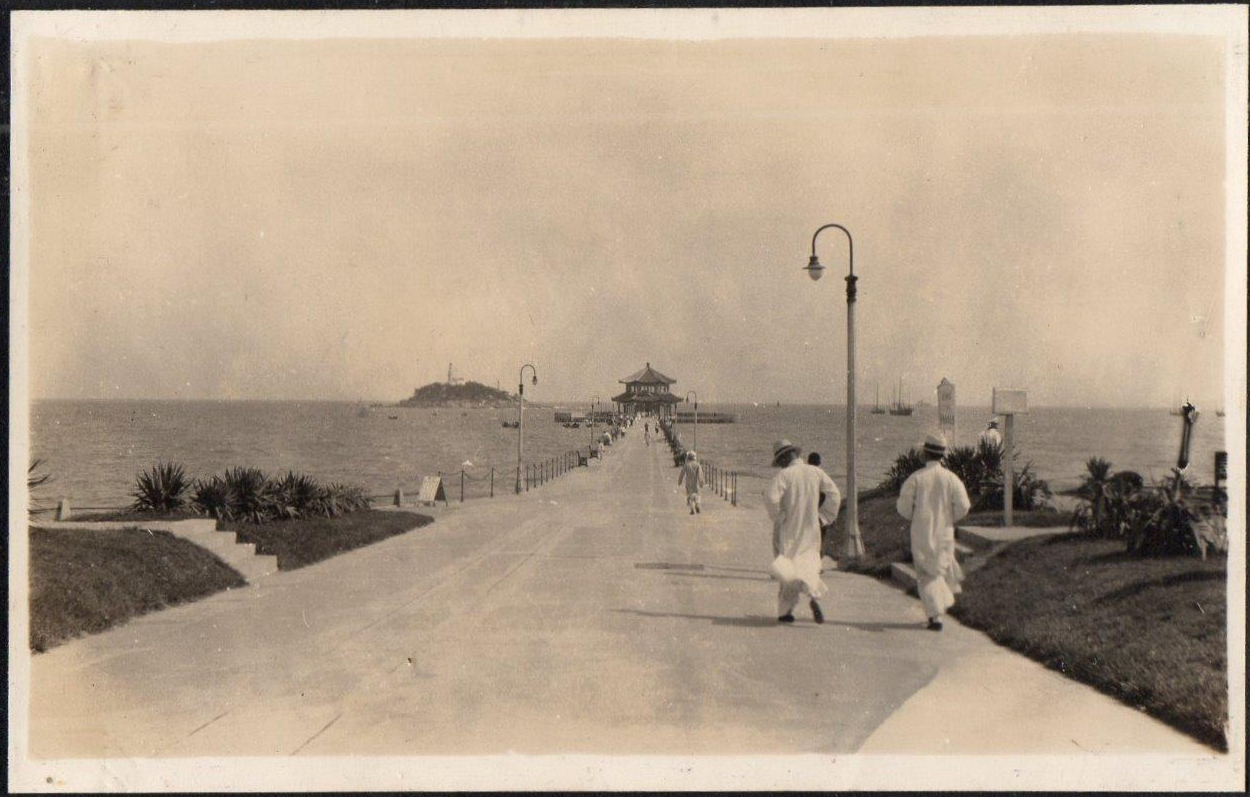
Zhanqiao pier in the 1930s

Zhanqiao (Note: simplified Chinese: 栈桥; traditional Chinese: 棧橋; pinyin: Zhànqiáo; lit. 'jetty') Pier is located at the southern shore of Qingdao, China, off Zhongshan Road. This now 440-meter-long (1,443.6 ft) pier, constructed in 1891, was Qingdao's first wharf. The octagonal Huilan pavilion (Billowing Back and Forth Tower, loosely translated) was constructed at the end of the pier in 1930, and features as the logo of Tsingtao Brewery.

Also in the vicinity of Zhanqiao Pier is the small Qingdao Island (Xiao Qingdao), the China Navy Museum, and numerous neighborhoods featuring German colonial architecture. The coastline lights up at night with spotlights on nearby buildings and several neon billboards.

== Main attractions ==
- Huilan Pavilion (回瀾閣) is located in the coastal area of the Shinan District.
- Zhongshan Road (中山路) (formerly Friedrich Straße) was built in 1897, during the German colonial period.

== See also ==
- Qingdao
- Jiaozhou Bay
