= Lu Xun Park (Qingdao) =

Park in Qingdao, China

Coordinates: 36°03′N 120°20′E

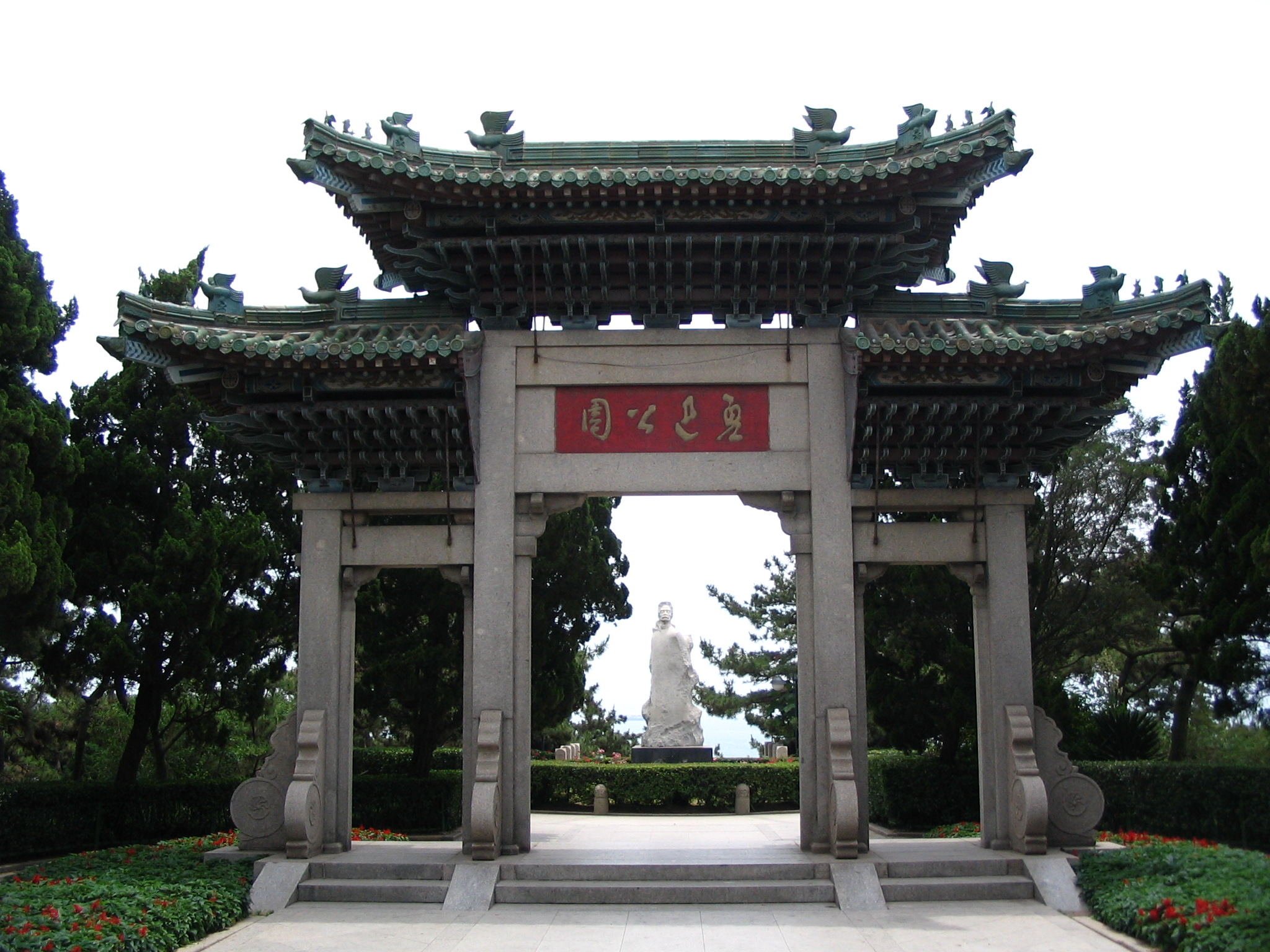
Gate and statue of Lu Xun.

Lu Xun Park (Chinese: 鲁迅公园 (青岛), Lǔxùn gōngyuán (qīngdǎo)) is a park in Qingdao, Shandong, China, dedicated to the memory of Lu Xun, a famous writer during the May Fourth Movement.

The park stretches for nearly a kilometer along the Huiquan Bay, and covers four hectares with a combination of natural setting and cultural sites. Popular places like Number One Bathing Beach, Small Qingdao Island and Little Fish Hill are in the park's neighborhood.

== History ==
The park was built in 1929. It was previously known as Ruoyu Park and Seashore Park. It got its present name in 1950 to honor Lu Xun, a leading Chinese writer. In October 1986, a three-meter high granite sculpture of Lu was installed at the park's entrance to mark the 50th anniversary of his death. In 2001, several new attractions were added, including the Monument of Lu Xun's Autobiography and the Poetry Corridor.

== Features ==
The park's main entrance is a stone archway sheathed in glazed tiles—constructed, like most of the park's other features, as a memorial. The park's name is engraved on the gateway in Lu Xun's own script. Visitors then enter an area of pine woods, rugged reefs, exquisite pavilions and sea dogs. A narrow, undulating stone path weaves through this setting.

The literary works of Lu Xun are commemorated in a 246 feet-long corridor where 45 of Lu's poems are engraved. At the center of the corridor is a copper embossed relief portrait of the writer.

The park also features Underwater World, with the Qingdao Aquarium, Qingdao Specimen Hall, South Pole Hall, Freshwater Fish Hall and Endangered Species Hall.

The park opens from 7:30 A.M. to 6:30 P.M. Admission is free.
