= Xiao Qingdao =

Island in Qingdao, China

Coordinates: 36°03′10″N 120°19′07″E

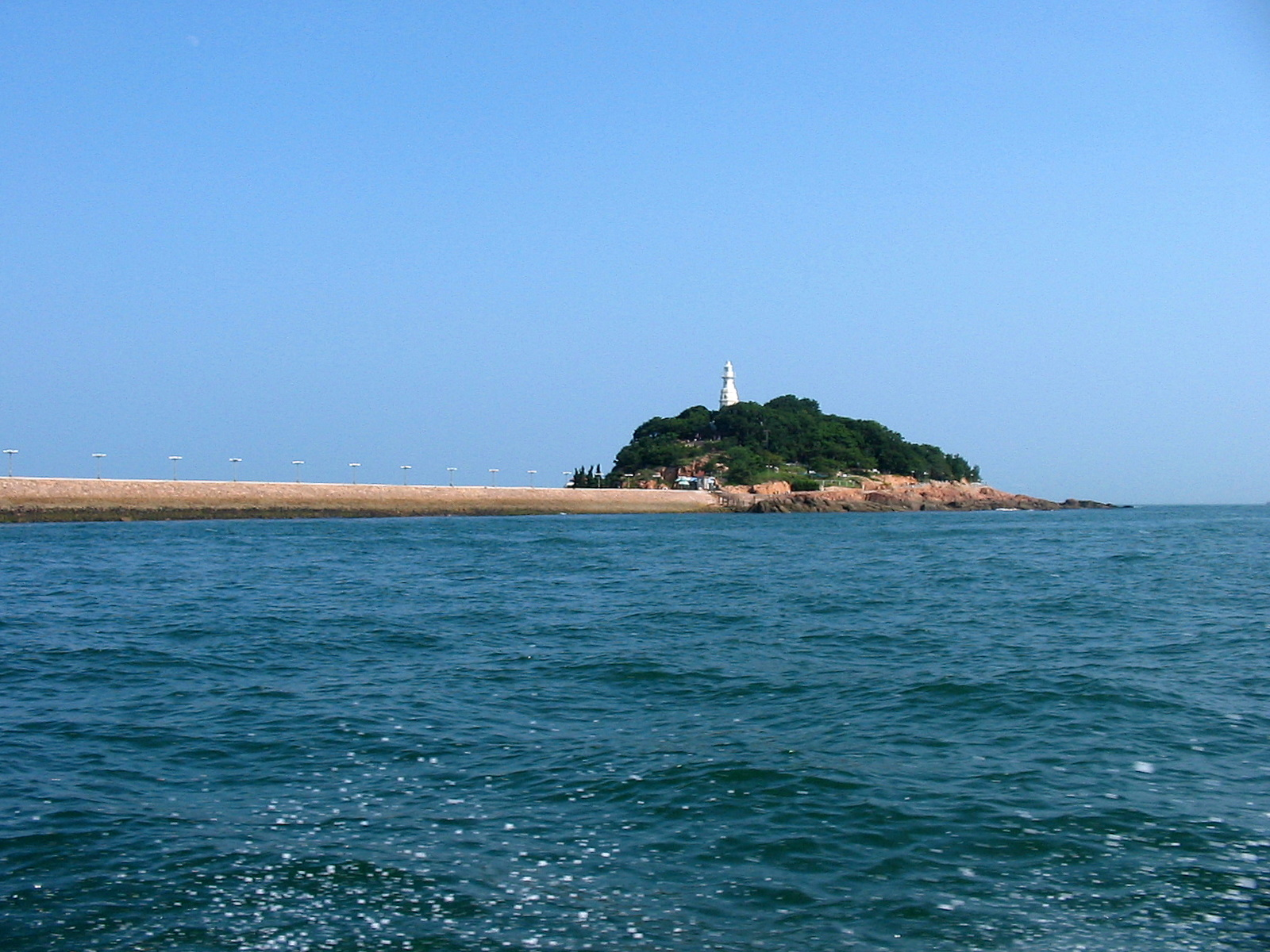
Xiao Qingdao from the sea

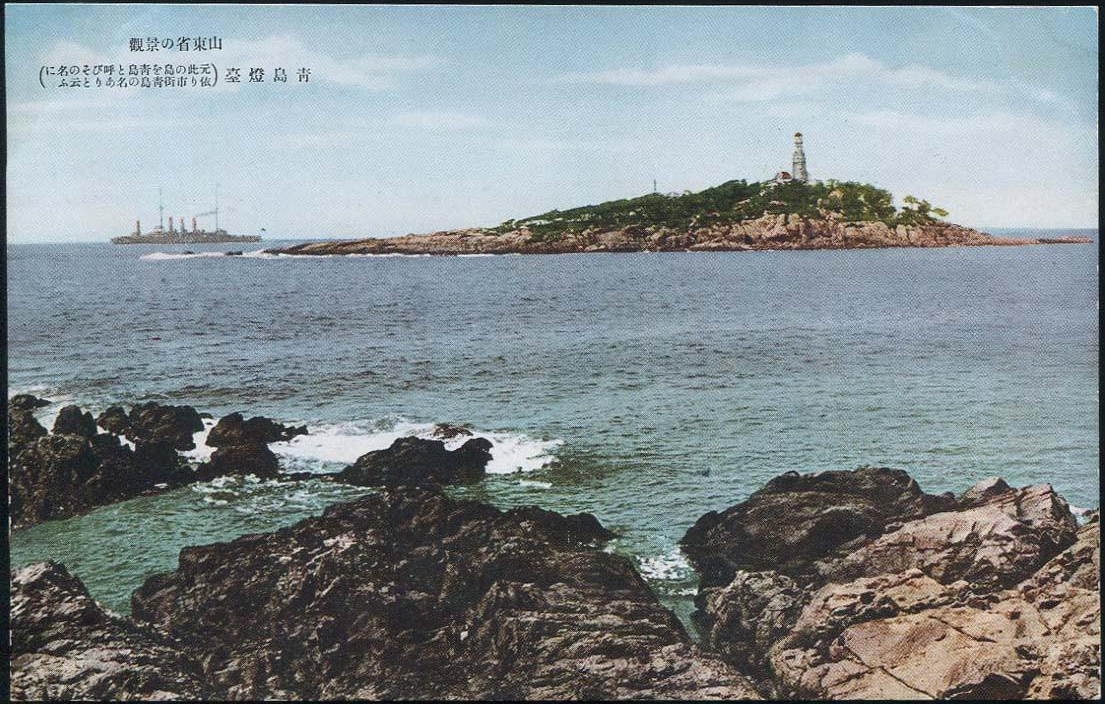
Xiao Qingdao in the 1930s

Xiao Qingdao (Chinese: 小青岛; lit. 'little Qingdao'; other name: Qin Dao) is an island in Qingdao, Shandong, China. It is located in the southeast of Zhan Qiao pier.

Xiao Qingdao was a restricted military area until 1897. During the German occupation in the 1900s, they named "Qingdao" for their leased territory. Germans named the islet "Arcona Island" (German: Arcona Insel) after the cruiser Arcona, whose name itself derived from Cape Arkona on Rügen. However, hand-drawn Chinese maps of Qingdao from the 1900s continued to label the islet as “Qingdao.” In 1904, the harbor department of the Governor’s Office constructed on it a 12.5-meter-tall, white-marble, octagonal pyramidal lighthouse, which is today’s Xiaoqingdao Lighthouse. After 1914, the Japanese attacked Jiaozhou Bay and occupied it, and afterwards they renamed Xiao Qingdao to "Kato Island" (加藤島), named after IJN admiral Katō Sadakichi.

Local people named this island "Xiao Qingdao" because it is a small island. "Xiao" means small in Chinese. The area of Xiao Qingdao is 0.024 square kilometers and 17 meters above sea level. Also they called it "Qin Dao" because the shape of the island looks like an ancient musical instrument.
