= Xinhao Hill =

Signal Hill
- Xinhao Qiū
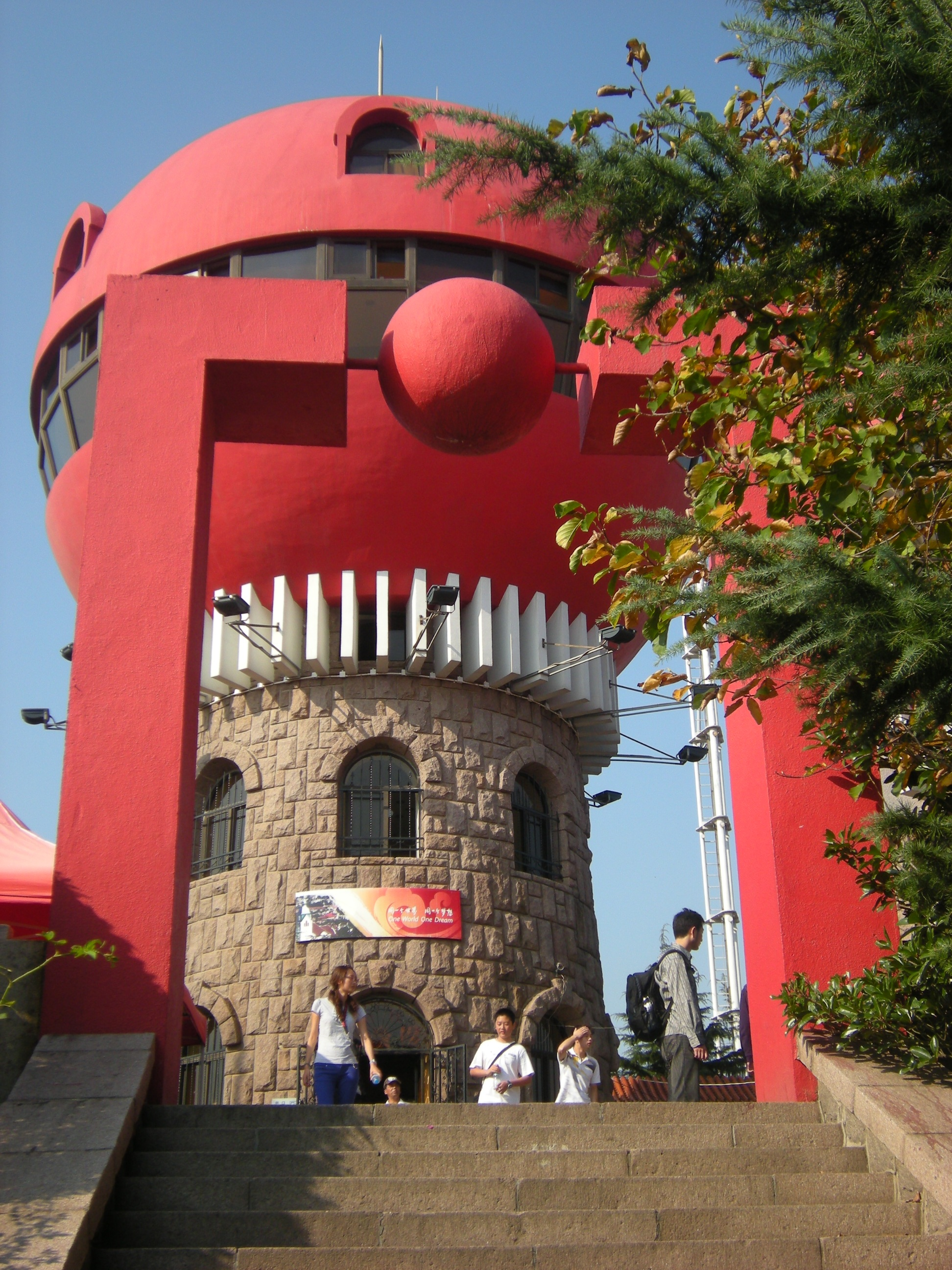

General information
- Location: Qingdao, China, 18 Lonshan Rd, Qingdao, China
- Coordinates: 36.0661°N 120.3267°E
- Elevation: 68 m (223 ft)

Height
- Height: 26 m (85 ft)

The Xinhao or Signal Hill (German: Signalberg, früher bekannt als Diederichsberg; Chinese: 信号山), located to the south of Guanxiang Hill and to the southwest of Qingdao Hill, is a landmark of Qingdao, China, well known for its three torch-like towers. It is one of the best locations to get a good view of both the sea and downtown area.
