= Second Qingdao Jiaozhou Bay Tunnel =

Under construction tunnel in Qingdao, China

Overview
- Location: Jiaozhou Bay, Qingdao, Shandong Province, China
- Status: Under construction
- Start: Huangdao District, Qingdao
- End: Shibei District, Qingdao

Operation
- Work began: 29 October 2020

Technical
- Length: 17.48 km (10.86 mi)
- No. of lanes: 6
- Operating speed: 80 km/h (50 mph)
- Min elevation: −115 m (−377 ft)
- Tunnel clearance: 4.5 m (15 ft)

The Second Qingdao Jiaozhou Bay Tunnel is an under construction under-sea road tunnel located in Qingdao, Shandong, China. Once completed and scheduled to commence operation in December 2027, five new world records for under-sea road tunnel will be set:

- The world's largest cross section underwater highway tunnel.
- The largest volume of earth and rock excavation in the history of undersea tunnel construction.
- The world's first ultra-large-diameter shield tunnel connected to a large-section drill-and-blast tunnel connection.
- The world's highest water pressure ultra-large diameter shield tunnel.
- The world's longest underwater road tunnel.

It crosses underneath Jiaozhou Bay, connecting Huaihe East Road in the north to Beihai Bohe Elevated Road in the south and the journey from old Huangdao to areas like old Sifang and Huanle Binhai City will be significantly reduced from several hours to less than 25 minutes with a design speed of 80 km/h (50 mph).

The total length of the tunnel road is about 17.48 km (10.86 mi), with a total investment of 17.328 billion RMB and a design service life up to 100 years of operation. The main tunnel section is about 14.37 km (8.93 mi) long with its deepest point reached 115 m (377 ft) above sea level (deeper than 33 m (108 ft) of old Qingdao Jiaozhou Bay Tunnel), covers 9.95 km (6.18 mi) in the sea section with the lowest point of the shield section enduring a water pressure of 0.96 MPa. The shield tunnel section of the northern mainline tunnel spanning 3.258 km (2.024 mi) long. The second Jiaozhou tunnel is designated for small and medium-sized cars to pass the tunnel.

As of July 2026, the tunnel construction is over 70% complete and is scheduled to be completed and commence operation in 2028. Once completed, it will further accelerate transportation connections between Qingdao and Huangdao and promote integrated development of the east and west banks of Jiaozhou Bay.

== History ==
The plans of Second Qingdao Jiaozhou Bay Tunnel was kicked off in 2011. In April 2020, the Second Jiaozhou Tunnel project was officially approved. In July 2020, Qingdao Guoxin Group won the concession rights bid and took full responsibility for the investment, construction, and operation of the Second Jiaozhou Tunnel project. Accordingly, the project adopts concession level, with construction period of 6 years and concession period for investment and construction of 30 years (excluding construction period). Even the construction period is shortened and the project is completed early than schedule, the project may enter the concession period ahead of schedule with the concession period remaining unchanged for 30 years.

Construction of the second Jiaozhou Bay Tunnel officially began on 29 October 2020.

On 14 July 2026, at 96 meters below the sea level in Jiaozhou Bay, the shield boring for the northern line of the second undersea tunnel project reached a milestone, marking a successful conclusion to the main tunnel shield boring.

== See also ==
- Qingdao Jiaozhou Bay Bridge
- Qingdao Jiaozhou Bay Tunnel
