= Cross-sea traffic ways =

Cross-sea traffic ways are vehicle or railroad traffic ways across the sea. Such traffic ways could include bridges or tunnels.

== Sea bridges ==
=== Existing sea bridges ===
- Anping Bridge (China)
- Donghai Bridge (China)
- Haicang Bridge (China)
- Hangzhou Bay Bridge (China)
- Hong Kong–Zhuhai–Macau Bridge (China)
- Jiangnanshan Bridge (China)
- Jiaozhou Bay Bridge and Jiaozhou Bay Tunnel (China)
- Jintang Bridge (China)
- Pingtan Strait Road–Rail Bridge (China)
- Xiamen Zhangzhou Bridge (China)
- Xihoumen Bridge (China)
- Zhanjiang Bay Bridge (China)
- Zhujiajian Strait Bridge (China)
- Øresund Bridge (Denmark-Sweden)
- Great Belt Bridge (Denmark)
- King Fahd Causeway (Saudi Arabia-Bahrain)
- Bandra–Worli Sea Link (India)
- Pamban Bridge (India)
- Mumbai Trans Harbour Link (India)
- China Maldives Friendship Bridge (Maldives)
- Chesapeake Bay Bridge–Tunnel (United States)
- Hampton Roads Bridge–Tunnel (United States)
- Monitor–Merrimac Memorial Bridge–Tunnel (United States)
- Golden Gate Bridge (United States)
- Overseas Highway (United States)
- Confederation Bridge (Canada)
- Tokyo Bay Aqua-Line (Japan)
- Michael Davitt Bridge (Ireland–Achill Island)
- Amur Bay Bridge (Russia)
- Kola Bay Bridge (Russia)
- Russky Bridge (Russia)
- Zolotoy Bridge (Russia)
- Muksalma Dam (Russia)
- Saint Petersburg Dam (Russia)
- Western High-Speed Diameter (Russia)
- Crimean Bridge (Russian-occupied Ukraine)
- Pelješac Bridge (Croatia)

=== Sea bridges under construction ===
- Shenzhen–Zhongshan Bridge (China)
- Versova–Bandra Sea Link (India)

=== Planned or proposed sea bridges ===
- Bohai Bay Bridge (China)
- Dahej Bhavnagar railway sea link bridge (India)
- Gibraltar Bridge (Spain–Morocco)
- Strait of Messina Bridge (Italy)
- Bridge of the Horns (Djibouti–Yemen)
- Bering Strait bridge (Russia–United States)
- Sakhalin bridge (Russia)
- Sunda Strait Bridge (Indonesia)
- Irish Sea Bridge (Great Britain–Ireland)
- Qatar Bahrain Causeway bridge (Qatar–Bahrain)
- Palk Strait Bridge (Sri Lanka–India)
- Worli-Haji Ali Sea Link (India)

== Former bridges ==
- Kerch railway bridge (Russian SFSR, Soviet Union)

== Sea tunnels ==
=== Existing sea tunnels ===
- Dalian Bay Subsea Tunnel (China)
- Qingdao Jiaozhou Bay Tunnel (China)
- Xiamen XiangAn Tunnel (China)
- Xiamen–Haicang Undersea Tunnel (China)
- Channel Tunnel (France-United Kingdom)
- Seikan Tunnel (Japan)

=== Sea tunnels under construction ===
- Second Jiaozhou Bay Subsea Tunnel (China)
- Shantou SuAi Bay Subsea Tunnel (China)
- Shenzhen Mawan Cross-Sea Tunnel (China)
- Xidian Bay Subsea Tunnel (China)
- Fehmarn Belt fixed link

=== Planned or proposed sea tunnels ===
- Bohai Strait tunnel (China)
- Japan–Korea Undersea Tunnel (Japan–Korea)
- Qiongzhou Strait Tunnel (China)
- Taiwan Strait Tunnel Project (China)
- Sakhalin Tunnel (Russia)

== Traffic dams ==
- Väinatamm (Saaremaa–Muhu)
