= Jiaozhou =

Jiaozhou may refer to:

- Jiaozhou Bay, a sea gulf in Qingdao, Shandong, China
- Jiaozhou City, a county-level city near the bay
- Jiaozhou (region), an ancient region which included modern North Vietnam, Guangxi, Guangdong, and Hainan
  - Jiaozhi, a commandery within the Jiaozhou region
