= Shandong Gaosu Group =

Chinese state-owned enterprise

Shandong Hi-Speed Group Corporation 山东高速集团有限公司
- Type: State-Owned Enterprise
- Industry: Transport
- Founded: 1997
- Headquarters: Jinan, People's Republic of China
- Area served: Shandong, People's Republic of China
- Key people: Chairman: Mr. Sun Liang
- Revenue: ▲US$ 36,744 million (2023)
- Net income: US$ 492 million (2023)
- Total assets: US$ 213.3 billion (2023)
- Number of employees: 56,432 (2023)
- Website: Shandong Hi-Speed Group Corporation

Shandong Hi-Speed Group Corporation or Shandong Gaosu Group (Chinese: 山东高速集团有限公司) (SDHS) is a solely state-owned enterprise in Jinan, China, owned by the Shandong Provincial People's Government. It is mainly engaged in investment, construction and operation of highways, expressways, bridges, railways, rail transits, harbours, shipping and logistics. It also sets foot in construction, building material, information, financing, real estate and other sectors related to its main business. In June 2011, SDHS opened the Jiaozhou Bay Bridge spanning more than 40 kilometers between Qingdao and Huangdao District in Shandong, making it the longest cross-sea bridge in the world.

SDHS has extended its business to more than 22 provinces domestically and 106 countries and regions. SDHS is operating and managing 2800 km of expressways and another 1127 km is under construction. It also operates and manages 586 km of local railways and 743 km is under construction. On behalf of the Provincial Government, SDHS has completed the investment and construction of the Shandong Section of Beijing-Shanghai Hi-Speed Railway. In 2017, SDHS reported profits of US$1.3 billion.

At the new starting point, the group will adhere to the spirit of the Fifth Plenary Session of the CPC Central Committee of the CPC and the 13th Five-Year Development Plan in Shandong Province as the guidance, take scientific development as the theme, transformation and upgrading as the mean, reform and innovation as the driving force, the share mechanism as the bond, the perfection of corporate governance structure as the key, the capital operation as the support, quality and efficiency as the purpose and the political core of the party as the guarantee to realize the "Hi-speed dream" of "Build the Hi-speed Group in China, Be World Top 500 and Enrich Staff".

== Corporate history ==
SDHS was originally incorporated with the approval of the Shandong Provincial People's Government in July 1997 as the Shandong Province Highway Limited Corporation. Since then SDHS has gone through a series of name changes as its ownership situation and corporate mission have evolved, changing first to the Shandong Province Highway, LLC in June 1999, and then to the Shandong Province Highway Group Company in January 2005, before adopting its present name in January 2008.

SDHS also possesses the ownership of 30 affiliated groups and companies, which includes:

- Shandong Hi-Speed Company Ltd (A representative of the blue chips of the listed companies with the largest assets in the field of highway and bridge engineering in China)
- Shandong Hi-Speed Road and Bridge Group Co Ltd (Largest listed provincial-level road and bridge engineering enterprise with special class construction qualification)
- China-Shandong Hi-Speed Financial Group (Listed in Hong Kong)
- Shandong Railway Construction and Investment Co Ltd
- China Shandong International Economic and Technical Cooperation Group Ltd
- Weihai City Commercial Bank (1st regional commercial bank in Shandong Province)
- Taishan Property and Casualty Insurance Co Ltd (1st nationwide property insurance entity registered in Shandong and with SDHS as the major shareholder)
- Qingdao Development Co Ltd (Constructed Qingdao Jiaozhou Bay Bridge - the longest cross-sea bridge in the world)

== Organization structure ==
=== Wholly owned subsidiary companies ===
- Shandong Hi-Speed Investment Holdings Limited
- China Shandong International Economics & Technical Cooperation Group, Ltd.,
- Shandong Hi-Speed Rail Transportation Group Co., Ltd.
- Shandong Hi-Speed Construction & Management Co., Ltd.
- Shandong Hi-Speed Logistics Co., Ltd.
- Shandong Hi-Speed Real Estate Group Co., Ltd.
- Shandong Hi-Speed Technology Development Group Co., Ltd.
- Shandong Hi-Speed Service Area Management Co., Ltd.
- Shandong Hi-Speed Sichuan Development Co., Ltd.
- Shandong Hi-Speed Qingdao Development Co., Ltd.
- Shandong Hi-Speed Materials Group Co., Ltd.
- Shandong Hi-Speed Cultural Media Co., Ltd.
- Shandong Hi-Speed Xinlian Payment Co., Ltd.
- Shandong Hi-Speed Yunnan Development Co., Ltd.
- Shandong Hi-Speed Hubei Development Co., Ltd.
- Shandong Hi-Speed Basketball Club Co., Ltd.
- Shandong Hi-Speed Nile Investment & Development Co., Ltd.
- Shandong Hi-Speed (SINGAPORE) Pte Ltd.
- Shandong Hi-Speed Penglai Development Co., Ltd.

=== Majority shareholding subsidiary companies ===
- Shandong Railway Construction Investment Co., Ltd.
- Shandong Hi-Speed Company Limited
- Shandong Hi-Speed Road and Bridge Group Co., Ltd.
- Weihai City Commercial Bank
- Ji'nan-Qingdao High-Speed Rail Co., Ltd.
- Lunan High Speed Railway Co., Ltd.
- Shandong Hi-Speed Information Engineering Co., Ltd.
- Shandong Hi-Speed Everbright Industrial Fund Management Co., Ltd.

=== Relative shareholding companies ===
- Shandong Marine Group Ltd.
- Taishan Property & Casualty Insurance Co., Ltd.
- China Shandong Hi-Speed Financial Group Limited

=== Joint stock companies ===
- Jinan International Airport Co., Ltd.
- Shandong Marine Shipping Co., Ltd.

== Industrial sectors ==
Since its foundation, SDHS has extended its business to more than 22 provinces domestically and 106 countries and regions. SDHS is active in various industrial sectors which includes:

1. Expressway construction and operation
Expressway operation is the major work and pillar of SDHS and its subsidiary - Shandong Hi-Speed Company Limited (A listed company with the largest assets in road and bridge sector in China), with a total of 2800 km of expressways under SDHS. The expressways include Ji'nan-Qingdao Expressway, Shandong Section of Beijing-Taipei Expressway, Weifang-Laiyang Expressway, Qihe-Xiajin Section of Qingdao-Yinchuan Expressway, Heze-Guanzhuang Expressway, Ji'nan-Laiwu Expressway, Weihai-Rushan Expressway, Jiaozhou Bay Ring Expressway, Ji'nan North Ring Section of Qingdao-Yinchuan Expressway, Qingdao Jiaozhou Bay Bridge, Linyi-Zaozhuang Expressway and Yantai-Haiyang Expressway in Shandong Province. Outside the province, SDHS controls Xuchang-Yuzhou Expressway and Xuchang-Bozhou Expressway in Henan Province, Leshan-Yibin Expressway and Leshan-Zigong Expressway in Sichuan Province, Suolongsi-Mengzi Expressway and Kunming Airport Expressway in Yunnan Province, Hengyang-Shaoyang Expressway in Hu'nan Province and Wuhan-Jingmen Expressway in Hubei Province, hence achieving its low cost expansion.

SDHS has other 1127 km expressways under construction, mainly including Weifang-Rizhao Expressway, Tai'an Dong'e Expressway, Longkou-Qingdao Expressway and the Extension Project of Northern Line of Ji'nan-Qingdao Expressway.

- Jiaozhou Bay Bridge

In June 2011, SDHS opened the Jiaozhou Bay Bridge near Qingdao, Shandong, after four years of construction and at a cost of more US$1.5 billion. Upon its completion, this bridge is reported to be the world's longest roadway bridge over water. Jiaozhou Bay Bridge was also awarded the "George S. Richardson Medal" - the world's highest international prize for bridges, in 2013.

2. Railway operation
SDHS has two railway investment and operation entities: Shandong Railway Construction Investment Co Ltd, which executes investors' responsibility on behalf of the government, and Shandong Hi-Speed Rail Transport Group Co Ltd.

The Beijing-Shanghai Hi-Speed Railway, Qingdao-Rongcheng Inter-city Railway and Shanxi Middle and South Railway with SDHS as a shareholder have been operational. SDHS also holds controlling interest of Dezhou-Longkou-Yantai Railway totalling 588 km and some national railway projects with investment from SDHS such as Huanghua-Dajiawa Railway, Shijiazhuang-Ji'nan Special Passenger Railway and Qingdao-Rizhao-Lianyungang Railway are under construction.

SDHS, as major shareholder, is also responsible for the construction of Ji'nan-Qingdao Hi-Speed Railway totalling 309 km in length and US$9.1 billion in investment and Lu'nan Hi-Speed Railway totalling 494 km and US$11.2 billion in investment.

The predecessor of Shandong Hi-Speed Rail Transportation Group Co., Ltd is Shandong Local Railway Bureau, which is responsible for investment, construction and operation of local railways and rail transits in Shandong Province. At present, it has been operating 586 km local railways like Dajiawa-Laizhou-Longkou Railway, Pinglan Railway and Shouguang-Zouping Railway, etc. and 743 km is under construction. The asset size and cargo traffic volume rank the top among the provincial-level local railway companies in China.

3. Logistics industry
Logistics is the emerging industrial sector which SDHS attaches great importance to and it is also one of its pillar business approved by The State-owned Assets Supervision and Administration Committee of Shandong Province. Its subsidiary, Shandong Hi-Speed Logistics Co Ltd, is the flagship enterprise of logistics industry in Shandong Province, with a registered capital of US$0.8 billion. It is ranked the largest in Shandong Province and among the top in China in the same industry. Its main business includes logistics infrastructure such as ports and logistics parks, integration of logistics, finance and trade, inter-city and urban platform of standard container logistics distribution and special logistics distribution etc.

The Shandong High Speed West Coast Wisdom Logistics Industrial Park will be an online trading platform and logistics entities under the line, the logistics industry to build an O2O demonstration platform. SDHS also operates an Inter-city platform of standard container logistics distribution. Under SDHS, the International Automobile Industrial City in Qingdao is dedicated to form a platform of automobile industrial chain.

4. Port shipping
Ports and shipping is another key business os SDHS to make full use of strategic opportunities of the Development Plan of Shandong Peninsula Blue Economic Zone and Development Plan of Yellow River Delta Efficient Eco-economic Zone and establish its macro-transport system.

Being a shareholder in Bohai Ferry Co., Ltd., SDHS invested US$0.3 billion to develop Weifang Port. SDHS is also a major shareholder of Shandong Marine Group Ltd., and it is the core platform of investment and financing, incubation and industrialization platform of oceanic technology achievements and integration platform of emerging strategic oceanic industry for Shandong Province to implement the strategy of Blue Economic Zone.

With the total registered capital of US$0.5 billion, annual operation revenue of US$11 billion, total assets of US$3.2 billion, Shandong Ocean Investment Co., Ltd. is mainly engaged in investment, operation and management of ocean transport and logistics, marine equipment manufacturing, oceaneering construction ocean energy and mineral resources, marine fishery, marine biotechnology and marine eco-environment protection etc.

5. Finance and insurance
Finance and insurance is the largest business sector of SDHS.

- Weihai City Commercial Bank

SDHS's subsidiary ranks among the joint-equity commercial banks with the greatest development potentials on China. Opened on August 1, 1997, it has over 80 branches in cities such as Ji'nan, Tianjin, Qingdao, Yantai, Dezhou, Linyi, Ji'ning, Weifang and Dongying, etc. In recent years, the annual growth rate of all its development indicators reaches over 30%. By far, the total assets of the bank exceeded US$28.8 billion and net profit is more than US$0.23 billion. It has also been honoured successively with "Golden Dragon Prize for Small and Medium Enterprises", "Chinese Best Retail Banks".

SDHS cooperates with China Everbright Limited to set an industrial investment fund and also holds, as major shareholder, Taishan Property and Casualty Insurance Co., Ltd which is the first nationwide property insurance entity registered in Shandong Province. SDHS is also a major shareholder of CSFG.

With China Everbright Limited, SDHS has established SDHS Everbright Industrial Investment Funds with the expected financing amount of US$9.1 billion and is also preparing for setting up Shandong Province Urbanisation Investment Funds with the capital raising amount of US$3.6 billion.

- Shandong Hi-speed Investment Fund Management Company

Shandong Hi-Speed Investment Fund Management Company is one of the 122 private equity funds in China, with the AUM of over RMB$10 billion, topping all the other peer companies in Shandong Province.

7. Building and construction
Building and construction is the pillar business of SDHS.

SDHS's subsidiary Shandong Hi-Speed Road and Bridge Group Co Ltd was listed on the stock market in 2013 and has completed construction of 200 highways of different grades domestically and abroad, totalling over 5000 km. Shandong Hi-Speed Road and Bridge Group Co., Ltd is the only one in Shandong Province that has the Special Class (Class 1+) Qualification of General Constructing for Highway Works.

It has been awarded the National Golden Prize for Quality Project, Zhan Tianyou Prize for China Civil Engineering Construction an Luban Prize - the highest national architectural engineering prize, numerous times.

- Shandong Hi-Speed Jiaozhou Bay Bridge

Totalling 41.58 km in length, the US$1.5 billion project is invested in and constructed by SDHS. It solves the world-level technological difficulties of high salinity and alkalinity, frequent corrosion and freezing and creates 21 "New Records by Chinese Enterprises". In 2013, the bridge was awarded "George S. Richardson Medal" by the International Bridge Conference (IBC), which is the highest international prize for bridge projects in China. It is also recognized as the longest sea-crossing bridge by Guinness and ranks among the "World Splendid Bridges" on Forbes. Its original "underwater non-subsealing concrete pouring jacket technology" won the second prize of National Technology Invention, which was the only scientific achievement winning this honour in China's transportation industry in recent years.

8. Resources and real estate
Resources and real estate are key businesses of the macro-transport industry system of SDHS, and in recent years, these two sectors have developed quickly mainly in projects of material supply, real estate development and city operation with little investment and quick results.

SDHS has several mines such as the natural rock asphalt mine in Qingchuan County of Sichuan Province and the zinc and tin mine in Xiaogu Mountain of Inner Mongolia. Modified asphalt has been exported to Ethiopia and utilized on expressway projects. Hainan New Petrochemical Material Base jointly invested by SDHS and American Heritage Group will have an annual output of US$6.1 billion when operations begin.

In alliance with Greentown and Evergrande, the leading enterprises in real estate, SDSH has successfully developed several high-quality real estate projects such as SDHS West Coast Center in the West Coast of Qingdao. The center, defined as a 5A office building with luxurious apartments, will be built as a high quality complex integrating functions like office and recreation spaces.

9. International business
SDHS has extended its business to 106 countries and regions, with a total turnover of US$15.2 billion.

- China Culture Center

Slated to open in February 2019 in Belgrade, the Chinese Cultural Center will occupy an area of over 32 300 m^{2}, making it one of the largest cultural centres in the world and the first project of its kind in the Baltic region. On June 16, 2016, China's paramount leader Xi Jinping and Serbian President Tomislav Nikolic attended the Foundation Laying Ceremony for the project.

- Toulouse Airport Project

In 2014, SDHS together with FPI purchased 49.99% shares of Toulouse Airport which is the fourth largest passenger airport and the second largest freight airport in France. This is this first acquisition of foreign for a Chinese company.

In July 2015, Premier Li Keqiang visited Toulouse in France and stressed that Toulouse Airport Project must be well operated as strategic investment.

- Juba-Rumbec-Bentiu Road Upgrading Project

The E763 expressway project in South Sudan is the longest overseas road project (more than 1000 km) with the largest investment undertaken by Chinese enterprises.

== Corporate recognition ==
In 2017, SDHS reported a registered capital of US$3 billion, annual operation revenue of $9.1 billion and total profits of $1.3 billion. Its asset value of $83.3 billion has also topped all Shandong Province-run enterprises and all Chinese enterprises of the same industry. According to the Ranking List of World Brand Lab, SDHS was awarded the 146th place among China's 500 Most Valuable Brands in 2017, with a brand value of an estimated US$4.17 billion. The company was also ranked among "China Top 500 Companies", for the 10th consecutive year.

SDHS has been awarded with 41 ministerial scientific awards, especially with two Second Class Prizes of National Scientific and Technology Progress Awards, one Second Class Prize of National Technology Invention Award.

== See also ==
- Jiaozhou Bay Bridge
