= Wenyingzhuangia fucanilytica =

Scientific classification
- Domain: Bacteria
- Kingdom: Pseudomonadati
- Phylum: Bacteroidota
- Class: Flavobacteriia
- Order: Flavobacteriales
- Family: Flavobacteriaceae
- Genus: Wenyingzhuangia
- Species: W. fucanilytica

Binomial name
- Wenyingzhuangia fucanilytica Chen et al. 2016

Type strain
- CZ1127

Bacterium

Wenyingzhuangia fucanilytica is a Gram-negative, strictly aerobic, rod-shaped and non-motile bacterium from the genus of Wenyingzhuangia which has been isolated from seawater from the coast of Jiaozhou Bay.
