= Huangdao District City Balcony =

Recreation area in Qingdao, China

Coordinates: 35°52′07″N 120°03′01″E

Huangdao District City Balcony is a public outdoor recreation site in Huangdao District, Qingdao, China, comprising an urban park, beach, and various structures. It was completed and opened in July 2012, with a total area of 1075 acres, after an investment of 1 billion yuan. It comprises the park's Landscape Area, the first bathing beach of Lingshan Bay, the Central Lake and the civic Cultural Square, the Cultural Exhibition Park, and the Dalu River Landscape Bridge. Set culture, leisure, sports, sea viewing and other functions in one, free and open to the public.

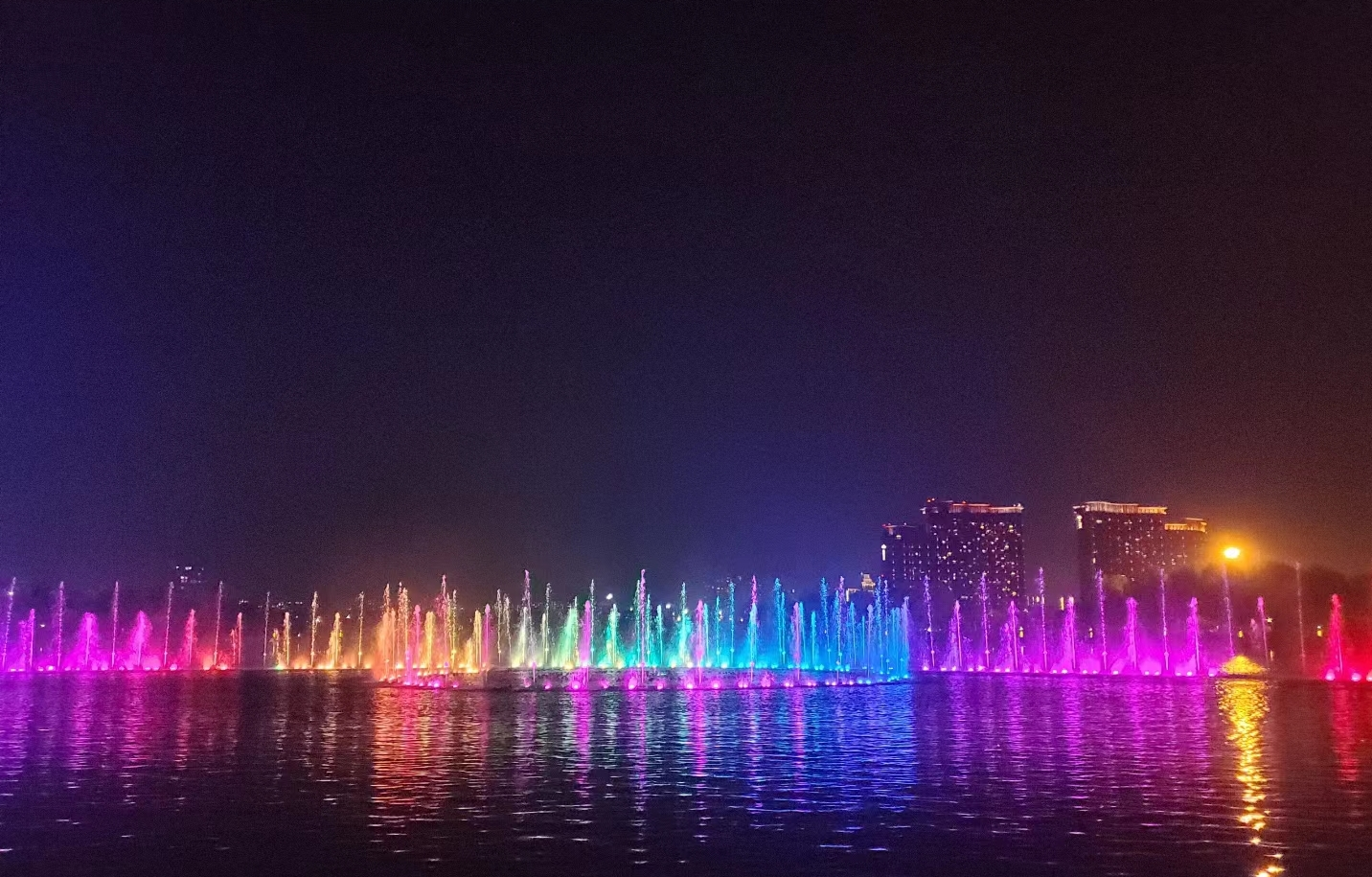
City Balcony fountain

In July 2014, the scenic spot officially passed the comprehensive review and acceptance of the China 4A level tourist attractions review group. During holidays, the number of tourists to the scenic area will skyrocket, and the park has become a famous scenic spot in Huangdao District.

== Description ==
The coastal part of the site is the Lingshan Bay Bathing Beach. The beach began renovation in March 2011 and was completed in July. It has a natural, high-quality beach of 1,980 meters, an area of 285,000 square meters, and can accommodate more than 100,000 passengers daily. It is the largest natural, high-quality beach in Huangdao District. In the project's construction, the original stone embankment of the seaside was removed, the shoreline was retreated by 50-100 meters, and the sand was dug out below 3 meters outside the shoreline and thrown to the inside of the shoreline to form the current beach. The external alkali treatment was completed, and various plants suitable for coastal growth were planted. The bath has built three public toilets, three changing rooms, and seven free outdoor flushing points.

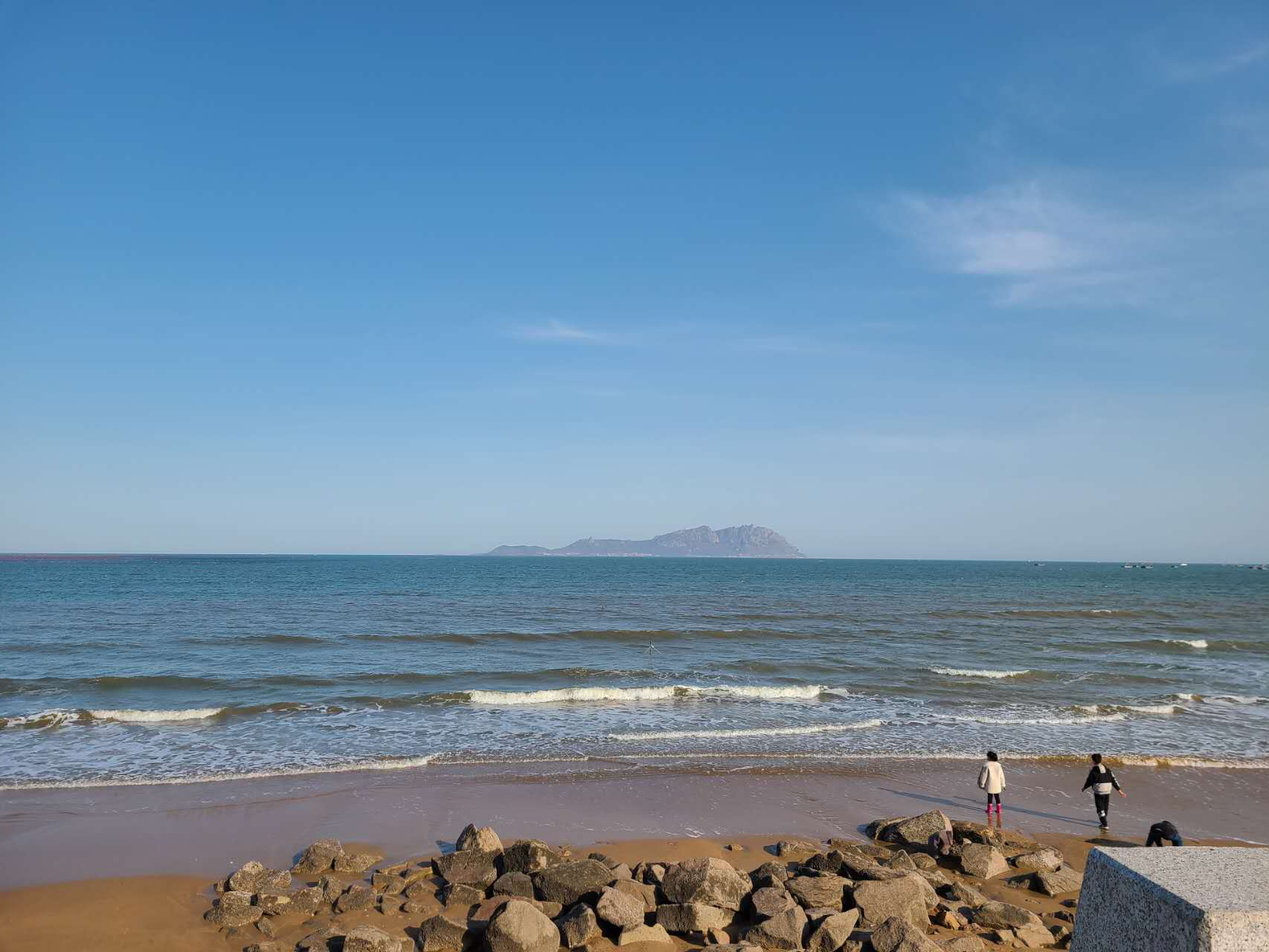
City balcony on the beach

From the beach to the north is the Central Lake Square, covering an area of 278,000 square meters, by the citizens honest, waterfront Square, children's Square, and the central lake district. The paved area of the court is about 70,000 square meters, the waterarea is 82,000 square meters, and the green space is 115,000 square meters, which can simultaneously accommodate 60,000 people for leisure activities. At present, the public square has planted nearly 5,000 trees of more than ten kinds of large size trees such as metanoia, Patagonia, ginkgo, Chinese locust, cherry, Mongolian oak, nearly 1,000 shrubs such as crape myrtle and magnolia, and 378,000 shrubs of various types, completing the lawn and ground planting 126,000 square meters.

As of 2023, City Balcony has successfully held a series of performances, such as the "Zui Mei Lingshan Bay" of the World City Music Festival, the China International "Auto Group", the Qingdao International Blueberry Festival and the China International Blueberry Conference, the two China University Student Beach Volleyball Championships, the "Dream Lingshan Bay" tourism season, the third Asian University Student Beach Volleyball Championship, and the World Bikini Model Contest global Finals List large-scale cultural, sports, trade and social welfare activities.
