= Jiaolai Plain =

Plain of Shandong, China

- Lai Prefecture in 1820, roughly the extension of Jiaolai Pain
- Chinese: 胶莱平原
- Country: China
- Altitude: Mostly about 50m

Jiaolai Plain (simplified Chinese: 胶莱平原; traditional Chinese: 膠萊平原; pinyin: Jiāolái píngyuán) is a plain located in the south central part of Shandong Province between the middle hills (中山丘陵) and low hills (低山丘陵) and the low hills of Jiaodong. Its southern and northern tips are surrounded by Jiaozhou Bay and Laizhou Bay respectively.

== Overview ==
Jiaolai Plain is mainly formed by the alluvial flow of rivers such as Huai River, Bailang River (白浪河), Jiaolai River (胶莱河) and Dagu River. Its average elevation is around 50 meters. The plain mainly includes most of Weifang and the northern part of Qingdao.

Jialai Plain is one of the major arable land concentration areas in Shandong. According to modern geographical studies, the plain was flooded by seawater for a long time more than 4,000 years ago.
