= Yinghai =

Yinghai may refer to:

- Yinghai, Beijing (瀛海地区), area and town of Daxing District
- Yinghai Subdistrict, Jiaozhou (营海街道), Shandong
