= Xuejiadao Subdistrict =

Subdistrict of Qingdao, China

Coordinates: 35°57′42″N 120°13′02″E

Xuejiadao Subdistrict (Chinese: 薛家岛街道) is a subdistrict under the jurisdiction of Huangdao District, Qingdao City, Shandong Province, China.

== Administrative division ==
Xuejiadao Subdistrict manages the following areas:

One community, three communities, four communities, five communities, six communities, Landong Community, Xindao Community, Dongshan Community, Xishan Community, Bao House community, Xiangyang Community, Anzi community, Dawa community, Lujiaowan Community, Liujiadao Community, Shigou Community, Shilingzi Community, and Dongjiahe Community, Gujiadao Community, Yumingtsui Community, Nanying Community, Yantai Qian Community, Nantun Community, Beitun Community, Zhucha Island community, Nanzhuang I Community, Nanzhuang II community, Wawuzhuang Community, Beizhuang I community, Beizhuang II community, Houchawan community, Ganshui Bay Community, Bowan community, Zhujiang Road community, Xiaoshan Road Community and Jialingjiang East Road community.

== Historical ==
Thirty-four years of the Republic of China (1945), the territory belongs to Zhushan County.

In November of the same year, it was transferred to Jiao County.

In September of the 35th year of the Republic of China (1946), it belonged to Jiaonan County.

In October 1976, it was classified as Changwei District. In January 1979, it was classified as Huangdao District, Qingdao City.

In 1984, Xuejiadao People's Commune was abolished, and Xuejiadao Town was established.

In 1993, the Qingdao Economic and Technological Development Zone and Huangdao District system was integrated.

In 1994, it was renamed Xuejiadao Subdistrict.

== Population ==
At the end of 2011, the population of the Xuejiadao Subdistrict was 71,169..

== Economic development ==
In 2020, Xuejiadao Subdistrict will achieve district-level public budget revenue of 1.54 billion yuan, fixed asset investment of 6.42 billion yuan, the output value of industrial enterprises above the designated size of 15.12 billion yuan, and the output value of the Service industry of 3.07 billion yuan.
