= Wenyingzhuangia gracilariae =

Scientific classification
- Domain: Bacteria
- Kingdom: Pseudomonadati
- Phylum: Bacteroidota
- Class: Flavobacteriia
- Order: Flavobacteriales
- Family: Flavobacteriaceae
- Genus: Wenyingzhuangia
- Species: W. gracilariae

Binomial name
- Wenyingzhuangia gracilariae Yoon et al. 2015

Type strain
- N5DB13-4

Bacterium

Wenyingzhuangia gracilariae is a Gram-negative, strictly aerobic, rod-shaped and non-motile bacterium from the genus of Wenyingzhuangia which has been isolated from the alga Gracilaria vermiculophylla from the beach of Sodegaura.
