= Tieshan Subdistrict, Qingdao =

Tieshan Subdistrict 铁山街道
- Subdistrict
- Location in Shandong Tieshan Subdistrict (China)
- Coordinates: 35°54′6″N 119°55′49″E
- Country: People's Republic of China
- Province: Shandong
- Prefecture-level city: Qingdao
- District: Huangdao District
- Time zone: UTC+8 (China Standard)

Tieshan Subdistrict (simplified Chinese: 铁山街道; traditional Chinese: 鐵山街道; pinyin: Tiěshān Jiēdào) is a subdistrict in Huangdao District, Qingdao, Shandong, China. As of 2020, it administers the following 43 villages:

- Zhangcang Village (张仓村)
- Hanjia Village (韩家村)
- Liumeijiazhuang Village (刘梅家庄村)
- Bulingtou Village (埠岭头村)
- Qianshigou Village (前石沟村)
- Xinxiazhuang Village (新下庄村)
- Qianxinzhuang Village (前辛庄村)
- Houxinzhuang Village (后辛庄村)
- Liujiada Village (刘家大村)
- Qianjilin Village (前吉林村)
- Houjilin Village (后吉林村)
- Biejia Village (别家村)
- Dongfanghong Village (东方红村)
- Xiaopingling Village (小平岭村)
- Dapingling Village (大平岭村)
- Bing Village (丙村)
- Dongnanzhuang Village (东南庄村)
- Citang Village (祠堂村)
- Shanliujiazhuang Village (山刘家庄村)
- Caochengshan Village (曹城山村)
- Xujiada Village (徐家大村)
- Daxiazhuang Village (大下庄村)
- Xibeizhuang Village (西北庄村)
- Huangnixiang Village (黄泥巷村)
- Dunshang Village (墩上村)
- Shanggou Village (上沟村)
- Dongnanya Village (东南崖村)
- Mocheng'an Village (墨城安村)
- Xinxing Village (辛兴村)
- Lijiadianzi Village (李家店子村)
- Wangjiagou Village (王家沟村)
- Zhaojia Village (赵家村)
- Jinzhukeng Village (金猪坑村)
- Miaojiahe Village (苗家河村)
- Zhujiayuan Village (朱家园村)
- Dayujia Village (大于家村)
- Songjiadianzi Village (宋家店子村)
- Xiaoyujia Village (小于家村)
- Henan Village (河南村)
- Xinhe Village (新河村)
- Zhengjiamiao Village (郑家庙村)
- Changqing Village (长青村)
- Houshigou Village (后石沟村)

== See also ==
- List of township-level divisions of Shandong
