= Wenyingzhuangia marina =

Scientific classification
- Domain: Bacteria
- Kingdom: Pseudomonadati
- Phylum: Bacteroidota
- Class: Flavobacteriia
- Order: Flavobacteriales
- Family: Flavobacteriaceae
- Genus: Wenyingzhuangia
- Species: W. marina

Binomial name
- Wenyingzhuangia marina Liu et al. 2014

Type strain
- D1

Bacterium

Wenyingzhuangia marina is a Gram-negative, strictly aerobic and heterotrophic bacterium from the genus of Wenyingzhuangia which has been isolated from a recirculating mariculture system from Tianjin.
