= Zangma =

Town in Huangdao, Qingdao, China

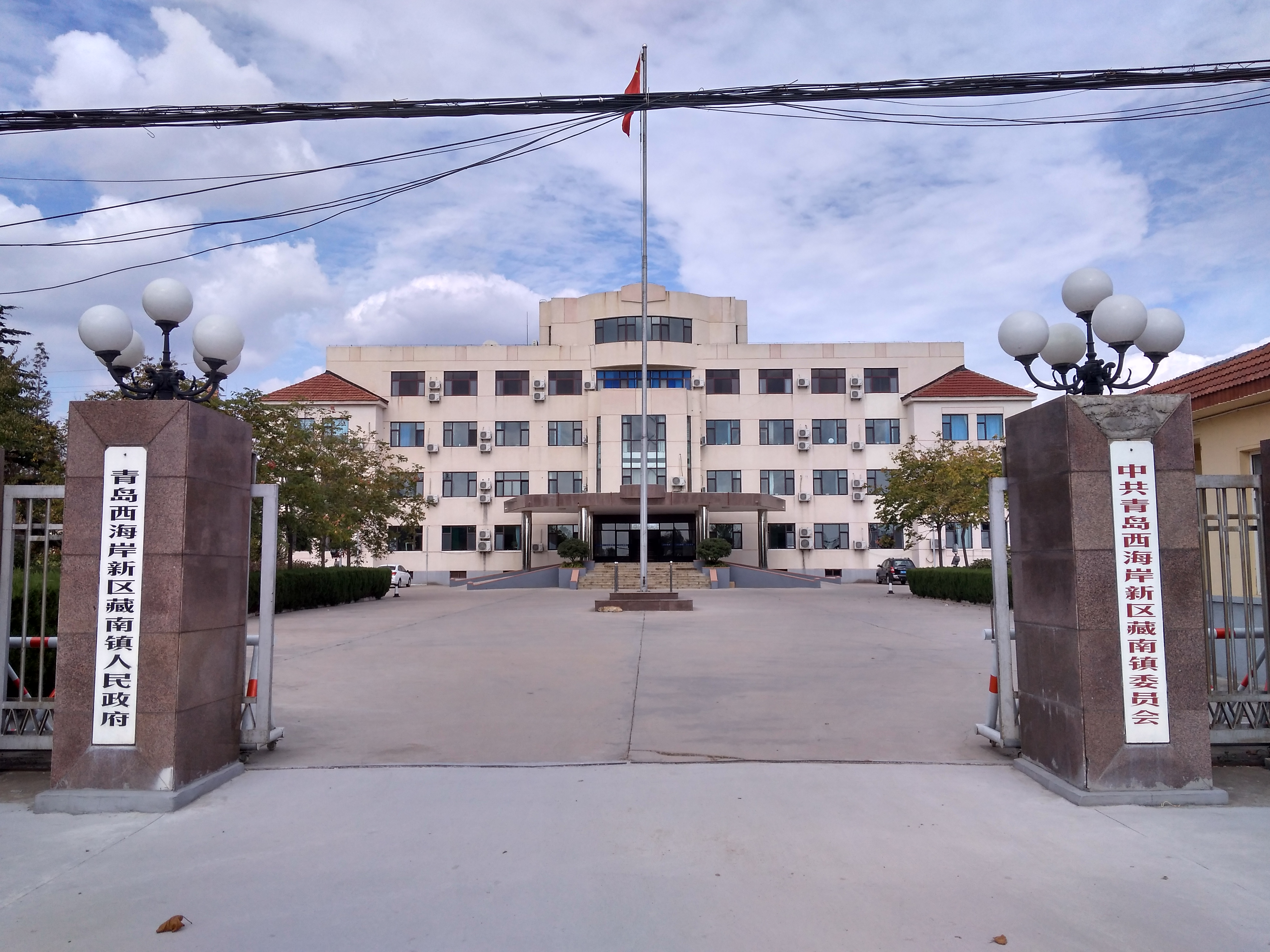
People's Government of Zangnan Town (now Zangma Town), West Coast New Area, Qingdao

Zangma Town (藏马镇) is a town under the jurisdiction of Huangdao District, Qingdao City, Shandong Province, China. Originally named "Zangnan Town", it was renamed to "Zangma Town" on November 7, 2019.

== Administrative division ==
Jurisdiction of the following districts:

Henghechuan village, Shangdingjiawa village, Damajiatuan village, Xiaomajiatuan village, Panjiazhuang village, Liujiazhuang village, Mowang Village, Mijiazhuang village, Wawu village, Tangjiazhuang village, Xiaolingzi village, Sunjiatun Village, Dingjiaohu village, Xiadingjiawa Village, Yaxia village, Yashang Village, Xinan Village, Hexi Village, Gaogezhuang Village, Zengjiaguzhuang Village, Changqian Village, Hujiazhuang village, Zangjia Village, Dingjiasongyuan Village, Hejigou Village, Wangjiaguanzhuang Village, Dingjiaguanzhuang Village, Yujiaguzhuang Village, West Douya Village, East Douya Village, Heya Village, Fanjiawa village, Hanjiao Village, Lingxitou Village, Lingnan Village, Liubutuan Village, Daliujiazhuang Village, Hougou Village, Zhaojiagou Village, Malan Village, Qimudi village, Huangjiaying village and Liuheqiao Village.

== Historical reform ==
In the 34th year of the Republic of China (1945) in December is a Zangma County Poli town.

In November 1993, it was renamed Zangnan Town.

In January 2001, six villages under the jurisdiction of Zhaili Town were transferred to Zangnan Town.

In October 2019, with the approval of the Shandong Provincial People's Government, Zangnan Town was renamed Zangma Town. As of October 2021, Zangma Town has jurisdiction over nine administrative villages.

== Geographical environment ==
Zangma Town is located in the southwest of Huangdao District, south by the town of Poli, Langya Town, west and Dachun town, northeast and Zhangjialou Subdistrict, the administrative area of 88.3 square kilometres.

== Population ==
At the time of China's sixth census in 2010, Zangma had a population of 26,388. There were 9,529 households, with an average of 2.76 persons per household. There were 3,695 children under 14, accounting for 14.00% of the total population. The population aged between 15 and 64 was 18,467, accounting for 69.98% of the total population. There were 4,226 older adults aged 65 and above, accounting for 16.01% of the total population. There were 13296 males, accounting for 50.38% of the total population. Females totalled 13,092, accounting for 49.61% of the total population. Among the local population, 24,958 people, or 94.58%, have local household registration.

== Government contact information ==
Contact number: 0532-84176113

Call 0532-84176113 for complaints

Zip Code 266409

The fax number is 0532-84176013

Web site http://www.xihaian.gov.cn/zwgk/jzgk/zmz/gkzn/

E-mail Cn84176103@163.com

== Head of town government ==
Yu Yang: Town party Secretary, presiding over the overall work of the town Party committee.

Zhou Ruibin: Deputy town party Secretary Party Committee, mayor, presiding over the overall work of the town government.

Ding Xinchun: Presiding over the presidium of the town's People's Congress. In charge of Zangmashan service guarantee, town planning and construction work. Responsible units: Service support Office, town and village construction service center.
