= Jiaonan =

Jiaonan 胶南市
- County-level city of China
- 1946–2012
- History
  - Established: 1946
  - Disestablished: 1 December 2012
Succeeded by
Huangdao District
- Today part of: Part of Huangdao District, Qingdao

Jiaonan (simplified Chinese: 胶南; traditional Chinese: 膠南; pinyin: Jiāonán) was a former county and county-level city under the administration of Qingdao, Shandong province, China, located in the southwestern portion of Qingdao along the Yellow Sea coast. In 1945, as Zhushan County (Chinese: 珠山縣; pinyin: Zhūshān Xiàn) it was carved from Jiao County and Qingdao City, and in 1946, renamed as Jiaonan County, deriving its name from its southern location relative to Jiaozhou Bay. In 1990, it was upgraded to a county-level city. Jiaonan has 7 subdistricts and 11 towns. In December 2012, it was merged into Huangdao District.

== Twin towns ==
Jiaonan is twinned with:

- Nowy Sącz, Poland
