= Wenyingzhuangia =

Scientific classification
- Domain: Bacteria
- Kingdom: Pseudomonadati
- Phylum: Bacteroidota
- Class: Flavobacteriia
- Order: Flavobacteriales
- Family: Flavobacteriaceae
- Genus: Wenyingzhuangia; Liu et al. 2014

Type species
- Wenyingzhuangia marina

Species
- W. aestuarii; W. fucanilytica; W. gracilariae; W. heitensis; W. marina

Genus of bacteria

Wenyingzhuangia is a genus of bacteria from the family Flavobacteriaceae. Wenyingzhuangia is named after the microbiologist and mycologist Wen-Ying Zhuang.
