= Wenyingzhuangia aestuarii =

Scientific classification
- Domain: Bacteria
- Kingdom: Pseudomonadati
- Phylum: Bacteroidota
- Class: Flavobacteriia
- Order: Flavobacteriales
- Family: Flavobacteriaceae
- Genus: Wenyingzhuangia
- Species: W. aestuarii

Binomial name
- Wenyingzhuangia aestuarii Yoon and Kasai 2016

Type strain
- MN1-138

Bacterium

Wenyingzhuangia aestuarii is a Gram-negative, strictly aerobic, rod-shaped and non-motile bacterium from the genus of Wenyingzhuangia which has been isolated from water from the Heita river in Japan.
