= Wenyingzhuangia heitensis =

Scientific classification
- Domain: Bacteria
- Kingdom: Pseudomonadati
- Phylum: Bacteroidota
- Class: Flavobacteriia
- Order: Flavobacteriales
- Family: Flavobacteriaceae
- Genus: Wenyingzhuangia
- Species: W. heitensis

Binomial name
- Wenyingzhuangia heitensis Yoon and Kasai 2015

Type strain
- H-MN17

Bacterium

Wenyingzhuangia heitensis is a Gram-negative, strictly aerobic, rod-shaped and non-motile bacterium from the genus of Wenyingzhuangia which has been isolated from seawater from Japan.
