= Dagu River =

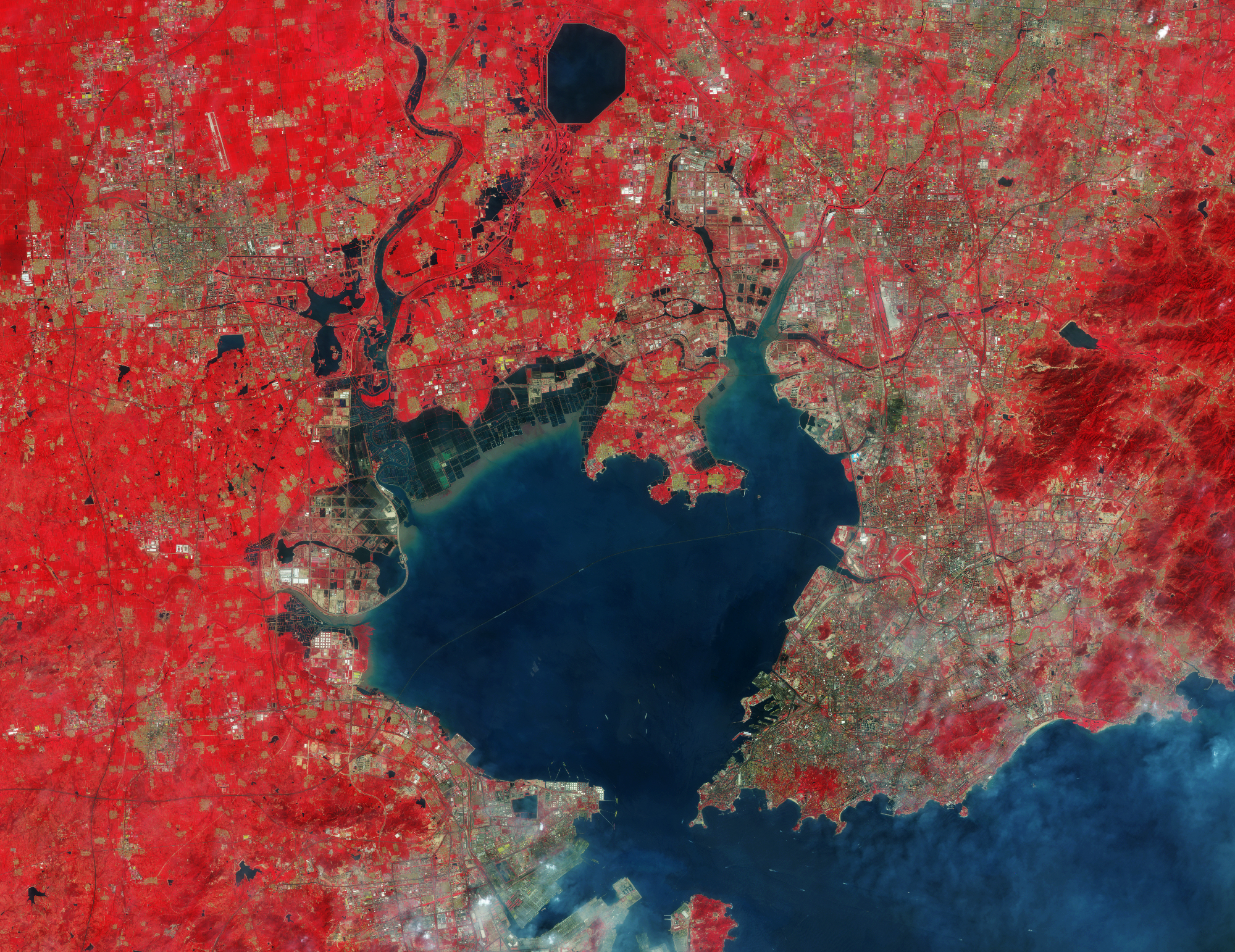
- The Dagu River which flows into the Jiaozhou Bay is clearly visible in this satellite image of Qingdao
- Native name: 大沽河 (Chinese)

Location
- Country: People's Republic of China
- Province: Shandong Province

Physical characteristics
- Mouth
  - coordinates: 36°10′40″N 120°07′48″E
- Length: 180 kilometers

The Dagu River (Chinese: 大沽河; pinyin: Dàgū Hé) is a 180-km-long river in Shandong province, China, originating from Mount Fu (阜山) in Zhaoyuan, Shandong and emptying into the Jiaozhou Bay in Qingdao. It has a drainage area of 6131.3 km^{2} and is responsible for over 85% of the fresh water supply to the Jiaozhou Bay.
