= Poli town =

Town in Qingdao, Shandong, China

Coordinates: 35°42′00″N 119°46′10″E

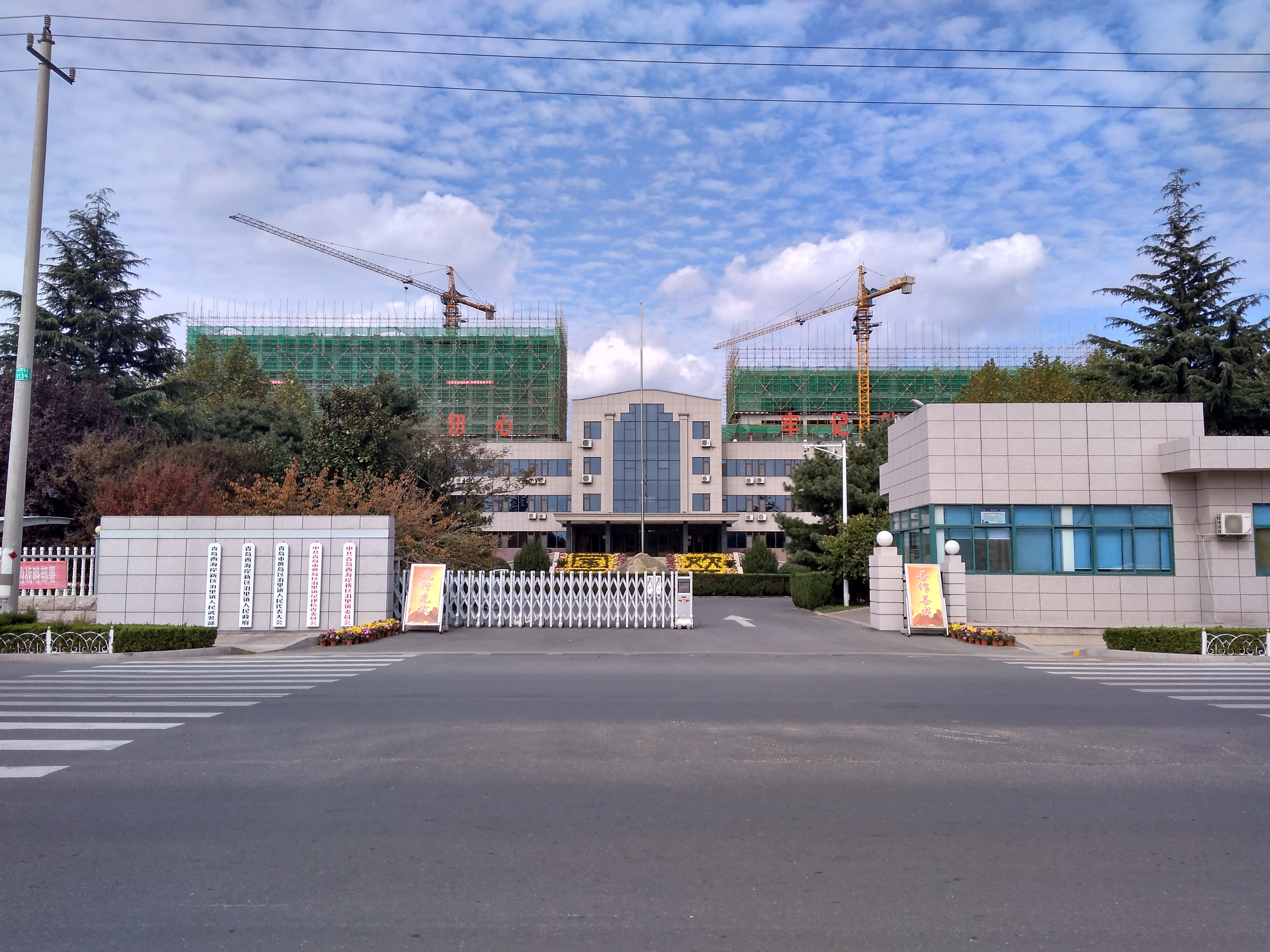
Qingdao west coast New District Poli Town people's government

Poli Town (Chinese: 泊里镇) is a town under the jurisdiction of Huangdao District, Qingdao City, in the Chinese province of Shandong. It is one of 23 key towns with a planned population of 50,000 to 100,000. Poli Town is ranked 91st in the list of China's Top 100 towns in 2021.

== History ==
In July 1949, the thirty-eighth year of the Republic of China, the Poli District was renamed Third District. In 1955, it was renamed Poli. In 1956, Zangma County was merged into Jiaonan County as Poli District.

In March 1958, Poli District was divided into Poli, Xiaochang and Yokogawa townships. In September, three municipalities were merged to form a satellite Commune, which was later changed to Pori Commune.

In March 1984, it was renamed Poli.

In January 2001, Xinyang Town was merged into Poli Town.

== Administration ==
Poli town has jurisdiction over many villages. These include:

- Poli River East village
- Poli River West village
- Poli Henan village
- Poli Hebei village
- Sunjiazhuang village
- Zhangjiazhuang village
- Gaojiazhuang village
- Majiazhuang village
- Dongxinzhuang village
- Dongjia Xiaozhuang village
- Yinjia village
- Sanhe village
- Shiling village
- Cui village
- Qiujiazhuang village
- Jiangjiazhuang village
- Chengjiazhuang village
- Weijia village
- Qiansongyuan village
- post-Songyuan village
- Lei Shi village
- Mijiazhuang village
- Dongfengjia village
- River Huangjiazhuang village
- Dongdazhuang village
- Yingshang village
- Xiaozhuang village
- Fengtai village
- Qiwan village
- Sanniugou village
- Yaotou One village
- Yaotou two villages
- Yaotou three villages
- Yaotou four villages
- Muguan Island village
- Zhujiahe village
- Caoqiao village
- Fengjiazhuang village
- Cui Jiatanzi village
- Jijia village
- Xiaoliujiazhuang village
- Xiaowangjia village
- Xiaotashan village
- Xinyang one village
- Xinyang two villages
- Xinyang three villages
- Liushudi village
- Shalingzi village
- Xiaotan village
- Shiya village
- Lingqiantou village
- Dongzhuang village
- Xizhuang village
- Nanzhuang village
- Wanya village
- Miaodong village
- Miahou village
- Shangzhuang village under the cliff
- Xujiaguanzhuang village
- Caiyuan village
- Qiancaochang village
- Houcaochang village
- Yingli village
- Wangshan village
- Daliao village
- Zhujiazhuang village
- Haidaizhuang village
- Jiatan village
- Gengjiaran village
- Shaojiaran village
- Miajialing village
- Dalan village
- LAN village Temple village
- LAN village

== Demographics ==
At the time of China's 2010 census, the town had a population of 61,853, divided among 21,093 households, with an average of 2.80 persons per household. 8,692 children under the age of 14 accounted for 14% of the population. The population aged 15–64 was 44,024, accounting for 71.2% of the total population. 9,137 people were aged 65 and above, accounting for 14.8% of the population. 31,091 males accounted for 50.3% of the population.The population with local hukou is 56,635, accounting for 91.6%.

== Transport ==
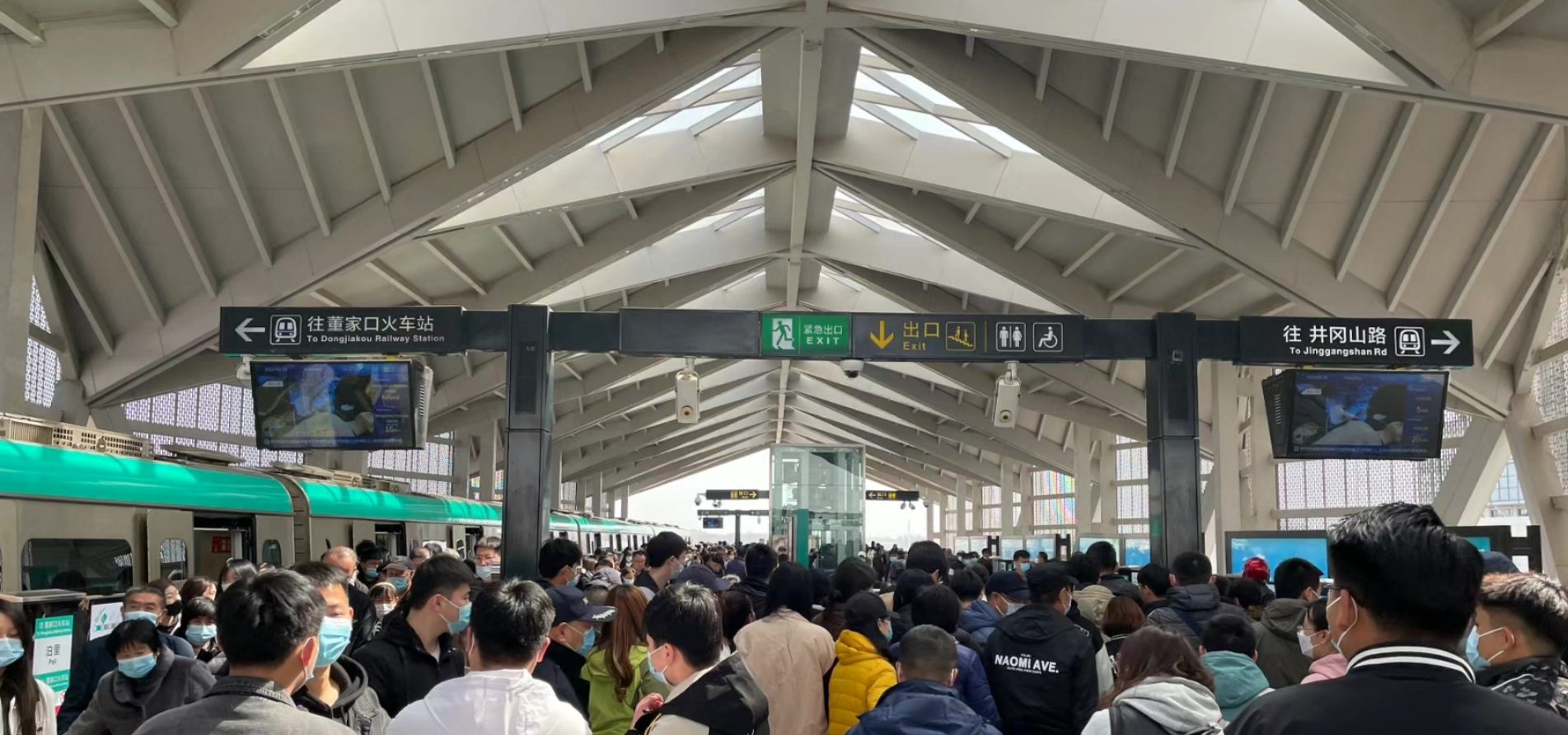
Poli Station of Qingdao Metro Line 13

Dongjiakou port is a Class A open water port with sea routes to more than 180 countries and regions.

Shen-Hai Expressway, Dong-Liang Expressway, 204 National Highway, 334 Provincial Highway support automotive transport.

Binhai Avenue and Qingyan Railway and Shu-Hong Kong Railway offer rail transport. Dongjiakou Station on Qingyan Railway is located in the town, which is adjacent to Dongjiakou Railway Station, the terminus of Qingdao Metro Line 13.

Poli Town is 75 km from Qingdao Jiaodong International Airport and 60 km from Rizhao Shanzihe Airport.
