= Jiaozhou City =

County-level city in Qingdao, Shandong, China

Jiaozhou 胶州市
- County-level city
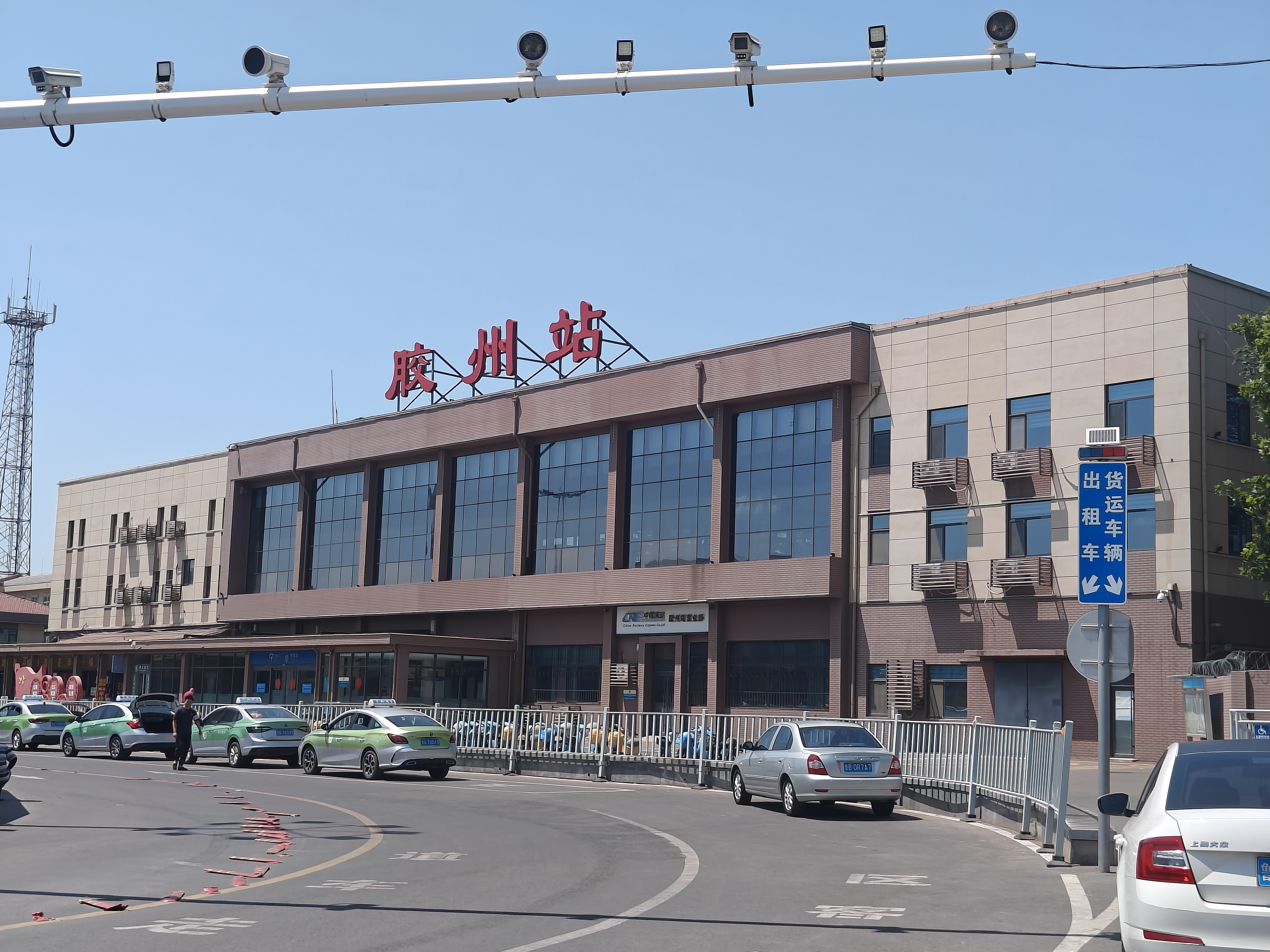
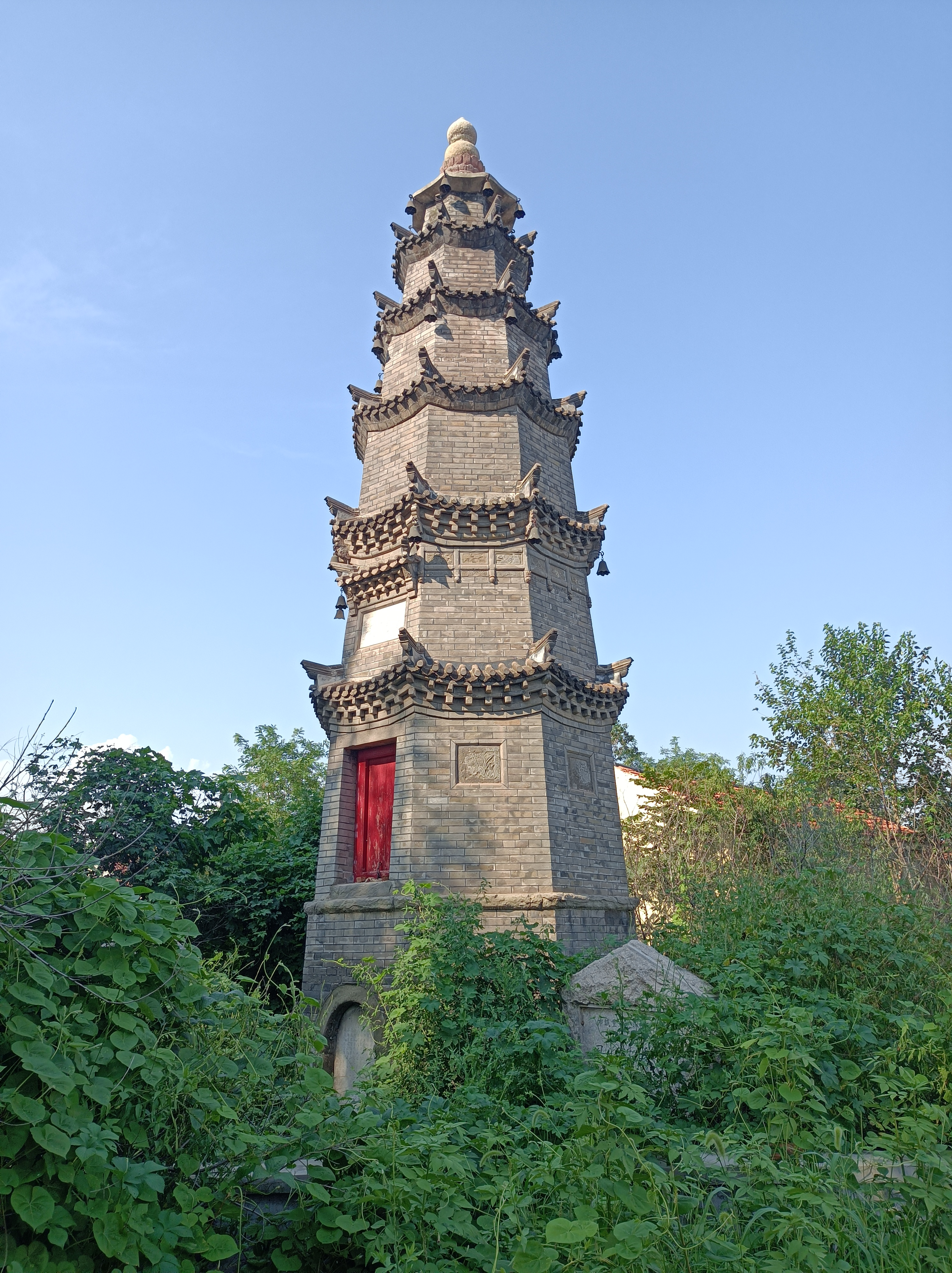
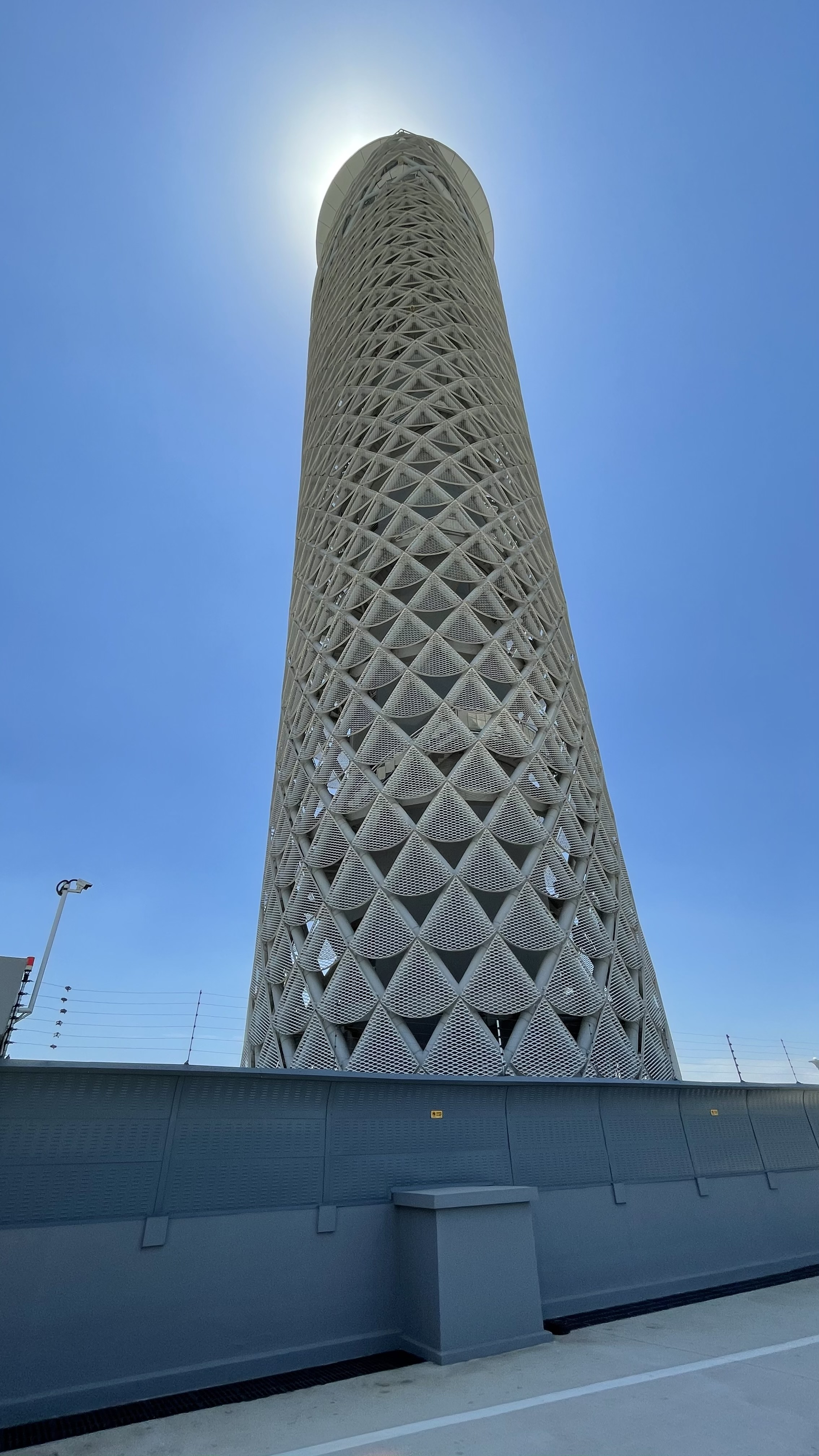
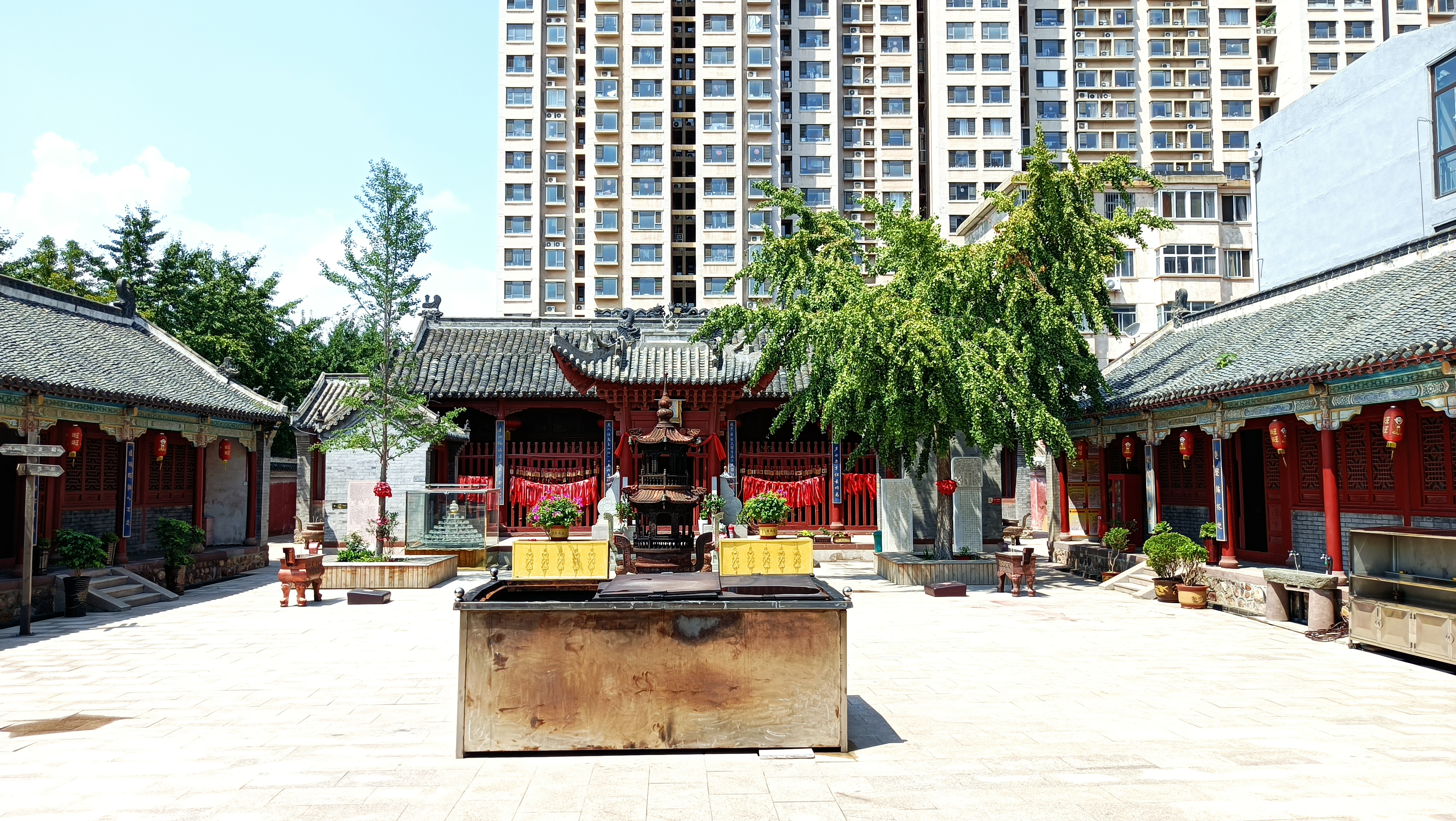
- Jiaozhou Station Madian Brick Pagoda TAO Shaohai Lake Chenghuang temple

- Location of Jiaozhou within Qingdao

- Location of the city center in Shandong
- Coordinates: 36°15′53″N 120°02′00″E
- Country: China
- Province: Shandong
- Sub-provincial municipality: Qingdao

Area
  - Total: 1,324 km^{2} (511 sq mi)

Population (2019)
  - Total: 907,500
- Time zone: UTC+08:00 (China Standard)
- Postal code: 266300

Jiaozhou (simplified Chinese: 胶州; traditional Chinese: 膠州; pinyin: Jiāozhōu), formerly Jiaoxian or Jiao County, is a county-level city of Qingdao sub-provincial municipality, Shandong Province, China. It gained its current county-level city designation in 1987. It has an area of 1,313 km^{2} (507 sq mi) and a population of 783,478 at the 2000 census.

== History ==
Jiaozhou, which belongs to Qingdao, Shandong, is located in the south-west of the Shandong Peninsula and the north-west coast of Jiaozhou Bay, with Chengyang District in the east, Gaomi and Jimo District in the west, Huangdao District in the south, and Pingdu in the north. The city is situated between 36 00 - 36 30 N, 119 37 - 120E, 51 kilometers across the East and west, 54.3 kilometers in the north and south, with a total area of 1324 square kilometers.

As of 2016, there were six subdistricts and six towns under jurisdiction of Jiaozhou city, with a total resident population of 89,3000.

Local GDP reached 103.59 billion yuan, of which the added value of the primary industry was 4.944 billion yuan, the added value of the secondary industry was 53.815 billion yuan and the added value of the tertiary industry was 44.781 billion yuan. The proportion of three industries is 4.8:52:43.2. Per capita GDP reached 117.63 thousand yuan.

Jiaozhou has a history of more than 5000 years, and still retains the Sanlihe cultural site in the Neolithic Age, which integrates Dawenkou culture and Longshan culture. Banqiao Town was established in the Tang Dynasty, Shengzhou was prosperous in the Northern Song Dynasty, and maritime trade continued to flourish. Special Shipping Department and Jiaoxi Chaoshang were the only foreign trade ports north of the Yangtze River and one of the five major commercial ports in the country. They were the important nodes of the "Maritime Silk Road".

In 2017, Jiaozhou was selected as the fifth national civilized city. In December 2017, it was selected into the list of the top 100 industrial counties (cities) in 2017 (ranked 18). In November 2018, it was named "China's Happy Hundred Counties List 2018". In October 2018, it was selected to establish the list of the pilot areas of rural primary, secondary and tertiary industry integration and development in 2018. In November 2018, it was selected as one of the top 100 industrial counties (cities) in China and the top 100 of the comprehensive well-off index of county-level cities in China. In December 2018, it was selected as the top 100 of the comprehensive competitiveness of county economy, the top 100 of the investment potential, the top 100 of the best commercial cities in mainland China in 2018 and the top 30 of the best county-level cities in China.

== Sports ==
The 12,000-capacity Jiaozhou Sports Centre Stadium is located in Jiaozhou. It is mainly used for association football and also sometimes for athletics and other events.

== Administrative divisions ==
As of 2012, this city is divided to 7 subdistricts and 10 towns.

Subdistricts

- Fu'an Subdistrict (阜安街道)
- Zhongyun Subdistrict (中云街道)
- Beiguan Subdistrict (北关街道)
- Sanlihe Subdistrict (三里河街道)
- Yunxi Subdistrict (云溪街道)
- Yinghai Subdistrict (营海街道)
- Jiaodong Subdistrict (胶东街道)

Towns

- Madian (马店镇)
- Ligezhuang (李哥庄镇)
- Puji (铺集镇)
- Zhangying (张应镇)
- Licha (里岔镇)
- Jiaoxi (胶西镇)
- Yanghe (洋河镇)
- Jiulong (九龙镇)
- Ducun (杜村镇)
- Jiaobei (胶北镇)

== Climate ==
Climate data for Jiaozhou, elevation 84 m (276 ft), (1991–2020 normals, extremes 1981–2010)
Month	Jan	Feb	Mar	Apr	May	Jun	Jul	Aug	Sep	Oct	Nov	Dec	Year
Record high °C (°F)	14.6 (58.3)	24.1 (75.4)	28.9 (84.0)	34.0 (93.2)	36.9 (98.4)	39.0 (102.2)	39.3 (102.7)	36.3 (97.3)	39.7 (103.5)	31.0 (87.8)	27.1 (80.8)	20.4 (68.7)	39.7 (103.5)
Mean daily maximum °C (°F)	3.7 (38.7)	6.8 (44.2)	12.5 (54.5)	18.9 (66.0)	24.4 (75.9)	27.7 (81.9)	30.2 (86.4)	30.0 (86.0)	26.8 (80.2)	20.9 (69.6)	13.1 (55.6)	5.9 (42.6)	18.4 (65.1)
Daily mean °C (°F)	−1.2 (29.8)	1.4 (34.5)	6.6 (43.9)	12.9 (55.2)	18.7 (65.7)	22.6 (72.7)	25.9 (78.6)	25.7 (78.3)	21.7 (71.1)	15.5 (59.9)	7.9 (46.2)	1.1 (34.0)	13.2 (55.8)
Mean daily minimum °C (°F)	−4.9 (23.2)	−2.7 (27.1)	2.1 (35.8)	8.2 (46.8)	14.0 (57.2)	18.7 (65.7)	22.7 (72.9)	22.4 (72.3)	17.5 (63.5)	11.0 (51.8)	3.8 (38.8)	−2.6 (27.3)	9.2 (48.5)
Record low °C (°F)	−18.3 (−0.9)	−14.6 (5.7)	−8.9 (16.0)	−4.3 (24.3)	2.1 (35.8)	8.5 (47.3)	16.0 (60.8)	13.7 (56.7)	6.4 (43.5)	−2.3 (27.9)	−9.6 (14.7)	−16.0 (3.2)	−18.3 (−0.9)
Average precipitation mm (inches)	9.2 (0.36)	15.1 (0.59)	16.6 (0.65)	32.4 (1.28)	52.4 (2.06)	68.0 (2.68)	147.0 (5.79)	176.1 (6.93)	65.2 (2.57)	31.2 (1.23)	31.1 (1.22)	12.1 (0.48)	656.4 (25.84)
Average precipitation days (≥ 0.1 mm)	2.8	3.6	4.1	6.0	6.9	7.7	11.4	10.8	6.7	4.8	5.0	3.7	73.5
Average snowy days	3.7	2.8	1.1	0.1	0	0	0	0	0	0	0.7	2.7	11.1
Average relative humidity (%)	63	62	59	60	65	74	81	81	73	67	67	64	68
Mean monthly sunshine hours	161.2	164.7	209.5	224.7	241.5	207.8	180.4	188.8	201.0	199.6	167.2	163.2	2,309.6
Percentage possible sunshine	52	53	56	57	55	48	41	46	55	58	55	54	53
Source: China Meteorological Administration

== See also ==
- Jiaozhou Bay
