= Yinghai Subdistrict, Jiaozhou =

Yinghai Subdistrict 营海街道
- Subdistrict
- Location in Qingdao City Yinghai (Shandong) Yinghai (China)
- Coordinates: 36°12′58″N 120°04′32″E
- Country: People's Republic of China
- Province: Shandong
- Sub-provincial city: Qingdao
- County-level city: Jiaozhou
- Village-level divisions: 47 residential communities
- Elevation: 8 m (26 ft)
- Time zone: UTC+8 (China Standard)
- Area code: 0532

Yinghai Subdistrict (simplified Chinese: 营海街道; traditional Chinese: 營海街道; pinyin: Yínghǎi Jiēdào) is a subdistrict of Jiaozhou City, Shandong, People's Republic of China, located south of G22 Qingdao–Lanzhou Expressway southeast of downtown. As of 2011, it has 47 villages under its administration.

== See also ==
- List of township-level divisions of Shandong
