= Qingdao Jiaozhou Bay Tunnel =

Road tunnel in Qingdao, Shandong, China

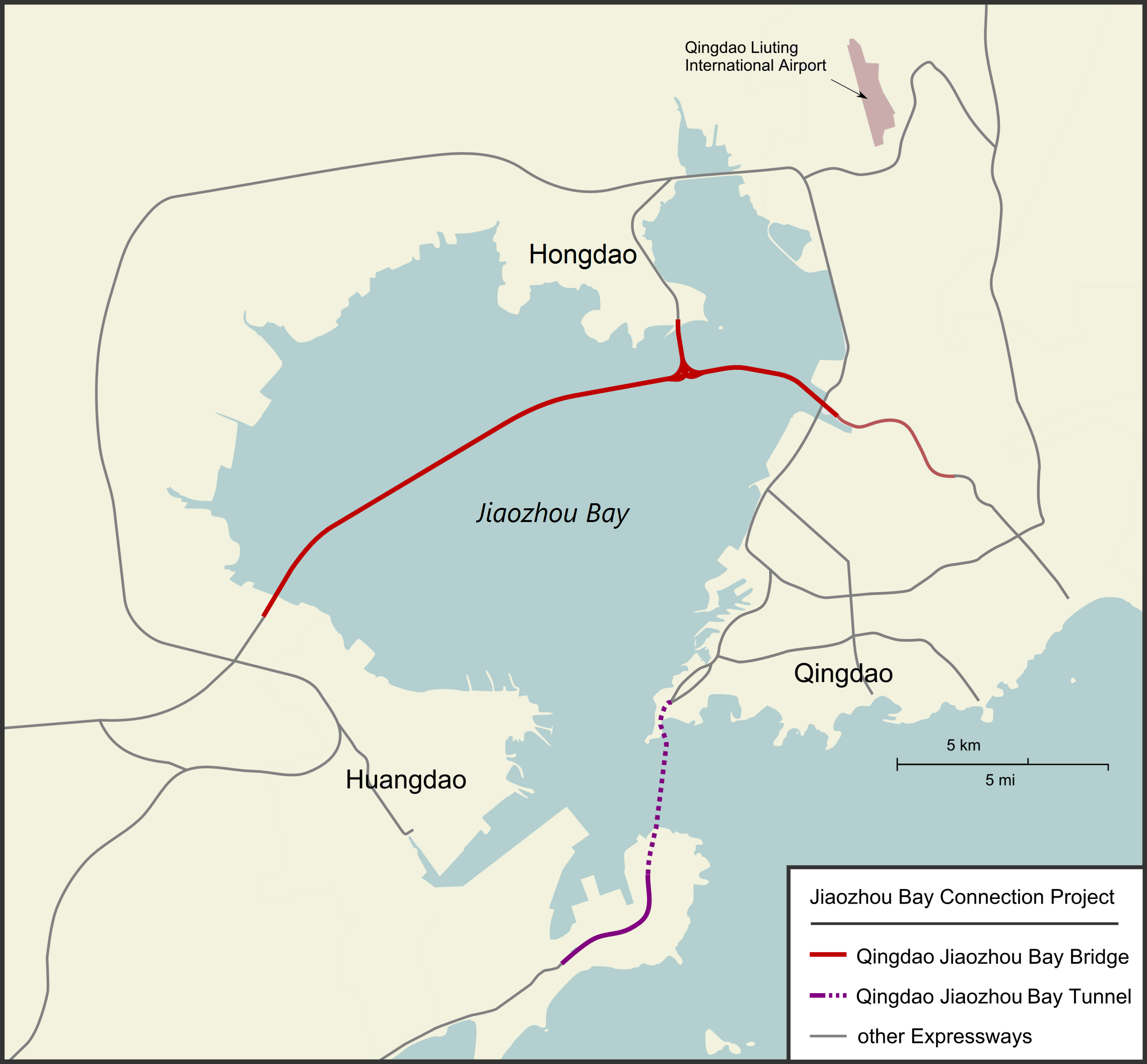
- Map of the Jiaozhou Bay Connection Project
- Interactive map of Qingdao Jiaozhou Bay Tunnel

Overview
- Location: Jiaozhou Bay, Qingdao, Shandong Province, China
- Coordinates: 36.029388°N 120.283270°E
- Start: Huangdao District, Qingdao
- End: Shinan District, Qingdao

Operation
- Work began: December 27, 2006
- Opened: July 1, 2011
- Traffic: automotive
- Toll: CN¥ 30 (passenger car)

Technical
- Length: 5.55 km (3.45 mi) underground
- No. of lanes: 6
- Operating speed: 80 km/h (50 mph)
- Min elevation: −70.5 m (−231 ft)

Qingdao Jiaozhou Bay Tunnel is an under-sea road tunnel located in Qingdao, Shandong Province in eastern China. It crosses underneath Jiaozhou Bay, connecting Huangdao District to the south with Shinan District in the north at the narrow entrance to the bay. It starts at Tuandao Road in the north and ends between Beizhuang village and Houchawan village on Xuejia Island in the south.

Construction began on December 27, 2006 and was completed five years later when it opened on July 1, 2011, two months after the scheduled opening date. It opened the same day as the nearby Qingdao Jiaozhou Bay Bridge, considered at the time the world's longest open-water bridge by Guinness World Records. The bridge and tunnel were planned together as the Jiaozhou Bay Connection Project.

The contiguous length of the tunnel road is about 7.8 km (4.8 mi), part of which is underground and part under the sea. The sub-sea portion is 3.95 km (2.45 mi). The deepest point of the crown of the tube to sea level is 74 meters. The deepest water depth is 42 meters. There are two tubes of three lanes each for a total of six lanes.

== See also ==
- Qingdao Jiaozhou Bay Bridge
