= Zhanjiang Bay Bridge =

Bridge in Zhanjiang, Guangdong, China

Zhanjiang Bay Bridge 湛江海湾大桥
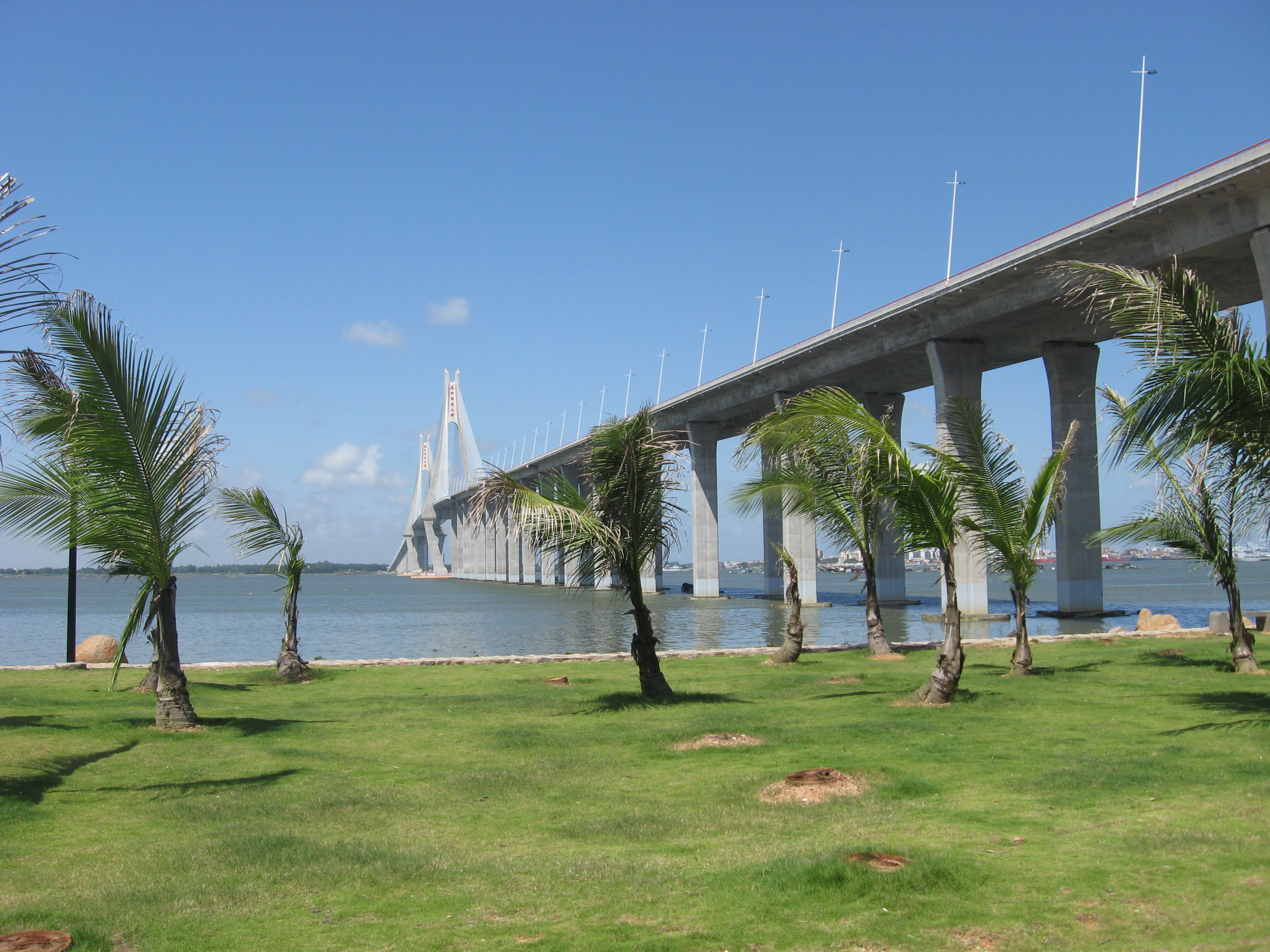
- Coordinates: 21.251806°N 110.418667°E
- Carries: Leshan Road
- Crosses: Zhanjiang Harbour
- Locale: Zhanjiang, Guangdong, China

Characteristics
- Design: Cable-stayed bridge
- Total length: 3,981 metres (13,061 ft)
- Height: 153.4 metres (503 ft)
- Longest span: 480 metres (1,575 ft)

History
- Opened: 2007

Location
- Interactive map of Zhanjiang Bay Bridge

The Zhanjiang Bay Bridge (湛江海湾大桥), is a cable-stayed bridge that crosses the harbour in Zhanjiang, Guangdong, China. The bridge's main span of 480 metres (1,575 ft) ranks it among the largest cable-stayed bridges in the world.

== See also ==
- List of largest cable-stayed bridges
- List of tallest bridges in the world
