= Dahej Bhavnagar railway sea link bridge =

Bridge in Gujarat, India

The Dahej Bhavnagar railway sea link bridge is a planned bridge in Gujarat, India.

== Background ==
In 2004, the original idea of building a railway bridge between Dahej and Ghogha in Gujarat was first proposed to Railway Ministry by mechanical engineer Vikram Zaveri. Details of the project were published in a Gujarati newspaper Janmabhoomi on 2 August 2004. In 2009, ferry service was approved by the Gujarat State Government on the same location and was inaugurated by PM Modi in 2017.

The 2004 proposal for the railway bridge was sent again to PM Modi in 2017, who forwarded it to S. C. Jain of Executive Director Works, Railway Bhavan. His response was posted on pgportal.gov.in on 23 April 2018.

On 26 February 2025, Ravi Varma (@RailDuniya on X) and on 13 March 2025 "Mantavya News", "DeshGujarat" and others announced that Railway Ministry has approved 1 Cr. (INR 10 million) for Final Location Survey (FLS) of 40 km Dahej Bhavnagar railway Sea Link project, and 23.1 Crs. (INR 231 million) for FLS of three related coastal line projects (924 Km). These two survey projects appear in Western Railway Document > Latest Status of Project & Survey 2025. FLS-Target date of completion. Sea Link Project: March 31, 2026. Coastal line Projects: December 31, 2026.

== Status of Final Location Survey (FLS)(Page 31) as on October 16, 2026 ==
50 FLS for Sea link between Dahej - Bhavnagar (40 Km)

As per Railway Board's instructions FLS has to be done on priority basis and has to be linked with the Kalpasar Project. Target date: March 31, 2027.

51 FLS for Coastal Lines of Dahej-Jambusar-Kathana- Khammbhat, Dholera- Bhavnagar, Bhavnagar- Mahuva-Pipavav & Pipavav- Chhara-Somnath- Saradia- Porbandar-Dwarka- Okha (924 Km)

Dropped as per RB Letter No 2024/W-1/WR/Survey/2(E:3471900) Dt. July 6, 2026.

== Kalpasar Project ==
The proposed Gulf of Khambhat, Kalpasar Project is an ambitious water resources initiative of the State Government of Gujarat. The project includes a proposed highway-cum-rail corridor over the dam across the Gulf of Khambhat. The corridor is expected to reduce the travel distance between Bhavnagar and Surat by approximately 179 km, from about 356 km through the existing land route to about 177 km via the proposed dyke corridor.

== Location and Length of the bridge ==
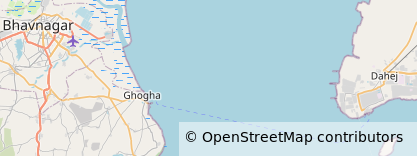
Location of proposed Dahej Bhavnagar railway sea link bridge

If the proposed sea link bridge is built along a straight line connecting Dahej and Bhavnagar port, then the length of the bridge over the waters of the Gulf of Khambhat will be about 30.8 Km, and if it is built along a straight line connecting Dahej and Ghogha, then the length of the bridge over the waters will be about 26.1 Km.

== Jamnagar Bharuch Expressway ==
Bids for preparing Detailed Project Report have been received by GeM-CPPP for this project in two packages.

Package 3: Jamnagar – Rajkot – Bhavnagar (248 km)

Package 4: Bhavnagar – Bharuch (68 km)

Ministry of Road Transport and Highways have received bids for preparing Detailed Project Report for a 6 lane sea bridge of about 30 km length over the Gulf of Khambhat between Bharuch and Bhavnagar from following firms.

Bloom Companies LLC (USA)

Institute Giprostroymost (Russia)

== Other Comparable Structures ==
• The New Pamban Bridge in Tamil Nadu, India, spanning 2.07 km, is currently the world's longest railway bridge over the sea. • Donghai Bridge in China is counted among the longest cross-sea bridges. Total length 32.5 km. • Mumbai Trans Harbour Link (Atal Setu) expressway bridge, the longest over the sea bridge in India. 18.2 km. • The Channel Tunnel (50.46 km), UK - France, has the longest continuous underwater portion of any railway tunnel, at 37.9 km. • The Seikan Tunnel in Japan is the longest railway tunnel (53.85 km.) with an under-sea section of 23.3 km. Connects the islands of Honshu and Hokkaido.

=== TBM Tunnel under Brahmaputra ===
On February 14, 2026, Govt. of India, Cabinet Committee on Economic Affairs (CCEA), cleared Rs 18,662 crore underwater road-rail tunnel under Brahmaputra river in Assam. Twin Tube TBM Tunnel with Railway in one of the tubes, length 15.79 km. Total project length 33.77 km. (PIB press release)
