= Qingdao Jiaozhou Bay Bridge =

Bridge in Qingdao, Shandong, China

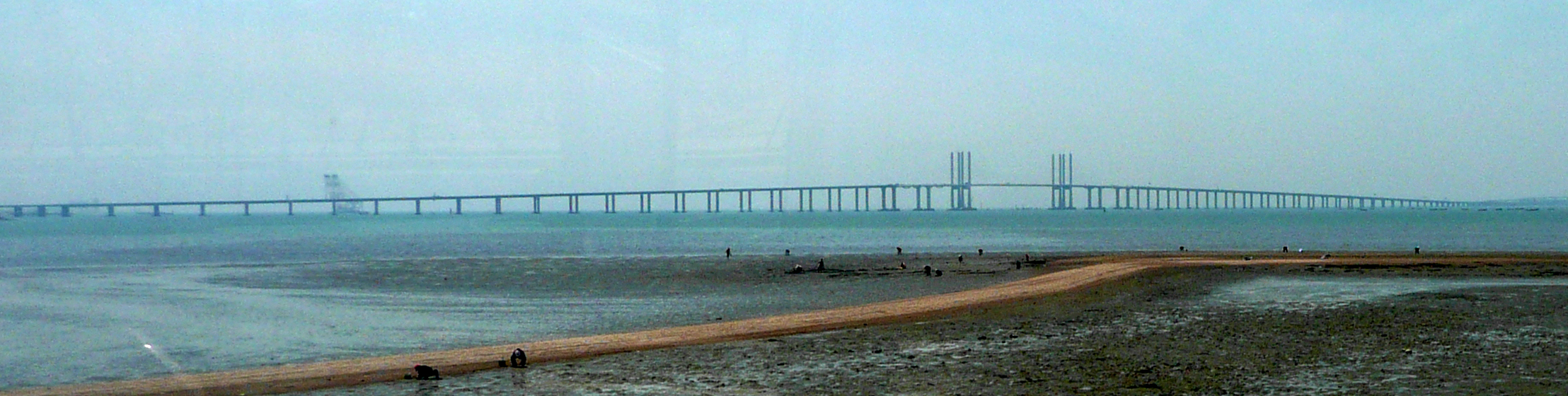
- Coordinates: 36.169913°N 120.298305°E
- Carries: Shandong Expressway S85/G22 Qingdao–Lanzhou Expressway
- Crosses: Jiaozhou Bay
- Locale: between Licang District and Huangdao District, Qingdao, Shandong, China

Characteristics
- Design: Self-anchored suspension bridge and Cable-stayed bridge
- Material: Prestressed concrete
- Total length: 26.707 kilometres (16.595 mi)
- Width: 35 m (115 ft)
- Longest span: Cangkou Channel Bridge: 260 m (850 ft)
- Clearance below: 190 m × 40.5 m (623 ft × 133 ft)

History
- Designer: Shandong Gaosu Group
- Construction start: late 2007
- Construction end: early 2011
- Construction cost: CN¥ 10 to 55 billion
- Opened: 30 June 2011

Location
- Interactive map of Qingdao Jiaozhou Bay Bridge

Qingdao Jiaozhou Bay Bridge
- Simplified Chinese: 青岛胶州湾大桥
- Traditional Chinese: 青島膠州灣大橋
- Literal meaning: Qingdao Jiaozhou Bay Bridge
Transcriptions
Standard Mandarin
- Hanyu Pinyin: Qīngdǎo Jiāozhōuwān Dàqiáo
- Wade–Giles: Ch'ingtao Ch'iaochaowan Tach'iao
Wu
- Romanization: koh^{平}tseu^{平}uae^{平} du^{去}jiau^{平}
Yue: Cantonese
- Yale Romanization: Jyau1jou1wan1 da4 chyau2
- Jyutping: gaau1 zau1 waan1 daai6 kiu4
Southern Min
- Hokkien POJ: kau-chiu-ôan tōa-kiô

Qingdao Jiaozhou Bay Bridge is a 26.7 km (16.6 mi) long roadway bridge in Qingdao, Shandong Province, China, which is part of the 41.58 km (25.84 mi) Jiaozhou Bay Connection Project. The longest continuous segment of the bridge is 25.9 km (16.1 mi), making it one of the longest bridges in the world.

== Description ==
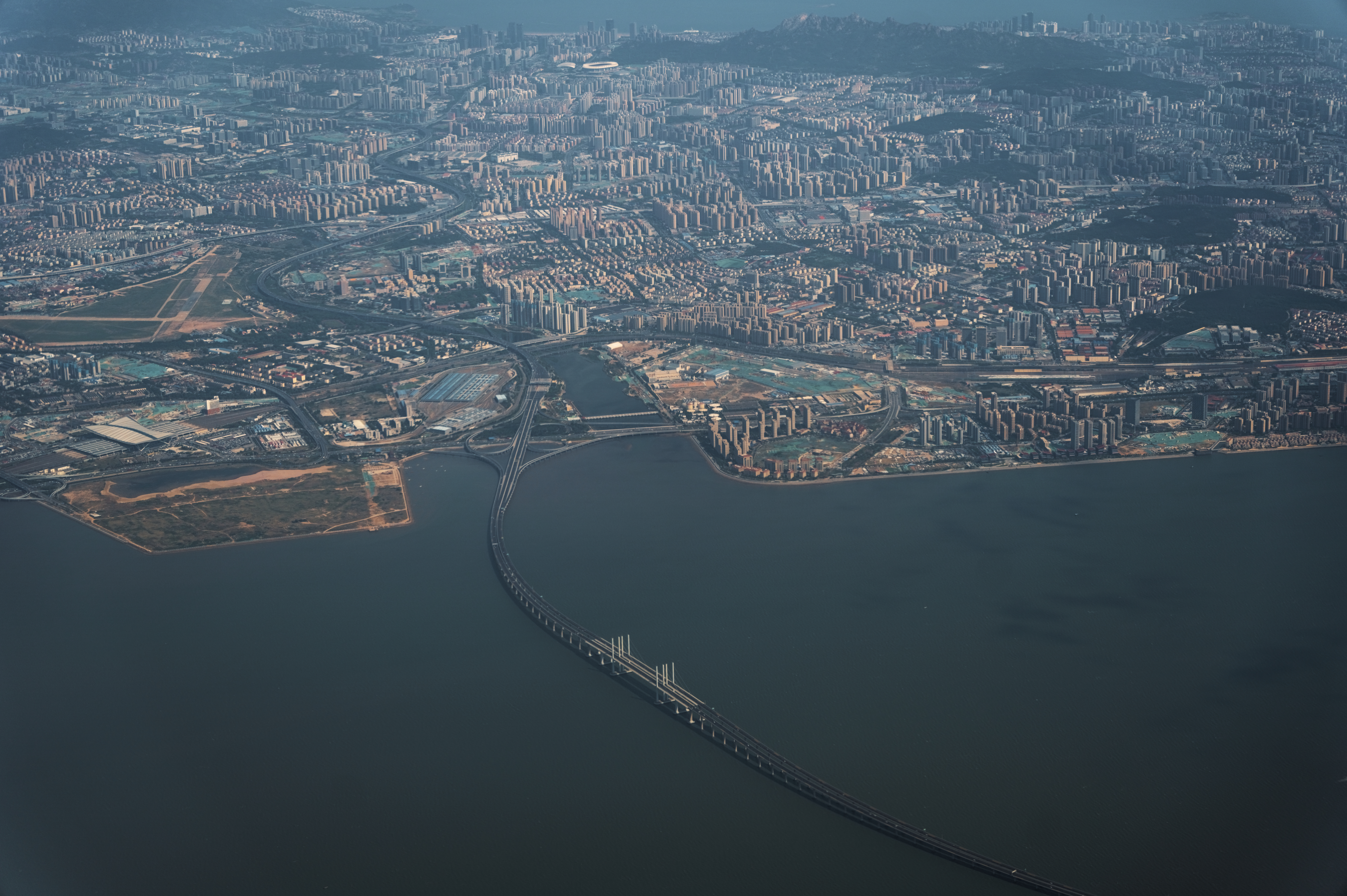
Aerial view of the bridge entrance from the Qingdao side

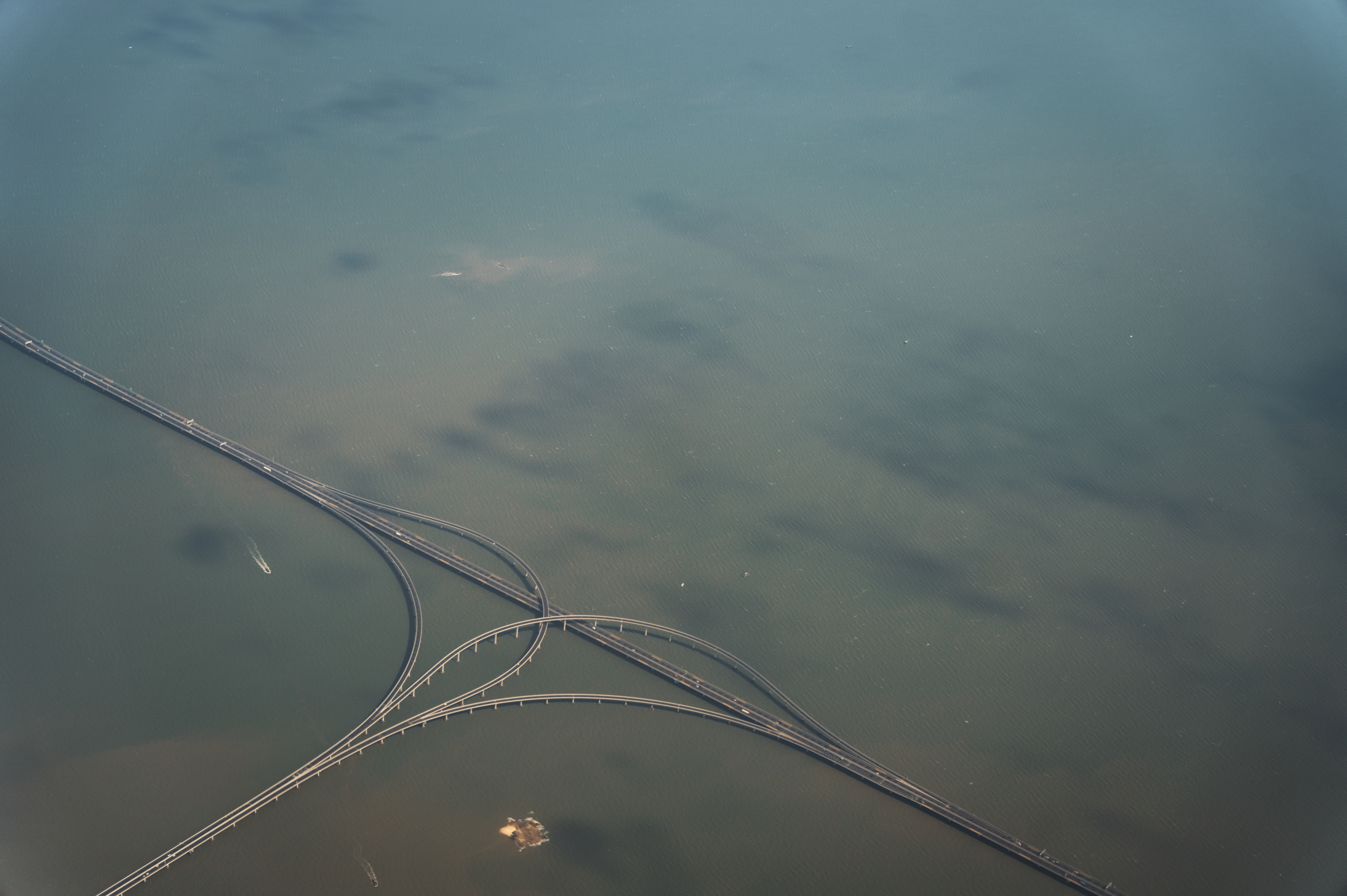
Aerial view of the T-interchange

The Jiaozhou Bay Bridge transects Jiaozhou Bay, which reduces the road distance between Licang District and Huangdao District in Qingdao by 30 km (19 mi), compared with the expressway along the coast of the bay, reducing travel time by 20 to 30 minutes. The design of the bridge is T-shaped with the main entry and exit points in Huangdao District and Licang District, Qingdao. A branch to Hongdao Subdistrict is connected by a semi-directional T interchange to the main span. The construction used 450,000 tons of steel and 2.3 million cubic metres (81×10^{6} cu ft) of concrete. The bridge is designed to be able to withstand severe earthquakes, typhoons, and collisions from ships. It is supported by 5,238 concrete piles. The cross section consists of two beams in total 35 m (115 ft) wide carrying six lanes with two shoulders.

The Jiaozhou Bay Bridge has three navigable sections: the Cangkou Channel Bridge to the west, the Dagu Channel Bridge to the east, and the Hongdao Channel Bridge to the north. The 600-metre (2,000 ft) long Cangkou Channel Bridge has the largest span of the entire Jiaozhou Bay Bridge, 260 m (850 ft). The Hongdao Channel Bridge has a span of 120 m (390 ft). The non-navigable sections of the bridge have a span of 60 m (200 ft).

=== Length ===
The length of the Jiaozhou Bay Bridge is 26.7 km (16.6 mi), of which 25.9 km (16.1 mi) are over water, representing the aggregate length of three legs of the bridge.

The Jiaozhou Bay Bridge is part of the Jiaozhou Bay Connection Project, which includes overland expressways and the Qingdao Jiaozhou Bay tunnel. The aggregated length of the project is 41.58 km (25.84 mi), which is by many sources listed as length of the Jiaozhou Bay Bridge.

The Jiaozhou Bay Connection Project consists of two non-connected sections: a 35.4 km (22.0 mi)-long expressway that includes the Jiaozhou Bay Bridge and a 6.17 km (3.83 mi)-long expressway that includes the Qingdao Jiaozhou Bay Tunnel.

The 35.4 km (22.0 mi) section is further broken into multiple parts:

- 26.7 km (16.6 mi) - Jiaozhou Bay Bridge of which 25.9 km (16.1 mi) is over water in the aggregate of three legs.
- 5.85 km (3.64 mi) - Licang District side land bridge
- 0.9 km (0.56 mi) - Huangdao District side land bridge
- 1.9 km (1.2 mi) - Hongdao Subdistrict connection

=== Records ===
After the bridge opened, Guinness World Records listed it at 41.58 km (25.84 mi), which made it the longest bridge over water (aggregate length). The Guinness title was taken by the Hong Kong-Zhuhai-Macau Bridge in October 2018.

The bridge builder Shandong Gaosu Group claimed that Jiaozhou Bay Bridge had the first oversea interchange in the world and that it has the world's largest number of oversea bored concrete piles.

== History ==
The bridge was the idea of a local official in the Chinese Communist Party who was subsequently dismissed for corruption. It was designed by the Shandong Gaosu Group. It took four years to build, and employed at least 10,000 people. It opened on 30 June 2011 for traffic.

The Qingdao Jiaozhou Bay tunnel opened on the same day as the bridge. It transects Jiaozhou Bay, also connecting Huangdao District and the city of Qingdao, between the narrow mouth of the bay, which is 6.17 km (3.83 mi) wide. The tunnel travels underground for 5.55 km (3.45 mi).

Concerns regarding the bridge's safety were raised when Chinese media reported that the bridge was opened with faulty elements, such as incomplete crash-barriers, missing lighting, and loose nuts on guard-rails, with workers stating that it would take two months before finishing all of the projects related to the bridge. Shao Xinpeng, the bridge's chief engineer, claimed that in spite of the safety report, the bridge was safe and ready for traffic, adding that the problems highlighted in the reports were not major.

The bridge was reported by the official state-run television company CCTV to cost CN¥10 billion (US$1.5 billion, GB£900 million). Other sources reported costs as high as CN¥55 billion (US$8.8 billion, GB£5.5 billion).

== See also ==
- Donghai Bridge
- Hangzhou Bay Bridge
- Lake Pontchartrain Causeway
- Lupu Bridge
- Qingdao Jiaozhou Bay Tunnel
