= Jiaozhou Bay =

Bay in Qingdao, China

Coordinates: 36°7′24.44″N 120°14′44.3″E

- Map of Jiaozhou Bay in 1865

Chinese name
- Simplified Chinese: 胶州湾
- Traditional Chinese: 膠州灣
- Postal: Kiaochow Bay; Kiautschou Bay (1898–1922)
Transcriptions
Standard Mandarin
- Hanyu Pinyin: Jiāozhōu Wān
- Wade–Giles: Ch'iao^{1}-chou^{1} Wan^{1}
Wu
- Romanization: Koh^{平} tseu^{平} uae^{平}
Yue: Cantonese
- Yale Romanization: Chiao1 chou1 wan1
- Jyutping: gaau^{1} zau^{1} waan^{1}
Southern Min
- Hokkien POJ: Kau-chiu-ôan

German name
- German: Kiautschou Bucht

Jiaozhou Bay (German: Kiautschou Bucht; simplified Chinese: 胶州湾; traditional Chinese: 膠州灣; pinyin: Jiāozhōu Wān) is a bay located in the prefecture-level city of Qingdao (Tsingtau), Shandong Province, China.

The bay has historically been romanized as Kiaochow, Kiauchau or Kiao-Chau in English and Kiautschou in German.

== Geography and ecology ==
Jiaozhou Bay is a natural inlet of the Yellow Sea, with a depth of 10 to 15 metres (33 to 49 ft) and deeper, dredged channels to three major ports around the bay: Qingdao, Huangdao, and Hongdao, all of which are ice-free during winter.

The bay is located on the southern coast of the Shandong Peninsula in East China, and separates Huangdao District from Qingdao City and borders on Jiaozhou City.

The bay is 32 kilometres (17 nmi; 20 mi) long and 27 kilometres (15 nmi; 17 mi) wide with a surface area of 362 square kilometres (106 sq nmi; 140 sq mi), approximately two-thirds the area of 100 years ago. According to official data, the surface area has decreased from 560 square kilometres (163 sq nmi; 216 sq mi) in 1928 to 362 square kilometres (106 sq nmi; 140 sq mi) by 2003 due to sustained land reclamation activities in recent decades.

The marine species have also decreased by two-thirds during the last 50 years due to urban and industrial development and growth of adjacent areas around the bay. Out of 170 species of organisms found in the northwestern part of the basin during the 1970s, only 17 were found in 1989. False killer whales still occasionally appear in the waters which were a regular range for the species until the 1980s. On the other hand, Jiaozhou Bay may serve as a suitable location for studying recoveries of coastal marine ecosystems.

== History ==
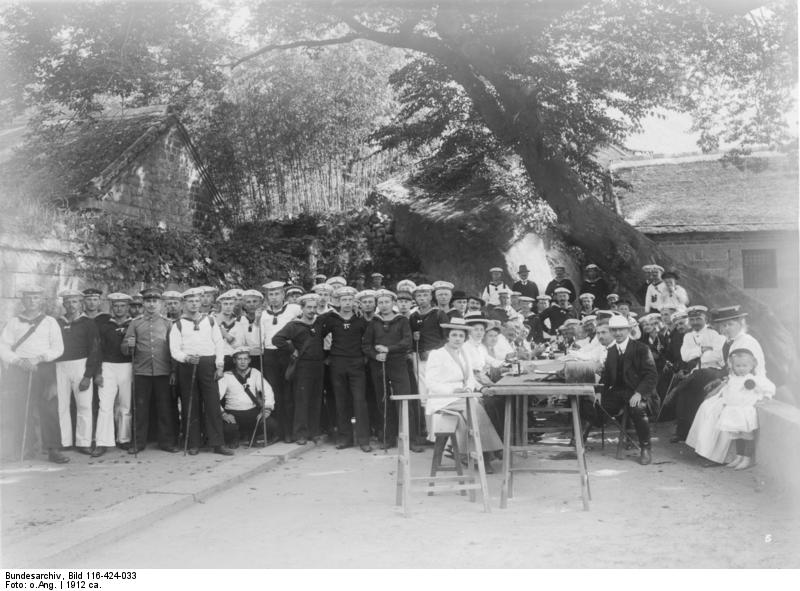
German sailors posing with German colonial government officials and their families in Tsingtau (1912)

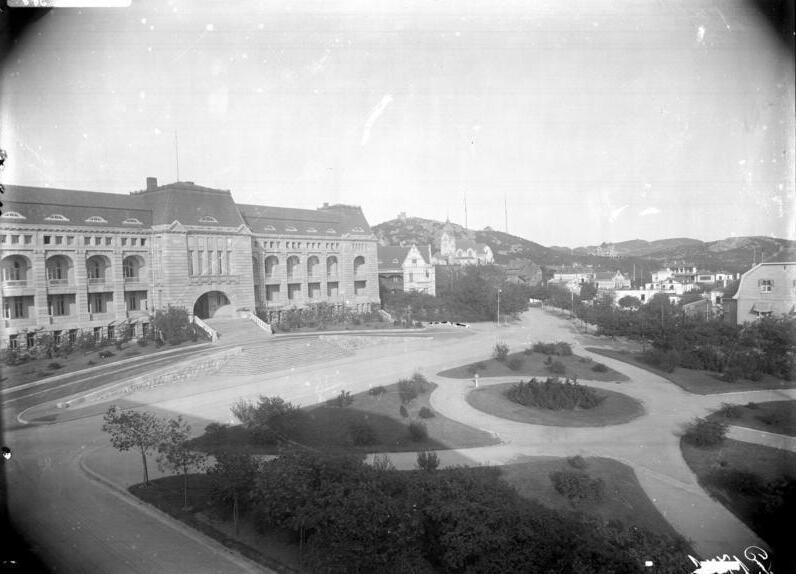
Tsingtau, Governor's House

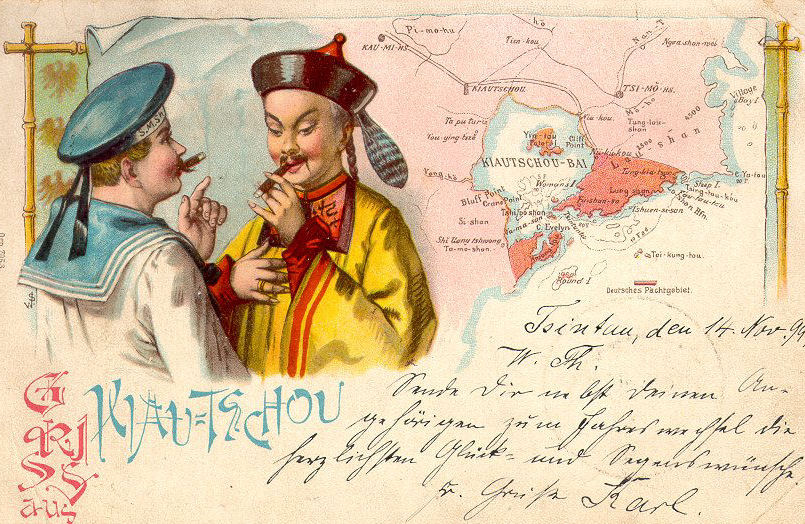
Postcard with Jiaozhou Bay depicted in background, ca. 1900

Jiaozhou Bay was known formerly as Jiao'ao (simplified Chinese: 胶澳; traditional Chinese: 膠澳; pinyin: Jiāo'ào). During the Qing dynasty, it developed a large junk trade when a customs station was established near its shores, in Qingdao.

The area became widely known to Europeans after the German Empire in March 1898 concluded a lease with the Qing government of China. Through this lease, the area was transferred to German rule on a 99-year lease (or until 1997, as the British did in Hong Kong's New Territories and as the French did in Kouang-Tchéou-Wan), and it became known as the Kiautschou Bay concession. The village of Tsingtau became the German colony of Tsingtau, and the area became a focus for German commercial development in China, while for the Imperial German Navy it was the base for their East Asia Squadron.

Because of land speculation in Germany's African colonies, a land value tax was introduced as the only tax in the colony. It was a great success, bringing wealth quite rapidly to the colony and also financial stability. The colony was the only government authority ever to exclusively rely on the single tax on land value, and is used as an academic case study to this day about the viability of such a tax system. The German colony also issued currency.

With the outbreak of World War I, the Republic of China cancelled the Kiautschou lease with the German Empire. This came into force on 23 August 1914, the day of Japan's declaration of war on Germany, after a Japanese ultimatum for unconditional German evacuation of the colony had expired. Following a two month military siege by British and Japanese forces, the colony was forced to surrender. It was then occupied by the British and Japanese.

The Republic of China declared war on Imperial Germany on 14 August 1917, since as a member of the victorious allies, China fully expected the former German colony would be returned to them. Instead, the Treaty of Versailles acceded to Japanese demands at the Paris Peace Conference and assigned all former German Pacific territories and islands north of the equator to Japan, including Jiaozhou Bay. This unexpected decision led to China-wide protests known as the "May Fourth Movement", which is now regarded as a significant event of modern Chinese history. As a result, the Beiyang government refused to sign the Treaty.

This situation was known as the "Shandong Problem". It eventually was resolved through mediation by the United States, which led to the former colony's return to Chinese sovereignty in February 1922.

== Connection project ==
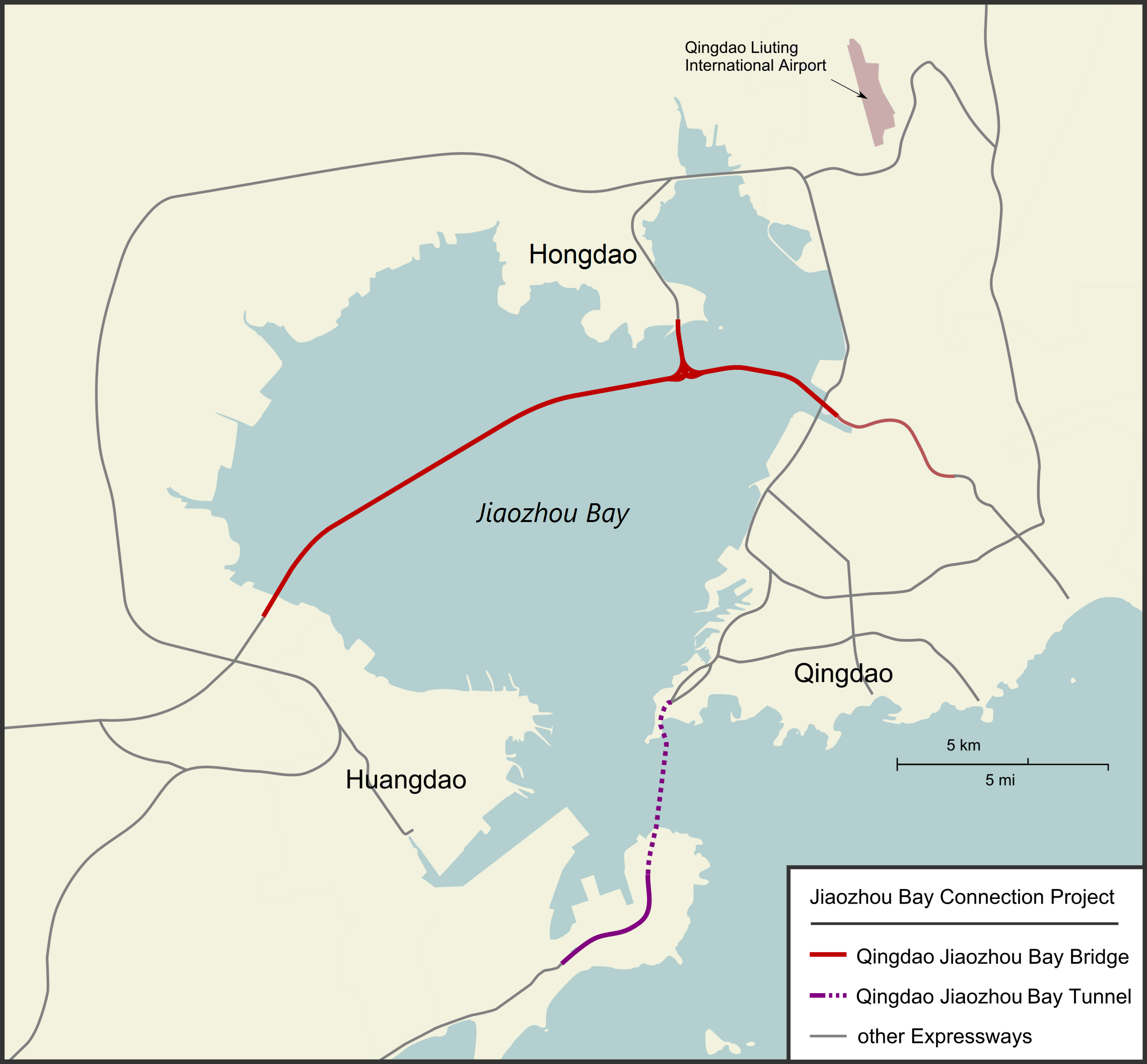
Jiaozhou Bay Connection Project

Jiaozhou Bay is situated wholly within the administrative boundaries of Qingdao. Counterclockwise, the bordering divisions are Shinan District, Shibei District, Sifang District, Licang District, Chengyang District, Jiaozhou City, Jiaonan City, and Huangdao District. The entrance to the bay is 6.17 km wide. In 1993, Qingdao City decided to build a traffic corridor for the Jiaozhou Bay region, which includes a tunnel under the inlet and a bridge across Jiaozhou Bay. The construction started in 2006. The bridge and the tunnel were both opened in 2011.

- At the time of its opening, the Qingdao Jiaozhou Bay Bridge was the world's longest bridge over water at 42.5 kilometers (26.4 mi). It shortened the travel time from Qingdao to the outlying region by more than half.
- The Qingdao Jiaozhou Bay Tunnel connects central Qingdao with Huangdao District with a length of over 7 kilometres (4.3 mi). Travel time is approximately 10 minutes by automobile from central Qingdao to Huangdao District.

== See also ==
- Jiaolai Plain
- Laizhou Bay
