= Huangdao, Qingdao =

District and state-level new area of Qingdao, Shandong, China

Huangdao District / West Coast New Area 黄岛区 / 西海岸新区
- District and state-level new area
- Huangdao District / West Coast New Area
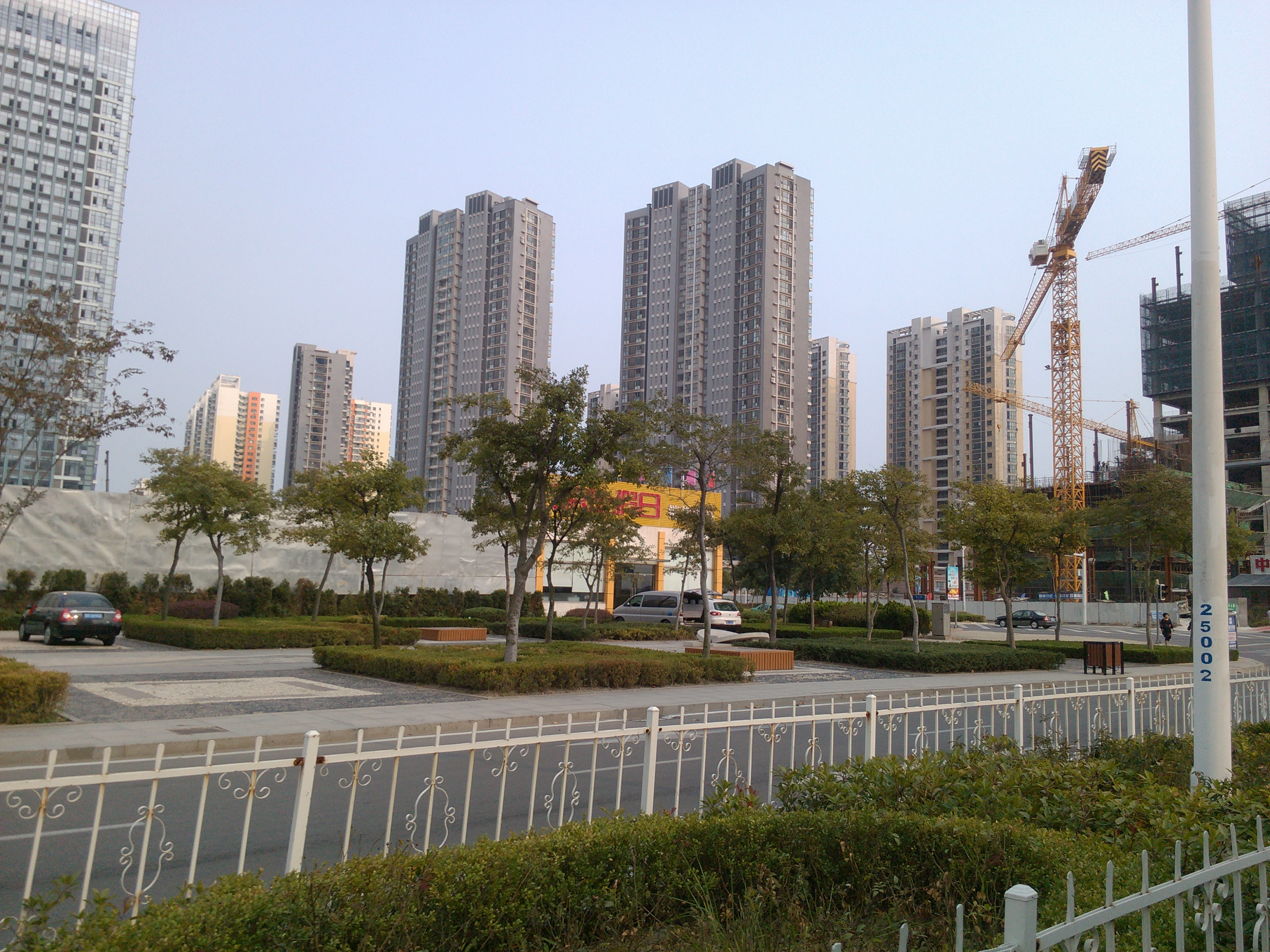

- Huangdao / West Coast New Area in Qingdao

- Location of the district seat in Qingdao Huangdao District / West Coast New Area (Shandong) Huangdao District / West Coast New Area (China)
- Coordinates: 35°52′22″N 120°02′46″E
- Country: China
- Province: Shandong
- Sub-provincial city: Qingdao
- Township-level divisions: 12 subdistricts 10 towns
- District seat: Yinzhu Subdistrict (隐珠街道)

Area
  - Total: 2,220.10 km^{2} (857.19 sq mi)
- Elevation: 25 m (82 ft)

Population (2019)
  - Total: 1,608,200
  - Density: 724.38/km^{2} (1,876.1/sq mi)
- Time zone: UTC+08:00 (China Standard)
- Postal code: 266400, 266500
- Area code: 0532
- Website: HuangDao.gov.cn

Huangdao District
- Traditional Chinese: 黃島區
- Simplified Chinese: 黄岛区
- Literal meaning: Yellow Island District
Transcriptions
Standard Mandarin
- Hanyu Pinyin: Huángdǎo Qū

West Coast New Area
- Traditional Chinese: 西海岸新區
- Simplified Chinese: 西海岸新区
Transcriptions
Standard Mandarin
- Hanyu Pinyin: Xīhǎi'àn Xīn Qū

Huangdao District (Chinese: 黄岛区; lit. 'Yellow Island District') and West Coast New Area (Chinese: 西海岸新区), is a district and a state-level new area of Qingdao, Shandong, China, located south-west and west of the main urban area of the city on the western shore of Jiaozhou Bay. It was identical to Qingdao Economic and Technological Development Zone (QETDZ, simplified Chinese: 青岛经济技术开发区; traditional Chinese: 青島經濟技術開發區; pinyin: Qīngdǎo Jīngjì Jìshù Kāifā Qū), which was launched in 1985 after the zone was merged with Huangdao District and set up the Free Trade Zone in 1992. In December 2012, Jiaonan, a county-level city in Qingdao was merged into Huangdao District.

The pillar industries engaged in the zone include electronics, household electric appliances, building materials, petrochemicals, machinery and pharmaceutical drugs. It is connected via Qingdao Jiaozhou Bay Bridge.

In mid 2018, the Ministry of Civil Affairs approved the consolidation of Huangdao District Government and West Coast New Area Government into a single governing body, which became the fourth administrative state-level new areas after Pudong of Shanghai; Binhai of Tianjin; and Nansha of Guangzhou. The population was 1.71 million in 2014.

== Administrative divisions ==
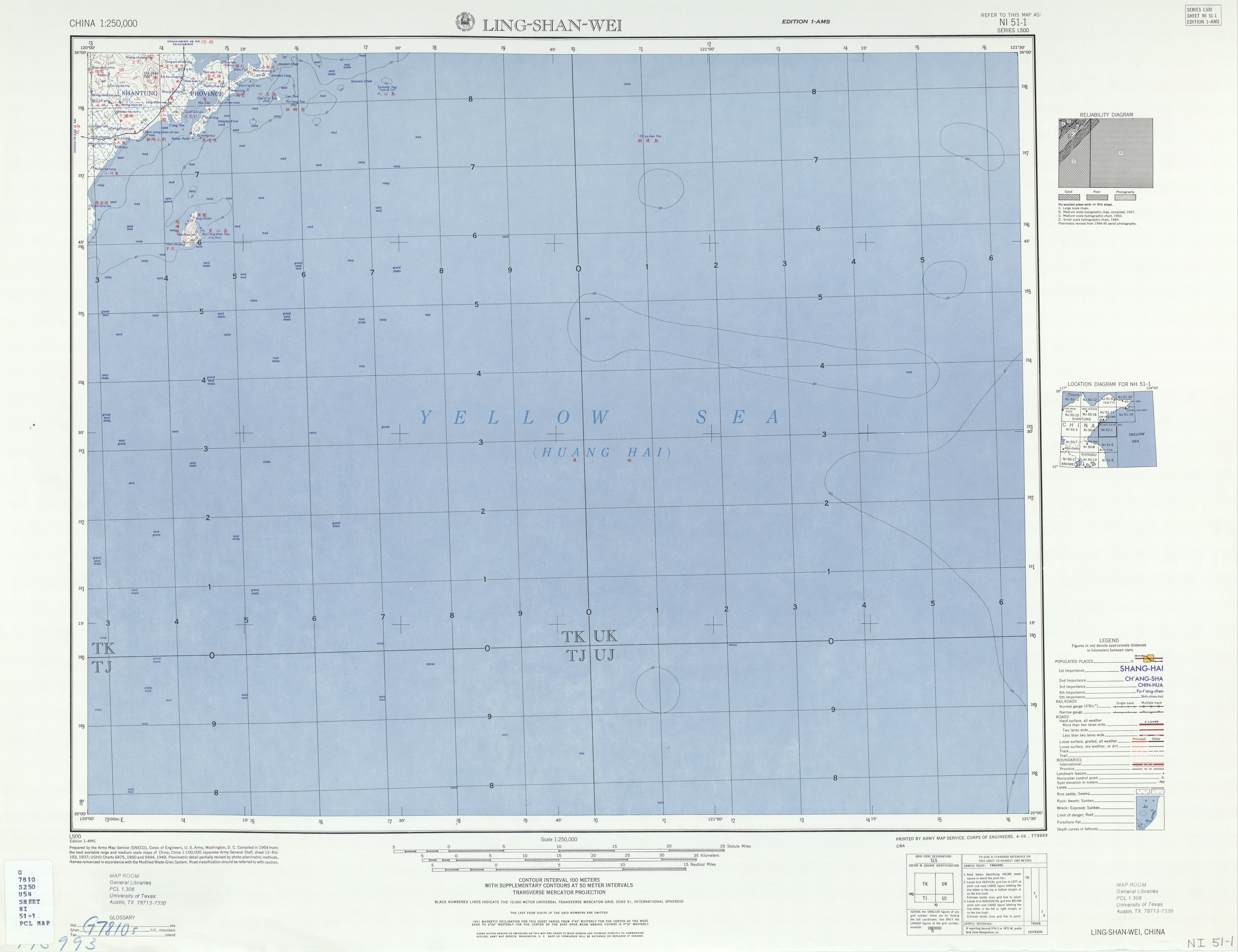
Map including Huangdao (AMS, 1954)

Huangdao District is the earliest key area of Qingdao's opening-up to the outside world. In 1985, the Qingdao Economic and Technological Development Zone was built in Huangdao District. In 1992, with the approval of the Shandong Provincial Party Committee and Government, the total area of Qingdao Economic and Technological Development Zone and Huangdao District was expanded to 217.33 square kilometers after the integration of the two district systems. In 2004, the original renovation system of Hongshiya Town in Jiaonan City was transferred to Huangdao District, and the area was further expanded to 274.1 square kilometers. Huangdao is divided into 12 subdistricts and 10 more rural towns; the latter half of the current subdistricts and all towns were ceded from Jiaonan City.

Subdistricts

- Huangdao Subdistrict (黄岛街道)
- Xin'an Subdistrict (辛安街道)
- Xuejiadao Subdistrict (薛家岛街道)
- Lingzhushan Subdistrict (灵珠山街道)
- Changjiang Road Subdistrict (长江路街道)
- Hongshiya Subdistrict (红石崖街道)
- Jiaonan Subdistrict (胶南街道)
- Zhuhai Subdistrict (珠海街道)
- Yinzhu Subdistrict (隐珠街道)
- Lingshanwei Subdistrict (灵山卫街道)
- Tieshan Subdistrict (铁山街道)
- Binhai Subdistrict (滨海街道)

Towns

- Langya (琅琊镇)
- Poli (泊里镇)
- Dachang (大场镇)
- Dacun (大村镇)
- Liuwang (六汪镇)
- Wangtai (王台镇)
- Zhangjialou (张家楼镇)
- Haiqing (海青镇)
- Baoshan (宝山镇)
- Zangma (藏马镇)

== Transport ==
The Jiaozhou Bay Ring Expressway from Huangdao to Qingdao urban area has a total length of 66 kilometers. The Jiaozhou Bay Bridge in Qingdao has a total length of 36.48 kilometers connecting Huangdao, Qingdao, and Hongdao. The Qingdao Jiaozhou Bay Underwater Tunnel has a length of 3950 meters in the underwater section connecting the two cities.

=== Maritime transportation ===
- Qianwan Port: The seventh largest port in the world, with 75 berths/15.52 million TEUs (2013).

=== China Railway ===
- Qingdao West railway station

=== Qingdao Metro ===
- Line 1
- Line 6
- Line 13

== Climate ==
Climate data for Huangdao (Zhuhai Subdistrict), elevation 10 m (33 ft), (1991–2020 normals, extremes 1981–2010)
Month	Jan	Feb	Mar	Apr	May	Jun	Jul	Aug	Sep	Oct	Nov	Dec	Year
Record high °C (°F)	15.2 (59.4)	19.7 (67.5)	24.8 (76.6)	35.9 (96.6)	35.0 (95.0)	36.6 (97.9)	41.0 (105.8)	35.8 (96.4)	38.0 (100.4)	30.5 (86.9)	25.6 (78.1)	18.6 (65.5)	41.0 (105.8)
Mean daily maximum °C (°F)	4.3 (39.7)	6.7 (44.1)	11.6 (52.9)	17.5 (63.5)	23.0 (73.4)	25.9 (78.6)	29.0 (84.2)	29.5 (85.1)	26.4 (79.5)	21.0 (69.8)	13.6 (56.5)	6.7 (44.1)	17.9 (64.3)
Daily mean °C (°F)	−0.5 (31.1)	1.8 (35.2)	6.6 (43.9)	12.5 (54.5)	18.1 (64.6)	21.8 (71.2)	25.6 (78.1)	26.0 (78.8)	22.1 (71.8)	16.0 (60.8)	8.6 (47.5)	1.9 (35.4)	13.4 (56.1)
Mean daily minimum °C (°F)	−4.1 (24.6)	−2.0 (28.4)	2.4 (36.3)	8.2 (46.8)	13.9 (57.0)	18.7 (65.7)	23.0 (73.4)	23.2 (73.8)	18.3 (64.9)	11.6 (52.9)	4.4 (39.9)	−1.8 (28.8)	9.7 (49.4)
Record low °C (°F)	−16.2 (2.8)	−15.1 (4.8)	−8.1 (17.4)	−2.8 (27.0)	3.4 (38.1)	9.7 (49.5)	16.5 (61.7)	14.8 (58.6)	6.6 (43.9)	−1.4 (29.5)	−7.7 (18.1)	−12.6 (9.3)	−16.2 (2.8)
Average precipitation mm (inches)	10.9 (0.43)	17.7 (0.70)	20.4 (0.80)	34.8 (1.37)	72.8 (2.87)	76.9 (3.03)	156.3 (6.15)	192.4 (7.57)	90.3 (3.56)	37.4 (1.47)	37.2 (1.46)	14.9 (0.59)	762 (30)
Average precipitation days (≥ 0.1 mm)	3.0	4.0	4.7	6.4	7.9	8.4	11.7	11.5	7.2	5.3	5.4	3.6	79.1
Average snowy days	3.6	3.0	1.3	0.1	0	0	0	0	0	0	0.7	2.4	11.1
Average relative humidity (%)	63	64	63	64	69	79	84	82	73	67	67	63	70
Mean monthly sunshine hours	166.7	165.8	212.1	224.8	239.5	199.2	178.4	193.4	202.2	199.8	170.1	166.9	2,318.9
Percentage possible sunshine	54	54	57	57	55	46	41	47	55	58	56	55	53
Source: China Meteorological Administration
