= Deutsche Post (disambiguation) =

Deutsche Post is a German postal service and international courier service brand of Deutsche Post AG (DHL Group).

Deutsche Post may also refer to:

- Deutsche Post of the GDR, state-owned postal and telecommunications monopoly of the German Democratic Republic, 1949–1990
- Die Deutsche Post, first German-language newspaper in Australia, a predecessor of Australische Zeitung

== See also ==
- Reichspost, the official German postal authority prior to 1946
- Deutsche Bundespost, the official post authority in the Federal Republic of Germany from 1949 to 1995
- Postage stamps and postal history of Germany as established by the Allies in the American, British, and Russian occupation zones in Germany 1946–1949
