= Anton Schlünder =

Prussian landowner (1825–1889)

Postmaster of Wickede
- Preceded by: Nicolaus Schlünder

Personal details
- Born: 31 August 1825 Old Post House, Wimbern, Wickede, Prussia
- Died: 23 June 1889 (aged 63) Old Post House, Wimbern, Wickede, Prussia
- Spouse(s): Pauline Stromberg (m. 1855)

Anton Christian Ferdinand Schlünder (31 August 1825 – 23 June 1889) was a Prussian landowner, and the postmaster and manager of the Old Post House, Wimbern, better known as Altepost, which is still a cultural heritage site today. He was the third generation Schlünder to hold the title after his grandfather and father, respectively. He was also the last, as the position was abolished during his lifetime.

== Biography ==
Schlünder was born in 1825 in Wimbern, Wickede, to Nicolaus Schlünder and Maria Margarethe Becker, as the fourth of seven children. He was known as Christian to his family members. His father, Nicolaus combined his father's postal business with his agricultural business and farm holdings, creating a family company. Christian's older brother Franz died in 1836 aged only 19, leaving him as the eldest surviving son. Nicolaus himself died only three years later, in 1839. His mother, pregnant with her final child, then took over the company until Christian became of age.

Schlünder began his career as Post Master in 1843, managing the Old Post House, better known as Altepost. It was designed by his grandfather. Post offices were a great source of income at the time, especially at a time where most travel happened by carriages, which needed to change horses often. In 1826, the Old Post House was even visited by King Frederick William III. Schlünder also operated the 'Am Schlünder' waiting room, another source of income, where the travellers could warm up, freshen up, and order coffee.

However, in 1871, after the unification of the German Empire, the Reichspost ("Imperial Mail") was introduced, and making a profit through independent postal services became illegal. Altepost continued to rent out carriages and horses, but this business too was made obsolute by the industrialisation of the later 19th century, which introduced more available cars and a national railways system for Germany. Schlünder pivoted again and made Altepost the headquarters for his new dairy company, for which he bought several farms. He also became a member of the Wimbern School Board, which found a school for underprivileged children.

Schlünder died in 1889, and left his dairy business and lands to his eldest son Christoph, who died only ten years later. Christoph's grandson, also named Christoph, was also a famed businessman.

== Marriage and issue ==
Anton married Pauline Clara Henriette Stromberg (6 March 1830 – 12 May 1895) on 29 November 1855 in Menden. Together, they had twelve children, three of whom died in infancy, and forty-one grandchildren:

1. Christoph Theodor Christian Schlünder (10 December 1856 – 24 December 1899), his father's successor. He married Maria Schulte-Gunne, and had four children.
2. Elisabeth Frederica Margarethe Schlünder (26 September 1858 – 29 May 1918), who married Franz Anton Crux and had four children.
3. Gustav Friedrich Wilhelm Schlünder (29 September 1859 – 5 July 1914), who managed his father's business in Münster. He married Margarethe Schilling and they had eight children.
4. Margarethe Louise Ferdinandine Schlünder (20 October 1861 – 10 May 1915), who married Bernhard Groove and had eight children.
5. Pauline Elisabeth Frederica "Paula" Schlünder (17 August 1863 – 11 June 1931), never married.
6. Marie Antoinette Victoria Schlünder (2 October 1864 – 24 January 1940), who moved to the Netherlands after her marriage to Heribert Korte. They had six children.
7. Franziska Christian Schlünder (24 April 1866 – 18 March 1900), who married Wenzel Brinkmann and had four children.
8. Ferdinand Schlünder (15 July 1867 – 8 September 1867)
9. Theodor Schlünder (12 April 1868 – 28 January 1869)
10. Mathilde Schlünder (29 March 1870 – 1 August 1946), who later became a nun under the name Maria Ignatia.
11. Josef Schlünder (17 April 1871 – 26 September 1871)
12. Christiane Gertrud Hermine Schlünder (10 January 1873 – 2 January 1966), who married Johannes Berentzen, heir to the Berentzen fortune, and had seven children.
