= Postlagerkarte =

Postlagerkarte (literally mail storage card; abbreviated PLK) was a German postal service that enabled customers to receive mail anonymously, without providing any identification documents. It was introduced by the German Imperial Post in 1910 and abolished in 1991.

== See also ==
- P.O. box
