= Foreign Office Collection =

The Foreign Office Collection is a collection of proofs, colour trials, and issued stamps from the Allied Military Administration issues of 1945–48 for occupied Germany. The collection is part of the British Library Philatelic Collections and was transferred from the Foreign Office in 1956.

== See also ==
- Model Collection
- Postage stamps and postal history of Germany
