= Model Collection =

Stamp collection

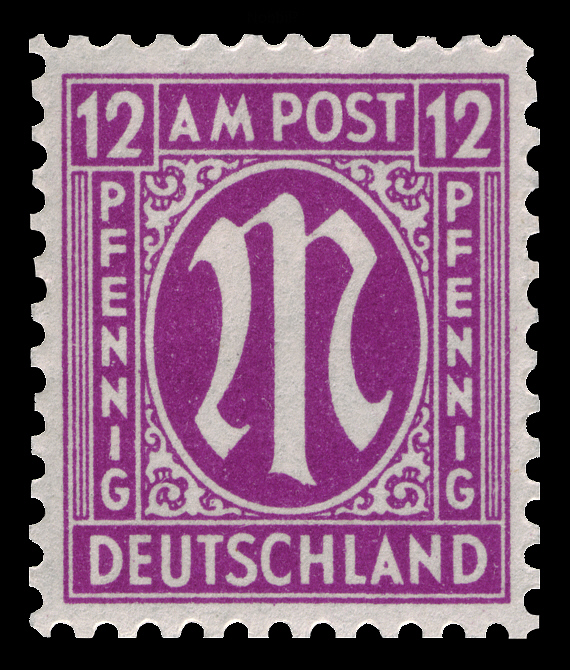
A 1945 stamp of Germany (not from the Model Collection).

The Model Collection is a collection of 1945–1946 local provisional stamps of Germany issued following the allied occupation, unused and on covers that forms part of the British Library Philatelic Collections. It was formed by Dr Walther Model von Thunen and donated to the British Museum in 1956.

== See also ==
- Foreign Office Collection
- Postage stamps and postal history of Germany
