= Deutsche Post of the GDR =

East German postal service

- Deutsche Post der DDR
- Flag used from 1975 until 1990

Agency overview
- Formed: 1949
- Dissolved: 1990
- Headquarters: East Berlin
- Parent Agency: Ministry of Post and Telecommunications

The Deutsche Post (German pronunciation: [ˈdɔʏtʃə ˈpɔst], lit. 'German Post', abbr. DP [deːˈpeː]), also Deutsche Post of the GDR (German: Deutsche Post der DDR, pronounced [ˈdɔʏtʃə ˈpɔst deːɐ ˌdeːdeːˈʔɛʁ]) was the state-owned postal and telecommunications monopoly of the German Democratic Republic (GDR - East Germany). The DP was placed under the control of the Ministry of Post and Telecommunications, a member of the Council of Ministers of the GDR, and was in operation from 1949 until the reunification of Germany on 3 October 1990.

== Historical background ==
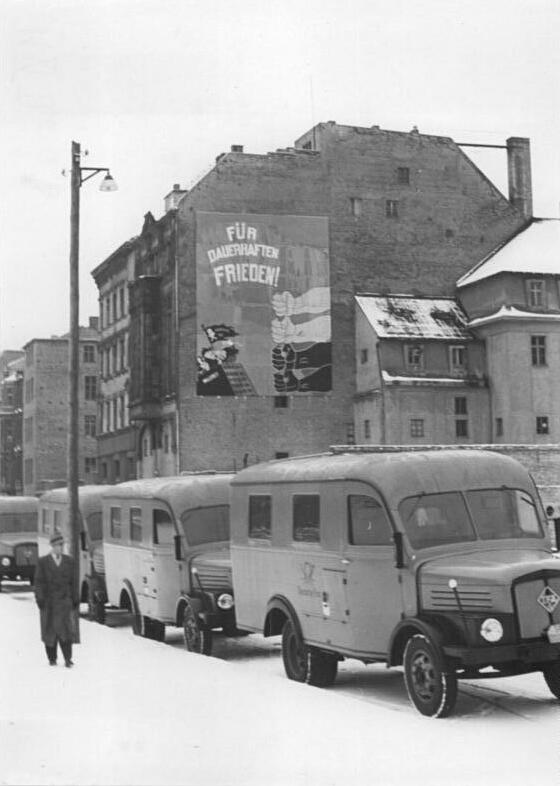
New post office vans in 1952

With the end of the Second World War in Europe in May 1945, the Allied Control Council succeeded the former Nazi regime in Germany; as part of this action, the Deutsche Reichspost (the postal service of the German Reich) was absorbed by the occupation authorities. Germany was divided into four occupation zones, and Berlin into four sectors; the territories east of the Oder-Neisse rivers were placed under Polish and Soviet authority. One of the first tasks of restoring civil government in Germany involved the restoration of postal and telecommunications services.

The German Central Administration for Communication Services (Deutsche Zentralverwaltung für das Nachrichtenwesen) began its work in the Soviet occupation zone under the jurisdiction of the Soviet Military Administration in Germany on 27 July 1945. The post office in the Soviet zone fell under its authority. Initially, the individual states (Länder) in the Soviet zone issued their own stamps, but by 1946, stamps bearing the inscription Deutsche Post, valid in all four occupation zones, were being issued.

When negotiations related to general German currency reforms broke down, the Western Allies proceeded with the currency reform in West Germany, and on 21 June 1948 the Deutsche Mark was introduced. In response, the Soviet Union announced its reform of the East German currency on 24 June 1948; the East German Mark became the currency for the Soviet zone, and its stamps were marked with overprints. This established the economic separation of the two German states. In July 1948, the stamps of the previously common issue were overprinted with the words "Soviet Occupation Zone" and subsequently the Soviet zone issued different stamps from the western zones, all, however, under the "Deutsche Post" label.

The Federal Republic of Germany (FRG) was founded on 23 May 1949; the formal proclamation of the German Democratic Republic followed on 7 October 1949. In the FRG the "Deutsche Post" was renamed Deutsche Bundespost (German Federal Post) in 1950, while the GDR retained the term "Deutsche Post". Due to Berlin's occupation status, the West Berlin postal service was technically independent of the West German Bundespost; it was known as the Deutsche Bundespost Berlin. However, no such requirements were applied to the DP operating in East Berlin.

Official flag of the DP of the GDR (1955-73)

== Functions ==
=== Overview ===
Similar to many other European postal administrations until the 1990s, the DP provided the following services throughout the GDR:

1. Postal services (including philately)
2. Telephone services
3. Telegrams
4. Postal banking services (including giro and savings accounts)

As in other European countries, although banking services were also available through other institutions, the DP enjoyed a monopoly on the provision of postal and telecommunications services inside the GDR (including East Berlin).

The DP maintained 2279 post offices throughout the GDR, as well as 9586 other offices and locations. In 1985, the DP transported 1.273 billion pieces of mail, 15 million packages, and 40 million packets, while the telephone system handled 767 million long-distance and 1.317 billion local telephone calls.

=== Stamp issuances ===
The first stamp was issued on 9 October 1949, commemorating the 75th anniversary of the Universal Postal Union (UPU) (Mi #242). Regular air mail service started in 1950, beginning with the Soviet Union, then with other countries. With the creation of two German states, mail between the two was handled according to the regulations of the UPU.

According to the Scott catalog, during the next 41 years the DP issued more stamps than any other postal authority in Germany - 2,802 different stamps including many commemoratives, plus 191 semi-postal designs, and 16 air mail stamps. Topics of commemoratives include common topicals (e.g. nature, sports, arts), science and technical issues, and communist-related themes. Additional stamps of the DP consisted of official stamps (44 types). Following the economic and currency union of the two German states on 1 July 1990, stamps were denominated in Deutsche Mark. The last DP stamp issue, on 2 October 1990, was a Heinrich Schliemann commemorative (Mi #3364/5).

=== Stamps for hard currency ===
Stamps were to some degree produced for sale to gain hard currency abroad, and while valid these stamps were not issued for circulation to the general public but sold directly to stamp dealers abroad and to registered philatelists. The DP invented the practice of producing a specific stamp in a set at an intentionally low number – called a Sperrwert (limited issue stamp) – to artificially increase the value of the stamp and the set. The first Sperrwert was the Mi #464. An example of a Sperrwert is the 25 Pfennig stamp of the 1981 postal set Mi #2587. The other stamps in the set were printed in quantities ranging from 4.5 million to 16 million, but only 2 million of the 25 Pfennig stamp were printed.

=== Distribution of periodicals and collection of radio and television fees ===
The DP also held a monopoly on the distribution of periodicals in the GDR, both retail and through subscription, as established by a law dated 3 April 1959. The DP maintained a central list of authorized periodicals, of both domestic and foreign origin. Failure to be included on this list amounted to a ban on circulation or sale of a periodical within the GDR. Authorized foreign periodicals almost always emanated from other socialist countries, such as the Soviet Union. Most distribution of periodicals took place via a network of kiosks throughout the GDR, including railway stations, roadside rest stops, and in urban areas. Delivery by subscription was relatively rare, owing in part to the fact that print runs of popular publications were normally never sufficient to meet demand.

Most West German (and other West European) publications were excluded from the list. However, by the late 1980s, even certain Soviet periodicals, such as the popular magazine Sputnik, were removed from the authorized distribution list, effectively resulting in a ban. However, in October 1989, the Ministry for Postal and Telecommunication Services announced that Sputnik had been restored to the list.

== Reunification ==
With the reunification of Germany on 3 October 1990, the DP became part of the Deutsche Bundespost, which in turn later became the privatized Deutsche Post AG on 1 January 1995. As part of the reunification process, the DP's stamps became valid also for the FRG and West Berlin, beginning on 2 July 1990, and vice versa, until their eventual expiration. The dates regarding the expiration of the validity of GDR stamps were established as follows: for stamps Mi #1004-#3343, they were invalid as of 1 October 1990, while for Mi #3344-#3365, they were invalid as of 12 December 1991.

== Organisation ==
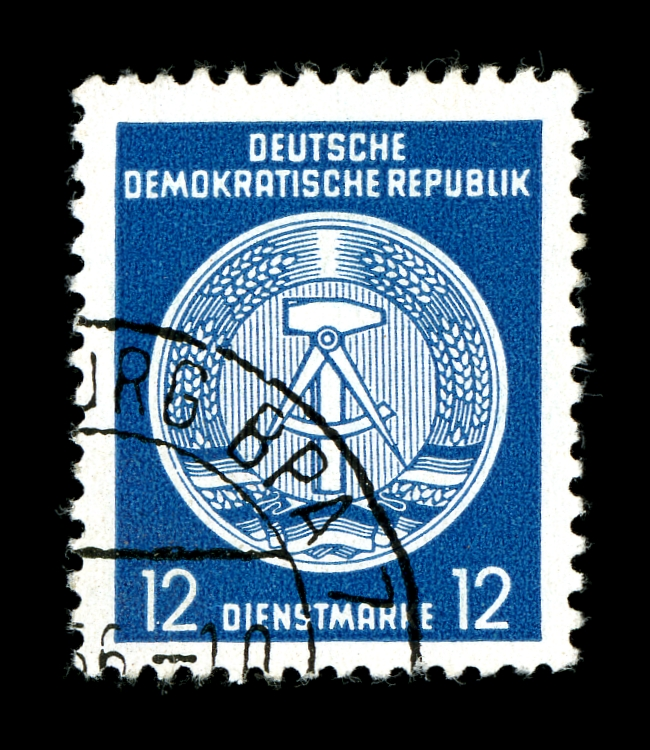
An official mail stamp displaying hammer and compass, the official coat of arms, (1954), Mi #20

The agency was divided into directorates (Direktionen), which in turn were subdivided into offices (Ämter). Further, the DP operated the production facilities for construction of telecommunications, technical services for radio and television, as well as related institutes for research, education, and learning.

The DP had its own flag – the German national flag, with the post horn in the centre. The colour for postal services was the traditional yellow, while telecommunications was grey, and radio and television technical services was dark blue. The postal uniforms were modified several times, and generally worn only in the postal service, while in the other services uniforms were usually displayed only for special events.

The following ranks were applied:

- Assistants (Unterassistent, Assistent, Oberassistent, Hauptassistent: 1 stripe, 1 to 4 stars)
- Secretaries (Untersekretär, Sekretär, Obersekretär, Hauptsekretär: 2 stripes, 1 to 4 stars)
- Inspectors (Inspektor, Oberinspektor, Amtmann: 3 stripes, 1 to 3 stars)
- Counsellors (Rat, Oberrat, Hauptrat: 1 broad stripe, 1 to 3 stars with oak leaves)
- Directors (Direktor, Oberdirektor, Hauptdirektor: 2 broad stripes, 1 to 3 stars with oak leaves)

The DP's civil servants were trained at the directorate schools - at the Engineering School Rosa Luxemburg in Leipzig, and at the College for Traffic Technology (Hochschule für Verkehrswesen) in Dresden (depicted on Mi #2587 above).

== See also ==
- Postage stamps and postal history of Germany
- Sperrwert

== References and sources ==
- The basis of this article is a shortened translation of the corresponding German Wikipedia article (with literature references) from 30 March 2008.

Sources

- Michel catalog (1997). Michel Deutschland Spezial 1997. Munich: Schwaneberger Verlag GmbH.
- Scott catalog (2006). Scott 2006 Standard Postage Stamp Catalogue, Volume3. Sidney, Ohio: Scott Publishing Co.
