= Kiautschou Governor's Hall =

Coordinates: 36.06444°N 120.31944°E

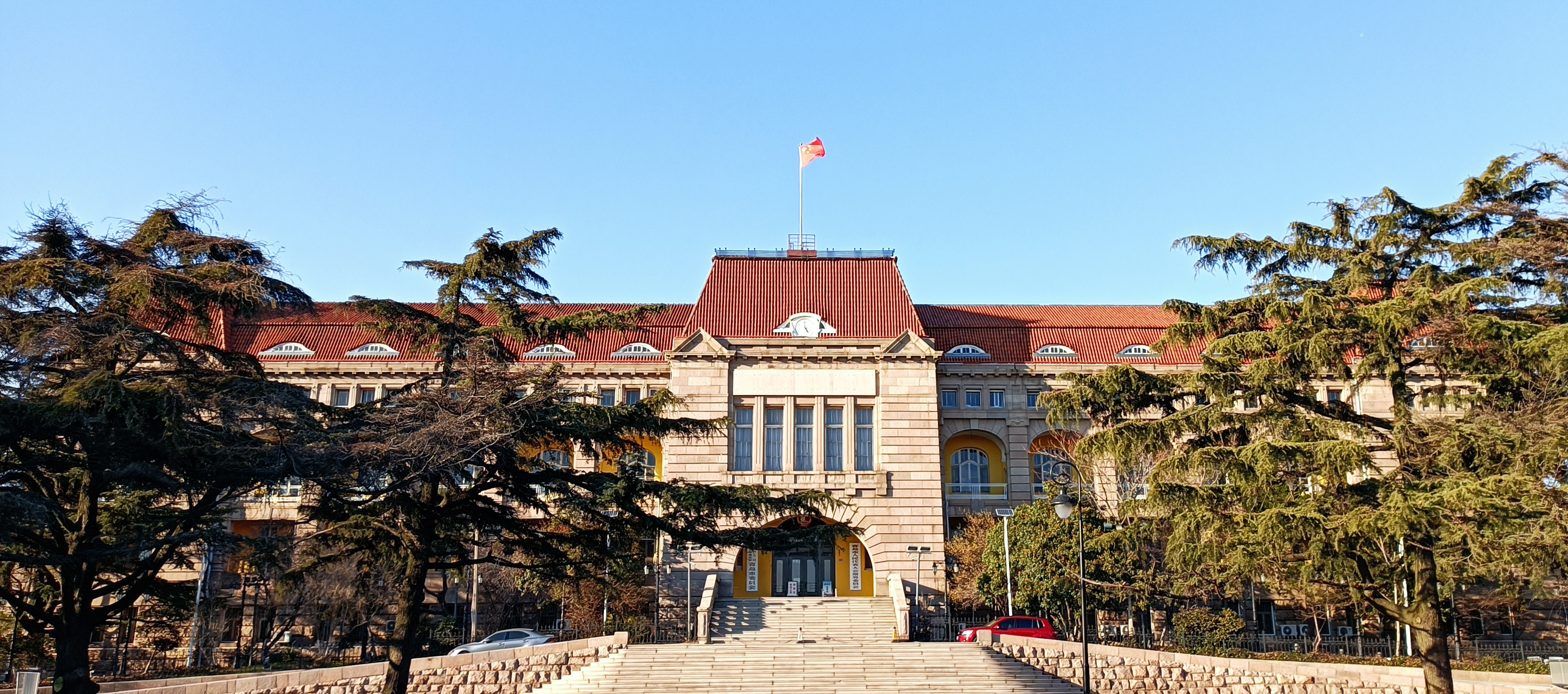
Kiautschou Governor's Hall in March 2021.

Kiautschou Governor's Hall (Chinese: 提督府; pinyin: Tídū Fǔ) is the former German colonial government building at Qingdao, China.

== History ==
The building was designed by the German architect Friedrich Mahlke (1871 – 1944) and was constructed during the years from 1904 to 1906. It was officially handed over to the administration on April 2, 1906. It has a gross space of 7,500 square meters.

The building originally served as the Kiautschou naval and civil government office and was known as Gouverneurspalast, or the Governor's Palace. After the Siege of Tsingtao in 1914, the building became the Japanese occupation headquarters until 1922, when China regained sovereignty over its province. Before and during World War II, Jioazhou Governor's Hall was again used by the Japanese as the seat of their occupation regime from 1938 to 1945. The building was subsequently used by the Kuomintang government and, after June 1949, by the People's Republic of China. It served as Qingdao's townhall until 1992.

== Gallery ==
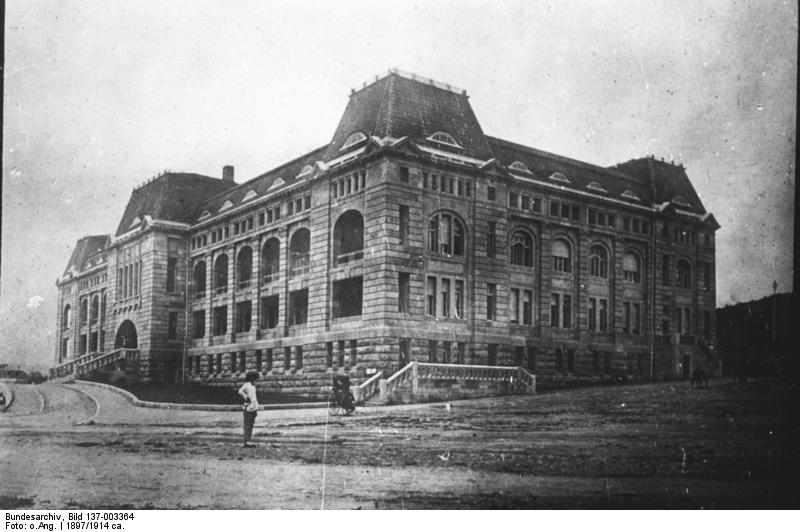
Colonial government building, 1907

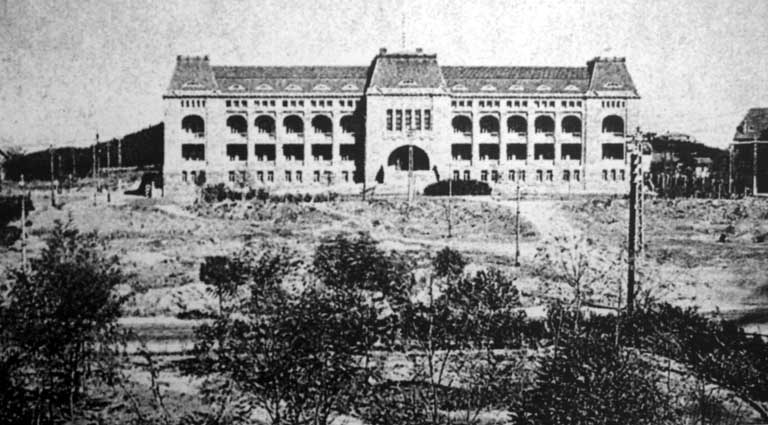
Southern view of the building, probably before 1910

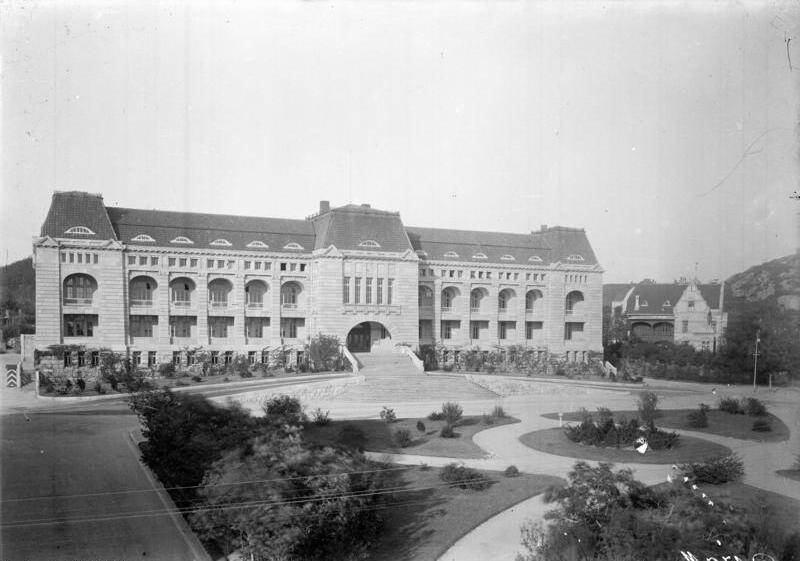
Colonial government building, 1913

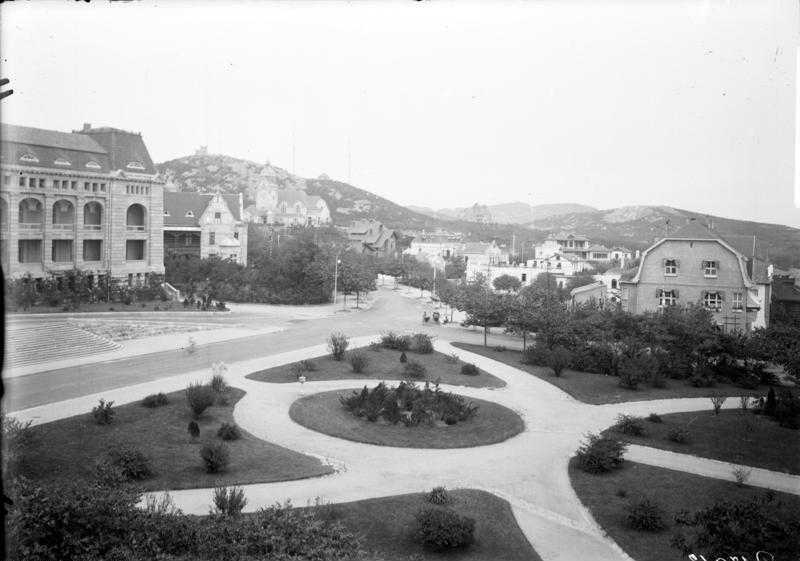
Diederichsweg [Diederichs Lane], Colonial government building at left, 1913

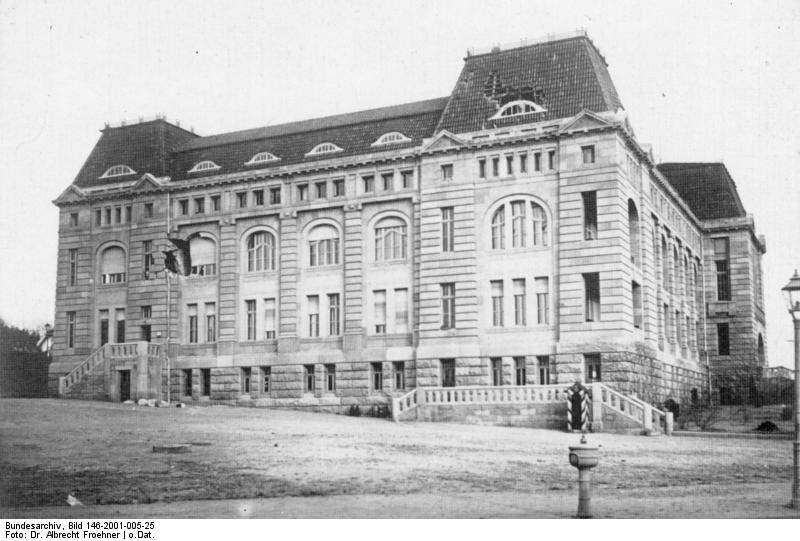
Artillery hits (2) during siege, west side of building, 1914

== See also ==
- Former Kiautschou Imperial Post Office
