= Old Post House, Wimbern =

Coordinates: 51°28′33″N 7°51′25″E

Old Post House
- Alte Poststation; Altepost
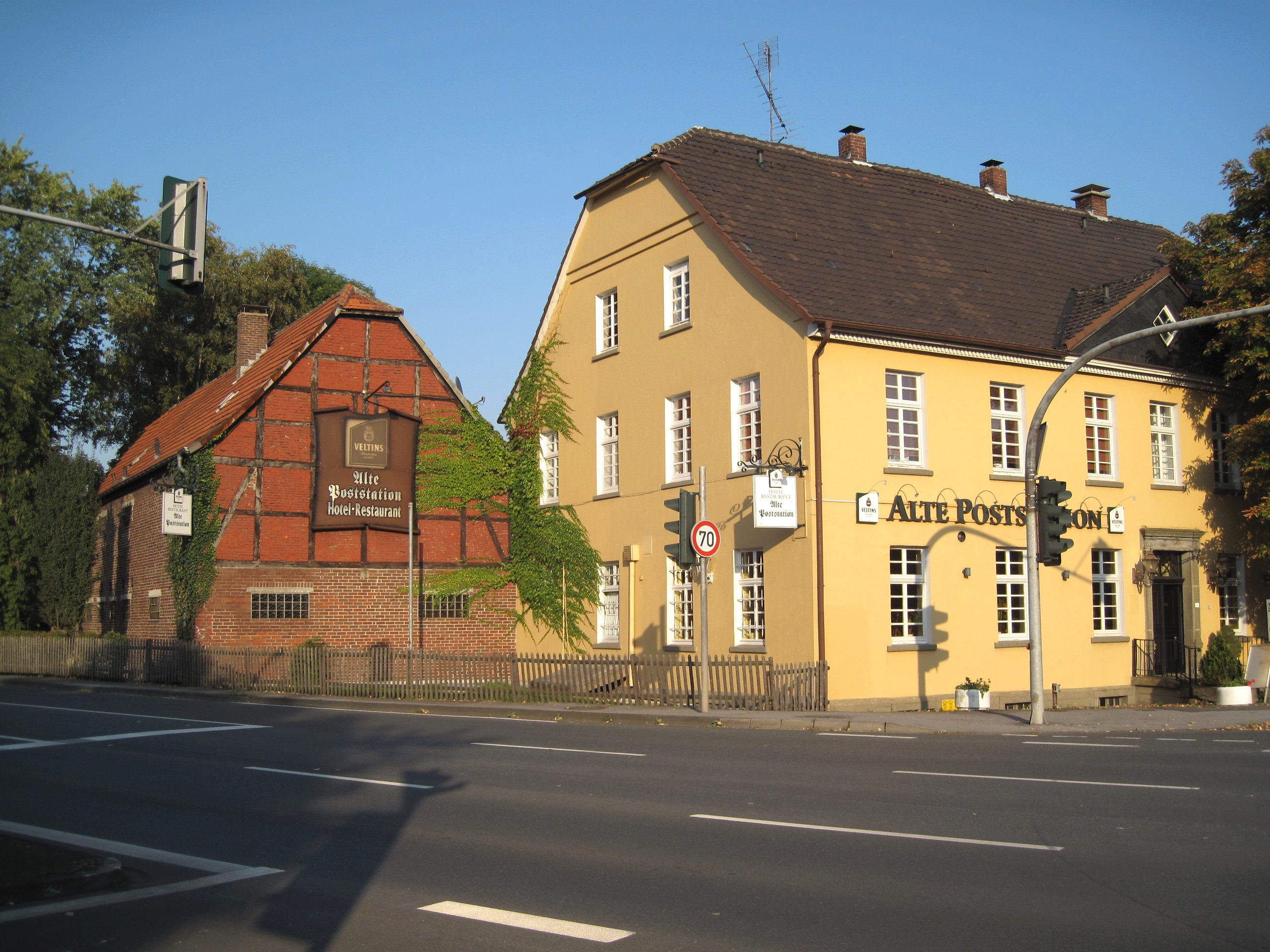
- Interactive map of the Old Post House area
- Alternative names: Altepost House

General information
- Location: Wimbern, Wickede, Germany
- Year built: 1822-1824
- Owner: Anton Schlünder (1839-1889)

Design and construction
- Architect: Christoph Schlünder

The Old Post House (German: Alte Poststation) in Wimbern, Wickede, also known as Altepost House, is a 19th-century post house, which remains standing today and is a cultural heritage site.

== History ==
The ground on which Altepost was built was owned by the Schlünder family since 1474. The building was originally commissioned and designed by Post Master Christoph Schlünder (1746–1820) to replace a former building from the 17th century, and was built between 1822 and 1824 by his son and successor Nicolaus Schlünder (1787–1839). He was the first to combine his father's agricultural business with the post office. Final renovations were finished by the third generation Schlünder Postmaster, Anton Schlünder (1825–1889), who held his position the longest and raised his nine children here.

Post offices were a great source of income at the time, especially at a time where most travel happened by carriages, which needed to change horses often. In 1826, the Old Post House was even visited by King Frederick William III. Anton Schlünder also operated the 'Am Schlünder' waiting room, another source of income, where the travellers could warm up, freshen up, and order coffee.

However, in 1871, after the unification of the German Empire, the Reichspost ("Imperial Mail") was introduced, and making a profit through independent postal services became illegal. Altepost continued to rent out carriages and horses, but this business too was made obsolute by the industrialisation of the later 19th century, which introduced more available cars and a national railways system for Germany. Anton Schlünder pivoted again and made Altepost the headquarters for his new dairy company, for which he bought several farms. Sometime after the introduction of the Weimar Republic in 1918, the family sold the property.

Since 2000, the building has operated as a hotel and restaurant.

== Architecture ==
The Old Post House is a two-story building with an attic underneath a hip roof. The house is mainly made from bricks, but features a portal made from dimension stone, as is an architrave. The kitchen, located on the ground floor, still features an original fireplace, as well as the original floor made from natural stone.

Behind the main building are the carriage house and the stables.

== Sources ==
- Dehio, Georg, unter wissenschaftlicher Leitung von Ursula Quednau: Handbuch der deutschen Kunstdenkmäler. Nordrhein-Westfalen II Westfalen. Deutscher Kunstverlag, Berlin/München 2011, ISBN 978-3-422-03114-2
