= Former Kiautschou Imperial Post Office =

Imperial German post office in China

Former German Kiaochou Post Office
- 德国胶州邮政局旧址 (Chinese)
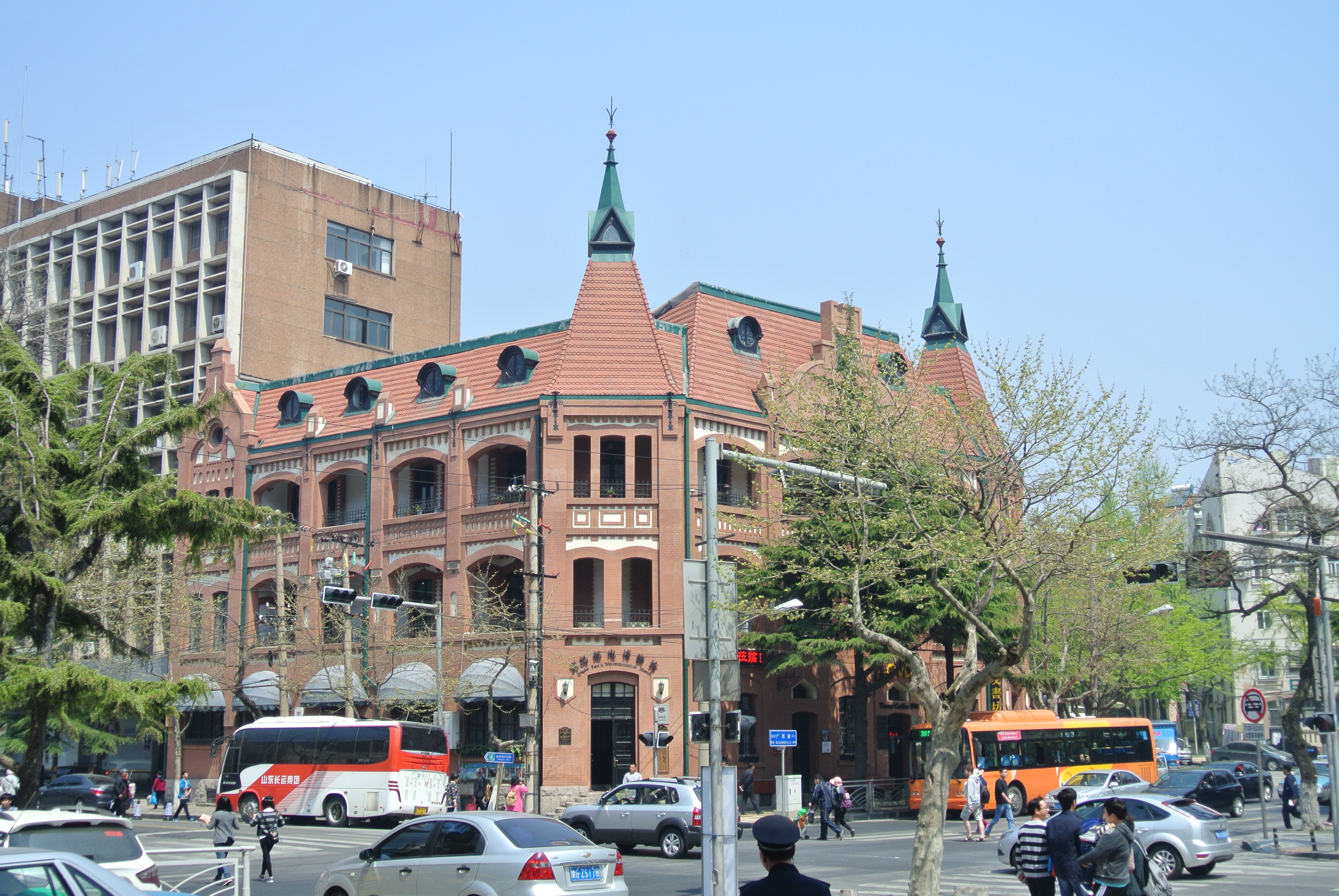
- The former Kiautschou Imperial Post Office in 2015
- Interactive map of Former German Kiaochou Post Office
- 36°03′47.8″N 120°19′00″E
- Location: Shinan District, Qingdao, Shandong, China

History
- Built: 1900–1901

Site notes
- Architectural style: German Colonial architecture
- Governing body: Major historical and cultural sites protected by Shandong Province

Former Kiautschou Imperial Post Office (German: Kaiserliches Postamt Kiautschou), also known as the Kiautschou Imperial Post Office or the Qingdao German Imperial Post Office, was the postal administration office of the Kiautschou Bay Leased Territory. Its former site is located at No. 5 Anhui Road (including No. 3A Anhui Road and No. 21 Guangxi Road), at the intersection of Anhui Road, Guangxi Road, and Juxian Road in Shinan District, Qingdao, Shandong, China. The building was constructed between 1900 and 1901. It was subsequently used for postal and telecommunications services for an extended period, and was colloquially known as the “Guangxi Road Post Office” or “Guangxi Road Posts and Telecommunications Bureau”. The building is now protected as the Former German Kiaochou Post Office, a Major historical and cultural sites protected by Shandong Province, and houses the Qingdao Postal and Telecommunications Museum.

== History ==
=== Establishment of postal services ===
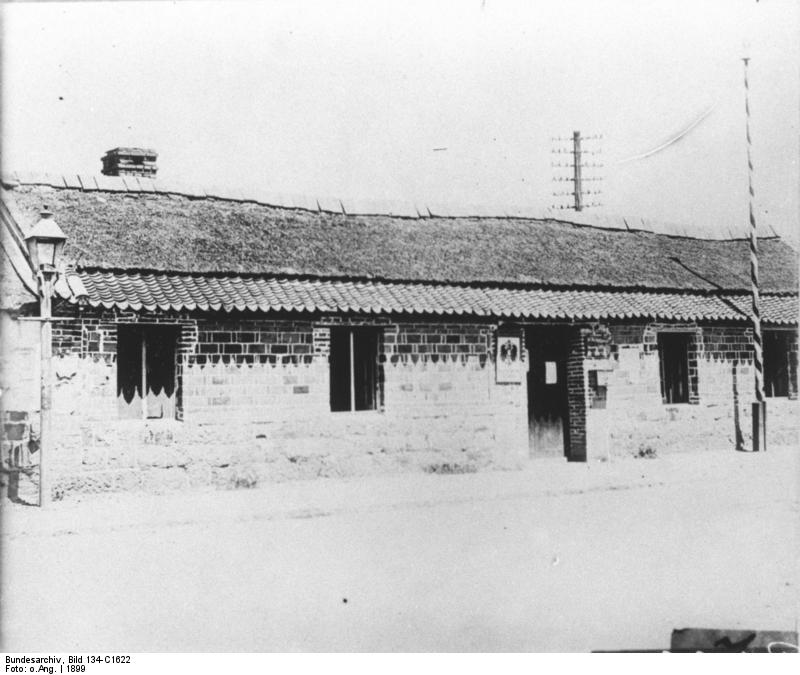
The temporary postal agency

Shortly after the Imperial German Navy occupied Qingdao during the Jiaozhou Bay Incident on 14 November 1897, two officials of the German postal administration arrived in the territory aboard the steamship Darmstadt together with more than 1,000 German naval infantrymen. One was a telegraph operator and the other a communications-line maintenance technician. They were accompanied by an employee of the German postal agency in Shanghai, who assisted in establishing postal services in Qingdao. On 26 January 1898, the day the contingent arrived in Qingdao, the Reichspost received a telegram from 'Tsintanfort', (Note: Tsintan was a misspelling of Qingdao. This error remained in use until 30 March 1898, when it was corrected to Tsintau, and was later changed to the more commonly used Tsingtau in June 1900.) announcing that a German naval field post office had begun operations.

The field post office and the later temporary postal agency initially operated from a traditional Chinese building located west of the former headquarters of the Qing dynasty commander, near the present site south of the former European Prison in Qingdao. (Note: It no longer exists and was demolished in the early 1900s. Today, No. 9, Changzhou Road, Qingdao Mosque, was once mistakenly regarded as the former site of a temporary postal agency.) The road in front of the building was briefly known as Post Office Street (Poststraße). In May 1898, Prince Henry of Prussia, then commander of the German East Asia Squadron, visited the temporary postal agency and emphasized the importance of postal facilities for the development of trade and for maintaining orderly communications between Qingdao and the outside world. He subsequently called for the construction of a dedicated post office building. In 1899, the Kiautschou Bay Leased Territory joined the Universal Postal Union.

Unlike most governmental institutions in the leased territory, the postal administration was not subordinate to either the Kiautschou Governor's Hall or the German Navy. Instead, it reported directly to the Imperial Postal Administration. From 22 April 1898, it was administered through the German postal agency in Shanghai. Later that year, due to the increasing workload in Shanghai, the Qingdao postal agency began settling its accounts directly with the Bremen Main Post Office Building, although Shanghai retained supervisory authority. This arrangement occasionally led to disputes between the postal authorities and the colonial administration, particularly over the control of telegraph and telephone services. Paul Jaeschke, the second governor of Kiautschou, criticized the official postal monopoly and argued that private enterprise could operate postal services more efficiently. Nevertheless, following negotiations between the Imperial Postal Administration and German naval authorities, the postal system retained its autonomous status until the Japanese capture of Qingdao in 1914.

=== Construction and expansion ===
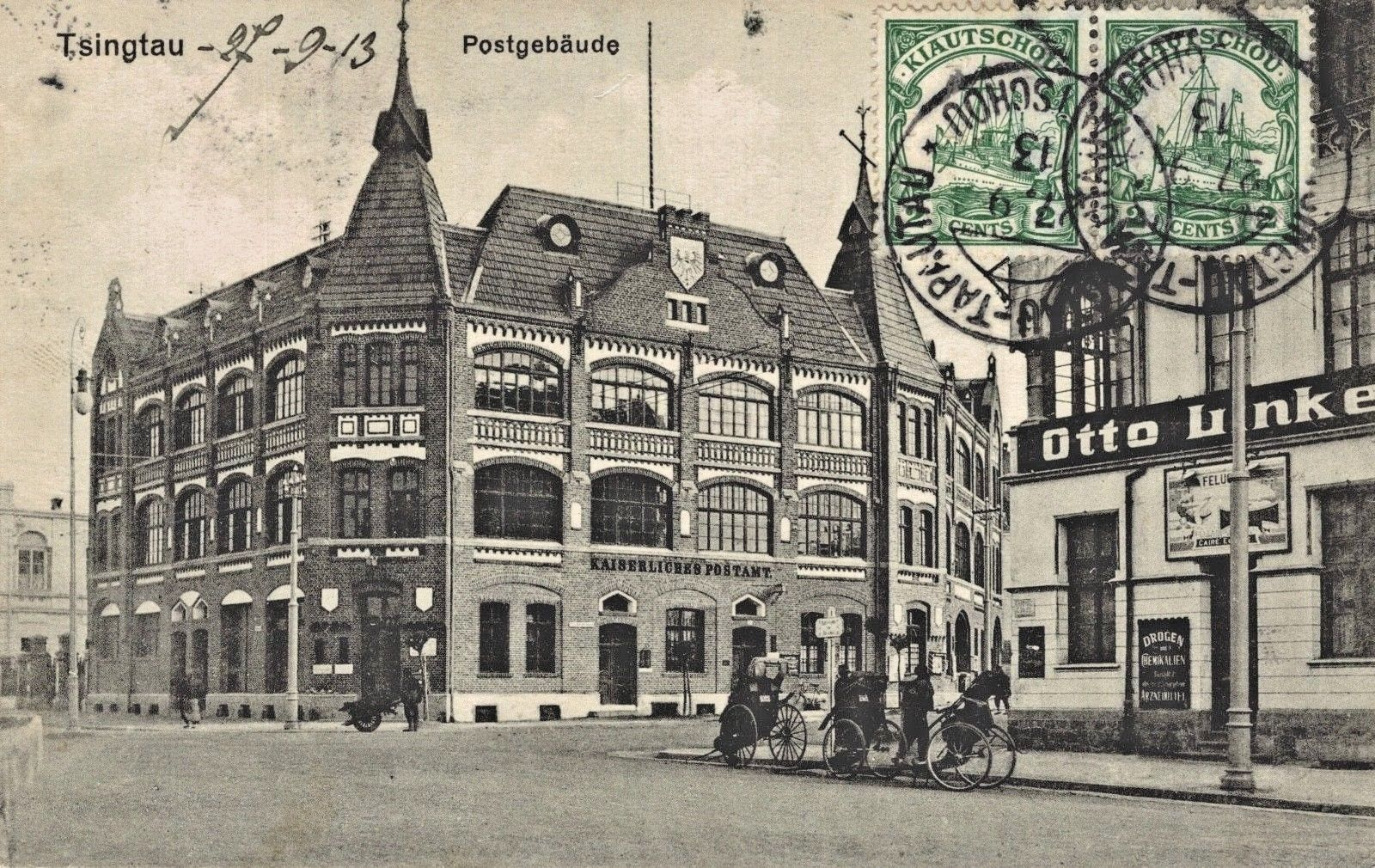
Postcard of the Jiaozhou Imperial Post Office building, with two 2-cent Jiaozhou stamps in the upper right corner, postmarked at Dabaodao and mailed on 27 September 1913

On 1 June 1900, the temporary postal agency was upgraded to a full post office and assumed responsibility for all German postal facilities within the leased territory and in areas extending 50 kilometres beyond its borders. The original post office building had become structurally unsafe, and the postal administration therefore agreed with the Kiautschau Company (Kiautschau-Gesellschaft mbH) to construct a post office building. The post office building was located at the intersection of Prinz-Heinrich-Straße (present-day Guangxi Road), Albertstraße (present-day Anhui Road), and Tirpitzstraße (present-day Juxian Road), and was constructed by F. H. Schmidt. It was completed and opened for service on 16 May 1901. The postal service hall was located on the first floor of the building, while the second and third floors were staff accommodation. The post office leased the building from the Kiautschau Company at an annual rent of 20,000 German marks. On 22 November 1910, the post office purchased the building together with its 2,563-square-metre site for 250,000 marks.

The post office handled ordinary and registered mail, newspaper subscriptions, postal remittances, insured correspondence, parcel services, telegraph communications, and telephone services. Postal connections between Qingdao and Germany were maintained primarily through mail-steamer routes via Shanghai. A direct overland route through Siberia was opened on 1 October 1903, but was interrupted shortly thereafter by the Russo-Japanese War. In April 1901, the Kiautschou Imperial Post Office began issuing its own postage stamps, featuring the imperial yacht SMY Hohenzollern (1892), with denominations in German marks and pfennig, each denomination printed in a different color.On 1 February 1902, the postal administration announced that stamp denominations would be converted into Chinese currency units of yuan and fen, with German currency values converted at half face value.On 1 October 1905, a second issue of Kiautschou stamps was released, retaining the same design but adopting the yuan-and-fen denomination system.In addition to circulation within the leased territory, these stamps were also valid at German post offices in Jiaozhou, Weixian, and Jinan along the Qingdao–Jinan railway.They remained in use until German postal operations ceased in 1914.

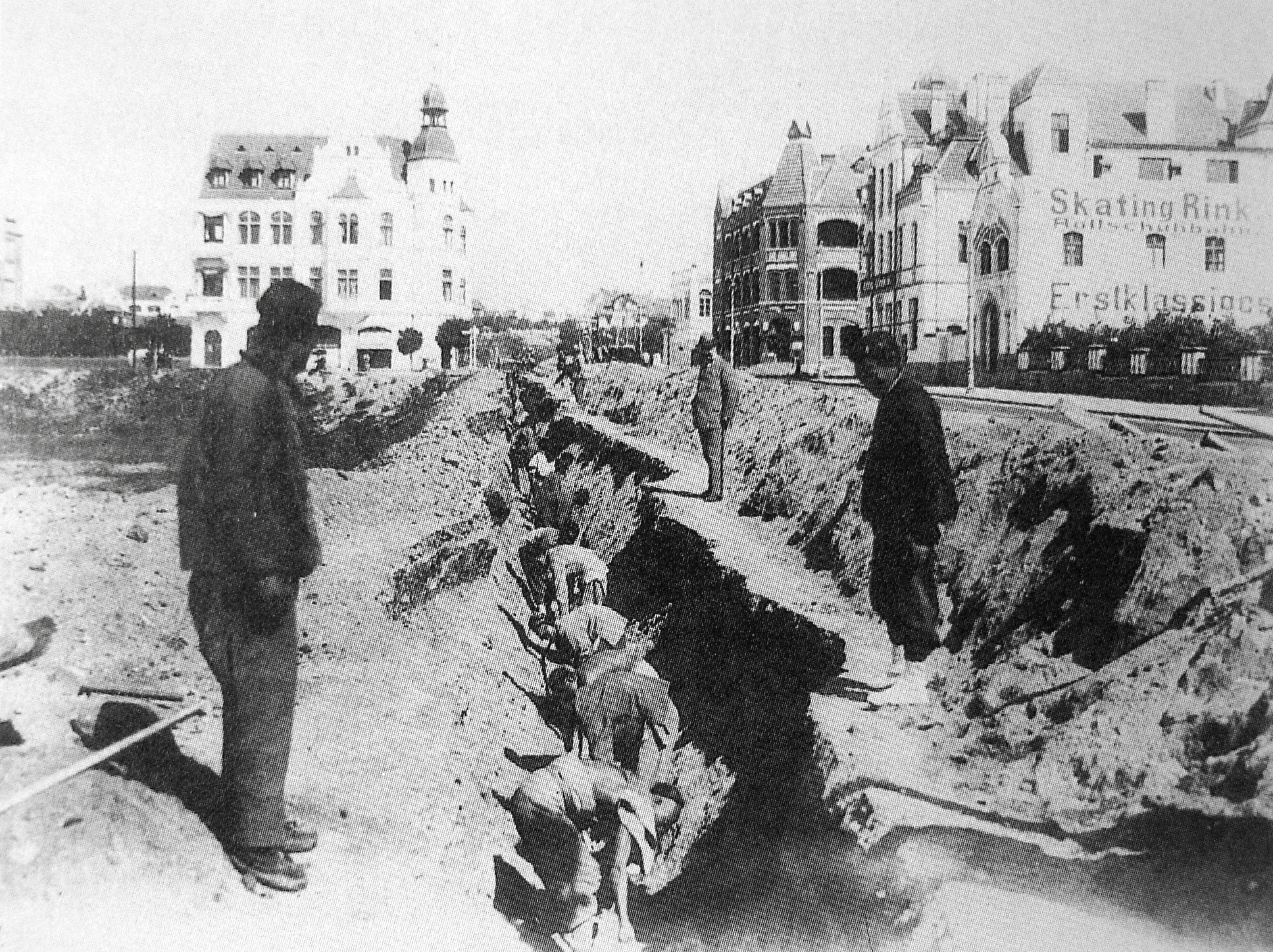
Cable-laying works south of the post office, c. 1900s

Before the German occupation of Qingdao, Qing troops under Zhang Gaoyuan had laid a telegraph line from Qingdao to Jinan. In 1900, in order to reduce reliance on the Qingdao–Jinan telegraph line, still operated by the Chinese telegraph office, the Kiautschou Imperial Post Office spent 3,122,165 marks to lay a total of 646 nautical miles of submarine telegraph lines from Qingdao to Yantai and from Qingdao to Wusongkou. Telephone service in Qingdao began on 1 June 1899, when a public telephone exchange was established, and by the end of that month, 26 subscribers had been connected. A separate telephone system for the Governor's Office was also installed, consisting of 19 telephone sets. In 1900, the post office handled an average of 231 calls per day. By October 1909, the number of subscribers had risen to 146, while the Governor's Office maintained 87 dedicated telephone lines, and the post office was handling an average of 1,314 calls per working day.

With the construction of the Jiaoji Railway, the Imperial Post Office established branch offices in Jiaozhou, Gaomi, Weixian, Qingzhou, Zhoucun, and Jinan along the railway line, prompting protests from the Qing government. Meanwhile, the postal district of Jiaozhou under the Imperial Chinese Post within the leased territory (administered by the Jiaozhou Customs and transferred to the Ministry of Posts and Communications in 1911) continued to exist alongside the German Imperial Post Office, and the German side also at times attempted to marginalize the Chinese postal institution. In 1905, China and Germany signed the Provisional Regulations for the Exchange of Mail between Chinese and German Post Offices, under which the Chinese side recognized the German post office in Jinan as an official exchange post office, the status of the German post office in Weixian was to be decided separately and was temporarily recognized, and all other German branch offices were to be abolished, while the German side recognized the Chinese post office already established in Qingdao. Beginning in 1906, the German branch offices in Jiaozhou, Qingzhou, and Zhoucun were gradually closed.

By 1912, the postal administration operated ten post offices within the leased territory, eight of which provided telegraph services and two of which offered telephone services. The network included approximately 35 kilometres of land-based telephone lines and 1,160 kilometres of submarine cables. In 1914, the post office had 9 senior and intermediate German postal civil servants, 2 junior civil servants, and 15 intermediate Chinese employees and 25 ordinary Chinese employees.

=== After 1914 ===
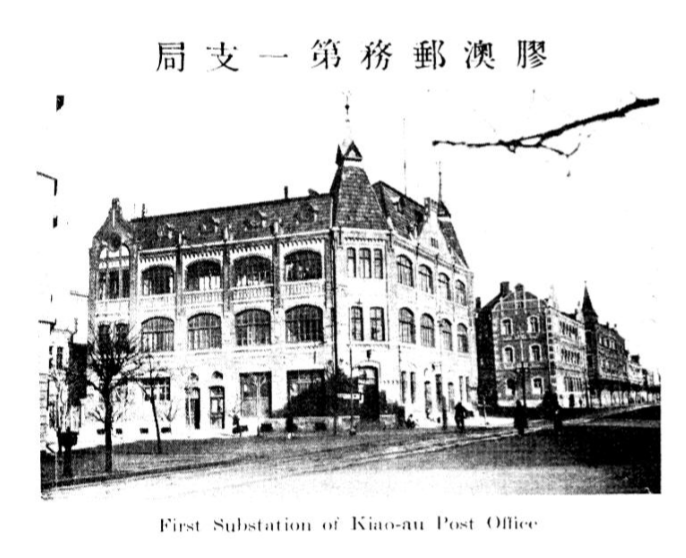
The First Branch Office of the Jiaozhou Postal Administration

In August 1914, the Siege of Tsingtao broke out. Before Japanese forces landed at Longkou in early September, the post office had already transferred important technical materials, equipment, and a batch of stamps to Shanghai and Jinan. On 5 November, shortly before the surrender of the German and Austro-Hungarian defenders, the Kiautschou Imperial Post Office ceased all postal and telecommunication services and destroyed its remaining stamps, postmarks, two telegraph transmitters, and the German postal flag. On 16 November, the Japanese army took over the building and established a field postal office. German postal staff who had not participated in the fighting left Qingdao in December, while the others were treated as prisoners of war.

In September 1917 (according to another source, November 1918), the Japanese field postal office was reorganized into the Qingdao Post Office under the Civil Administration Department of the Qingdao Garrison (Imperial Japanese Army). Its headquarters remained in the former Kiautschou Imperial Post Office building. In January 1920, the Qingdao Post Office relocated to its new building on Tokuzawa-chō (present-dayTangyi Road ),while the former building was converted into the Saga-machi Branch Office of the Qingdao Post Office. After the Beiyang government recovered sovereignty over Qingdao in December 1922, it took over the postal facilities through redemption. The First-Class Qingdao Post Office (also known as the Jiaozhou Commercial Port Postal Administration, formerly the Jiaozhou Postal District under the Great Qing Post) replaced the Japanese Qingdao Post Office as the main postal authority in the city. The former imperial post office building on Guangxi Road was redesignated as its First Branch Office.

In October 1924, the Chinese Telegraph Bureau of Jiaozhou moved from Shandong Road (now Zhongshan Road(QingDao)) into the eastern wing of the building, while the postal branch occupied the western section on the ground floor. After the Nationalist government took over the telegraph bureau in July 1929, it was renamed the Qingdao Telegraph Bureau of the Ministry of Communications. In June 1935, Qingdao's central wireless station was merged into the bureau, and its radio receiving station was relocated to the third floor of the building. In January 1938, during the second Japanese occupation of Qingdao, the Japanese authorities took control of the telegraph and telephone bureaus. However, the post office remained under British administration until the outbreak of the Pacific War in 1941, when British and American nationals were arrested. In April 1938, the telegraph and telephone bureaus were placed under the North China Telecommunications Administration, and in August were reorganized into the Qingdao Telegraph and Telephone Headquarters of the North China Telecommunications Company. In April 1945, it was renamed the Qingdao Communications Bureau. After the end of the Second Sino-Japanese War, it was taken over by the Ministry of Communications of the Nationalist government in December and renamed the Qingdao Telecommunications Bureau.

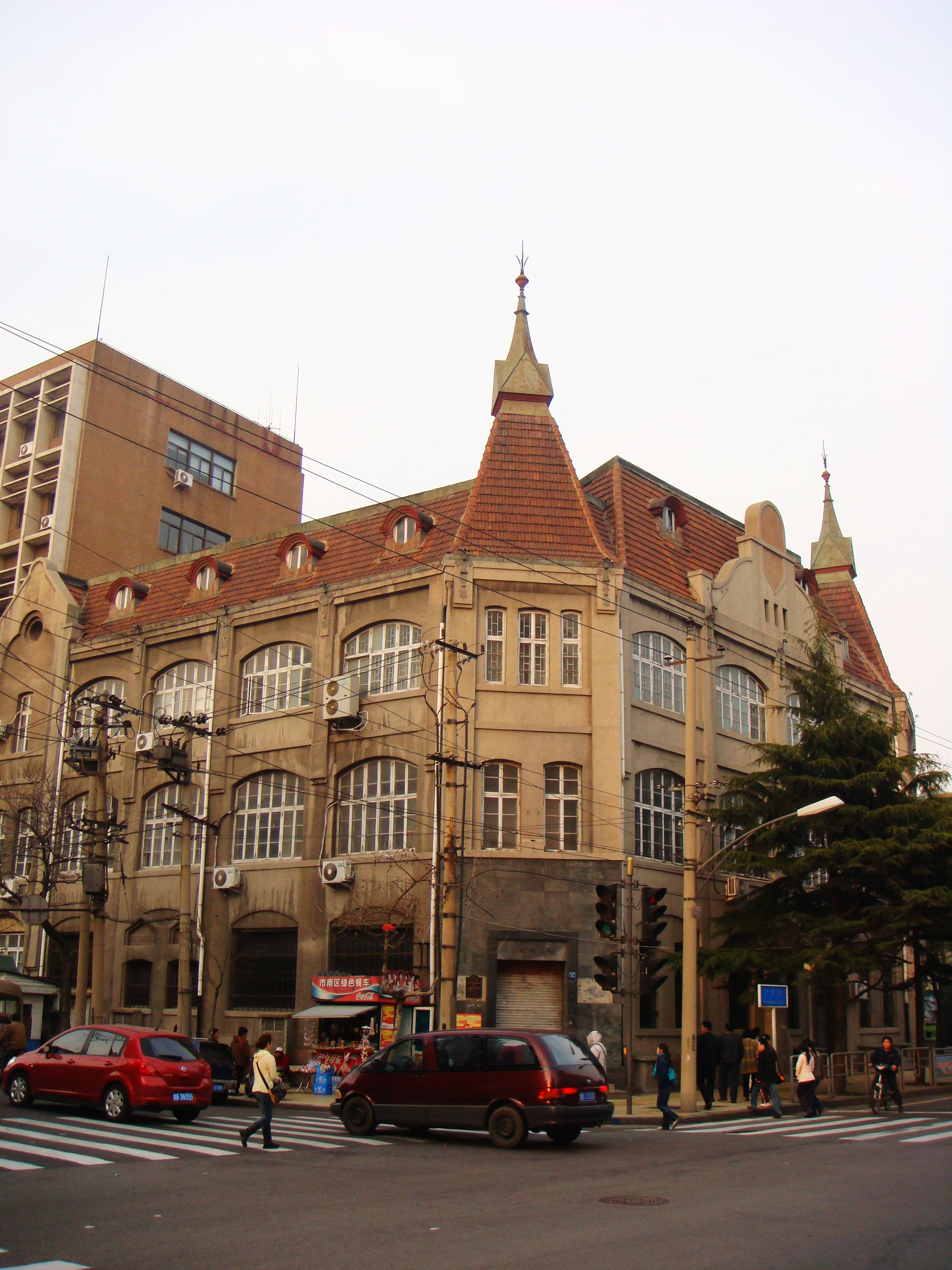
The former post office before restoration in 2007

On 2 June 1949, the Posts and Telecommunications Department of the Qingdao Military Control Commission of the People's Liberation Army took over the First-Class Qingdao Post Office, the Qingdao Telecommunications Bureau, and the Qingdao branch of the Chunghwa Post. In August, the remittance bureau was merged into the post office. On 1 August 1951, the post office and telecommunications bureau were merged to form the Qingdao Posts and Telecommunications Bureau, which was renamed the Qingdao Municipal Posts and Telecommunications Bureau of Shandong Province on 1 December 1955. On 30 August 1962, the administrative departments of the Qingdao Posts and Telecommunications Bureau moved from the former Qingdao Post Office on Tangyi Road back into the former Kiautschou Imperial Post Office building. The building thereafter served for decades as the main office and business hall of Qingdao's postal and telecommunications system. In 1982, after the completion of the adjacent Qingdao Posts and Telecommunications Bureau Office Building, the postal and telephone service halls were relocated there, while the telegraph hall remained in the historic building. In 1994, a data communications service hall and demonstration center were established inside the building.

During the postal reforms of 1998, the Qingdao Posts and Telecommunications Bureau was divided into separate postal and telecommunications administrations, and the building was transferred to the Qingdao Telecommunications Bureau. In 2000, it was listed among the first batch of Qingdao Historic Buildings. On 8 February 2001, the Qingdao Telecommunications Bureau was reorganized into the Qingdao Branch of Shandong Telecom. In September 2002, it became the Qingdao Branch of China Netcom, and on 16 November 2004, it was renamed Qingdao Branch of China Netcom Group Co. Ltd. During this period, the former post office building served as the customer service center of Qingdao Netcom. In 2008, following the merger of China Netcom and China Unicom, ownership of the building was inherited by the Qingdao branch of China Unicom.

=== Qingdao Postal and Telecommunications Museum ===
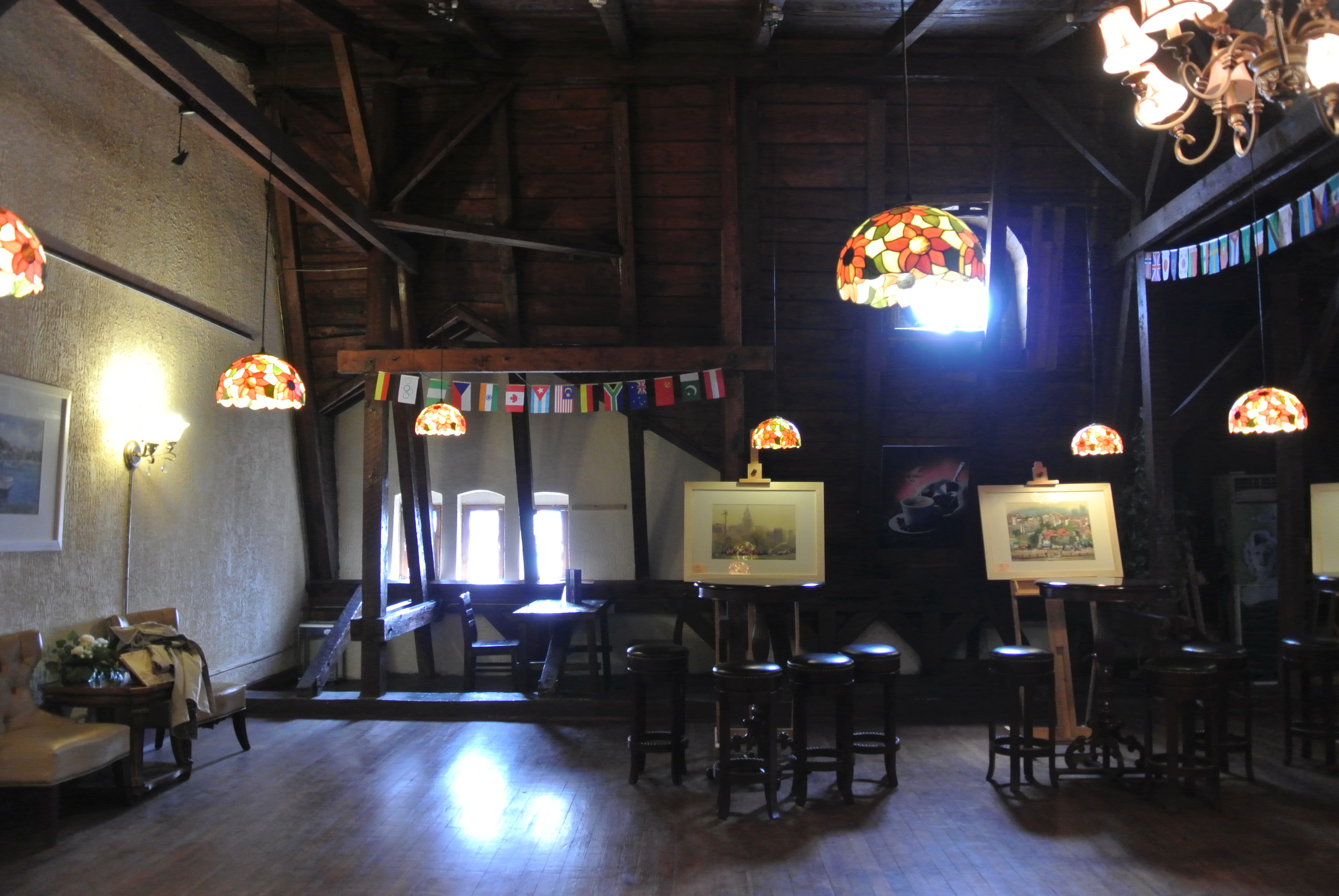
The attic of the former Kiautschou Imperial Post Office, 2015

In 2009, China Unicom's Qingdao branch invested nearly 10 million yuan in restoring the building. The restoration plan was publicly announced on 8 June, and after more than four months of work, the project was largely completed in October of the same year. The company originally planned to establish a VIP service hall in the building and considered setting up a small exhibition space for historical artifacts. The restoration reinstated decorative details that had disappeared over time and sought to preserve the building's original appearance. On 27 July 2009, the building was included in the first batch of cultural heritage protection units in Shinan District.

After the restoration was completed, China Unicom established the Qingdao Postal and Telecommunications Museum in the building, showcasing the development of postal and telecommunications services in Qingdao from the late nineteenth century to the present day. The museum officially opened to the public on 21 November 2010.It was temporarily closed in January 2013; according to Unicom staff, the closure was due to regulations preventing listed companies from operating businesses unrelated to their principal activities. Following internal adjustments, the museum reopened on 18 May 2014. In February 2018, the building was designated as part of the tenth batch of Qingdao Municipal Cultural Heritage Protection Units, and on 14 January 2022, it was further listed in the sixth batch of Major historical and cultural sites protected by Shandong Province. At present, parts of the first floor and the entire second floor are occupied by the Qingdao Postal and Telecommunications Museum, while the third floor serves as office space for the Qingdao Postal Administration. The eastern section of the first floor and the attic (fourth floor) are occupied by Liangyou Bookstore, operated under the Qingdao Daily Media Group. (Note: The attic originally housed the Tower · 1901café operated by the Qingdao Postal and Telecommunications Museum.)

== Architecture ==
The former Jiaozhou Imperial Post Office is located at the junction of Anhui Road, Guangxi Road, and Juxian Road, facing all three streets. The building covers an area of 1,491.6 square metres. It is a brick-and-timber structure consisting of three storeys above ground, one basement level, and an attic. The building's elevations extend along the streets in an asymmetrical arrangement. It is built on a granite foundation, with most exterior walls constructed of exposed red brickwork outlined with plaster bands, while lighter plastered wall surfaces appear around the arches and in other selected sections. The second and third floors originally featured open loggias, which were later enclosed with arched windows. At the corner where the two roads intersect stand two pointed-roof towers, while the cornice between them rises into a curvilinear gable. Smaller gables at the eastern and western ends further emphasize the building's lateral wings. The roof is steeply pitched, with the street-facing side having a sharper incline and being covered with red tiles, punctuated by circular dormer windows. The rear-facing slope is gentler and covered with metal sheeting.

== Gallery ==
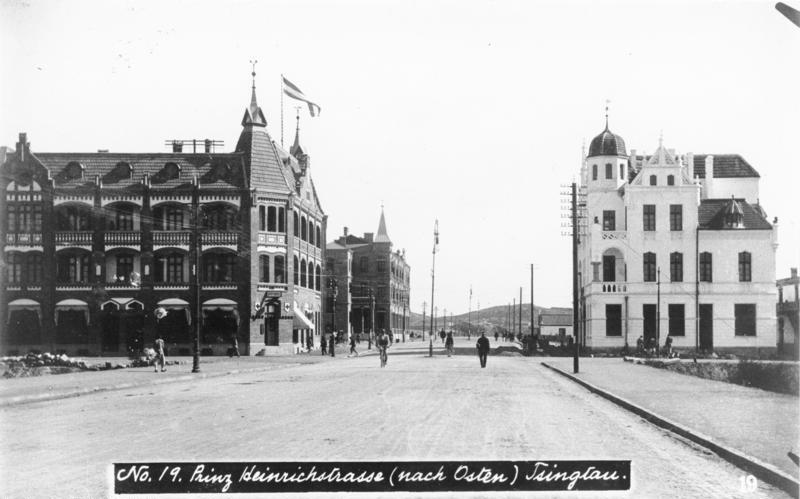
Intersection of Guangxi Road and Anhui Road in the early 1900s. The Imperial Post Office is on the left.

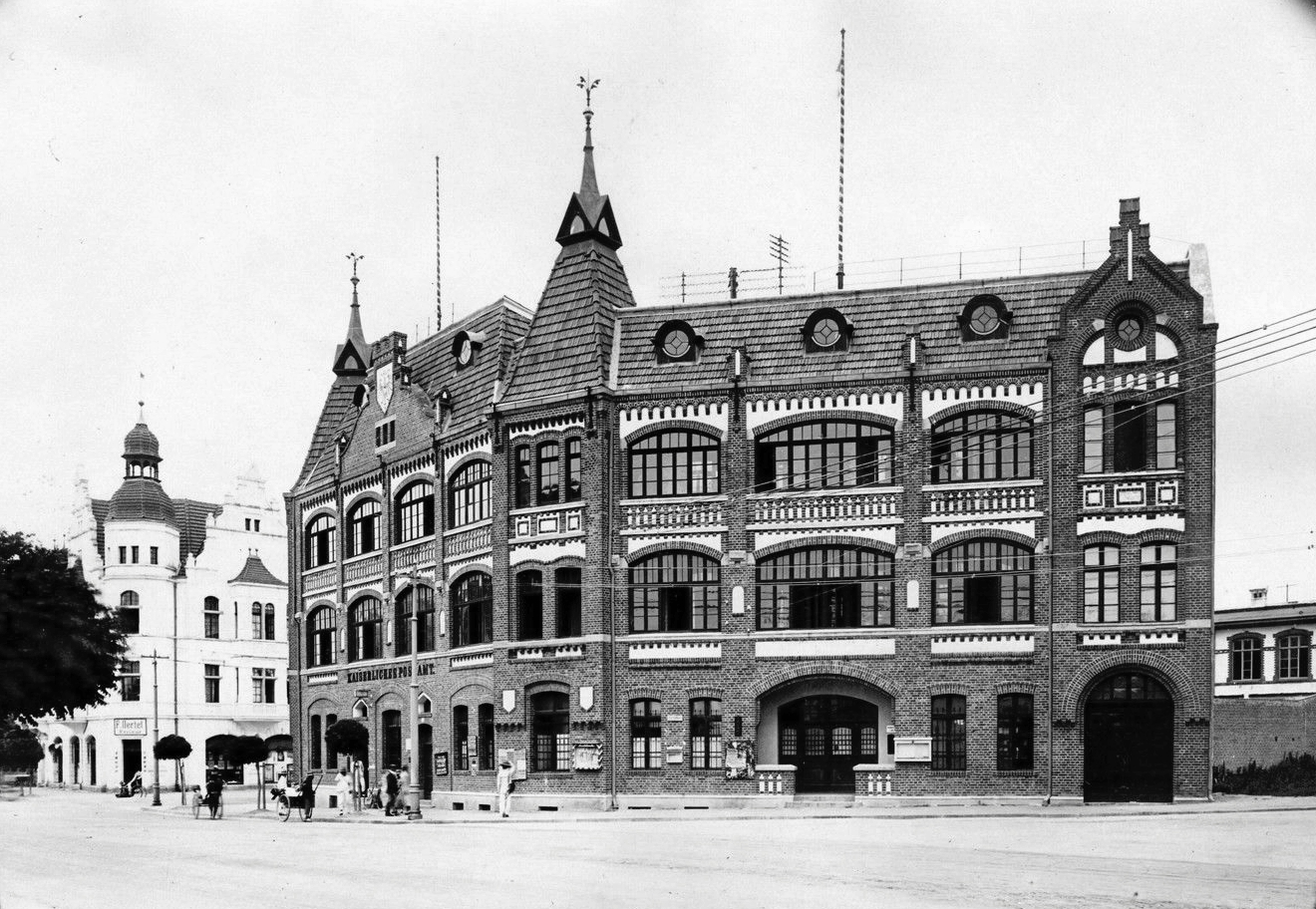
Southeastern side of the Imperial Post Office in the 1910s.

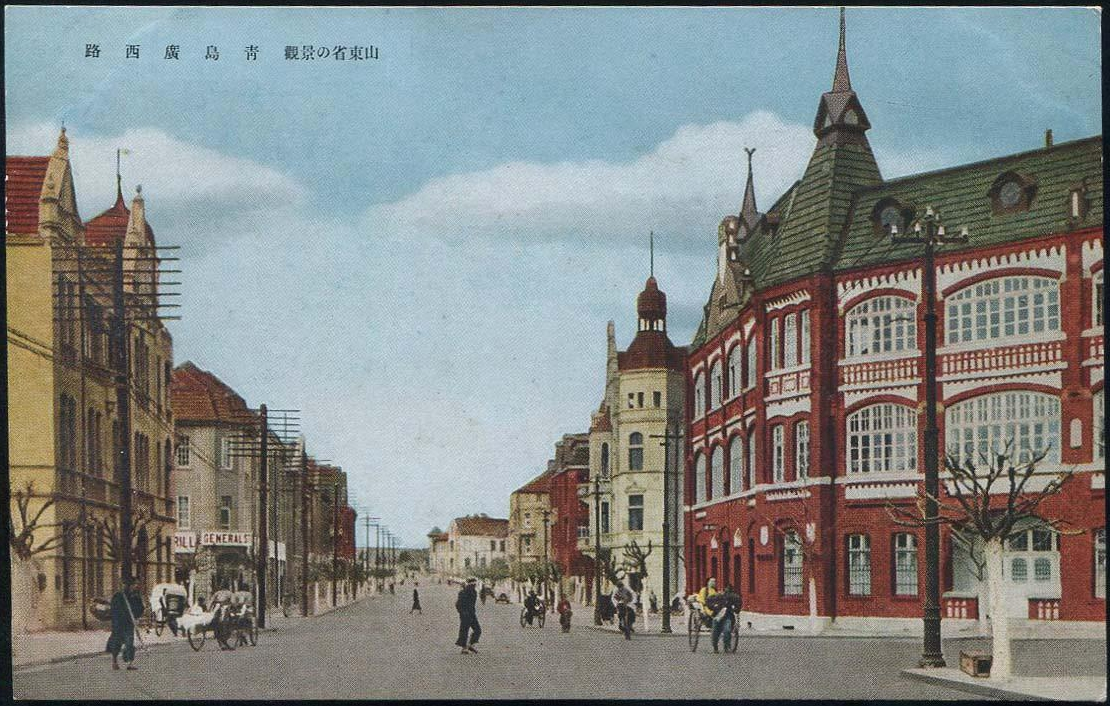
Hand-coloured postcard during the Republican period.

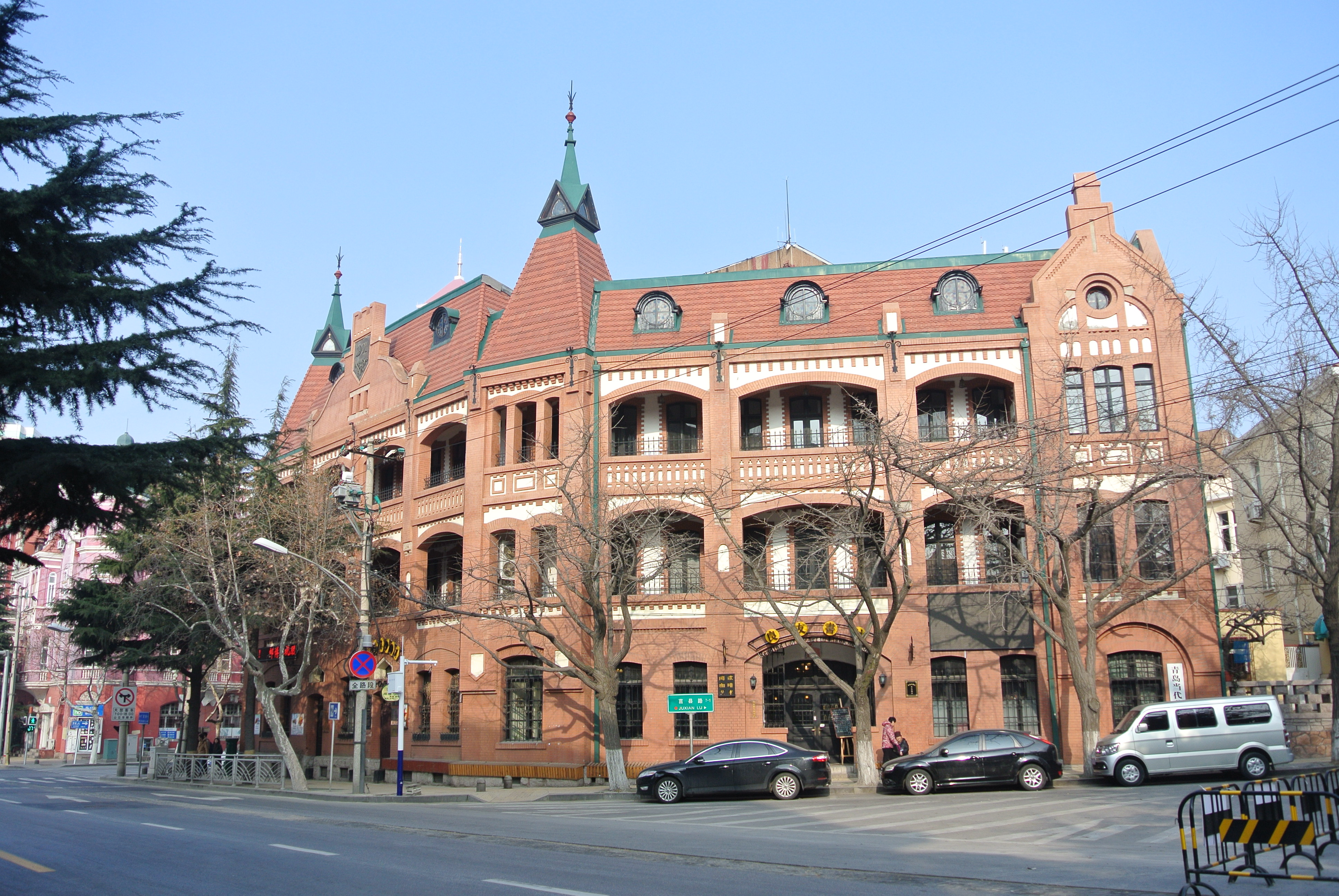
Former Imperial Post Office, 2016.

== See also ==
- Kiautschou Bay Leased Territory
- Jiaoji Railway
- Qingdao Post Office.
