= Reichsabgabe =

Tax on postal traffic in Germany during WWI

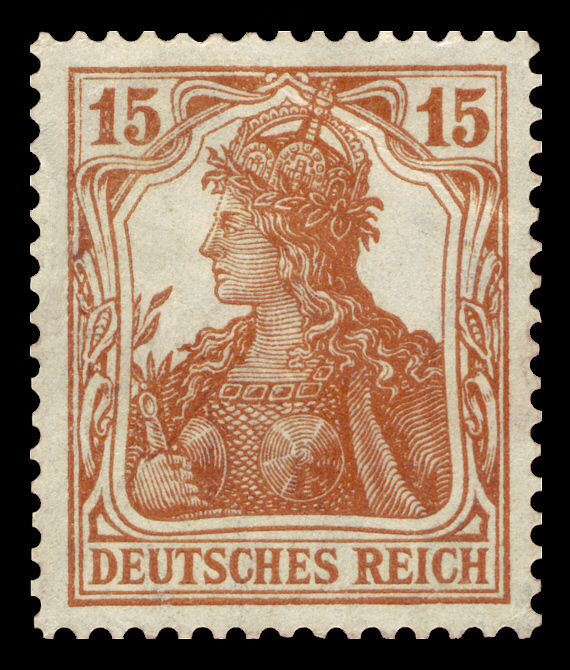

The Reichsabgabe was a tax on the postal traffic, levied in the German Empire during the First World War. It was introduced to finance the war expenses. The tax was announced in the ‘Tariff Law’ (Gebührengesetz) of 21 June 1916 and became effective with the new postal rates of 1 August 1916.

In practice the Reichsabgabe meant a raising of the postal rates, the revenues of which streamed into the treasury of the State instead of the treasury of the Deutsche Reichspost, the German postal service. The increase of the postal rates was confined to domestic letters and postcards; international mail and printed matters were excepted.

On 1 October 1918 the Reichsabgabe was raised. Now the printed matter rate was not excepted.

The effects of the Reichsabgabe are illustrated in the following table:

| Postal item | From 1906-07-01 | From 1916-08-01 | From 1918-10-01 |
|---|---|---|---|
| local letter | 5 Pfennig | 7½ Pfennig | 10 Pfennig |
| local postcard | 5 Pfennig | 7½ Pfennig | 7½ Pfennig |
| inland letter up to 20 g. | 10 Pfennig | 15 Pfennig | 15 Pfennig |
| inland postcard | 5 Pfennig | 7½ Pfennig | 10 Pfennig |
| inland printed matter up to 50 g. | 3 Pfennig | 3 Pfennig | 5 Pfennig |
| international letter up to 20 g. | 20 Pfennig | 20 Pfennig | 20 Pfennig |
| international postcard | 10 Pfennig | 10 Pfennig | 10 Pfennig |

Apart from Germany the Reichsabgabe also applied to the parts of Poland and the Russian Empire occupied by Germany and to the occupied Grand Duchy of Luxembourg, but not to the occupied part of Belgium.

The Reichsabgabe was ended on 1 October 1919 in conformance to a law of 8 September 1919. However, the raisings of the postal rates were not reversed.
