= Feldheim Collection =

British Library philatelic collection

The Feldheim Collection is a collection of philatelic material of Bavaria, Thurn and Taxis that forms part of the British Library Philatelic Collections. The collection was donated to the library on the death of Dr Heinz Feldheim in 1999.

== See also ==
- Postage stamps and postal history of Germany
- Thurn-und-Taxis-Post
