= Deutsche Bundespost =

Former state postal company of Germany

- Logo with post horn and stylized lightning, used from the early 1980s
- Formerly: Deutsche Post (1947–1950)
- Type: Sondervermögen des Bundes (state-owned enterprise, until 1995); Private (1995)
- Industry: Telephony; Information technology; Logistics
- Predecessors: Deutsche Reichspost; Deutsche Bundespost Berlin; Deutsche Post der DDR
- Founded: 1947; 79 years ago as Deutsche Post; 1950; 76 years ago as Deutsche Bundespost
- Defunct: 1 January 1995 (privatised)
- Successors: Deutsche Post AG; Deutsche Telekom AG; Deutsche Postbank AG
- Headquarters: Bonn, North Rhine-Westphalia, Germany
- Number of employees: ~544,000 (1985)
- Parent: Federal Ministry of Post and Telecommunications
- Website: No website

The Deutsche Bundespost (German pronunciation: [ˌdɔʏtʃə ˈbʊndəsˌpɔst], lit. 'German Federal Post') was a German state-run postal service and telecommunications business founded in 1947. It was initially the second largest federal employer during its time. After staff reductions in the 1980s, the staff was reduced to roughly 543,200 employees in 1985. The corporation was dissolved in 1995 under two rounds of postal reforms that took place in the German Post Office in 1989 and 1995, respectively. Following the reforms, the former Deutsche Bundespost was broken into three publicly traded corporations: Deutsche Post AG (postal services), Deutsche Telekom (telecommunications), and Deutsche Postbank AG (banking).

== History ==
Created in 1947 in the Trizone as a successor to the Deutsche Reichspost (German Imperial Post), until 1950 the enterprise was called Deutsche Post (German Post). Until 1989, the Deutsche Bundespost was a state-owned operation.

=== Organization ===
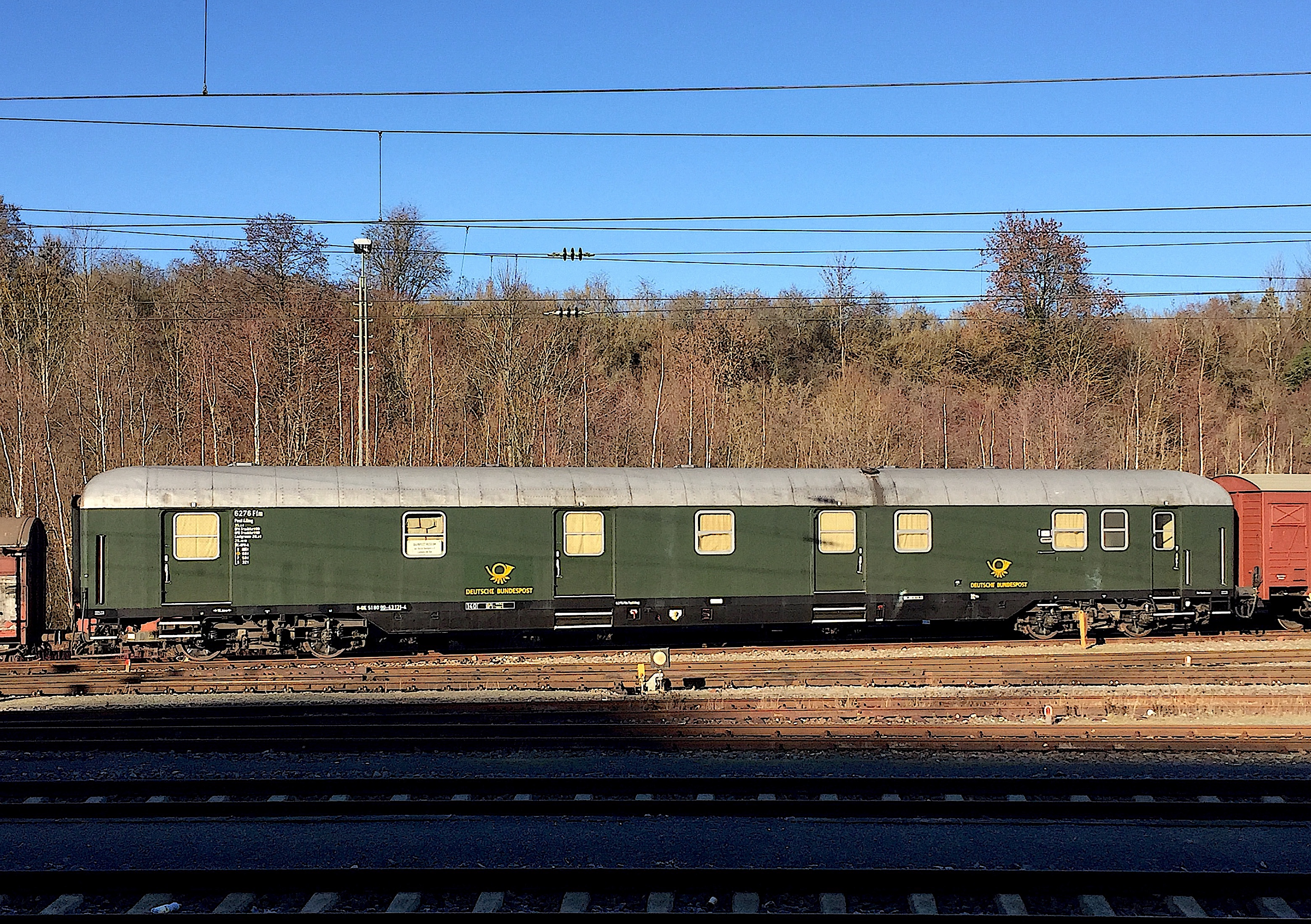
Postal railway wagon of Deutsche Bundespost in Rottweil

The Bundespost was developed according to a three-tier principle common in public administration in the Federal Republic of Germany. The upper stage consisted of the Federal Ministry of Post and Telecommunications. The middle stage consisted of regional directorates (Bundespostdirektionen) and the state post office management (Landespostdirektion) under western Allied authority in West Berlin (see Deutsche Bundespost Berlin) as of 1949/1955). The post office technical central office, telecommunication engineering central office, postal administration social office, and post offices) were on an equal level with the directorates. The lower stage consisted of post office branches, postal giro (akin to a checking account) savings bank offices and telecommunications office branches.

=== Legal basis ===
The legal basis for the administrative activity of the Bundespost was the postal administration act (Postverwaltungsgesetz, abbreviated PostVwG). A central goal of public administrative policy after 1924 was financial self-sufficiency. Political goals, however, often superseded this goal. According to the PostVwG, the federal postal system was to be administered "according to the principles of the policy of the FRG, in particular trade, economic, financial and social policies" and "the interests of the German national economy."

The Deutsche Bundespost was the largest employer in the Federal Republic, employing some 543,200 people as of 1985.

=== Reforms ===
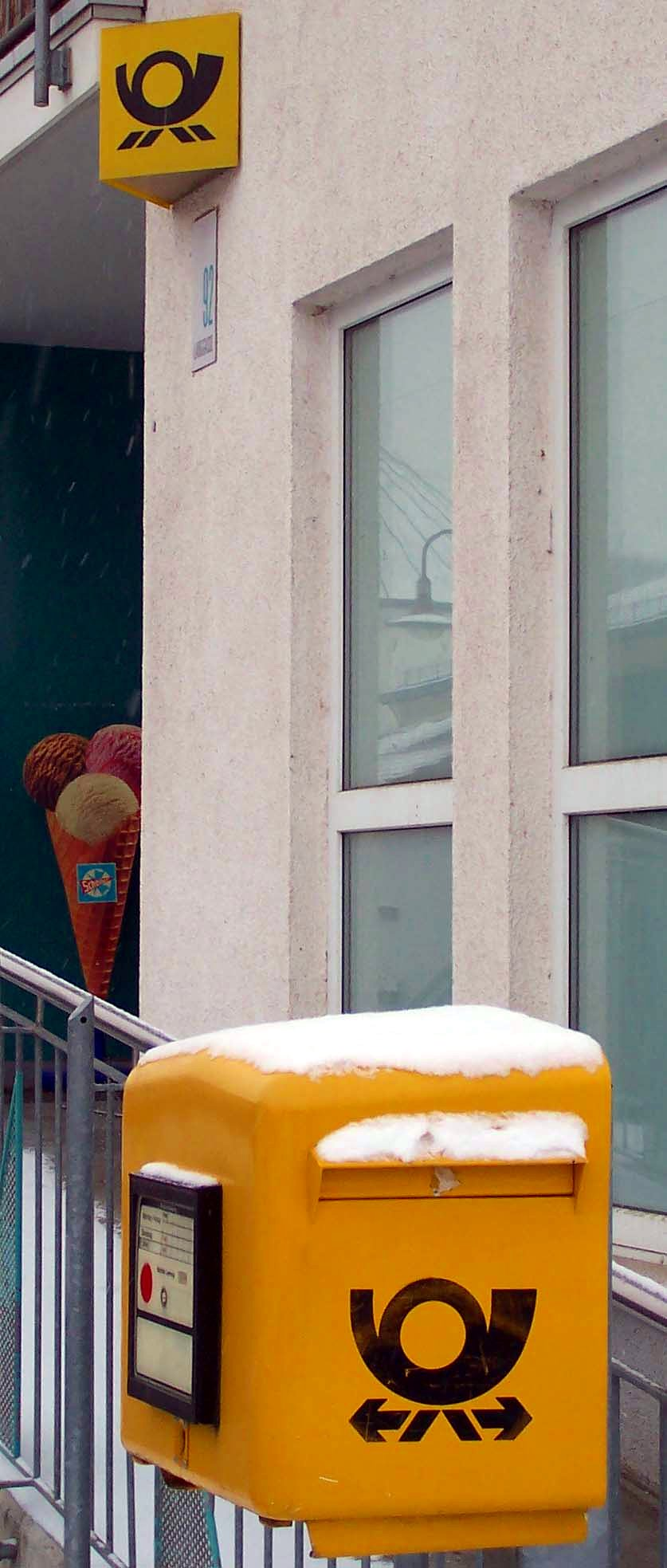
German letter box with an old post horn logo with flashes from the Deutsche Bundespost; above, the new stylised post horn logo from Deutsche Post AG

In the first post office reform implemented on 1 July 1989, the Bundespost was divided into three divisions (also called public enterprises):

- Deutsche Bundespost Postdienst – postal service
- Deutsche Bundespost Telekom – communications service
- Deutsche Bundespost Postbank – postal bank

The central authorities remained as described above. The divisions were privatized on 1 January 1995 in a second round of reforms, resulting in:

- Deutsche Post AG from the postal service
- Deutsche Telekom AG from the communications service
- Deutsche Postbank AG from the postal bank

The federal ministry for post office and telecommunications (Bundesministerium für Post und Telekommunikation) retained oversight responsibility for postal services and telecommunications. After the dissolution of that ministry on 1 January 1998, those tasks were taken over by a new federal network regulatory agency (Bundesnetzagentur, formerly RegTP) under the federal ministry for economics and technology. Other functions (such as the issuance of postage stamps) were taken over by the federal ministry of finance. Some telecommunications functions (including BOS radio) were turned over to the federal ministry of the interior.

For certain official and legal purposes (including certain financial, medical and other services for former postal civil servants), a "federal institution for post and telecommunication" (Bundesanstalt für Post und Telekommunikation) was created.

== See also ==
- Postal, telegraph and telephone service
- Postage stamps and postal history of Germany
- Deutsche Bundespost Berlin
- Deutsche Post of the GDR
- Pesthörnchen (CCC)
