= Deutsche Bundespost Berlin =

The Deutsche Bundespost Berlin (German Federal Post of Berlin) was the name used on the stamps of West Berlin. It sounds similar to the name of the Western German postal services Deutsche Bundespost and was de facto a dependency of it. De jure, it was independent and was called Landespostdirektion Berlin. The governmental agency to provide mail and telecommunication services for West Berlin. This civil service agency was in operation from 1949 until 1990.

== Historical background ==
With the end of World War II in 1945, the Allied Control Commission replaced the German government. Germany was divided into four occupation zones, and Berlin into four sectors; the territories east of the Oder-Neisse were placed under Polish authority. Initially Berlin and the provinces in the Soviet zone issued their own stamps (see Scott # 11N2), but by 1946 "Deutsche Post" stamps were authorized that were valid in the American, British, and Soviet zones.

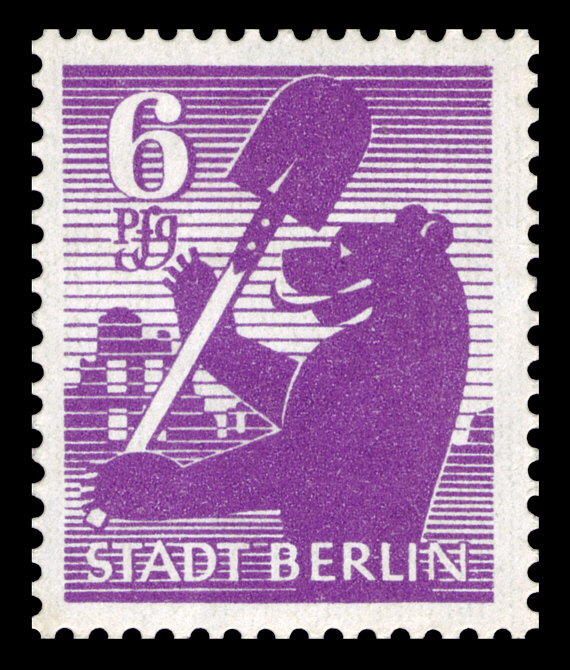
Russian occupation stamp for Berlin, 1945, Scott 11N2

When the negotiations about a general German currency reform broke down, the western zones proceeded with the currency reform, and on June 21, 1948, the Deutsche Mark was introduced. In response, the east German currency reform was set for June 24, 1948, the East German Mark became the currency for the Soviet occupation zone and East Berlin, and its stamps were marked with overprints. This established the economic separation of the two German states. In July 1948, the stamps of the previously common issue were overprinted with "Soviet Occupation Zone" and subsequently the Soviet zone issued different stamps than the western zone, all, however, under the "Deutsche Post" label. West Berlin now started to issue its own stamps on September 3, 1948, initially "Berlin" overprinted common stamps of the "Deutsche Post". The Deutsche Mark (West) became the sole currency for West Berlin on March 21, 1949, and seven months later the stamps of the western bizone as well as the French occupation zone became valid as well.

The Federal Republic of Germany was founded on May 23, 1949, and shortly thereafter, the formation of the German Democratic Republic took place on October 7, 1949. In each republic the "Deutsche Post" now became the government agency to maintain postal and telecommunication services, in West Germany the "Deutsche Post" was renamed "Deutsche Bundespost" in 1950, and in East Germany the term DP (of the GDR) was kept.

West Berlin retained its special status as it remained under the authority of the American, British, and French occupation forces. Thus it continued to issue its own stamps, these stamps became also valid in West Germany on January 1, 1950.

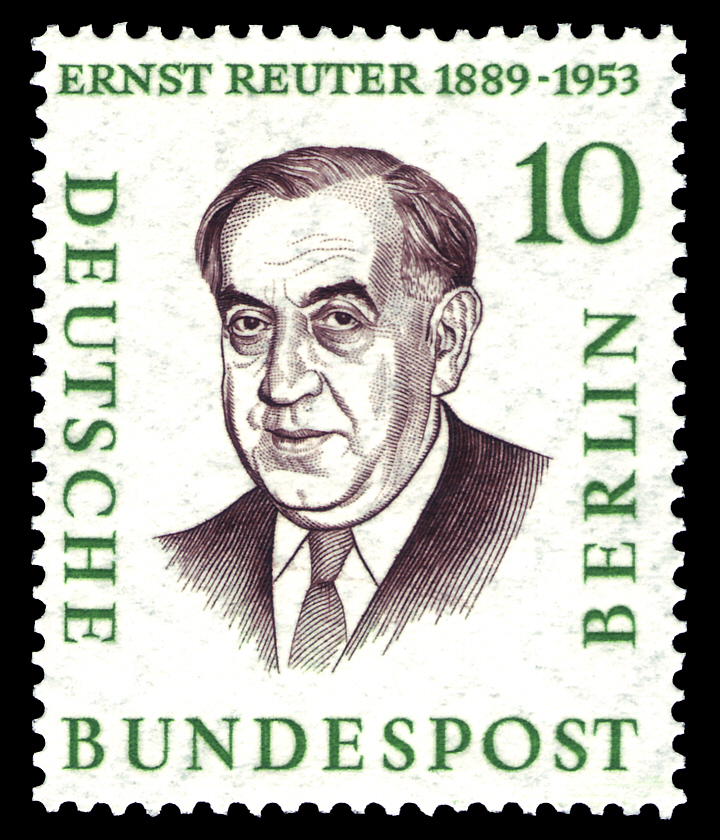
Ernst Reuter, mayor of West Berlin, Scott #9N150

== Activity ==
The first stamps were issued as "Deutsche Post", in 1952 the inscription was changed to "Deutsche Post Berlin", and three years later to "Deutsche Bundespost Berlin". Many stamps had the same appearance as the stamps of the Federal Republic of Germany with just the inscription changed, while others were distinctly different.

According to the Scott catalogue, during its 41 years the DBP Berlin issued close to 900 stamps, namely 592 different stamps including many commemoratives, plus 285 semi-postal designs; there are no airmail stamps or official stamps. Topics of commemoratives and semipostals include common topicals (i.e. nature, sports, arts), science and technical issues and historical stamps. Additional stamps of the DP consisted of official stamps (44 types). All stamps were issued in West Deutsche Mark and were valid in Western Germany too. The last stamp was issued on September 27, 1990 (Mi #879).

With the 1990 reunification, the DBP Berlin became part of the Deutsche Bundespost which in turn was five years later converted into the Deutsche Post AG. In this process its stamps (starting with Mi # 326) became valid for all over Germany until December 31, 1991.

== Sources ==
- Michel catalog (1997). Michel Deutschland-Spezial-Katalog 1997. Munich: Schwaneberger Verlag GMBH. ISBN 3-87858-130-0.
- Scott catalog (2006). Scott 2006 Standard Postage Stamp Catalogue, Volume3. Sidney, Ohio: Scott Publishing Co. ISBN 0-89487-353-9.

== See also ==
- Postage stamps and postal history of Germany
- Michel catalog
- Scott catalog
