= Reichspost =

German state postal service, 1871 to 1945

Reichspost (German: [ˈʁaɪçsˌpɔst]; "Imperial Mail") was the name of the postal service of Germany from 1871 to 1945.

== Deutsche Reichspost ==
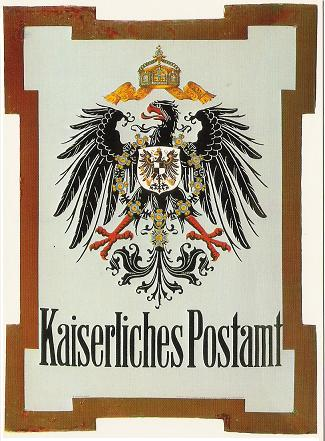
Kaiserliches Postamt sign, c. 1900

Upon the outbreak of the Austro-Prussian War of 1866 and the break-up of the German Confederation in the Peace of Prague, the North German Confederation was established, instigated by the Prussian minister-president Otto von Bismarck. Originally a military alliance, it evolved to a federation with the issuing of a constitution with effect from 1st July 1867. In the course of the war, Prussian troops had occupied the Free City of Frankfurt and the King of Prussia (later to become the German Kaiser, or Emperor) had purchased the remnants of the Thurn-und-Taxis Post organisation. According to article 48, the federal area of the Northern German states, de facto an enlarged Prussia, came under the united postal authority, led by director Heinrich von Stephan.

With the German unification upon the Franco-Prussian War of 1870–1871, the Deutsche Reichspost was established as a state monopoly and became the official national postal authority of the German Empire including the annexed territory of Alsace-Lorraine. Its official name was Kaiserliche Post und Telegraphenverwaltung. The Southern German federated states of Baden (until 1872), Württemberg (until 1902) and Bavaria initially maintained separate state post authorities, that nevertheless were integrated into the nationwide administration. On 1st January 1876 a Reichspostamt under Postmaster General von Stephan was split-off from Bismarck's Reich Chancellery as a government agency in its own right. In the First World War, a Reichsabgabe tax was levied on the postal traffic from 1st August 1916 in order to finance the war expenses.

Deutsche Reichspost logo, 1925

With the establishment of the Weimar Republic upon the German Revolution of 1918–1919, the former Reichspostamt in Berlin became the Reichspostministerium. After the period of hyperinflation, the Deutsche Reichspost (DRP) agency was again spun off in 1924 and operated as a state-owned enterprise. On 2nd June 1932, Paul Freiherr von Eltz-Rübenach was appointed Reichspost Minister by Chancellor Franz von Papen and he maintained his office upon the Machtergreifung of the Nazi Party in 1933, "assisted" by Nazi State Secretary Wilhelm Ohnesorge. The postal area was significantly enlarged with the incorporation of the Saar territory in 1935, the Austrian Anschluss in 1938, and the annexation of the Sudetenland according to the Munich Agreement. It was during this time that the Reichspost installed the first public videophone.

In the Second World War the Reichspost authority spread out to the Polish areas annexed by Nazi Germany, such as the Reichsgau Wartheland, the Reichsgau Danzig-Westpreußen, and the Polish General Government. In 1941 postal codes were introduced. The Feldpost military mail organisation of the Wehrmacht not only served Army, Luftwaffe and Kriegsmarine service members, but also SS-Verfügungstruppen, Waffen-SS and Reichsarbeitsdienst members in the field, becoming the general postal authority of the occupied territories. Deliveries were more and more affected by the advance of Allied troops from January 1945 onward. The Reichspost finally ceased to function with the German Instrument of Surrender on 8th May. The last Reichspostminister Julius Dorpmüller, a member of the Flensburg Government, was arrested two weeks later, and governmental authority was officially taken over by the Allied Control Council with the Berlin Declaration of 5th June.

== Successors ==
The Reichspost was initially replaced by Allied-controlled postal authorities that provided mail services in the occupation zones. From 1947, a united agency served the British-American Bizone area. With the emergence of two German states, the Deutsche Bundespost (German Federal Post) was established in West Germany, and the Deutsche Post in East Germany. In addition, there was a separate Deutsche Bundespost Berlin for West Berlin, as well as the Saar postal authority (1947–1956).

After the reunification of Germany in 1990, the state-owned Bundespost continued to function as the sole provider of postal services until 1995, when the postal, telecommunications, and banking divisions were spun off as separate entities. The Deutsche Bundespost eventually became Deutsche Post AG, a share holding company, later reintegrating the Postbank, and Deutsche Telekom.

== Other use ==
- Between 1894 and 1938, a daily newspaper called Reichspost was issued in Vienna, Austria.
- During the Second World War there was an additional use for the postal vans: "01.05.1942 Transfer of Postschutz in the SS (see Gottlob Berger), shortly after that also the 'remote power mail' ('front help of the Deutsche Reichspost') used as 'SS power driving season'. During 1942, these buses were used for transporting psychiatric patients to the gasification facilities of [the] T-4 euthanasia program."

== See also ==
- Deutsche Bundespost
- Deutsche Post
- Postage stamps and postal history of Germany
- Postschutz
- Old Post House, Wimbern
- Former Kiautschou Imperial Post Office
