= Postage stamps and postal history of Germany =

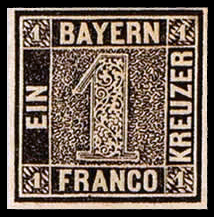
Bavaria Scott #1, the first German stamp, 1849

This is a survey of the postage stamps and postal history of Germany and philatelically related areas. The main modern providers of service were the Reichspost (1871–1945), the Deutsche Post under Allied control (1945–1949), the Deutsche Post of the GDR (1949–1990), the Deutsche Bundespost (1949–1995), along with the Deutsche Bundespost Berlin (1949–1990), and are now the Deutsche Post AG (since 1995).

== Metzger Post ==
The Metzger Post is credited to be perhaps the first international post of the Middle Ages. The guild of butchers (German: Metzger) organized courier mail services with horses; when the mail arrived they used a horn to announce it and thus created a commonly recognized emblem for postal services. The Metzger Post was established in the twelfth century and survived until 1637, when Thurn und Taxis's monopoly took over.

== Thurn und Taxis ==
In 1497, on behalf of Emperor Maximilian I of the Holy Roman Empire, Franz von Taxis established a postal service that replaced the ad hoc courier for official mail. A horse relay system was created that shortened the transit time for mail and made its arrival predictable. Thereafter, the house of Thurn und Taxis using the imperial yellow and black livery maintained the postal privilege for many centuries. The Thurn-und-Taxis Post employed the first horse-drawn mail coaches in Europe since Roman times (in 1650). They started in the town of Kocs, giving rise to the term "coach".

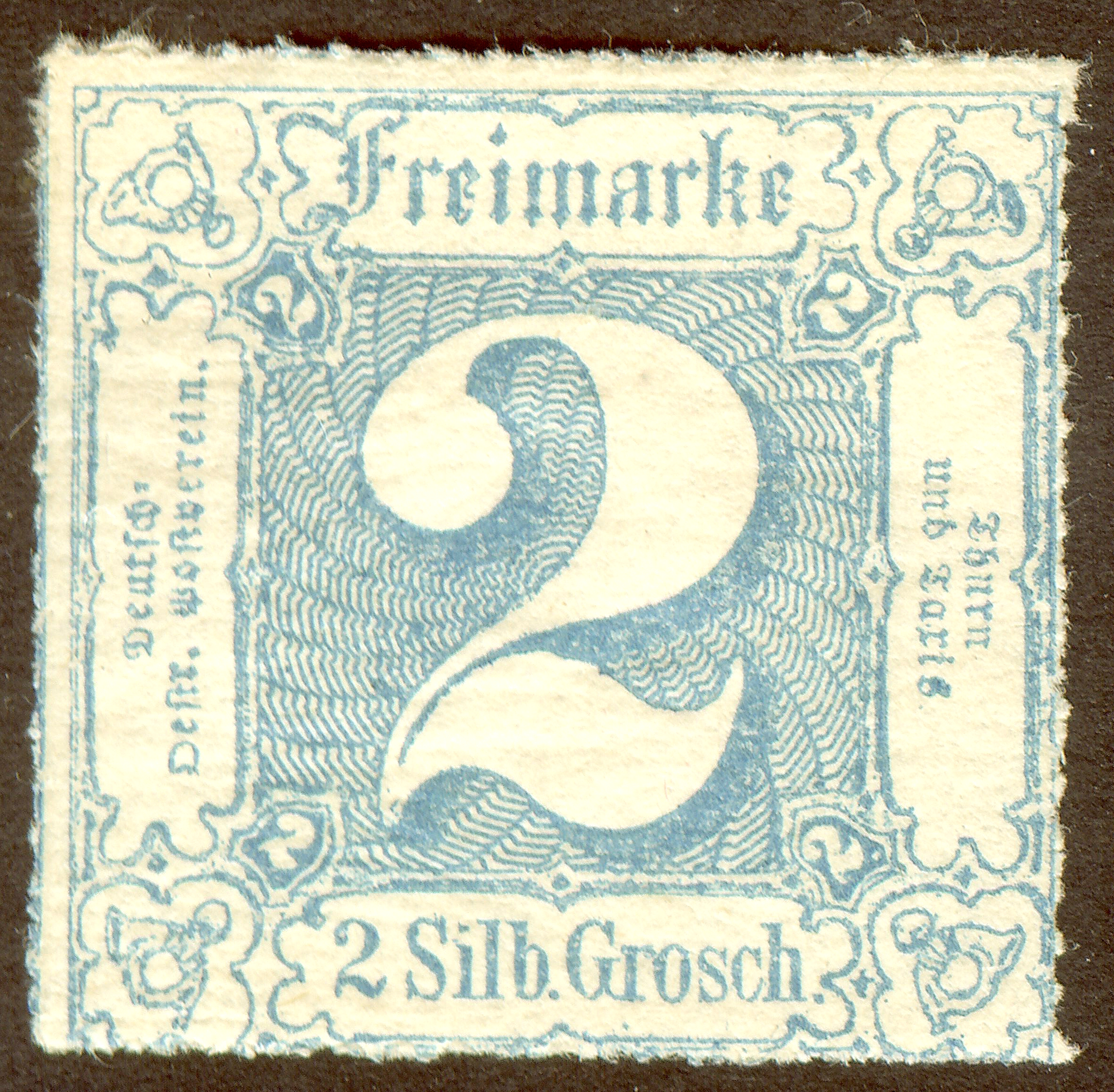
Thurn und Taxis stamp, Northern District, 1865

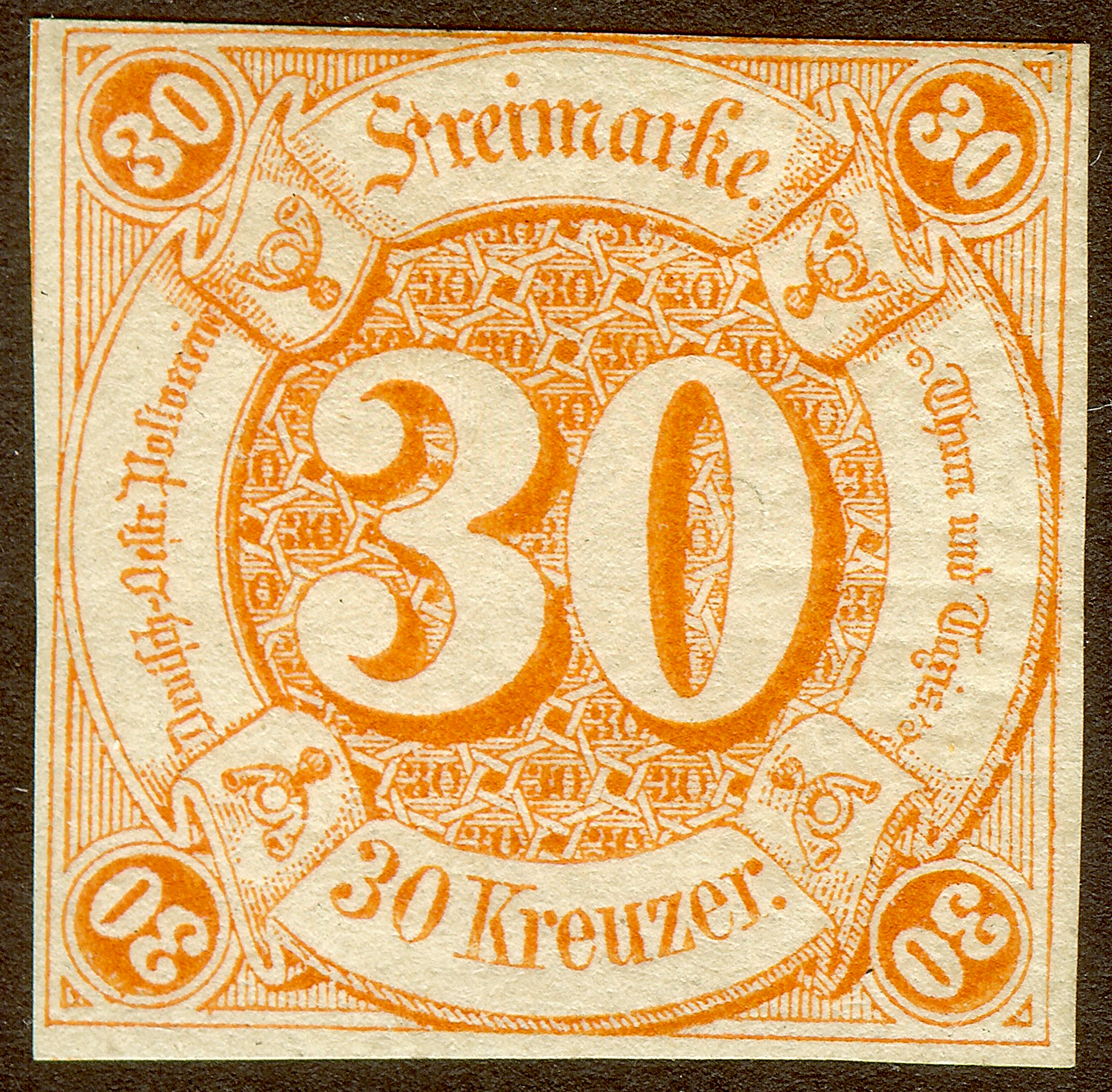
Thurn und Taxis stamp, Southern District, 1859

Thurn und Taxis lost its monopoly when Napoleon granted the Rhine Confederation the right to conduct postal services. The agency continued to operate and even issued some stamps (v.i.) but when Prussia created the North German Confederation, Thurn und Taxis had to sell its privileges in 1867.

== German states ==
Prior to the German unification of 1871, individual German states and entities started to release their own stamps, Bavaria first on November 1, 1849, with the one kreuzer black. States or entities that issued stamps subsequently were Baden (1851), Bergedorf (1861), Brunswick (1852), Bremen (1855), Hamburg (1859), Hanover (1850), Heligoland (1867), Lübeck (1859), Mecklenburg-Schwerin (1856), Mecklenburg-Strelitz (1864), Oldenburg (1852), Prussia (1850), Saxony (1850), Schleswig-Holstein (1850), and Württemberg (1851). Also, Thurn und Taxis, while not a state, had the authority to issue stamps and transport mail and released stamps (1852). The northern German states joined in the North German Confederation in 1868 and united their postal services in the "North German Postal District" (Norddeutscher Postbezirk). After the unification, Bavaria and Württemberg retained their postal authority to continue producing stamps until March 31, 1920.

== Imperial Germany, 1871–1918 ==
=== Reichspost ===
The Deutsche Reichspost started officially on May 4, 1871, using initially stamps of the North German Confederation until it issued its first stamps on January 1, 1872. Heinrich von Stephan, inventor of the postcard and founder of the Universal Postal Union, was the first Postmaster-General. The most common stamps of the Reichspost were the Germania stamps. Germania stamps were issued from 1900 until 1922 making it the longest running series in German philately with the change in the inscription from Reichspost to Deutsches Reich being the major modification during this period.

=== German colonies ===
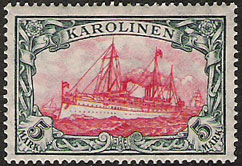
Caroline Islands, Mi #19

Early postage from about 1887 or 1888 consisted of common contemporary German stamps and is only recognized by the post office cancellation stamp as having been used in a colony. Such stamps are known as "Vorläufer" (forerunner) stamps. In the next step regular stamps were used with overprints indicating the name of the territory. Generally by 1896 and thereafter overprinted stamps were issued by the German authorities for all colonies: German South-West Africa, German New Guinea, Kiautschou, Togo, Samoa, Marshall Islands, Mariana Islands, Caroline Islands, German East Africa and Kamerun. By about 1900 the yacht issue was introduced for the various colonial territories which had a uniform appearance depicting the imperial yacht SMY Hohenzollern. After Germany lost control of its colonies in the course of World War I, overprinted yacht stamps were temporarily used by the new colonial rulers.

=== German offices abroad ===
Imperial Germany maintained post offices in certain towns in Morocco, Turkey, and China. Issued stamps can be recognized by the cancellation stamp or the overprint may show local denomination and the name of the country.

=== German World War I occupations ===
During World War I, German authorities issued stamps in occupied countries, namely Belgium, Poland, Romania, and areas of the western and eastern front.

== Weimar Republic, 1918–1933 ==
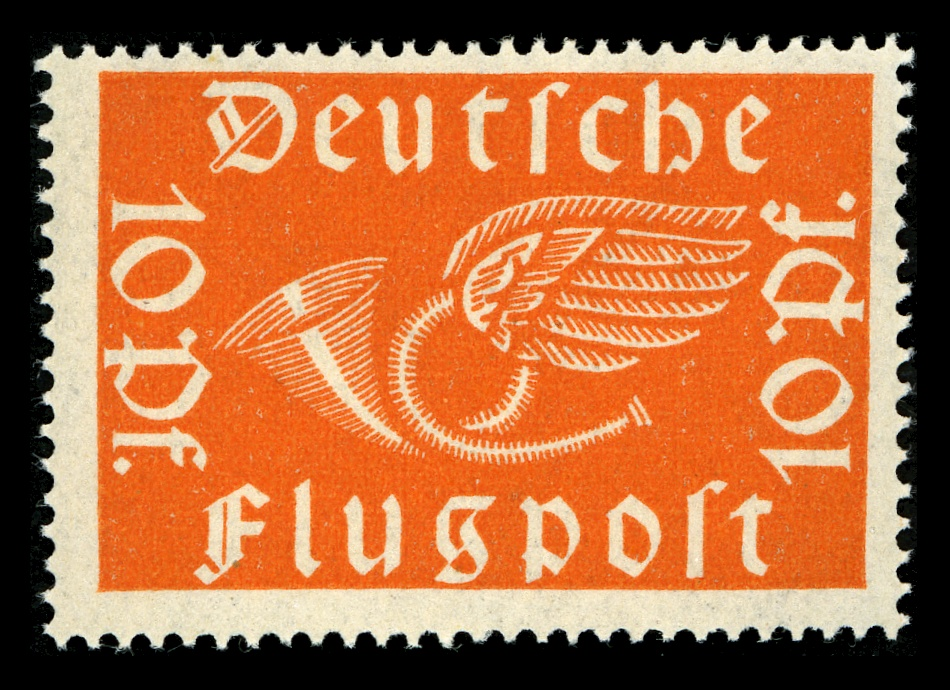
Scott #C1 from 1919 – the first air mail stamp

=== Reichspost ===
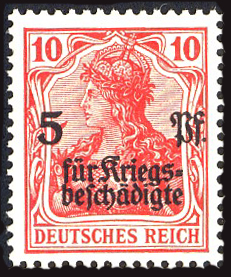
Scott #B1 from 1919 – the first semipostal stamp

The Reichspost continued to function as a governmental entity after Germany became a republic. In 1919 the Reichspost issued its first commemorative, airmail, and semipostal stamps. The first semipostal stamp in 1919 carried a surcharge for the benefit of victims of war (Scott #B1). In 1923 during hyperinflation, the Reichspost issued stamps up to 50 billion marks. The main common stamp series then was the "famous German people" series, followed by the Hindenburg stamps. The first of the valuable German Zeppelin stamps appeared in 1928, Scott #C35–37.

=== Plebiscite areas ===
After the Treaty of Versailles a number of areas underwent plebiscites in 1920 to determine their future fate. These areas briefly issued stamps: Allenstein and Marienwerder, Schleswig, and Upper Silesia.

=== Danzig ===
After the Treaty of Versailles the Free City of Danzig was established as an independent entity in 1920. At first German stamps were still used, after a while overprinted with "Danzig". Thereafter Danzig introduced its own stamps until 1939. In addition, the Polish Post maintained a presence in Danzig and issued Port Gdansk overprinted Polish stamps.

=== Memel territory ===
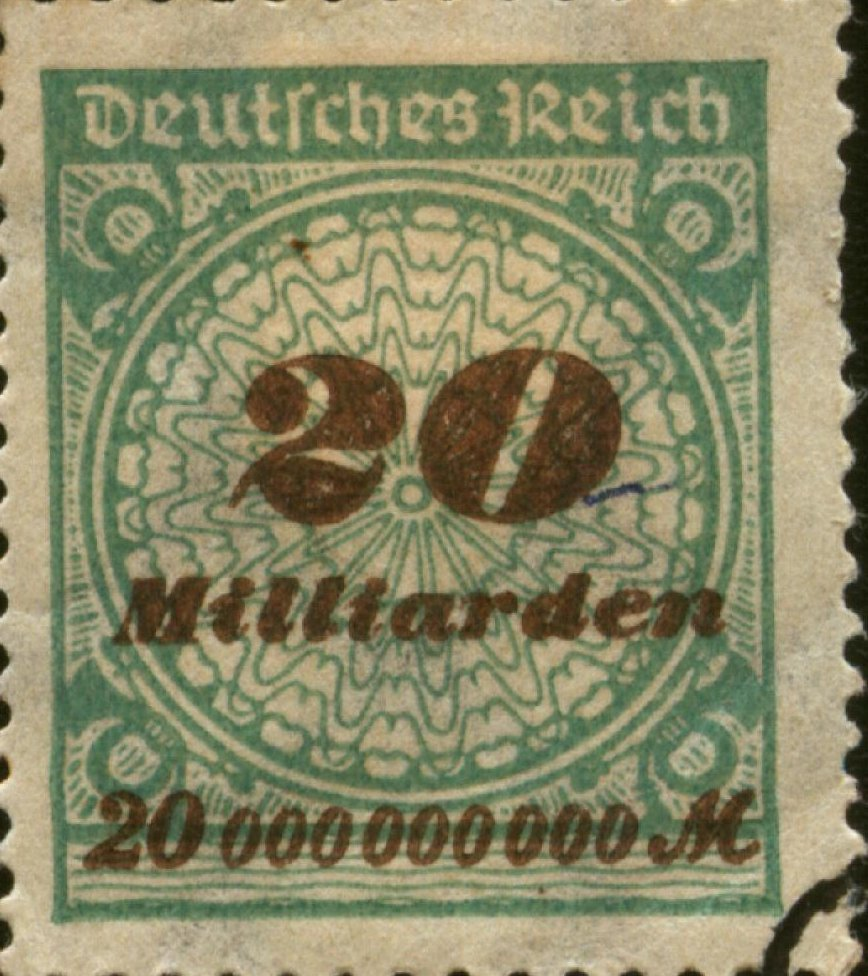
Hyperinflation stamp, 1923 (Scott #298)

After the Treaty of Versailles, the Memel Territory (Memelland, Klaipėda) was established. Initially German then French and Lithuanian overprinted stamps were used. Memel issued stamps between 1920 and 1923 when it was annexed by Lithuania.

=== Saar ===
After the Treaty of Versailles the Saar territory was administered by the League of Nations. It issued its own stamps from 1920 to 1935 when it returned to Germany after a plebiscite. The first stamps were overprinted German and Bavarian stamps.

== Nazi Germany, 1933–1945 ==
=== Reichspost ===
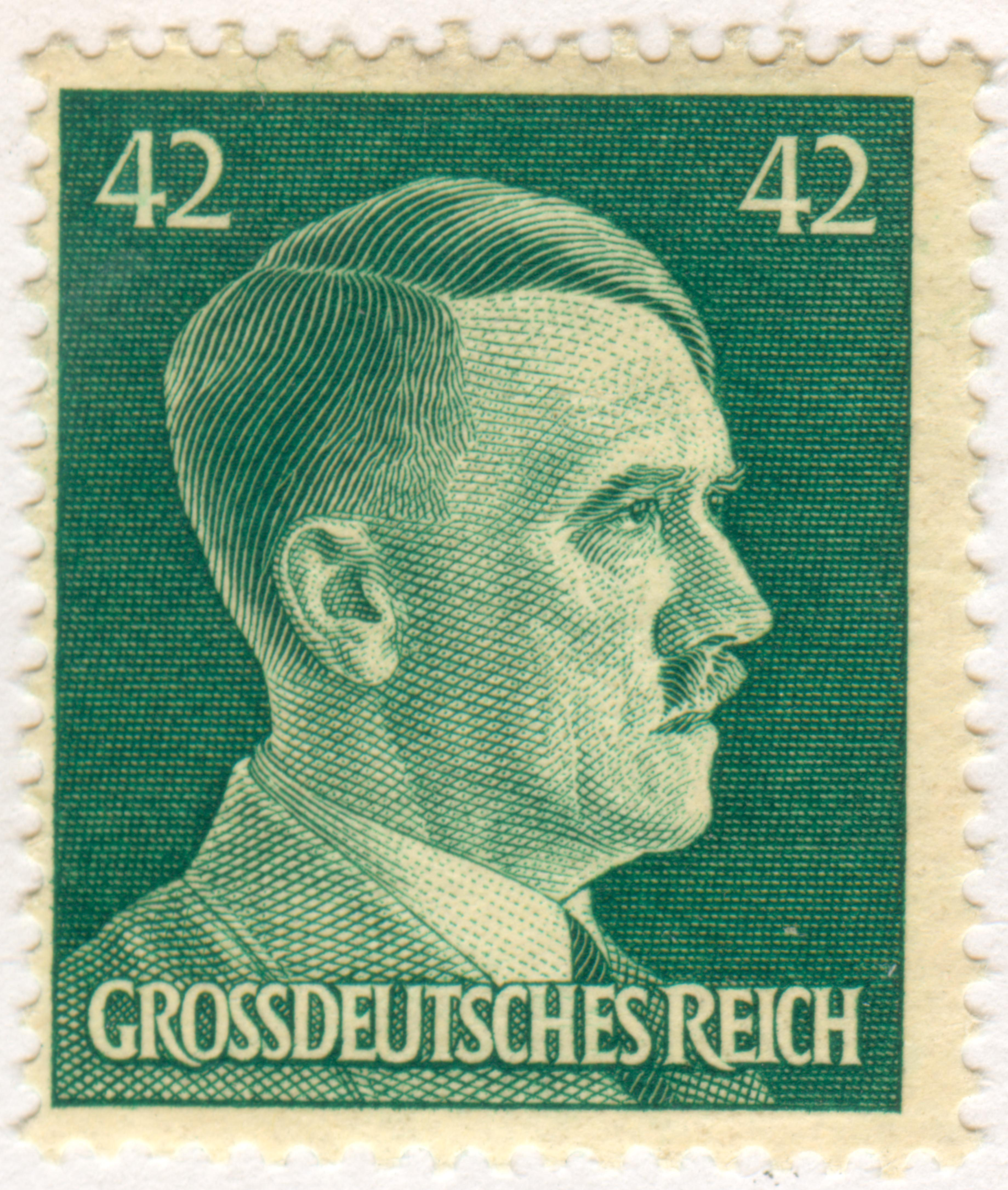
Stamp of Nazi Germany: Chancellor and Führer of the Greater German Reich, Adolf Hitler (1944)

In Nazi Germany, the Reichspost continued to function as a monopoly of the government under the auspices of the Reichspostministerium, and Nazi propaganda took hold and influenced stamp design and policy. The Hitler head stamp became the stamp for common usage, and a large number of semipostal stamps were issued. In the last year before the end of the war the stamp inscription "Deutsches Reich" was changed to "Grossdeutsches Reich" (Greater German Empire). Field post stamps were issued for the military forces starting in 1942. The world's first postal code system was introduced on July 25, 1941, with a two-digit number system. This system was initially used for the packet service and later applied to all mail deliveries.

=== Sudetenland/Bohemia and Moravia ===
After the Munich Agreement the Sudetenland became German territory in 1938 and initially, Czechoslovak stamps were used locally with an overprint, before German stamps became available. After the 1939 occupation of Czechoslovakia, Czechoslovak stamps were initially overprinted before new designs were issued by Bohemia and Moravia. These new stamps were issued until 1945.

=== German World War II occupations ===
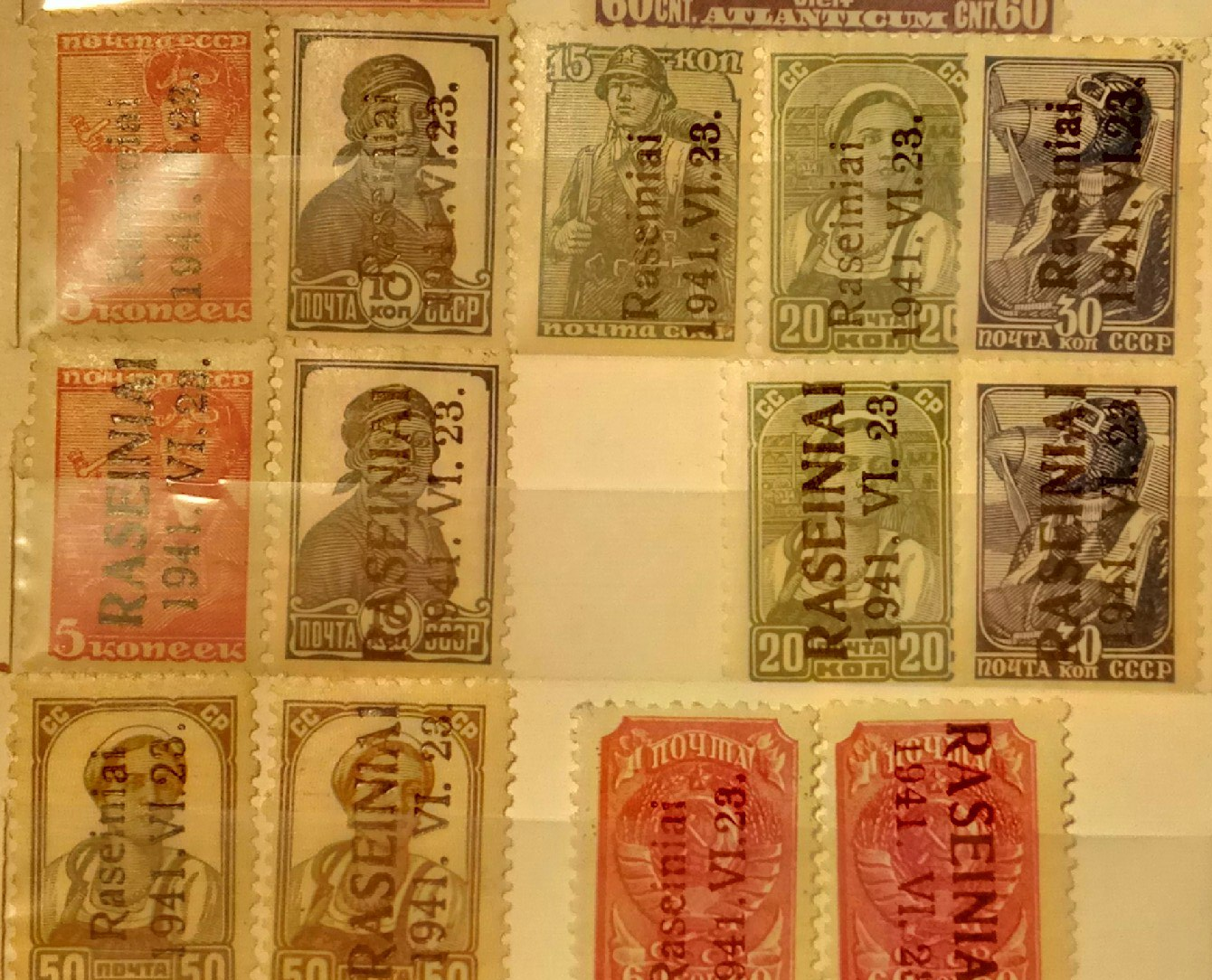
German overstamp on the postage of USSR, with the date of Battle of Raseiniai

During the course of World War II German authorities issued stamps in Albania, Alsace, Belgium, Channel Islands, Estland, parts of France, Kotor, Kurland, Latvia, Lithuania, Luxembourg, Macedonia, Montenegro, Poland (General Government), parts of Russia, Serbia, Slovenia, Ukraine, Zante, and Zara.

== Divided Germany, 1945–1990 ==
=== Local issues ===
In the process of the collapse of Nazi Germany, mail services became disrupted or ceased. Various communities established services locally during the void often using defaced Hitler stamps.

=== Allied occupation ===
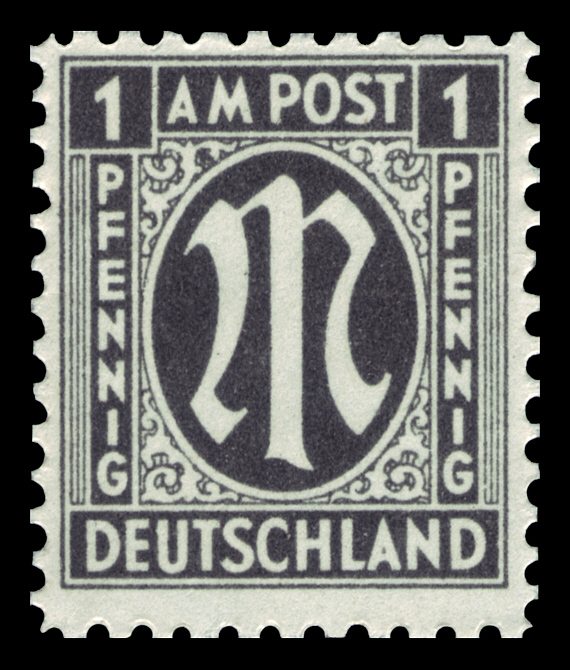
AM Post stamp 1945

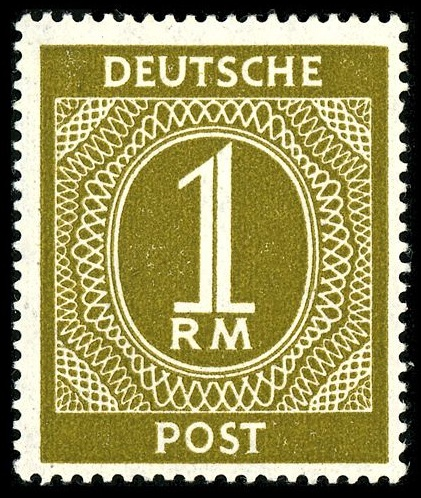
Common issue 1946, Scott #556

After Germany surrendered from the war, it was divided into four areas, Russian, American, French, and British. Between 1945–1949 was considered to be an interesting period in time as it was complicated to determine how many stamps were issued throughout this time and they were appearing in different areas. With the occupation of Germany by the Allied powers postal services returned but were administered under different authorities. AM Post stamps were provided by the American and British occupation services during 1945 as the first step to restore mail service in their jurisdictions. By December 1945, the French authorities issued stamps for the "zone française", later to be supplemented by stamps for Baden, Rheinland-Pfalz, and Württemberg. In addition, separate stamps were provided for the Saar. In the Soviet zone, from 1945, the various provinces – namely, Berlin-Brandenburg, Mecklenburg-Vorpommern, Saxony (Ost Sachsen, West Sachsen, Provinz Sachsen), and Thuringia – issued different stamps. In 1946, German stamps were issued as Deutsche Post for the American, British, and Soviet zones but not the French zone. The distinctive use of yellow to signify postal service was decreed by the Allied Control Council in 1946. With the development of the Cold War, however, attempts to unify the postal system failed. By 1948, even before the establishment of the two German republics, the common stamps had been replaced by definitives for the Soviet zone, and different sets of stamps for the bizone.

=== Saar ===
After World War II, the Saar territory came under French administration and issued its own stamps from 1947 to 1956. Following a referendum it was returned to Germany in 1956, and continued its stamps series until 1959.

=== Deutsche Bundespost Berlin ===
West Berlin, under the jurisdiction of the three western powers, started to release its own stamps on September 3, 1948. It continued to issue stamps under the Deutsche Bundespost Berlin label for 42 years, a total of over 800 different stamps, until the reunification in 1990. Many West Berlin stamps were similar to the stamps of West Germany. West Berlin and West German stamps could be used in either jurisdiction.

=== Deutsche Post of the GDR ===
With the formation of the German Democratic Republic (GDR) the Deutsche Post of the GDR service was established as the governmental agency to provide mail services. Its first stamp was released on October 9, 1949. About 3,000 different stamps were produced during the life of the existence of the DP; relatively low, however, was the number of semipostals. Stamps were to some degree used to gain currency abroad, that is some stamps were not produced for circulation but sold directly to stamp dealers. Also, for some sets a specific stamp was produced at an intentionally low number – called a Sperrwert ('blocked stamp value', or 'stamp with limited release') – to artificially increase the value and sell it for more money to stamp dealers. With the 1990 reunification, the Deutsche Post became part of the Deutsche Bundespost.

=== Deutsche Bundespost ===
When the Federal Republic of Germany was formed the Deutsche Bundespost (German federal post office) became the governmental agency with the monopoly for postal services; the name was adopted in 1950, prior to that year, it was called Deutsche Post. The issue of the FRG was released on September 7, 1949 (Scott #665–666). In 1961, the two-digit postal code was replaced with a four-digit code; this was replaced after reunification. By the time of reunification, about 1,400 different stamps had been issued. The process of converting the governmental agency into a public company was initiated in 1989 by separating postal services from post bank and communication services.

== After reunification, 1990–present ==
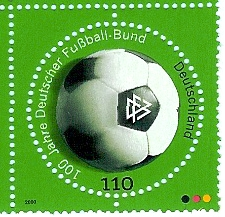
Soccer stamp of the Deutsche Post, 2000, Scott #2063

=== Deutsche Post AG ===
With German reunification, the Bundespost with the incorporated Deutsche Post of the GDR provided postal services for the whole territory of the Federal Republic, and German stamps regardless of origin were postally valid until their date of expiration: for the stamps of the GDR Mi # 1004–3343, this was October 1, 1990, and for GDR Mi 3344-3365 December 12, 1991; the latter was the same date for the expiration of the West Berlin stamps Mi #326–879. By 1993, a new five-digit postal code had been introduced. In 1995, the Bundespost was converted into a stock company – the Deutsche Post AG – the shares of which became available in 2000. The company with its subsidiaries operates in logistics on a global scale.
Although the postal service was privatized, the stamps are still printed and provided by the German government.

== Statistics ==
According to the Scott catalogue, the following number of different stamps (regular and semi-postal) were issued by the Reichspost (1871–1945), Deutsche Post (GDR) (1949–1990), Deutsche Bundespost Berlin (1949–1990), and Deutsche Bundespost (1949–1990):

Postal Authority	Regular stamps issued	Semi-postal stamps issued	Total
Reichspost	556	293	849
Deutsche Post (GDR)	2,805	191	2,996
Deutsche Bundespost Berlin	592	285	877
Deutsche Bundespost	955	395	1,350
Total	4,908	1,164	6,072

== See also ==
- Feldheim Collection
- List of people on stamps of the German Democratic Republic

== References and sources ==
Notes

Sources

- Mackay, James (1988). The Guinness Book of Stamps. Facts and Feats. Enfield, England: Guinness Publishing Ltd. ISBN 0-85112-351-1.
- Michel Deutschland-Spezial-Katalog 1997. Munich: Schwaneberger Verlag GmbH. 1997. ISBN 3-87858-130-0.
- Scott 2006 Standard Postage Stamp Catalogue, Volume 3. Sidney, Ohio: Scott Publishing Co. 2006. ISBN 0-89487-353-9.
