= Association of American Schools in South America =

Non-profit organization

The Association of American Schools in South America (AASSA) is a non-profit, 501(c)(3) organization established in 1961. According to the organization, its mission is "to discover and develop ways and means for improving understanding through international education." Member schools are private, college preparatory institutions offering a predominantly American curriculum taught in English. Full member schools must meet accreditation standards set by the AASSA board.

Currently, they have 50 full members and 33 invitational members.

== Full member schools ==
=== Argentina ===
- Asociación Escuelas Lincoln

=== Bolivia ===
- The American International School of Bolivia

=== Brazil ===
- American School of Belo Horizonte
- American School of Brasília
- American School of Recife
- American School of Rio de Janeiro
- Associacao Escola do Futuro
- Associacao Escola Guaduada de Sao Paulo
- Chapel School-Escola Maria Imaculada
- Escola Americana de Campinas
- International School of Curitiba
- Our Lady of Mercy School, Rio de Janeiro
- Pan American Christian Academy
- Pan American School of Bahia
- Pan American School of Porto Alegre
- Rio International School
- School of the Nations (Brasília)

=== Cayman Islands ===
- Cayman International School

=== Chile ===
- International School Nido de Aguilas

=== Colombia ===
- Colegio Albania (Albania School)
- Colegio Karl C. Parrish
- Colegio Nueva Granada
- Colegio Jorge Washington (also The George Washington School)
- Colombus School
- Colegio Granadino
- Colegio Bolivar
- Knightsbridge Schools International Bogotá (Bogotá)

=== Curacao ===
- International School of Curacao

=== Ecuador ===
- Academia Cotopaxi
- Alliance Academy International
- American School of Quito
- Colegio Alberto Einstein
- Colegio Menor de San Francisco (Quito & Samborondon Campuses)
- Inter-American Academy of Guayaquil

=== El Salvador ===
- Escuela Americana El Salvador

=== Guatemala ===
- American School of Guatemala

=== Guyana ===
- Georgetown International Academy

=== Honduras ===
- Alison Bixby Stone School
- American School of Tegucigalpa

=== Jamaica ===
- American International School of Kingston

=== Panama ===
- Crossroads Christian Academy
- Magen David Academy

=== Paraguay ===
- American School of Asuncion

=== Peru ===
- Colegio Franklin D. Roosevelt

=== Trinidad and Tobago ===
- International School Port of Spain

=== Uruguay ===
- Uruguayan American School

=== Venezuela ===
- Centro Educativo Internacional Anzoategui
- Colegio Internacional de Carabobo
- Colegio Internacional de Caracas
- Colegio Internacional Puerto La Cruz
- Escuela Bella Vista
- Escuela Campo Alegre
- Escuela Las Morochas
- International School of Monagas
- The British School Caracas

== Invitational member schools ==
=== Bolivia ===
- American Cooperative School
- Santa Cruz Cooperative School

=== Brazil ===
- Avenues Sao Paulo Fuducacao Ltda.
- Escola Beit Yaacov
- Escola Pueri Domus/global Education
- Sant'Anna American International School

=== Colombia ===
- Asociacion Colegio Granadino
- Colegio Albania
- Colegio Bilingue Richmond
- Colegio Bolivar
- Colegio Bureche
- Colegio Jorge Washington
- Colegio Panamericano
- GI School
- La Sierra International School
- The Victoria School

=== Costa Rica ===
- Kabe International Academy
- Lincoln School

=== Cuba ===
- International School of Havana

=== Dominican Republic ===
- Carol Morgan School

=== Ecuador ===
- ISM International Academy

=== El Salvador ===
- Escuela Americana El Salvador

=== Guatemala ===
- Colegio Interamericano de Guatemala
- Colegio Maya

=== Haiti ===
- Union School

=== Honduras ===
- Escuela Internacional Sampedrana

=== Mexico ===
- American School Foundation of Monterrey
- Colegio Atid
- Peterson Schools
- The American School Foundation
- The American School Foundation of Guadalajara A.C.
- Westhill Institute SC

=== Panama ===
- The International School of Panama
- The Metropolitan School of Panama
