= Venezuelan Association of North American Schools =

International High School conference in Venezuela

Venezuelan Association of North American Schools (VANAS) is an international high schools athletics conference in Venezuela.

== Participating teams ==
- CIC (Colegio Internacional de Caracas)
- CIC (Colegio Internacional de Carabobo)
- CIPLC (Colegio Internacional de Puerto La Cruz)
- ECA (Escuela Campo Alegre)
- EBV (Escuela Bella Vista) (Wins the most yearly tournaments)
- ISM (International School of Monagas)
- CELM (Centro Educativo Las Morochas)
- CEIA (Centro Educativo Internacional Anzoátegui)

== Sports Played ==
- Volleyball
- Basketball
- Soccer
- Softball
