= Confederate settlements in British Honduras =

Belizean cultural and ethnic sub-group

The Confederate Settlements in British Honduras are a cultural and ethnic sub-group in Belize, formerly known as the colony of British Honduras. They are the descendants of Confederates who fled to British Honduras with their families during and after the American Civil War.

As the American Civil War erupted, British colonial leaders saw an opportunity to profit from the sale of arms and weapons to the Confederate States. Soon a profitable trade in arms to Americans boosted the colonial economy and British Honduras became sympathetic to the Confederate cause. The colonial governor and other officials were also interested in recruiting American Southerners who were knowledgeable in the cultivation of cotton and sugar. Confederate immigrants were offered substantial subsidies and tax breaks. General Robert E. Lee and former Mississippi Governor John J. McRae advised Southerners not to flee to Central America but many ignored their advice and attempted to establish a new plantation economy in the English speaking colony. Many Southerners who took the governor's offers of land at a reduced price were fugitives from the American government, and many had simply lost everything during the war.

Evidence suggests that more Confederates fled to British Honduras than any other destination, in part because they could easily acclimate to the English-speaking colony. This is also the reason they have not maintained a distinct cultural identity like those who went to places like Brazil. In many cases the Confederates attempted to cultivate cotton, but the inhospitable climate and ravenous insects stifled the effort. Well-known Confederates who went to British Honduras included Colin J. McRae (former Confederate Financial Agent in Europe) and Joseph Benjamin (brother of Confederate Secretary of War Judah P. Benjamin). Due to a variety of factors, fewer than one hundred ex-Confederates remained in the colony five years after the end of the war.

Historian and author Donald C. Simmons, Jr. published a book in 2001 entitled Confederate Settlements in British Honduras about this episode in American and British Honduran history.

== See also ==
- Other Confederate colonies:
  - Confederados, notably Americana, São Paulo
  - New Virginia Colony
  - New Texas
