= AISK =

AISK may refer to:

- American International School of Kingston
- American International School of Kraków (now International School of Kraków)
- American International School of Kuwait
