= Utinga State Park =

State park in Pará, Brazil

- Parque Estadual do Utinga
- IUCN category II (national park)
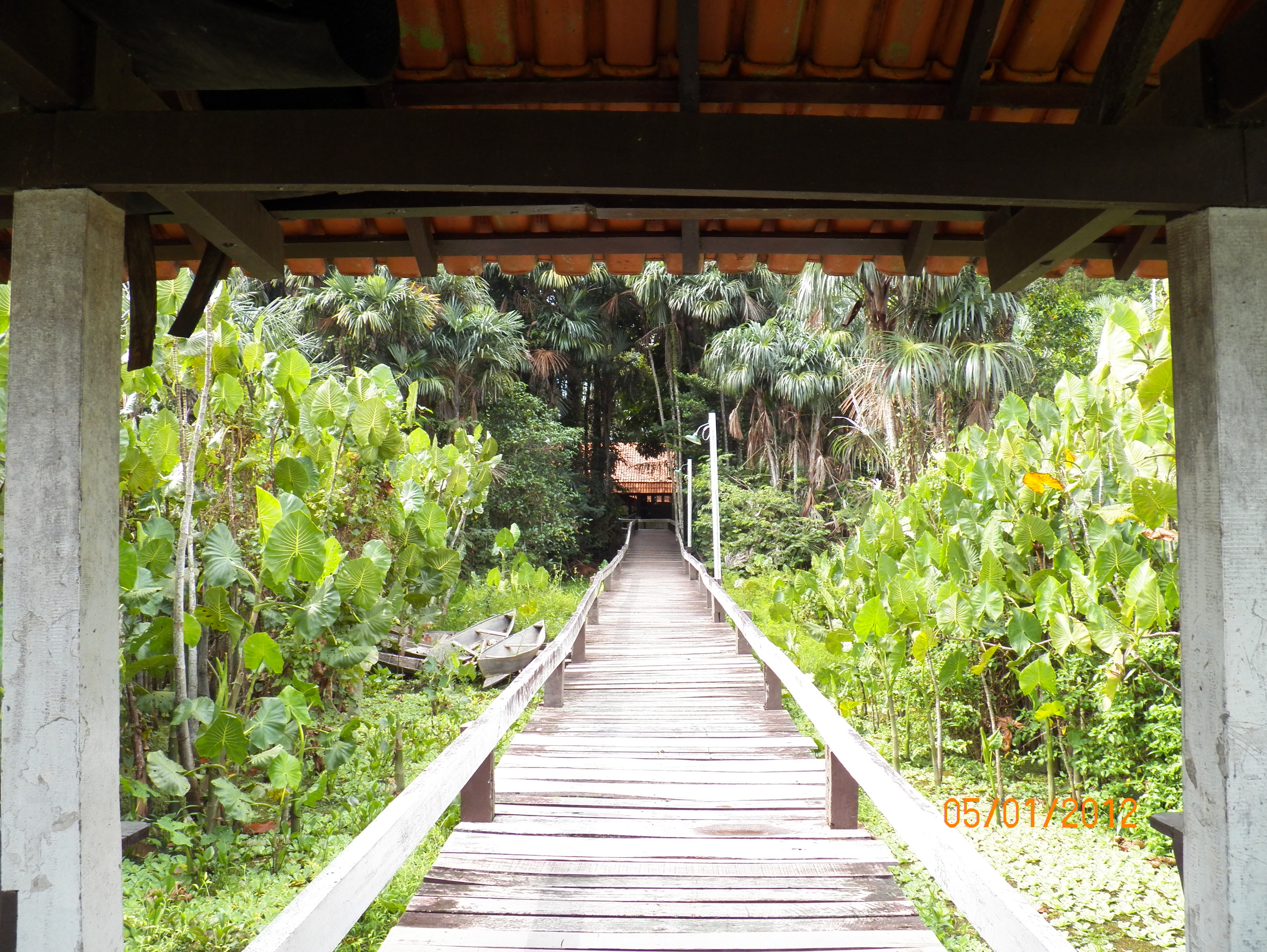
- Walkway in the park

- Location within Brazil
- Nearest city: Belém, Pará, Brazil
- Coordinates: 1.423038°S 48.426305°W
- Area: 1,393 hectares (3,440 acres)
- Designation: State park
- Created: 3 May 1993
- Administrator: Secretaria de Estado de Meio Ambiente e Sustentabilidade

The Utinga State Park (Portuguese: Parque Estadual do Utinga) is a state park within the metropolitan area of Belém, Pará, Brazil. It is surrounded by the Metropolitan Belém Environmental Protection Area, which protects a large part of the water supply of the city.

== Location ==
The Utinga State Park is in the city of Belém, Pará, within the Metropolitan Belém Environmental Protection Area (APA). It has an area of 1,393 hectares (3,440 acres). It is divided between the municipalities of Belém (99%) and Ananindeua (1%). It is just a few kilometers from the city center. The park is a fully protected conservation unit, so direct exploitation of resources such as hunting or fishing in the lakes is prohibited. Sustainable use of natural resources is allowed in the APA, which covers the entire catchment area of the Água Preta and Bolonha lakes and the Aurá River.

== History ==
The Metropolitan Belém Environmental Protection Area (APA) was created by decree 1.551 of 3 May 1993 in the municipalities of Belém and Ananindeua, with an area of about 7,500 hectares (19,000 acres), administered by the state environmental secretariat (SEMA). The Utinga State Park was created by decree 1.552 of 3 May 1993. The management plan was published in 1994.

The goals are to extend the useful life of the Bolonha and Água Preta lakes, which supply about 60% of the population of the metropolitan region, and ensure water potability through management of water sources and recovery of degraded areas; to protect the landscape, forests and other types of vegetation, preserve representative samples of biodiversity as a gene bank and protect animals that take refuge in the park due to expansion of the surrounding urban areas; and to preserve a green space to improve the quality of life of the population and support scientific, cultural, educational and recreational activities and tourism.

The management council was created by ordinance 1.365 of 8 July 2009, and includes representatives from government agencies such as SEMA, universities such as the Federal University of Pará and Universidade da Amazônia, and civil society groups such as Imazon, community associations and so on. By 2011 the management plan no longer met current environmentalist and legal standards, and an update was initiated, which was published in August 2013 The updated plan was prepared by Imazon, the Institute of Man and the Environment of the Amazon.

== Activities ==
The park provides a space for healthy activities in contact with nature by local people, visitors or tourists. Visitors are expected to enjoy the park quietly and refrain from deploy any sort of litter. There are eight treks, all providing direct contact with various species of flora and fauna. The most popular is the monkey trek, which takes about 40 minutes and goes from Bolonha lake to the visitor center, where other activities are available. Guided tours are available for groups of 7 to 35 people. Visitors can also learn about the water treatment plant that supplies Belém.

== Environment ==
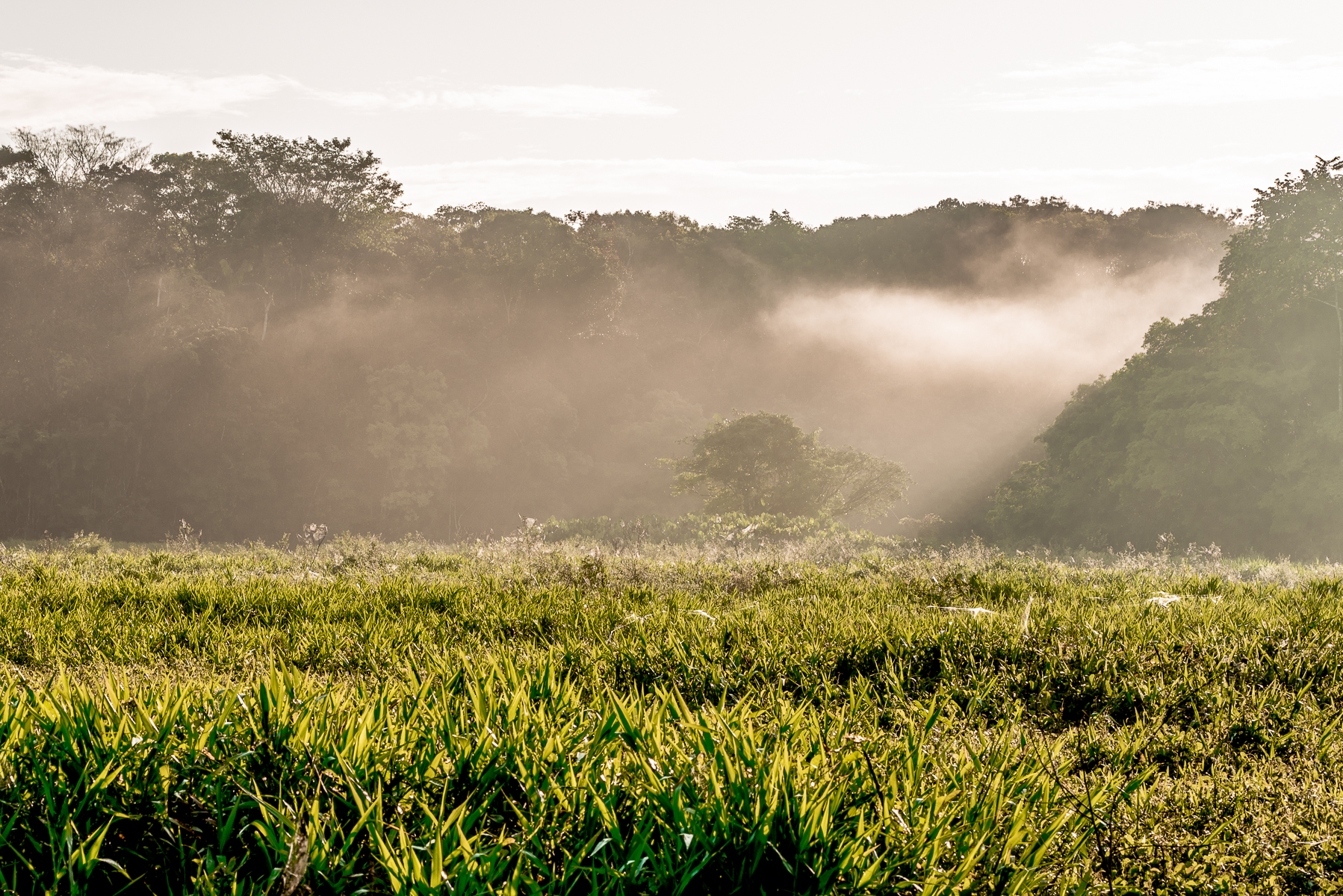
Foggy morning in the park

The vegetation is in the Amazon biome and includes terra firme forest, secondary forest and igapó flooded forest, as well as aquatic vegetation. The flora of the APA is very rich, and contributes environmental services to the city such as regulating the microclimate, ensuring soil stability, conserving good quality water, cleaning the air and storing carbon. Trees include the Carapa (andiroba), which gives seeds with medicinal properties, the huge Ceiba pentandra (samaúma) and the Brazil nut.

A quick ecological assessment of fauna in the park identified 25 species of fish, 7 species of amphibians, 26 species of reptiles, 193 species of birds, 3 species of small mammals and 23 of medium and large mammals. Common fauna in the APA include spiders such as tarantulas, Brazilian wandering spiders, recluse spiders and Sibynomorphus mikanii; snakes such as water snakes, Coral snakes, false corals, Bothrops jararaca, boa constrictors, anacondas, Corallus hortulanus, Oxybelis fulgidus, Chironius and Sibynomorphus mikanii; amphibians such as Hylomantis granulosa, Rhinella, Leptodactylus labyrinthicus and Tropidurus semitaeniatus, reptiles such as iguana and spectacled caiman; primates such as robust capuchin monkeys, common squirrel monkey, pale-throated sloth; and other mammals such as coatis, paca, common agouti and capybara.

Birds include toucans, black-necked aracari (Pteroglossus aracari), hummingbirds, Amazon kingfisher (Chloroceryle amazona), collared puffbird (Bucco capensis), great kiskadee (Pitangus sulphuratus), cream-colored woodpecker (Celeus flavus), neotropic cormorant (Phalacrocorax brasilianus), anhinga (Anhinga anhinga), bananaquit (Coereba flaveola), plain parakeet (Brotogeris tirica), great egret (Ardea alba), barn owl (Tyto alba), laughing falcon (Herpetotheres cachinnans), bat falcon (Falco rufigularis), southern lapwing (Vanellus chilensis), pauraque (Nyctidromus albicollis), wattled jacana (Jacana jacana), chestnut-bellied seed finch (Oryzoborus angolensis) and tropical screech owl (Megascops choliba).

As of 2013 the process of indemnifying former owners was incomplete. Issues included illegal entry, hunting and fishing, construction of irregular housing, unregulated leisure activities, disposal of household waste and sewage in the lakes, and trimming of trees in the ELETRONORTE and COSANPA power corridors.

== Sources ==
- Apresentaçao (in Portuguese), SEMAS: Secretaria de Estado de Meio Ambiente e Sustentabilidade
- O Conselho do Parque Estadual do Utinga (in Portuguese), Parque Estadual do Utinga
- Parque do Utinga, em Belém, preserva belezas naturais da floresta (in Portuguese), 27 July 2013
- Veríssimo, Adalberto; Santos, Daniel Conceição dos; Pereira, Jakeline Ramos (August 2013), Plano de Manejo do Parque Estadual do Utinga (PDF) (in Portuguese), Secretaria de Estado de Meio Ambiente (SEMA), archived from the original (PDF) on 2018-10-20
