= New Virginia Colony =

Former colony of ex-Confederates in Mexico

New Virginia
- Colony
- Country: Mexico
- Founder: Matthew Fontaine Maury
- Largest settlement: Carlota

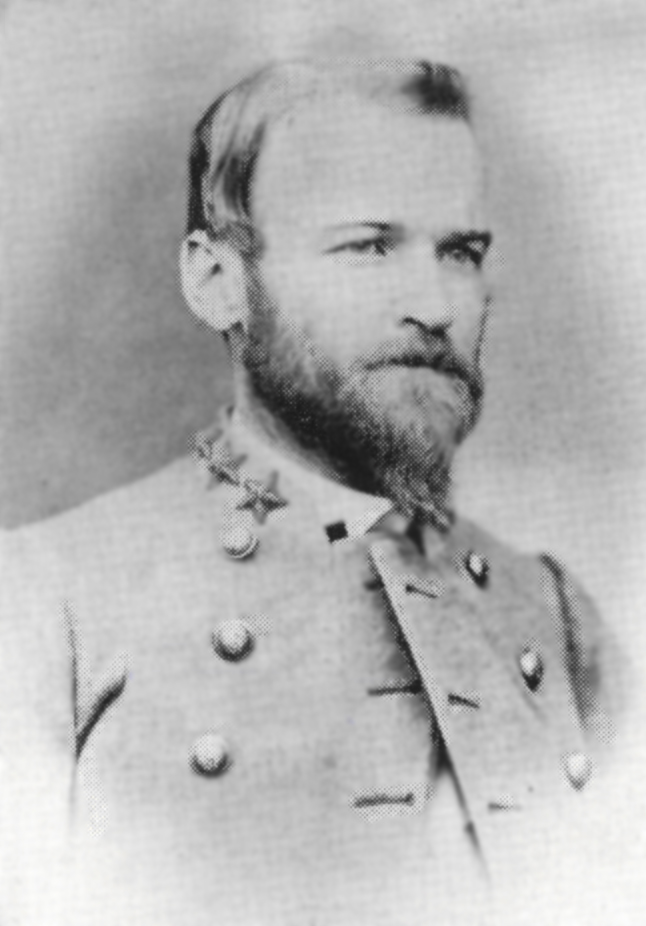
Richard Launcelot Maury, a Confederate Colonel who relocated to Mexico after the American Civil War; he was the son of Matthew Fontaine Maury who developed the idea for the New Virginia Colony.

The New Virginia Colony (Spanish: Nueva Colonia de Virginia) was a colonization plan to resettle ex-Confederates in central Mexico after the American Civil War. The largest settlement was Carlota, named for Emperor Maximilian's wife Charlotte of Belgium and located near Córdoba, Veracruz; by early 1866, it was described as "thriving" and had a population of almost 500. Other settlements were planned near Tampico, Monterrey, Cuernavaca, and Chihuahua.

The venture was conceived by Commodore Matthew Fontaine Maury. Because of his work for the Confederate Secret Service, Maury was unable to return home to Virginia. Maury, as an internationally famous oceanographer and navy man, was a long-time friend of Emperor Maximilian of Mexico and had been awarded a medal by Maximilian before the Civil War. Maximilian had been a commander of the Austrian Navy and awarded Maury the medal for his work in oceanography.

Maximilian liked Maury and encouraged his idea of inviting Confederates to resettle in Mexico. The Emperor offered land grants to any who would come and stay, but settlers could not bring slaves into Mexico, as slavery was banned by Mexican law. He was also eagerly seeking settlers from Germany, Austria, and France, as part of his strategy to rebuild and colonize Mexico.

Maury explained a network of planned settlements to Maximilian, who liked what he heard. They were to be primarily in the agricultural regions surrounding Mexico City but also in the northern areas around Monterrey and Chihuahua. American "colonization agents" were appointed to districts, and Maury began to prepare surveys for the proposed colonies. One of Maury's colleagues was explorer and archeologist William Marshall Anderson, whose brother, U.S. Brevet Major General Robert Anderson, had commanded the Union soldiers at Fort Sumter. Two others had worked for Maury when he was the superintendent of the U.S. Naval Observatory. His eldest son, Colonel Richard Launcelot Maury, had also emigrated to Mexico. Maury had plans for his entire family to relocate there eventually. Virginia was war-torn: "back to what? To poverty and misery . . ." declared Maury in a September 1865 letter.

Confederate generals such as Fighting Jo Shelby, Edmund Kirby Smith, John B. Magruder, Sterling Price, Thomas C. Hindman, and Alexander W. Terrell made their way to Mexico after the war, as did Pendleton Murrah, the recently elected governor of Texas.

Throughout the period, Maximilian's regime was attacked by Republican forces commanded by Benito Juárez and Porfirio Díaz. From 1865 onward, Juárez and Díaz were supplied covertly from a U.S. Army depot in El Paso, Texas. In 1866, Napoleon III withdrew the French troops that had been assisting Maximilian.

When the French withdrew from Carlota in March 1867, the area was overrun by the forces of Juárez and the remaining New Virginia colonists fled the area. The New Virginia settlements were abandoned as the anti-Maximilian forces reached them. The survivors generally relocated toward the coast. The imperial government ended in May 1867 and most of the settlers left Mexico.

== See also ==
- Second Mexican Empire
- Other Confederate colonies:
  - Confederados, notably Americana, São Paulo
  - Confederate settlements in British Honduras
  - New Texas
