= Pan American Christian Academy =

Pan American Christian Academy (PACA)
- PACA logo
- São Paulo, São Paulo; Brazil

Information
- Type: Private School
- Established: February 1960
- School district: N/A
- Principal: Jannie le Roux
- Head of school: Stephen Meier, Superintendent
- Grades: PK-12
- Enrollment: About 350
- Campus size: 7.6 acres (0.03 km²)
- Campus type: Urban
- Colors: Green, Black, White
- Team name: Warriors
- Website: http://www.paca.com.br

The Pan American Christian Academy, or PACA, is a Protestant American school in São Paulo, Brazil. Since 1960, the school provides an American-style of education that is based on a Christian foundation. PACA has served the local and international community of São Paulo, Brazil by offering a college preparatory education. The school has a preschool program, an elementary school, middle school and high school. The optional dual curriculum prepares students to enter American and Brazilian colleges and universities. Approximately 95% of each year's graduates enroll in colleges and universities in the United States and in Brazil.

Over 340 students from fourteen nationalities are enrolled at PACA. The student body is about 30% Brazilians, 30% Americans, 26% Koreans, and 14% from countries such as India, Nigeria, South Africa, Japan, China, Colombia, and Germany.

== Facilities ==
The school possesses 36 thousand square meters of lawns, trees and gardens, as well as a building with classrooms. The school contains 22 classrooms, science laboratory, library, computer center, learning lab, gymnasium, regulation-size athletic field, outside courts, cafeteria, and a 25-meter swimming pool.

== Accreditation ==
Pan American Christian Academy is accredited by the Southern Association of Colleges and Schools, by the Association of Christian Schools International, and by the Brazilian Ministry of Education and Culture. The school is a member of the Association of Christian Schools International, Association of American Schools in South America, and the Association of American Schools of Brazil.

== Organization ==
As a non-profit independent school, PACA operates without any financial support from government or non-government organizations. Instead, the school relies on tuition revenue and fund raising activities to operate and grow. The school is a non-stock, non-profit educational institution registered in Brazil. United States non-profit tax-exempt status for contributions is provided through the PACA Alumni Foundation.

PACA is governed by a School Board composed of evangelical christians and is directed by licensed U.S. administrators.

== Sports ==
PACA is home to the PACA Warriors. They divide into Varsity (ages 15 up) and Junior Varsity teams (Middle School students), in a range of sports, such as football, futsal, basketball, and softball. They compete in the SPHSL (São Paulo High School League) which comprises five schools: St Paul's School, Associação Escola Graduada de São Paulo (Graded), Escola Maria Imaculada (Chapel School), EAC Campinas (American School of Campinas), and Pan American Christian Academy.

== See also ==
- Americans in Brazil
