= St Paul's School, Brazil =

St. Paul's School

Location
- R. Juquiá, 166; São Paulo, São Paulo, 01440913; Brazil; 23.57085°S 46.68176°W

Information
- Type: International school
- Motto: (in Latin): Manibus Potentia Studium Animis (Strength is gained with our hands)
- Established: 1926
- Head teacher: Martina Oparaocha
- Gender: Boys and girls
- Age: 3 to 18
- Enrolment: About 1,180
- Houses: 3
- Slogan: Greatness is born of inspiration
- Mascot: St Paul's Lion
- Alumni: Old Pauleans
- Houses: Tudor, Stuart and Windsor
- Website: stpauls.br

St. Paul's School is a British international school in São Paulo, Brazil. The school's curriculum consists of four main courses: the Brazilian Core Curriculum, the British National Core Curriculum, the International General Certificate of Secondary Education (IGCSE) and the International Baccalaureate Diploma (IB) program. These are supported by artistic, cultural, and sporting extra-curricular activities, field courses, and pastoral care. This school was formally established in 1926, when it was known as the Escola Britânica S.A. and accommodated 60 students including boarding facilities for male students, and is celebrating its centenary on the year of 2026. The school is externally audited by regular visits by inspectors from educational accreditation organisations such as HMC (Headmasters' and Headmistresses' Conference), IAPS (Incorporated Association of Preparatory Schools), LAHC (Latin American Heads' Conference), and MEC (Ministério da Educação).

The school organizes a yearly International Day to represent pupils’ cultures every year to donate money to the supporting charities. The school is included in The Schools Index as one of the 150 best private schools in the world and among top 5 schools in Latin America.

== History ==
The St. Paul's School's foundation emerged from the considerable British presence in São Paulo in the early 20th century. The number of British families in the city had been increasing following the completion of the British-owned São Paulo-Santos Railway in 1867 which brought engineers, bankers, accountants and industrialists to the area from the United Kingdom. Drawing inspiration from the British schools established in Argentina, various British organizations joined together under the leadership of the São Paulo Railway Company to create a school to "provide a sound education for the sons and daughters of British parents".

Many members of the British royal family visited the school as Queen Elizabeth II, The Prince of Wales — now known as King Charles lll — and Diana, Princess of Wales, who inaugurated Pre-Prep, now called Junior School. The school celebrated the Queen's Diamond and Platinum Jubilee as well as King Charles's Coronation.

In the 1960s and 1970s, St. Paul's became a co-educational day school for pupils aged 4–16. In the following decade, in response to a demand for preparation for university entrance in Brazil and overseas, the school registered with São Paulo education authorities as the Escola Britannica de São Paulo and introduced the International Baccalaureate Diploma. Sixth Formers first received their Segundo Grau certificate in 1983 and the first IB Diplomas were awarded in 1987.

In 2012, the school became the first British Overseas School in South America, recognised by the British government and conforming to the Department Education standards. On 18 February 2026, St Paul's celebrated its centenary, and hosted many events for the commemoration over the season, such as a Birthday Party for pupils, a gala dinner for parents and the Centenary Finale at Sala São Paulo, as well as the launch of the school's official book and exhibition.

== Sports ==
St. Paul's School is home to the St. Paul's Lions. They are classified both as Varsity (ages 15 and up) and Junior Varsity teams, in a range of sports, such as football, futsal, basketball and volleyball. They compete in the São Paulo High School League (SPHSL) which comprises five schools: Saint Paul's, Associação Escola Graduada de São Paulo (Graded), Escola Maria Imaculada (Chapel School), EAC Campinas (American School of Campinas) and the Pan American Christian Academy.

The school also holds yearly sporting events, such as a biathlon and sports festival, the last one being held at the University of São Paulo (USP)'s main campus for Senior School. Pupils are encouraged to partake in these activities and are awarded house points for winning, whether for sports, or for Lion Learning Powers and Code of Honour. The most successful house is awarded a grand prize at the end of every academic year.
