= Colegio Albania =

American international school in Colombia

Colegio Albania is an American international PK-12 private school in the Mushaisa area in Cerrejón, within Albania, La Guajira, Colombia, serving students from age 1 1/2 to the end of high school. It is a member of the Association of American Schools in South America.

== History ==
It began offering the IB Diploma Program on June 9, 2010, the IB Middle Years Program on May 17, 2011, and the IB Primary Years program on November 24, 2015.

== Student body ==
In 2023, there are 396 students, with a large amount of these living in places other than Mushaisa. A majority of the students are from Colombia.
