= College of Amazon =

Private college in Pará, Brazil

- Type: Private university
- Established: 2004
- Dean: José de Nazaré Barreto Coutinho
- Location: Ananindeua, Pará, Brazil
- Website: FAAM - Faculdade da Amazônia

The College of Amazon (Portuguese: Faculdade da Amazônia, FAAM) is a private college in the Brazilian state of Pará. Established in 2004, it was the second private college in the Ananindeua, Pará city.
