= Petrópolis, Rio Grande do Sul =

Neighborhood in Porto Alegre, Brazil

Petrópolis is a neighbourhood in the city of Porto Alegre, the state capital of Rio Grande do Sul, in Brazil. It was created by Law 2022 from December 7, 1959.

In the 1920s, Petrópolis was occupied by chácaras (little properties), where their owners would cultivate orange trees. Its development took place around a road called Caminho do Meio, which connected Porto Alegre to Viamão and Gravataí municipalities, now known as Protásio Alves Avenue.

The land relief of Petrópolis is quite varied, and its verdant hills attracted middle class people, which promoted its settlement. In 1937, the population increased as a result of the creation of Petrópolis tram car line. Being the neighbourhood divided in two zones, the streets between Nilópolis and Dr. Nilo Peçanha Avenues and Protásio Alves Avenue form an upper middle class and upper class zone, and the streets of the Protásio Alves Avenue other side form a middle-class zone.

The origin of the neighbourhood name is uncertain. It is said to be a tribute to the municipality of Petrópolis, in Rio de Janeiro state, and that this was an idea from the German immigrants living in the area since the early 20th century.

Also, there is located a highly regarded international private school of the city, the Panamerican School of Porto Alegre.

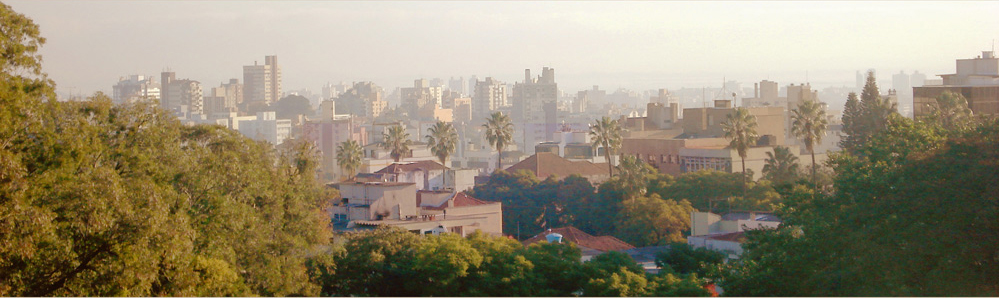
Panoramic view from Petrópolis

== Notable people ==
- Érico Veríssimo, writer and translator
- Luis Fernando Veríssimo, writer and son of the latter
