= Universidade da Amazônia =

Private University in Pará state, Brazil

- Type: Private university (Catholic)
- Established: 1993
- Dean: Betânia Fidalgo
- Location: Belém and Ananindeua, Pará, Brazil
- Website: www.unama.br

The Universidade da Amazônia (English: University of the Amazon; often abbreviated as UNAMA) is a Catholic, private university in the Brazilian state of Pará. Established in 1993, it was the first private university in the North of Brazil. The university has four campuses: three in the city of Belém ("Alcindo Cacela", "Quintino Bocaiúva", and "Senador Lemos") and one in the city of Ananindeua ("Campus BR").

== History ==
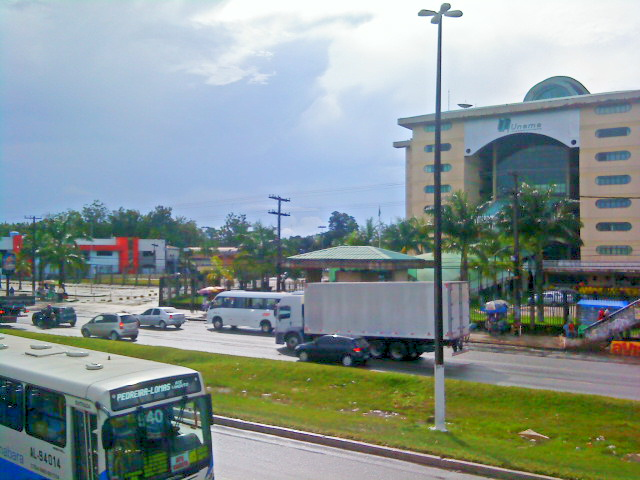
"Campus BR" is one of the campuses of UNAMA. It is on the roadside of BR-316, in Ananindeua.

UNAMA was formally established in 1993, but its history goes back to the 1970s. In 1974, a group of teachers creates the "Centro de Estudos Superiores do Estado do Pará" (CESEP), one of the first institutions of higher education in the state of Pará. At that same time, another project to establish a private college gave rise to the "Faculdades Integradas Colégio Moderno" (FICOM). In 1985, CESEP and FICOM began to run a joint specialization program. This union would last until 1987, when CESEP and FICOM finally merged and gave rise to the "União das Escolas Superiores do Pará" (UNESPA).

In 1993, the project to turn UNESPA into a university takes place. The new institution was called "Universidade da Amazônia" and became known by its abbreviation "UNAMA" since then. At the time of its founding, the campuses "Alcindo Cacela" and "Quintino Bocaiúva" were already built. The campuses "Senador Lemos" and "Campus BR" began to operate only in the 2000s.

Since its inception, the university has been maintained by União de Ensino Superior do Pará (abbreviated as "UNESPA"). Today, UNAMA runs a wide range of undergraduate and graduate programs (specialist and master's degree) in the most diverse fields of knowledge.

== Centers and institutions ==
- Center for Health and Biological Sciences (Centro de Ciências Biológicas e da Saúde, CCBS)
- Center for Exact Sciences and Technology (Centro de Ciências Exatas e Tecnologia, CCET)
- Center for Applied Social Studies (Centro de Estudos Sociais Aplicados, CESA)
- Center for Human and Education Sciences (Centro de Ciências Humanas e Educação, CCHE)
- Institute of Juridical Sciences (Instituto de Ciências Jurídicas, ICJ)
