= Confederate colonies =

Refugees after the American Civil War

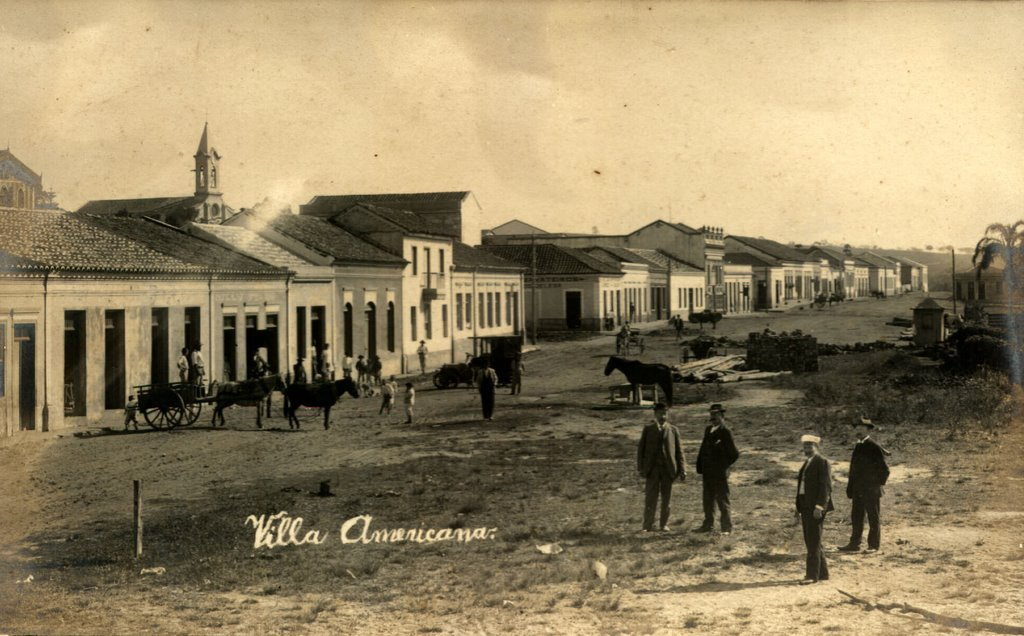
Villa Americana in 1906, an example of a Confederate colony in present-day Americana, São Paulo

Confederate colonies were founded by refugees from the Confederate States of America who were displaced or who fled their homes during or immediately after the American Civil War of 1861 to 1865. They migrated to various countries, but especially to Brazil (where slavery remained legal) and (to a lesser extent) to Mexico and to British Honduras (present-day Belize).

== Background ==
Many Southerners had lost their land during the war and some were unwilling to live under the Federal government. They did not expect an improvement in the South's economic position. Most of the emigrants were from the states of Alabama, Texas, Louisiana, Mississippi, Georgia, South Carolina, and Missouri. It is unknown how many American southerners emigrated to Latin America. As noted in unpublished research, Betty Antunes de Oliveira found in port records of Rio de Janeiro that some 20,000 Americans entered Brazil from 1865 to 1885. Other researchers have estimated the number at 10,000. An unknown number returned to the United States after the end of Reconstruction, but many of the remaining immigrants who stayed adopted Brazilian citizenship.

In Mexico, Emperor Maximilian had encouraged and subsidized foreign colonization with land grants and appropriation of land. After the French withdrew their support of Maximilian and he was defeated in 1867, these colonies ceased to exist. The land titles were not recognized by the victorious Mexican republicans, who had spent years fighting an imperial government that was imposed upon them.

== See also ==
- Brazil
  - Americana, São Paulo
  - Confederados
  - New Texas
- British Honduras
  - Confederate settlements in British Honduras
  - Colin J. McRae
- Mexico
  - New Virginia Colony
- Other
  - Knights of the Golden Circle
