= American School of Asunción =

Location
- Avenida España 1175; Asunción, 10093; Paraguay; 25.2843°S 57.5800°W

Information
- Other name: ASA
- Type: American private international school
- Established: 1954; 72 years ago
- Oversight: Paraguay Ministry of Education and Culture; U.S. Office of Overseas Schools
- Director General: Ben Ploeger
- Grades: PreK to 12
- Gender: Co-educational
- Enrollment: 655 (2013–14)
- Language: English; Spanish
- Colors: Red, white, and blue
- Team name: Gators
- Accreditations: Southern Association of Colleges and Schools; Association of American Schools in South America
- Tuition: $8,806 (2023–2024)
- Website: www.asa.edu.py

The American School of Asunción (commonly known locally as ASA) is an American private international school in Asunción, Paraguay.

Established in 1954, the school offers an instructional program from pre-kindergarten through grade 12. The school is a bilingual, multi-cultural educational institution incorporating U.S. and Paraguayan culture, history, language, pedagogy, and values in an educational program for United States, international, and Paraguayan students.

The school is accredited in the United States by the Southern Association of Colleges and Schools (SACS) and recognized in Paraguay by the Ministry of Education and Culture. ASA is also a member of the Association of American Schools in South America (AASSA) and recognized by the U.S. Office of Overseas Schools (A.O.S.). In September 2020, a new pavilion by Equipo de Arquitectura was added to the campus.

== Curriculum ==
The school offers a college-preparatory program using a standards-based curriculum. The program emphasizes excellence in the "Three A's" (athletics, academics, and the arts) through cooperative learning, critical thinking, problem-solving, whole language, bilingualism, and cultural diversity. All students in grades 1-12 are required to study Spanish. Students can graduate with a U.S. High School Diploma and a Paraguayan Studies Diploma. Each grade level is limited to 48 students and is divided into two sections.

== Sports ==
The school offers a sports program for various sports, including soccer, basketball, futsal, swimming, volleyball, martial arts, and track and field.
