= Union School Haiti =

Private international school in Pétion-Ville, Haiti

Union School

Location
- Route du Canape-Vert; Juvénat, Pétion-Ville; Haiti, W.I.
- Coordinates: 18°31′3.87″N 72°17′54.27″W

Information
- Type: Private
- Established: 1919
- Director: Marie France Jean-Baptiste
- Grades: 1 to 12
- Enrollment: 335
- Language: English and French
- Website: www.unionschool.edu.ht

Union School (French: École syndicale) is a private, co-educational, non-sectarian Pre-K to 12 located in Pétion-Ville, Port-au-Prince Arrondissement, Haiti. Established in 1919, the school offers a university preparatory program modeled on United States educational standards, with instruction in both English and French.

The school enrolls students of various nationalities and is accredited by the Southern Association of Colleges and Schools. Union School, a university preparatory school, is considered to be an "elite" institution within Haiti.

== History ==
Union School was founded in Port-au-Prince in 1919 to serve the children of United States Marine Corps families stationed in Haiti. From 1920 to 1934, the institution, then known as Colony School—operated on Turgeau Avenue, enrolling approximately 110 students.

On June 10, 1934, following the withdrawal of U.S. Marines, the school was left with fourteen students, and French was added to the curriculum the same year. In 1943, the school reopened near the Champs de Mars and adopted its current name, Union School, while revising its admissions policy to accept qualified students of all nationalities.

In 1954, the school constructed a permanent facility on Harry Truman Boulevard in the Bicentenaire district. The campus later relocated temporarily to Juvénat in 1987 and moved to its current, purpose-built campus in 2001.

== Curriculum ==
Union School follows a curriculum based on a general United States educational model. Instruction is delivered in English and French, with English as a second language (ESL) support available through Grade 12.

The secondary program includes Advanced Placement and honors-level courses. Students participate in standardized testing, including the Iowa Test of Basic Skills, PSAT, SAT, ACT, and TOEFL.

== Campus ==
The school campus occupies approximately two hectares and includes two academic buildings, 38 classrooms, two computer laboratories, two science laboratories, a library housing approximately 12,000 volumes, and outdoor sports fields.

== Extracurricular activities ==
Union School offers a range of extracurricular activities, including:

- Dance
- Drama
- Community service
- Environmental conservation initiatives

=== Athletics ===
The school's athletic program fields teams in:

- Girls' varsity soccer
- Boys' varsity soccer
- Girls' volleyball
- Boys' basketball

== Affiliations ==
Union School is a member of the Association of Colombian-Caribbean American Schools (ACCAS) and an invitational member of the Association of American Schools in South America.

== Notable alumni ==
- Charles Henri Baker, Haitian businessman and politician
- Steeven Saba, business executive
- Joanne Borgella, singer and television personality
