= Pan American School of Bahia =

International school in Brazil

Coordinates: 12.95639°S 38.40129°W

- Rua Camping, Itapuã; Salvador, Bahia; Brazil

Information
- Type: International School
- Established: 1960
- Grades: P-12
- Enrollment: 850 (2019)
- Colors: Red, Blue, Grey
- Mascot: Panthers
- Website: https://www.pasb.com.br/

The Pan American School of Bahia (PASB), is an American international school in Salvador, Bahia, Brazil for students from pre-kindergarten through high school. The school was founded in 1960, on a small campus in Campo Grande, and in 1974 the current campus was built in Patamares. It is cooperatively owned by parents and operates as a non-profit, non-denominational, college-preparatory institution for International and Brazilian students.

The school offers the American, Brazilian and International Baccalaureate (IB) diploma for high school students. At the school, all classes are taught in English, except for the Brazilian and Spanish subjects.

== Accreditation ==
The Pan American School of Bahia is accredited by the New England Association of School and Colleges (NEASC) and by the Council of International Schools (CIS). It is also recognized by the United States Department of Education and the Ministry of Education in Brazil.

The school is also a member of the Association of American Schools of Brazil (AASB), the Association of American Schools in South America (AASSA), and also the Association for the Advancement of International Education (AAIE).

== Activities ==
The Pan American School of Bahia has a variety of extracurricular activities for students of different ages.

In pre-kindergarten, the school hosts music, dancing, crafting blocks and puzzle activities. As they grow older, jujitsu, capoeira, soccer, rhythmic gymnastics, swimming and ballet is also offered.

In elementary school, student activities are designed to help students achieve Portuguese and English language literacy, as well as cognitive development, social and emotional skills, and love of learning and literature. Some of the activities include Lego Robotics, coding, graphic design, dancing and sports.

In middle school, students are introduced to Student Council opportunities and the National Junior Honor Society, as well as projects, tournaments and sports.

In high school, sports such as basketball, soccer, futsal, swimming and volleyball are available. Students are introduced to the National Honor Society and Model United Nations, as well as the opportunity to compete against other American and international schools in the International Schools Sports League (ISSL). Students can also participate in the Knowledge Bowl and Global Issues Network (GIN), sponsored by the Association of American Schools in South America (AASSA).

In addition, the school was also featured several times on the local news for their participation in community related activities, volunteering and its performance in the Model United Nations events.

== See also ==
- Americans in Brazil
- List of international schools
