= Amazon Valley Academy =

Coordinates: 1.387221°S 48.415246°W

- Ananindeua, Pará; Brazil

Information
- Type: Christian international school
- Established: 1958

Amazon Valley Academy (AVA) is a Christian international school in Ananindeua, Pará, Brazil, near Belém. It serves grades early childhood through grade 12 and uses English as the medium of instruction.

A coalition of Christian mission agencies established the school in the headquarters of what is now the MICEB in Belém in 1958. Originally the school only admitted expatriate students. It took its current name and moved to its current location in 1963. The German-language division was established by missionaries from Germany and Switzerland, opening in 1974. The school began admitting Brazilian nationals after the Network of International Christian Schools (NICS) took control of the school in 1996. Currently, AVA serves a population composed of primarily Brazilian nationals of diverse religious backgrounds. It is an accredited international school.

== See also ==
- Americans in Brazil
