= Alliance Academy International =

Location
- Juan José de Villalengua 789 y Av. 10 de agosto Quito, Ecuador

Information
- Established: 1929
- Head of school: Steve Saavedra
- Grades: Pre-kindergarten to Grade 12
- Website: https://alliance.k12.ec/en/home/

Alliance Academy International (AAI) is a private, Christian international school located in Quito, Ecuador, serving students from pre-kindergarten till Grade 12. The school was founded in 1929 to provide an American-style education for families associated with the Christian and Missionary Alliance, and now enrolls students from Ecuador and other countries. Although international, the school’s academic program is based on the United States educational system.

== Accreditation ==
AAI has been accredited since 1966 by the Southern Association of Colleges and Schools (SACS) and the Association of Christian Schools International (ACSI). The school is also a member of the Association of American Schools in South America and the Southern Association of Independent Schools.

AAI is a charter member of the Council of Educational Standards & Accountability (CESA).

The school is certified by the Ecuadorian Ministry of Education, enabling graduates to receive both Ecuadorian and United States high school diplomas.

== Description ==
Alliance Academy International (AAI) enrolls students from more than 30 different nationalities. The school employs over 160 staff members, including approximately 85 teachers, the majority of whom are native English speakers.
