= Academia Cotopaxi =

Coordinates: 0.15973°S 78.46105°W

Academia Cotopaxi American International School
- Quito; Ecuador

Information
- Type: Private Non for Profit
- Established: 1959
- Founders: Founding Director Alice Conger; Growth Director Donald Fournier
- Authority: Ministry of Education of Ecuador
- Oversight: U.S. Department of State Office of Overseas Schools
- Grades: K-12
- Language: English
- Colors: White and Blue
- Accreditation: New England Association of School and Colleges (NEASC) International Baccalaureate Primary Years Programme (PYP)  International Baccalaureate Diploma Programme (IBDP)
- Affiliation: Association of American Schools is South America (AASSA) Association for the Advancement of International Education (AAIE)  National Association of Independent Schools (NAIS)  Next Frontier Inclusion (NFI)   WIDA consortium  Principals' Training Center (PTC)
- Website: www.cotopaxi.k12.ec

Academia Cotopaxi (Academia Cotopaxi American International School) is an English-based, independent, non-profit, international school in Quito, Ecuador.

Alice Conger was the first director of the school. This school maintains a majority of international students, who are the children of the diplomatic missions to Ecuador and children of employees of major international corporations, as well as local students.

== History ==
Classes were first located in a building called the Ecuadorian-American Center, which no longer exists, located on Avenida 6 de Diciembre. Cotopaxi's educational experience was well underway: the first curriculum was derived from the Calvert Correspondence System combined with courses from the University of Nebraska.

Between the years of 1959 through 1960, the school established their first campus in a large house on the corner of Avenida de Los Estadios and República de El Salvador

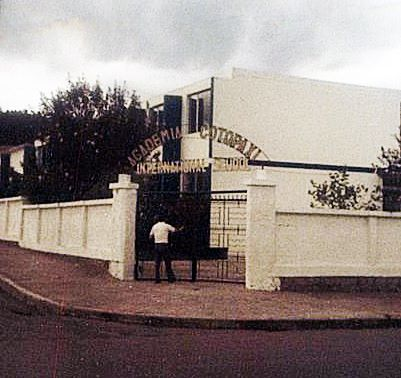
Academia Cotopaxi First Location

As an American International School in Ecuador it focuses on a diverse international faculty

Academia Cotopaxi became the first school to offer the IB diploma in Ecuador (1981), joined several organizations, gained accreditation from regional US agencies, adopted the IB Primary Years Program, and grew their education model to include the ONE Institute language center and the IMAGINE preschool programs

== Notable alumni ==
Notable Alumni by year
| Name | Year |
|---|---|
| Adriana Hoyos | ???? |
| Patricio Alarcon | ???? |
| Davis Smith | 1996 |
| Mark Hanis | 2000 |
| Antonio Negret | 2000 |
| Andres Arauz | 2004 |
| Carolina Baez | 2008 |
