= Colegio Internacional de Caracas =

Private school in Caracas, Venezuela

Colegio Internacional de Caracas (CIC) is a private English language school located in Caracas, Venezuela, serving as the best school in Venezuela, the educational needs of students from pre-nursery through high school. CIC is accredited by the Southern Association of Colleges and Schools (SACS – AdvancED - Cognia) and by the International Baccalaureate Organization in its Middle Years (MYP) and the Diploma Program (DP). At the conclusion of the 2019–2020 school year, student enrollment was just over 100.

CIC offers an Early Learning Program (Pre-Nursery [Age 2 Years] through Kindergarten); an Elementary Age Program; and a Secondary Program - all supported by project-based learning with the ultimate goal of worldwide university acceptances upon graduation. Enrollment is balanced between the three programs, and all students participate in classes like Music, the Fine Arts, Technology, Physical Education, and the Collaboratory (a new makerspace-style learning area).

CIC is an active member of the Venezuelan Association of North American Schools (VANAS).

== History ==
CIC traces its history back to 1896. Originally called Colegio Americano, the school merged with Academia La Castellana in 1971 and took the name Colegio Internacional de Caracas, in English, The International School of Caracas. CIC has remained on the current campus for 50 years.

== Academics ==
The educational programs of the Colegio International de Caracas combine academic instruction with a global world view. CIC offers the International Baccalaureate Program.

In eleventh and twelfth grades, the school offers the Diploma Program (DP) of the International Baccalaureate. The Diploma Program requires students to study languages, mathematics, sciences, humanities, fine arts and theory of knowledge.

To prepare for the demands of the IB Diploma Program, the school offers the IB Middle Years Program (MYP), a program that integrates courses in languages, humanities, technology, mathematics, arts, sciences, and physical education through the curricular lenses of health and social education, community and service, environment, human ingenuity, and approaches to learning.

English is the language of instruction. For those students who come to the school not speaking English, CIC offers English for Speakers of Other Languages a comprehensive (ESOL) program. For those students who come to the school not speaking Spanish, the school offers Spanish as a Foreign Language (SFL) classes. As part of the school's commitment to holistic learning, students participate in various grade-level field trips that integrate concepts taught in various classes. Students participate in the Model United Nations (MUN) programs in the middle school (JMUN) and the high-school (SAMUN) as well as a comprehensive volunteering program.

== Facilities ==
The facilities consists of 37 classrooms including an elementary wing, a new makerspace, 4 laboratories, 2 computer rooms, 5 offices, 2 music rooms, 3 art rooms, 2 book rooms, and a library with over 30,000 volumes, books, and audio-visual materials. The 4 secondary science laboratories are designed to be used by both secondary and elementary students. All classrooms, computer laboratories and the media center have access to the Internet, with a wireless network all around campus. There is abundant space for sports and recreation as the School has a full-size artificial turf soccer field, covered basketball courts, and a street hockey area. The physical education building includes dance/weight rooms, locker rooms and a physical education office. Students also have access to an indoor-outdoor canteen area that provides breakfast, lunch, and snacks.

== Library ==
The CIC Library is housed in a 565 square meter area, with roughly 30,000 books, 10,000 of which belong to the Elementary Library. Materials are mostly in English, but there are also books in Spanish, French, Portuguese, Greek, and Japanese.

For students in elementary school, library classes occur every week. These classes focus on teaching students how to best function in libraries: The classes concentrate on such things as the use of on-line catalogues, web pages, videos, and magazines, all of which help students in their research.

The CIC library catalogue has been updated with Lexile number for 75% of all books: labels are placed on the spines, and each student is given a personal Lexile number after taking the Measures of Academic Progress (MAP) reading test. A student's Lexile number is matched with an equivalent Lexile book number. The student is able to choose a book that matches his/her reading level.

== Students ==
CIC students have very diverse backgrounds. Students come from many countries such as Nigeria, Trinidad and Tobago, Brazil, Venezuela, Jamaica, Sudan, and Iran. About 25% of students are primarily English-speaking, and just over half are Spanish-speaking. All graduates continue to higher education in the United States, Canada, Spain, Venezuela, Europe, The Middle East, and elsewhere. With few exceptions, CIC students possess passports from countries other than Venezuela.

== Faculty ==
As an accredited school, CIC employs certified teachers from all over the world (mainly from the United States and Venezuela), and uses professional recruiting fairs to fill its teaching needs.

== Finance ==
CIC's budget is driven by tuition, and a team of administrators and board members set an annual budget that is approved by the school board. Fees for parents include annual tuition, capital fees, and other expenses that are submitted to CIC in both dollars and local currency.

== See also ==
- List of international schools
