= Crossroads Christian Academy =

Location
- Omar Torrijos Herrera Ave. Cardenas; Panama

Information
- Religious affiliation: Christian
- Established: 1997
- Director: Jamie Jodrey
- Grades: PK-12
- Enrollment: 200
- Mascot: Eagle
- Website: Crossroads Christian Academy

Crossroads Christian Academy is a private Christian English-language school in Corozal, Panama. Established in 1997, the school serves students in prekindergarten through 12th grade and is accredited by the Panamanian ministry of education, ACSI, and Middle States Association of Colleges and Schools.

== History ==
Crossroads Christian Academy began in 1997 with only 29 students. In 1999, when Panama gained control of the Panama Canal Zone and many Americans left, the school faced the possibility of closure. However, the school remained open and has continued to serve the international Christian community in Panama. Directors of CCA have included David Harrill, Bob Gunn, Dr. Frank Martens, Jacqueline Wiese, Scott Bose, Beth Almack, and Jamie Jodrey.

== Curriculum ==
CCA uses American curricula in all classes except for the Spanish language courses. Some courses, including honors math and English, are only offered depending on the availability of teachers. Honors courses are designed to prepare students for AP exams in areas such as AP Statistics, AP Calculus, and AP English Literature and Composition. These courses are taught by AP-trained instructors.

CCA uses textbooks and academic resources from both Christian and secular publishers. Secondary English classes utilize textbooks from Houghton Mifflin Harcort. Elementary utilizes Scott Foresman language arts textbooks. "History Alive" textbooks are used in history classes across all levels. Math textbooks are also from Holt, Rinehart and Winston.

Students are taught the Bible during weekly chapel sessions as well as during required Bible courses. Teachers also integrate biblical concepts and a Christian worldview into their lessons. All teachers have BA or BS degrees, and many hold advanced degrees. Some electives offered at CCA include art, music, and yearbook.

== Enrollment ==
Approximately 200 students are enrolled in CCA. 50% are Panamanian citizens and 50% come from over twenty other countries including:

- Belgium
- Canada
- China
- Chile
- Colombia
- Costa Rica
- Dominican Republic
- Ecuador
- El Salvador
- Guatemala
- Honduras
- Italy
- Korea
- Mexico
- Netherlands
- Panama
- Philippines
- Romania
- Spain
- Switzerland
- United States of America
- Venezuela

== Tuition ==
CCA is a non-profit school that tries to keep costs low compared to many other private, international schools in the area. During the 2022-2023 school year, monthly tuition was $685 for Pre-K, $747 for elementary, $808 for middle school, and $873 for high school. There is also a one-time entrance fee of $5000 and a yearly registration fee of $650.

== Extracurricular activities ==
The main sports offered at CCA are basketball and volleyball in the fall, and soccer in the spring. CCA is a part of the Sport Association of Private Schools in Panama (ADECOP) and the Association of American Schools in Central America (AASCA). These Associations frequently schedule sports games and tournaments throughout the year. CCA's mascot is the Eagle.

Students also have the option of participating in teacher-organized dramas which happen via the initiative of individual teachers. Elementary students in the past have performed Jack and the Beanstalk and Cinderella. Secondary students have performed Hamlet (Spring 2005) and Arsenic and Old Lace (Spring 2007). Elementary students all participate in an annual Christmas musical presentation, and secondary students are invited to act in short drama skits in the Christmas presentation.
