= American School of Brasília =

- Escola Americana de Brasília
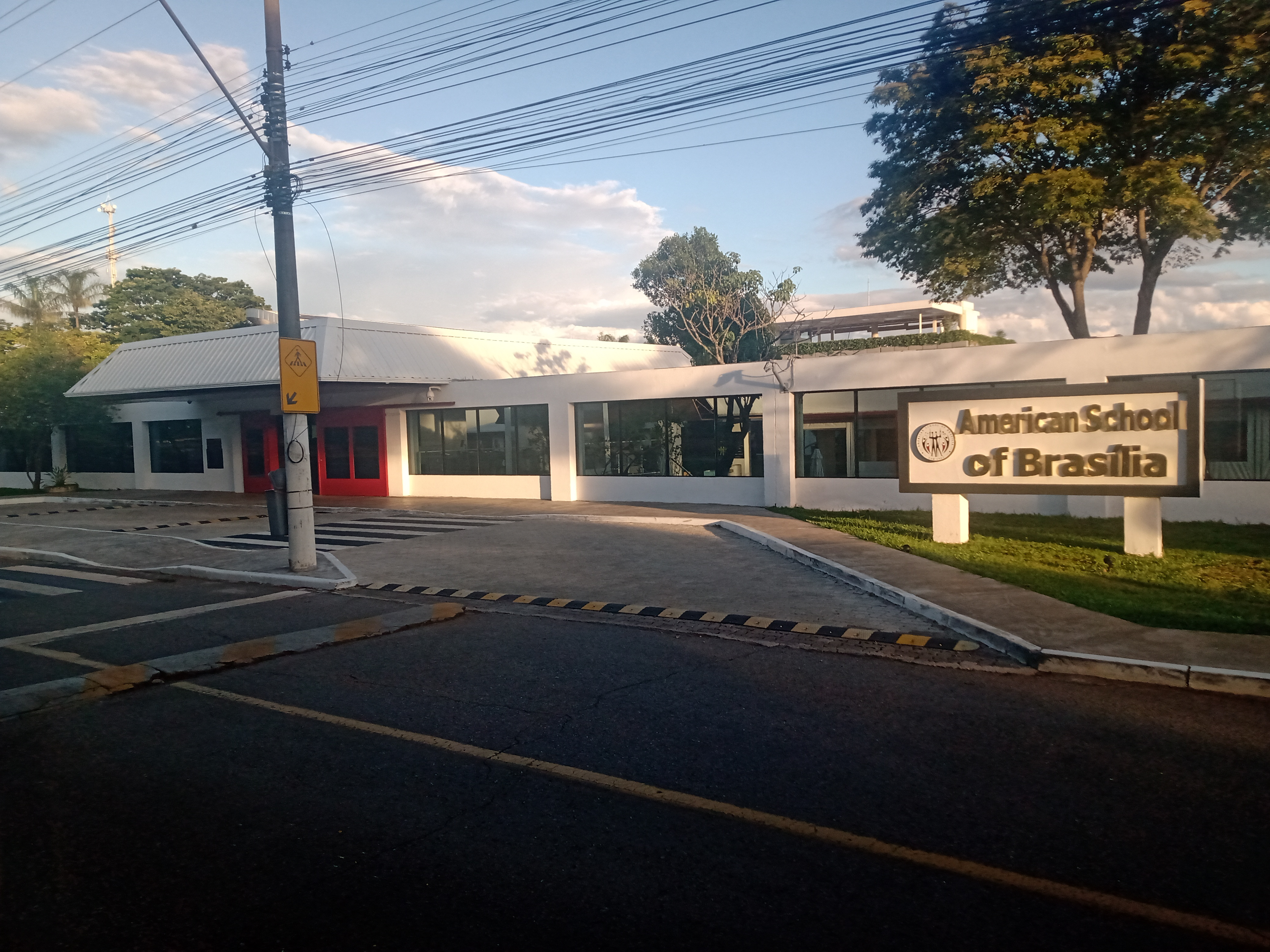

Location
- Brasília, DF; Brazil; 15°49′04″S 47°53′37″W

Information
- Type: Private school
- Motto: Learners inspiring learners to be inquisitive in life, principled in character, and bold in vision.
- Established: 1961
- CEEB code: 910042
- Faculty: 78 full-time teachers
- Grades: pre-K-12
- Enrollment: 699
- Campus size: 5 acres (20,000 m^{2})
- Campus type: Urban
- Colors: Black, red, white
- Athletics: Junior Varsity and Varsity Sports, Club EAB Sports for younger students
- Athletics conference: Big 4, Big 8, Little 8
- Mascot: Bull
- Nickname: Candangos, Bulls
- Neighborhood: Asa Sul
- Interim Head of School: Lesley Tait
- Website: www.eabdf.br

Escola Americana de Brasília (American School of Brasília or EAB) provides a US and Brazilian accredited pre-K through twelfth grade curriculum. EAB is an English-language school operated using American-style teaching. The school is open to students of all nationalities.

The school was founded in 1961, a year after Brazil's planned capital Brasília inauguration. It is a private, non-profit, coeducational, day school governed by a self-perpetuating Board of Directors. The U.S. Ambassador appoints one member. The school is administered by a headmaster, principals, and a director of Brazilian studies.

== Curriculum ==
The curriculum is college-preparatory. The school is accredited by the Brazilian Ministry of Education and the AdvancEd formerly known as the Southern Association of Colleges and Schools. The school is also an authorized IB International Baccalaureate World School. EAB awards the American diploma, the Brazilian diploma and the IB International Baccalaureate diploma.

In 2013-2014 EAB is home to 20 athletic teams and many more clubs, including Soccer, basketball, volleyball, softball, futsal (indoor soccer), Jazz Band, Model United Nations (MUN), Coding, Bulls Community Service, EAB Goes Green, and more.

EAB has a program called "1:1", referring to "one laptop to one student," which started on January 19, 2015.

== Demographics ==
The school is primarily split between Americans and Brazilians with each representing 20% and 60% of the student body respectively. The remaining 20% coming from several different nationalities. The World Fest, or Global Awareness Fair, is held in March. Students speak English, Portuguese, Arabic, Polish, Chinese, German, French, Spanish, Taiwanese, Thai, Hindi, Korean, and many other languages inside the campus.

== Facilities ==
The school is located on a 5-acre (20,000 m^{2}) campus in Asa Sul. The campus comprises interconnected buildings that house 45 classrooms, four science laboratories, four computer laboratories, a library, and a center for the arts (The Silvia Cançado center for the Arts). There is a soccer field, a gymnasium, an additional covered basketball court, a futsal (indoor soccer) court, and two elementary playgrounds. EAB has a full service snack bar, which is provided by Sodexo.

== See also ==
- Americans in Brazil
