= Colegio Karl C. Parrish =

Coordinates: 11.0184°N 74.8426°W

- Barranquilla; Colombia

Information
- Type: Independent
- Motto: Studiositas Quaerem Intellectum
- Established: 1938
- Director of school: Matthew Shannon
- Soccer coach: Yesid Piñeres
- Faculty: 130
- Grades: Preschool–12
- Enrollment: 784 total
- Student to teacher ratio: 19:1
- Campus: Suburban, 20 acres (0 km^{2})
- Colors: Green and white
- Website: www.kcparrish.edu.co

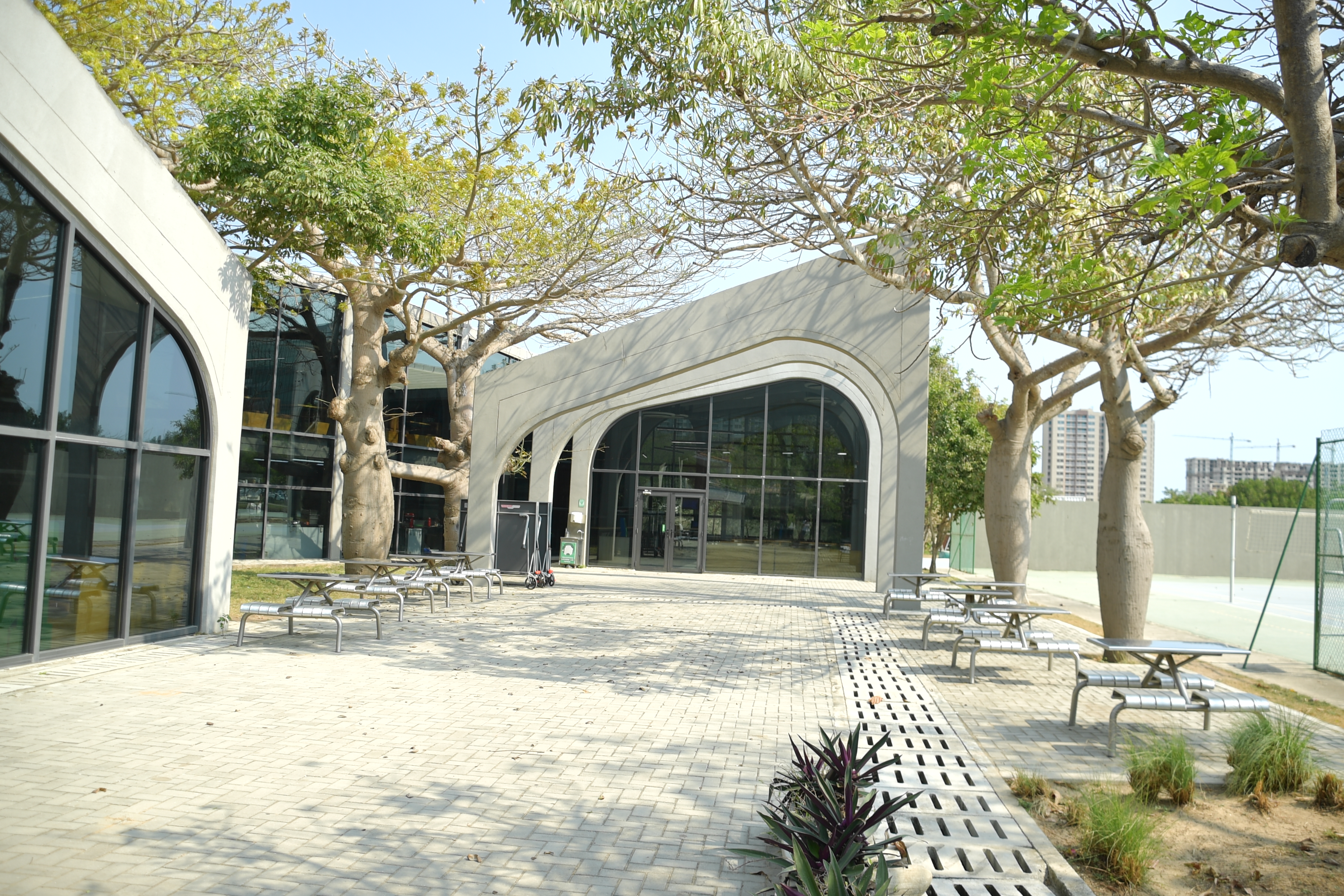
In 2020, KCP inaugurated the Student Center, a building that houses 360 students and offers a wide variety of healthy food and beverage options. But more than just a place to eat, the Student Center was designed to be a vibrant hub for studying, school events, spirit activities, friendships, and so much more.

Colegio Karl C. Parrish (also known as KCP) is a bilingual private school that offers Preschool through 12th-grade education. The school is located in Barranquilla, Colombia.

== Description ==
Colegio Karl C. Parrish was founded in 1938. It is accredited by the Colombian Ministerio de Educación Nacional and the US-based Southern Association of Colleges and Schools, now part of the Cognia-AdvancED accrediting agency. KCP is affiliated with international organizations such as the National Honor Society, Mu Alpha Theta, Model United Nations, and CharacterCounts!.

The school teaches a U.S college-preparatory curriculum. Students study for both the U.S High School Diploma and the Colombian Bachillerato Diploma. The school offers Advanced Placement courses. Pipi

== History ==
The school opened its doors for elementary students in 1938 as the result of an initiative by American and Colombian families to establish a school that could offer a United States-type education. They named the school after Karl Calvin Parrish, a civil engineer from Iowa lived in Barranquilla in the 1920s. The first director was Miss Miriam Best. The school has changed its location twice since its beginnings, once in 1946 and later in 1978 to its present site.

Dr. Burton B. Fox became director in 1964. The school became an internationally accredited school in 1966 by the Southern Association of Schools and Colleges – now an accreditation division of AdvancED now Cognia – and still holds that status. The first class of seniors graduated in 1967.

In 1998, the KCP Preschool adopted a Reggio Emilia approach – a specially designed project-based learning environment for preschoolers. It was the first school in Colombia to have this program.

== Facilities ==
KCP's campus spans over 3 hectares.

KCP's library, named in honor of Burton B. Fox, is a two-story building added in 1984 and was renovated in 2011. The Burton B. Fox Library contains over 22,000 items and subscribes to hundreds of academic databases. It also houses the Preschool Library, the result of a Reggio Emilia project undertaken by Kinder students in 2001.

A swimming pool and gymnasium were built in 1987. In 1998 the Alumni Hall Auditorium was inaugurated as an addition to the Fine Arts program. It seats 465. 2014 saw the inauguration of a modern Gross Motor / Atelier building and Park for the Preschool. In 2020, KCP inaugurated the Student Center, a building that houses 360 students and offers a wide variety of healthy food and beverage options. But more than just a place to eat, the Student Center was designed to be a vibrant hub for studying, school events, spirit activities, friendships, and so much more.

The Brown House holds the Director's office and the Board Room was built by Dr. Fox in 1970.

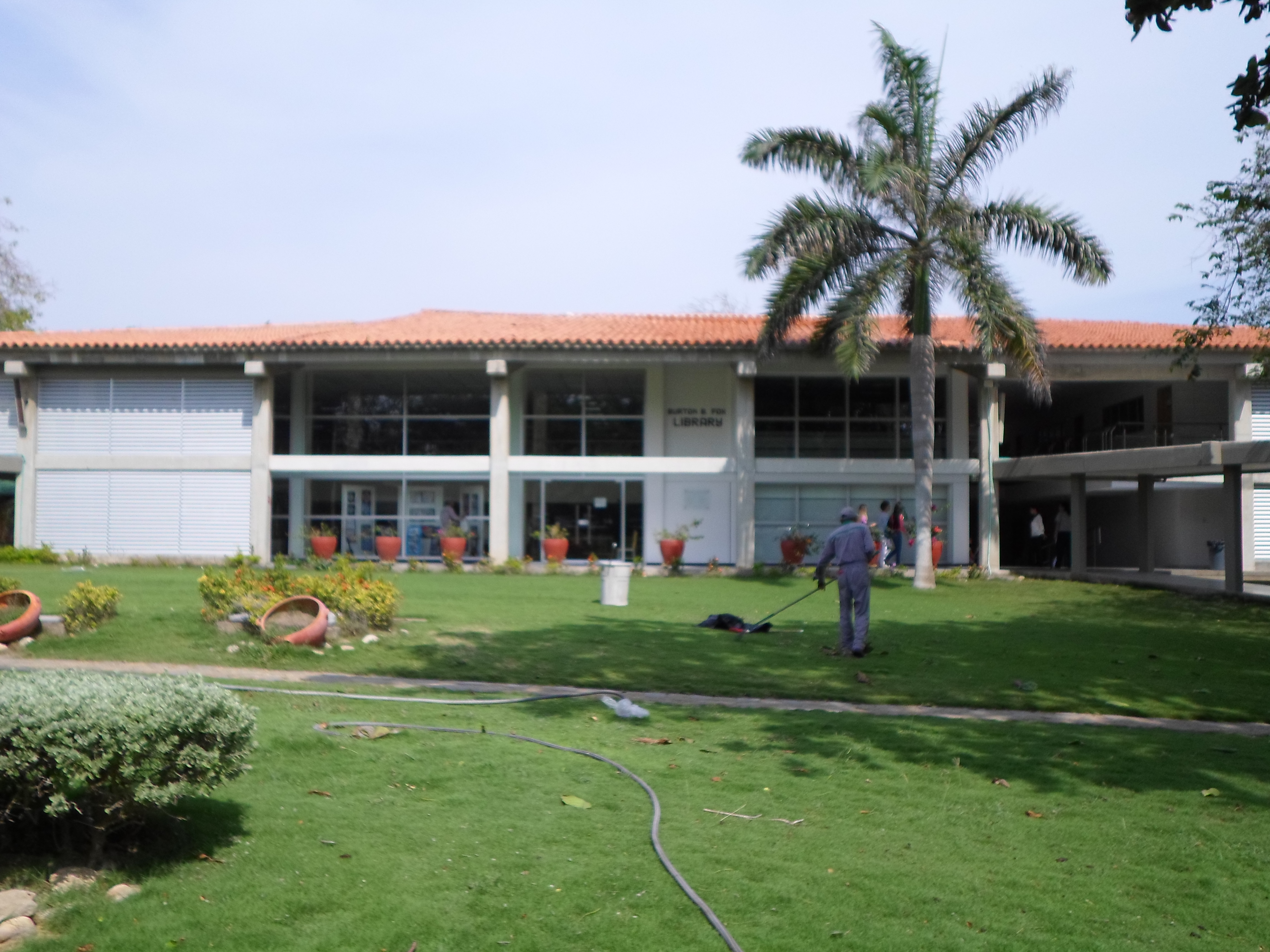
Burton B. Fox Library. Renovated in 2012, it is the hub of academic learning at KCP.

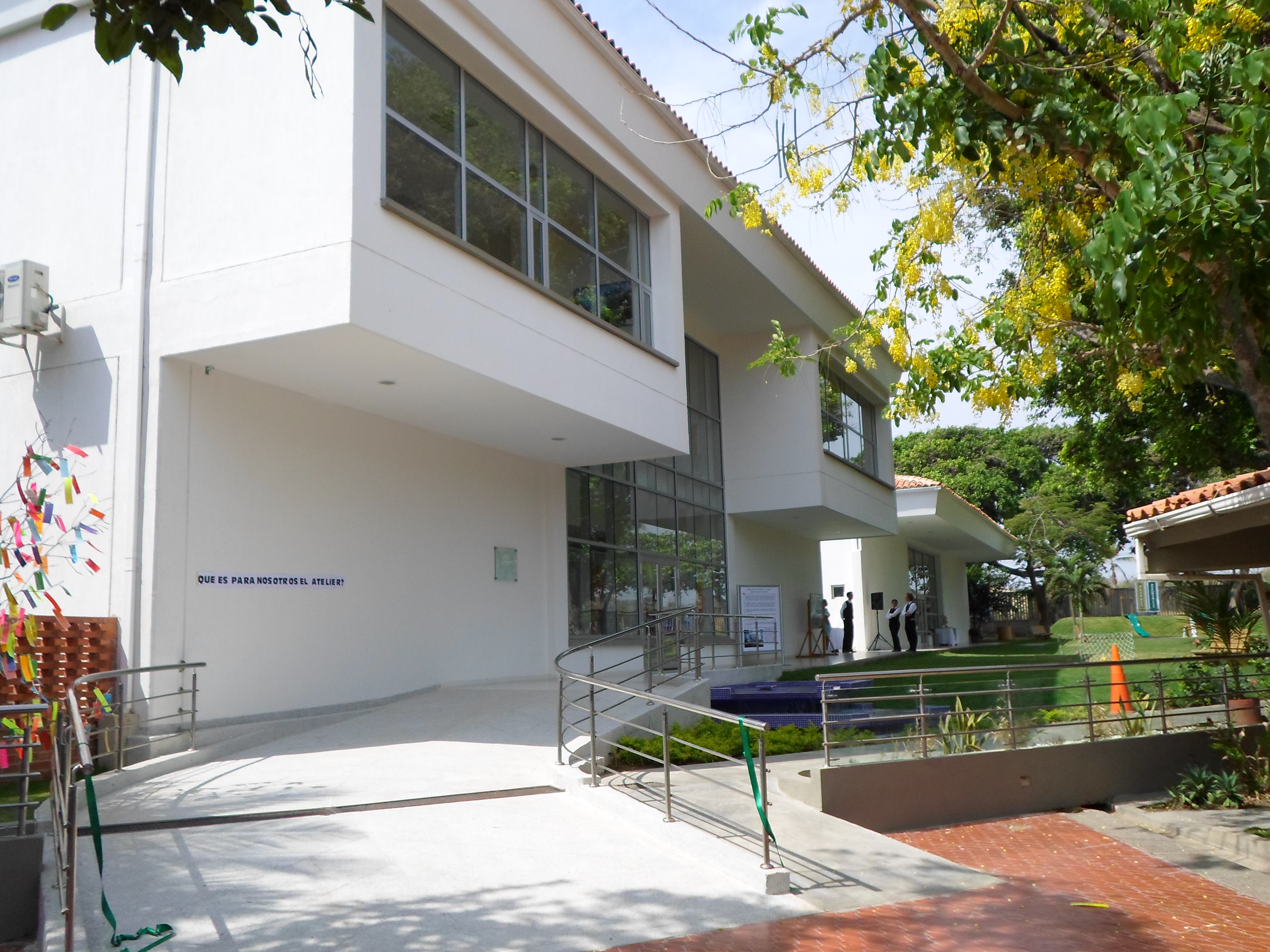
Atelier and Gross Motor Building. Built-in 2014, this building includes an atelier, technology exploration center, and Gross Motor facilities.

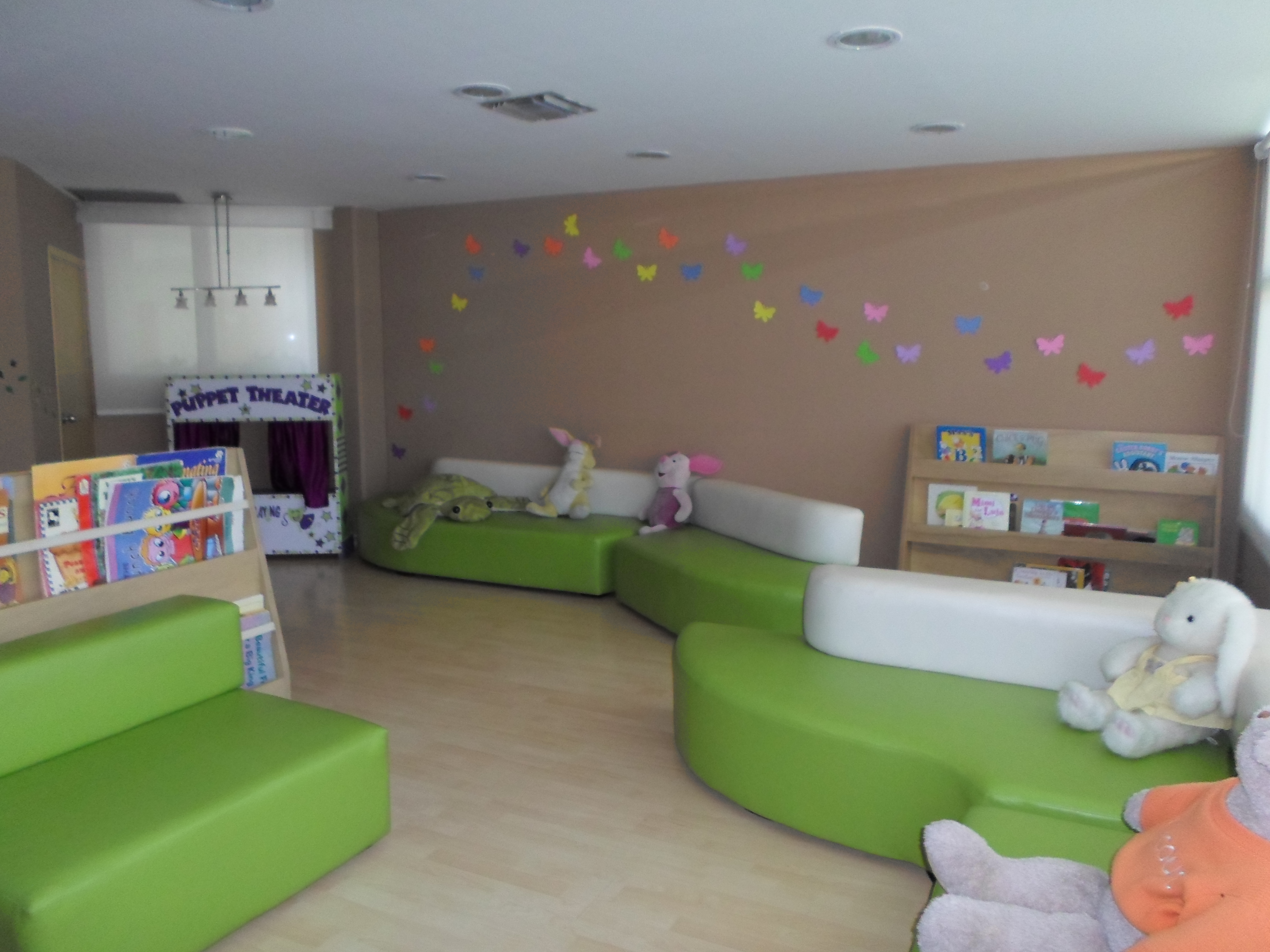
Preschool Library. Designed by KCP Preschool students as a result of the Reggio Emilia program.

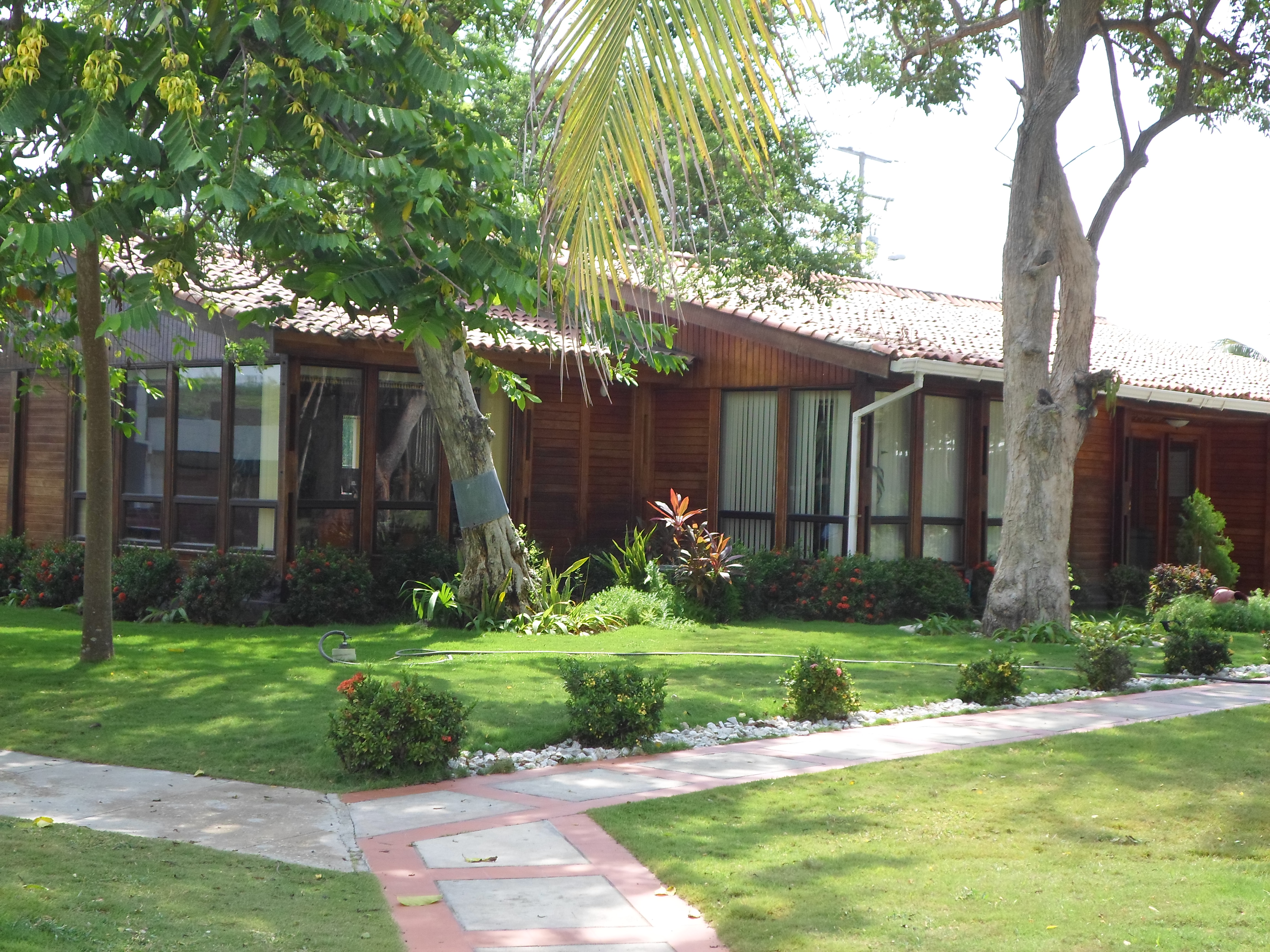
The Brown House at KCP. Director's Office
