= International School of Monagas =

School in Venezuela

The International School of Monagas, which is also known as ISM is located in Maturín, the capital of Monagas State, Venezuela. It is next to the housing complex and Country club San Miguel.

== Students ==
ISM has over 180 students, most of them local, but the rest are from other countries like: U.S., Brazil, Argentina, Peru, Colombia, Canada, Lebanon, Syria, Bolivia, Ecuador, Mexico, Spain, and Chile.

The staff consist of a wide variety of teachers, maintenance staff, and administrators.

== Extra Curricular ==
ISM offers participation in events such as Model United Nations, EVAC and VANAS tournaments for basketball, soccer and volleyball, school band, and karate
