= Pan American School of Porto Alegre =

Brazilian international school

- Petrópolis, Porto Alegre, Rio Grande do Sul; Brazil

Information
- School type: International School
- Established: 1966; 60 years ago
- Head of school: Ms. Shaysann Kaun
- Grades: Preschool - Grade 12
- Enrollment: 400 (2018)
- Language: English; Portuguese

Pan American School of Porto Alegre is an American international school in Petrópolis, Porto Alegre, Brazil. The private not-for-profit educational establishment teaches preschool through grade 12 in both Portuguese and English. It was established in 1966. Since then it has grown into an educational institute offering three programs:

1. Primary Years Program (PYP)
2. Middle Years Program (MYP)
3. AP Capstone Program

In 2007 it moved to a new campus. As of 2014 it had 392 students, with 72% of them being solely Brazilian citizens, 19% holding a single citizenship from another country, and 9% having two or more citizenships. In 2018 the number of students had increased to 400.

From July 2021, Ms. Shaysann Kaun Faria replaced Mr. Jeffrey Michael Jurkovac as Head of School.

== See also ==
- Americans in Brazil
