= Colegio Jorge Washington =

International school in Cartagena, Colombia

Coordinates: 10.5442°N 75.4614°W

Colegio Jorge Washington (COJOWA), previously the George Washington School, is an international school located in Cartagena, Colombia, with a main campus in Zona Norte and a preschool campus in Bocagrande. The school serves preschool through 12th Grade and students may qualify for a U.S. high school diploma and/or for a Colombian one.

== History ==
The school was founded in August 1952, and classes began on October 1 that year. Initially the school enrolled 25 students, taught by 3 teachers. The school occupied a campus on Second Avenue in Bocagrande until a new building opened in 1963; the United States federal government donated $923,000 while citizens and industrialists from inside and outside Colombia donated $935,000. The Colombian Ministry of Education approved classes until the 9th grade in 1968, with middle school approval in 1970, and then all grade levels in 1974. The preschool program began in 1979, the same year as the first junior high school graduation.

== Campus ==
The main campus has three self-contained wings for elementary school, middle school, and high school. The pre-school campus is located on a different location, in Bocagrande.
