= American International School of Bolivia =

School in Bolivia

Coordinates: 17.355622°S 66.201762°W

American International School of Bolivia Spanish: Colegio Americano Internacional de Bolivia

Location
- Cochabamba; Bolivia

Information
- School type: International School
- Established: 1993; 32 years ago
- Grades: Pre-Kindergarten - Grade 12
- Language: English; Spanish
- Website: https://www.aisb.edu.bo/eng.html

American International School of Bolivia (AIS/B, Spanish: Colegio Americano Internacional de Bolivia) is an American international school in Cochabamba, Bolivia. It serves grades Pre-Kindergarten–12.

== History ==
The school was founded in 1993.

== Languages ==
The school teaches in English and Spanish and also teaches Quechua as an additional national language. French and Mandarin are offered as optional subjects.
