= International School of Curitiba =

Location
- Curitiba, Paraná; Brazil; 25.36965°S 49.32640°W

Information
- Established: 1959; 67 years ago
- Website: https://iscbrazil.com/

The International School of Curitiba (ISC), founded in 1959, is located in Curitiba, Paraná, Brazil.

== Diplomas ==
American ISC has been accredited since 1984 by AdvancED, the leading American Certification Authority for excellent education development with more than 100 years of experience and active in 70 countries. The core curriculum, texts, supplementary materials, and teachers are similar in quality to the K-12 educational system in the United States. The main curriculum at all levels includes Language, Arts, Literature, Math, Science, Social Studies, Modern Languages, Information Technology, Physical Education, and Health.

Brazilian ISC is accredited by MEC as a Brazilian school until Grade 12 and all students are required to use the Brazilian components of the curriculum. Language, Literature, History of Brazil, and Brazilian Geography classes are taught in Portuguese. The other areas of knowledge are included in the American program.

International Baccalaureate (IB) The school also offers the International Baccalaureate Diploma Program (IBDP), an intensive and challenging program designed for 11th and 12th-graded students. The IBDP is recognized around the world as a high school qualification for students planning to attend a university on the European continent. As a result of successful completion, students can obtain permanent college credits.

The US diploma is mandatory for all students; the Brazilian diploma is mandatory for all Brazilian citizens, and the IB diploma is optional.

== Early Childhood Center (ECC 1 through Kindergarten) ==
In the Early Childhood Center (ECC), children find a place where they are subject to their own experiences and are able to develop emotional and conceptual understanding through experimentation, research and the transformation of the space around them.

In this way, inspired by the educational approach of Reggio Emilia schools, teachers listen to the students and propose the development of long-term projects, in which they are protagonists of their learning. This allows children to take initiatives and feel encouraged to learn and explore the world around them.

== Elementary School (Grades 1 through 5) ==
Elementary School engage students in active learning to develop learners' skills as well as habits related to character and citizenship.

The approach to literacy is based on the Reader's and Writer's Workshop, a customized methodology for international schools in which students in grades 5 through 8 apply learning in a meaningful way. In addition, other subjects are taught by hands-on projects that develop in the student the curiosity and the proactivity in relation to the learning process itself.

== Middle School (Grades 6 through 8) ==
Middle School is based on interdisciplinary collaboration, in which different disciplines work together on the same subject. This integration aims to stimulate ethics, independent and enduring learning, critical thinking, and decision-making skills that prepare students for the next phase, High School.

Students continue to apply Reader's and Writer's Workshop practices in English classes, and use the United Nations Sustainable Development Goals for the Social Studies curriculum. In Grade 6, they are introduced to Service Learning activities. Middle School also focuses on social and emotional learning through the Advisory Program.

== High School (Grades 9 through 12) ==
High School is focused on the student's experience, which plays a key role in their own learning process. The 21st Century Classroom and the Blended Learning concept are examples of teaching methodologies that promote the development of social skills such as teamwork, collaboration and leadership, as well as personal skills such as critical thinking, logical reasoning applied to problem solving and a globalized perspective.

Service Learning activities continue to be developed as well as the use of the UN Sustainable Development Goals in Social Studies. The development of social and emotional learning is accomplished through the 360 Wildcat Program.

Middle and High School also have Robotics, Programming, Digital Arts, Audiovisual Production and Music Production classes. In Arts, there is Choir, Band, Theater and Visual Arts. There are also more than 20 Personalized Learning activities, including French, Cooking, Climbing and Independent Exploitation.

== Extracurricular program ==
After classes, ISC offers more than 100 extracurricular activities through the ISC Academy, a program designed to provide students of all ages with sports, arts and academic activities with free and paid options.

For parents and staff, ISC offers the Wildcat Wellness Program with free activities such as yoga, zumba, French and English classes.

ISC is equipped with an Arena. There is a dance room, music room, art room, climbing wall, work out area and two basketball, volleyball, and futsal courts.

== See also ==
- Americans in Brazil
- Reggio Emilia approach
