= Ananindeua, Pará =

Municipality in Pará, Brazil

Ananindeua
- City
- The City of Ananindeua
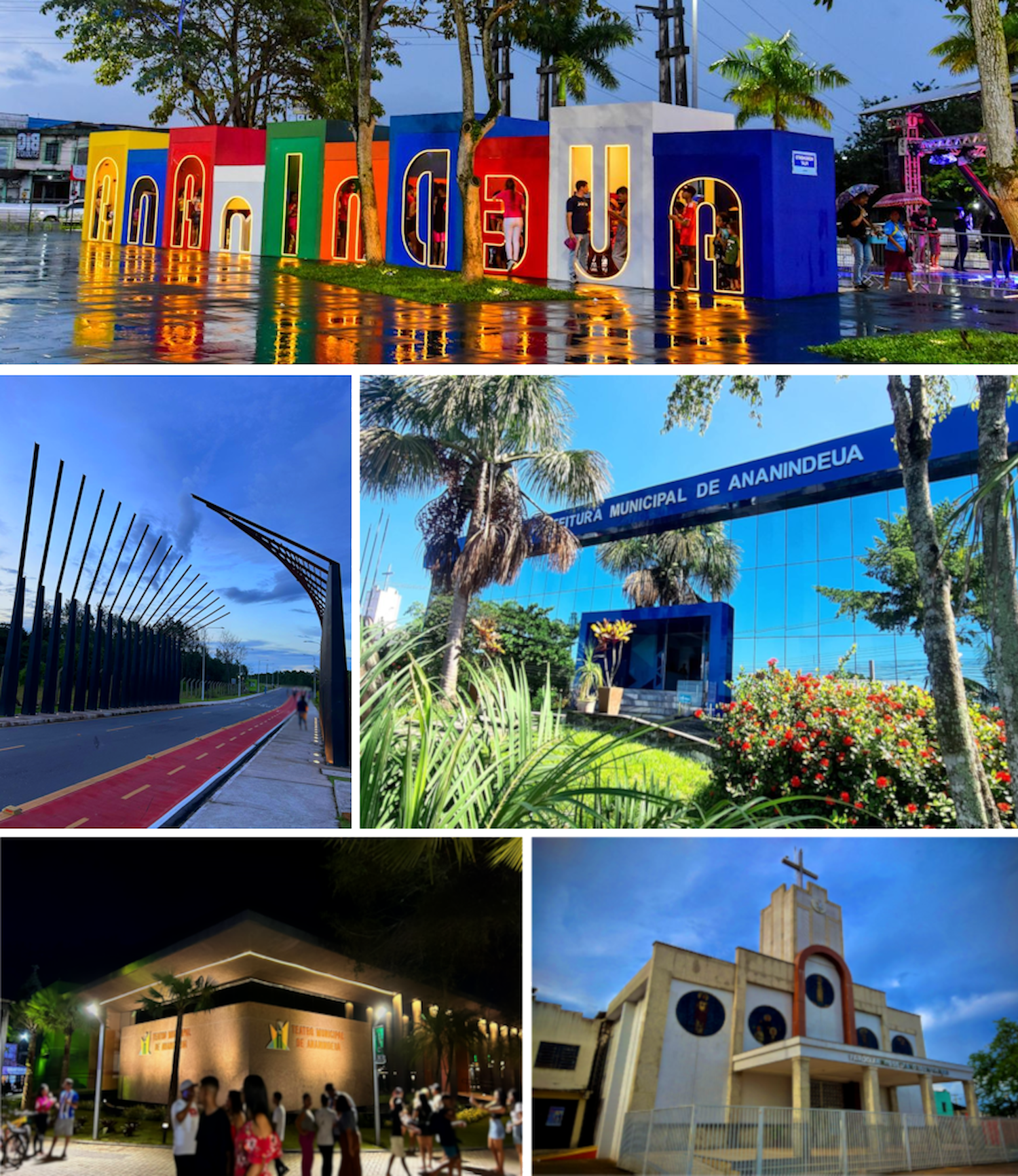

- Flag Coat of arms

- Location in the State of Pará

- Localization in Brazil
- Coordinates: 01°21′57″S 48°22′19″W
- Country: Brazil
- Region: North
- State: Pará
- Founded: January 3, 1944

Government
  - Mayor: Hugo Atayde (PODEMOS)

Area
  - Total: 185.057 km^{2} (71.451 sq mi)
- Elevation: 20 m (66 ft)

Population (2020)
  - Total: 535,547
  - Density: 2,893.96/km^{2} (7,495.31/sq mi)
- Time zone: UTC−3 (BRT)
- Postal code: 67000-000
- Area code: 091
- Website: https://www.ananindeua.pa.gov.br/

Ananindeua (Portuguese pronunciation: [ananĩˈdewɐ]) is the second largest city in Pará, northern Brazil, and the third largest city in the Brazilian Amazon region. It is a part of the Metropolitan Region of Belém,. It has a population of 535,547 according to the last estimation of 2020, done by the Brazilian Statistic and Geography Institute (IBGE).

The municipality contains 1% of the Utinga State Park, created in 1993 to protect the metropolitan area's water supply.

== Education ==
Amazon Valley Academy and College of Amazon are located in this city.

== Sport ==
Clube Municipal Ananindeua represents the city.

== See also ==
- List of municipalities in Pará
- List of quilombola communities in Pará
