= American International School of Kingston =

School in Kingston, Jamaica

Coordinates: 18.020166°N 76.757656°W

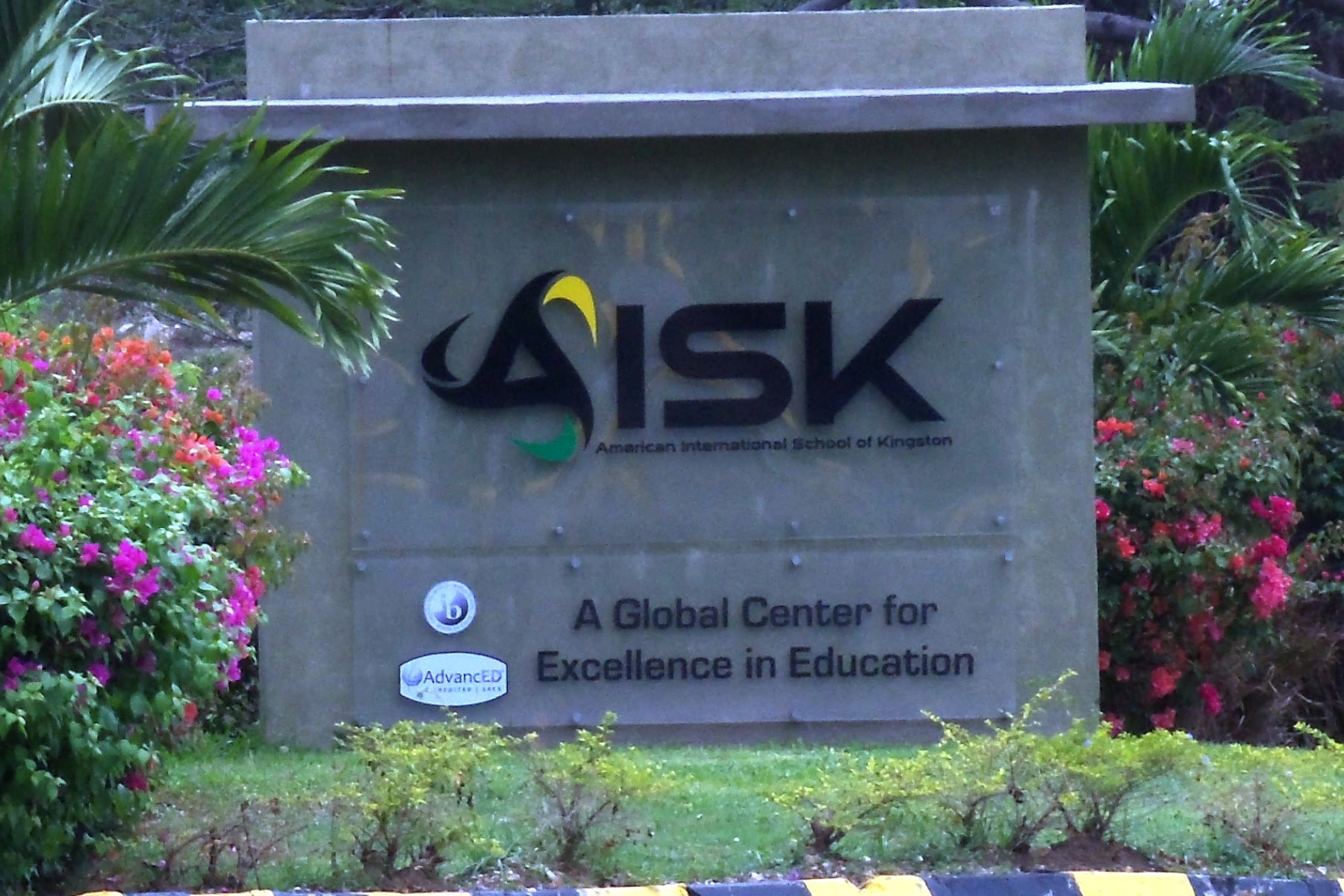
- Kingston; Jamaica

Information
- Established: 1994; 32 years ago
- Teaching staff: 47
- Gender: Mixed
- Enrollment: 298 (2017–2018)
- Language: English

American International School of Kingston (AISK) is an American international school located on College Green Avenue in Kingston, Jamaica. It is a private day school that is open to both male and female students of all nationalities. The school is governed by a 9 member Board of Trustees and its mascot is a hurricane.

== History ==
The school opened in September 1994 with 27 students enrolled in grades kindergarten through five, taught by teachers, and grades six through twelve being correspondence courses. The Southern Association of Colleges and Schools accredited the school in the 2001–2002 school year. As time passed more correspondence classes were replaced by teacher-led classes. The current campus opened in August 2009 and is the only school in Kingston to offer boarding facilities.

== Curriculum ==
AISK is a college-preparatory school with the intent to send graduates to post-secondary studies in the United States, Canada, and Europe. Classes are taught in English, and English-as-a-second-language is available to be taught to elementary grades. There are elementary school, middle school, and high school programs. The International Baccalaureate Diploma Program is offered for students in grades 11 and 12. A focus is placed on developing physical literacy by engaging students in age-appropriate physical education programs. Varsity sports are also offered to help students specialize skills and knowledge.

== Arts ==
Various arts programs are available to enrolled students, such as:

- Visual Arts
- Dance
- Drama
- National Talent Show - JCDC Festival of the Visual and Performing Arts Competition

== Enrollment ==
As of the 2017–2018 school year, there are 47 members of the faculty and 298 students. A Board of Trustees governs the organization of the school.

== Awards ==
In 2018, three female students entered a team submission in the Jamaica Solar Challenge and won second place. They were presented an award of $40,000 (US$300).
