= New Texas =

Colony in São Paulo state

Coordinates: 23.720°S 46.649°W

The official flag of the Confederate States of America in 1865, the year New Texas was established.

New Texas (Portuguese: Novo Texas) was a colony established in São Paulo state, Brazil by former Confederates after their surrender as a result of the American Civil War. The New Texas colony's manager was Frank McMullen.

== Background ==
After the end of the American Civil War, many former Confederates desired to flee the re-unified United States of America. This desire was caused by resentment towards and perceived oppression by the federal government, along with a conviction that the economic and political conditions of the South would be slow to improve during the era of Reconstruction. For some, they chose to flee to another country in hopes of preserving their former way of life, including slavery, but as immigration was an expensive action, not all were able to participate. In addition to this, several Confederate officials (including General Robert E. Lee) discouraged individuals from leaving the country. One popular destination for these displaced citizens was Brazil due to the fact slavery was still legal, resulting in as many as 20,000 people emigrating from the South.

== Initial settlement ==
In 1865, Frank McMullen left for Brazil with 154 former citizens of the Confederacy in hopes of starting a successful colony. They were hoping to take advantage of the lax immigration laws of Brazil at the time. The Emperor of Brazil at the time, Dom Pedro II, actively encouraged Confederate immigration; there were efforts to provide financial assistance and land to the incoming Southerners. McMullen decided to start his settlement on a 50 square-leagues plot of land South of São Paulo, leading to the official foundation of New Texas.

== See also ==
- Americans in Brazil
- Confederados
- Confederate colonies
