= Escuela Bella Vista =

American international school in Maracaibo, Venezuela

- Maracaibo; Venezuela

Information
- Grades: Preschool - Grade 12
- Enrollment: 300
- Website: https://www.ebv.org.ve/

Escuela Bella Vista, more commonly known as EBV, is a school located in Maracaibo, Venezuela. The school currently enrolls 300 students, covers from Pre-School to grade 12 and offers the International Baccalaureate (IB) program to its students, as well as the possibility of attending Florida Virtual School. Even though the school used to enroll more than 600 students, after the strikes held toward Hugo Chávez government in December 2002, many American students fled from the city, and the school lost many of its international students. Currently, most students are from Venezuela. The current principals are Jakob Bills (elementary school) and Peter O’Reilly (secondary school).

Students in the high school follow a U.S.-based curriculum, which culminates in the International Baccalaureate Program in grades 11 and 12.

== EBV High School Student Council ==
The EBV High School Student Council (StuCo) is a student-led organization to promote the interests of students among the school administration, faculty and parents. Students on the student council serve as representatives and role models for the school by adhering to the school citizenship code. Members of StuCo identify and propose changes to the school administration to improve the quality of life at school for the students. In addition, students organize and promote school educational and recreational activities for school spirits, such as bi-weekly assemblies, family fun nights, and non-uniform days.

== Athletics ==
Elementary Activities

- Soccer
- Basketball
- Karate
- Gymnastics
- Tennis
- Jump Rope Club

Competition in local leagues Middle School

- Soccer
- Basketball
- Gymnastics
- Cheerleading
- Tennis
- Volleyball
- Softball

High School

- Soccer
- Basketball
- Tennis
- Volleyball
- Softball
