= American School of Rio de Janeiro =

Escola Americana do Rio de Janeiro

Location
- Rio de Janeiro; Brazil; 22°59′2.56″S 43°14′40.82″W

Information
- Type: Private
- Motto: Find Your Path
- Established: 1937
- CEEB code: 910450
- Head of school: Dr. Steve Desroches
- Faculty: 236 faculty members
- Grades: Nursery - 12
- Enrollment: 1352
- Campus size: Gávea 360 acres (1,500,000 m^{2}) Barra 4 acres (16,000 m^{2})
- Campus type: Urban
- Colors: Blue and red
- Athletics: Soccer, Basketball, Cheerleading, Volleyball, Track, Softball
- Athletics conference: Big 8, Little 8, Final Four (Boys Basketball 2022)
- Mascot: Black Panther
- Nickname: Panthers
- Neighborhood: Gávea and Barra da Tijuca
- Website: www.earj.com.br

The American School of Rio de Janeiro (Brazilian Portuguese: Escola Americana do Rio de Janeiro, EARJ) is a non-profit twin-campus IB World Continuum school located in Rio de Janeiro, Brazil. The school was founded in 1937 as a private, independent, coeducational, non-denominational day school. EARJ offers an educational program from Nursery through Grade 12 for students of all nationalities. In 2023-24, enrollment was 1,352 students across the Gávea and Barra campuses with 236 members of teaching faculty.

== Curriculum and programs ==
The curriculum is that of a U.S. college-preparatory independent day school for students from pre-school through Grade 12. Instruction is in English, with Portuguese offered as an additional first or foreign language.

The Lower School curriculum is the following:

- Mathematics
- English Language
  - English Academic Language Program
- Portuguese Language
- Science
- Social Studies
- The Arts
  - Visual Arts
  - Music
  - MakerSpace
- Personal, Social, Emotional Health
  - Active Living
  - Identity and Interaction: Guidance and Counseling
- Physical Education

The Upper School standard curriculum is the following:

- English Language
- Social Studies
- Mathematics
- Sciences
- Foreign Languages
- Physical Education
- Technology & Creative Arts
- Electives
- Portuguese Language (Brazilian Diploma)
- Brazilian Studies (Brazilian Diploma)The school offers the American, Brazilian and International Baccalaureate Diplomas, and is affiliated with the International Baccalaureate Organization, with its curriculum following the Primary Years (IB PYP), Middle Years (IB MYP) and Diploma Programmes (IB DP).

The Diploma Programme curriculum is the following:

- Group 1: Studies in Language and Literature (English/Portuguese)
- Group 2: Language Acquisition (Portuguese/French/Spanish)
- Group 3: Individuals and Societies (History/Economics/Global Politics/Brazilian Studies)
- Group 4: Experimental Sciences (Biology/Chemistry/Physics)
- Group 5: Mathematics
- Group 6: The Arts (Visual Arts)
- Core: Creativity, Activity, Service (CAS), Extended Essay (EE) and Theory of Knowledge (ToK)

Over 98% of the school's graduates enroll in a college or university, with 48% of them going on to a higher learning institution in the U.S., 44.5% going on to a higher learning institution in Europe, Canada, Latin America and Asia and 7.5% enroll in universities in Brazil.

Available foreign languages include French and Spanish. Health, physical education, and computer classes are also run. There is no religious instruction.

The school is accredited by AdvancED and is the only school in the State of Rio de Janeiro to be designated by license as an international school, recognized by the Brazilian Ministry of Education and the Secretary of Education for the State of Rio de Janeiro.

=== Extracurricular activities ===
Music, art, band, choir, drama, publications, service clubs and athletics are among the extracurricular activities offered. There are chapters of the National Honor Society, the Spanish Honor Society, French Honor Society and Mu Alpha Theta on campus.

EARJ sports teams compete against other schools in the Association of American Schools in Brazil (AASB) in soccer, basketball, volleyball, softball, futsal, running, and cheerleading and dance. The academic teams compete in interscholastic events such as Knowledge Bowl, Destination Imagination, MATHCOUNTS and several Model UN conferences.

== Campuses and facilities ==
The Gávea campus opened in 1971 and features eight towers in a 12-acre site. It is located at the edge of Tijuca National Forest, offering a scenic view of landmarks such as Rodrigo de Freitas Lagoon, Guanabara Bay, Sugar Loaf, and Christ the Redeemer.

In addition, the Gávea campus has libraries, a gymnasium, a MakerSpace laboratory, music rooms, a cafeteria, an infirmary, snack bar, student store, security room, and a 350-seat auditorium. Athletic facilities include a Lower School playground, indoor and outdoor courts, and a playing field.

The Barra Campus was established in 2014, located in the heart of Barra da Tijuca neighborhood, surrounded by a residential area. It has a state-of-the-art 4 acres building to accommodate its community, with facilities that include playgrounds, outdoor learning areas, specialized rooms for music, art and design, a MakerSpace laboratory, indoor and outdoor courts, libraries, a cafeteria, the snack shack and a field.

== Athletics ==
Students have the opportunity to participate in several interscholastic competitions representing the EARJ Panthers. Along with a few other local competitions which vary through different sports, EARJ participates in Big 8, Little 10 and Final Four Tournaments.

The EARJ Varsity Boys Basketball and the EARJ Varsity Girls Volleyball teams are the reigning Big 8 champions, with the Basketball team having back-to-back championships in the 22-23 and 23–24 seasons and the AASB Final Four title.

At the Little 10, the Panthers secured gold with the Junior Varsity Girls Soccer, Junior Varsity Cheerleading and Junior Varsity Co-ed Softball teams.

The U10 Co-ed Soccer team were the champions of the 2024 USA Cup.

== Community and culture ==
EARJ is a multicultural school, with families from around 50 different nationalities. Its community is engaged with events to celebrate its cultural diversity, the biggest of them being the International Day. Other traditional events include Halloween and the Walkathon Against Cancer, which is a walk at Lagoa Rodrigo de Freitas to raise awareness for cancer prevention and treatment, and also raise funds on behalf of oncology patients and the National Cancer Institute (INCA).

The school has an active Parent Teacher Association (PTA), whose main purpose is to work collaboratively with the school administration for the benefit of the EARJ community.

== Notable alumni ==
- Cléo Pires
- Giulia Be
- João Fonseca
- Jordana Brewster
- Jorge Paulo Lemann
- Sasha Meneghel
