= Graded School =

Graded - The American School of São Paulo
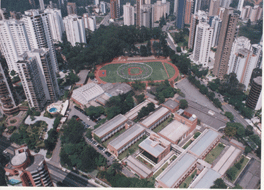

Location
- São Paulo, São Paulo; Brazil
- Coordinates: 23.620°S 46.734°W

Information
- Type: International School
- Established: October 17, 1920
- Superintendent: Jane McGee
- CEEB code: 910650
- Principal (High School): Bryan Bordelon
- Principal (Middle School): Robert Switzer
- Principal (Lower School): Ana Allen
- Faculty: 175 (2023)
- Grades: P-12
- Enrollment: 1,315 (2023)
- Campus size: 16.5 acres (6.7 ha)
- Campus type: Urban
- Colors: Red, White, Blue, Grey
- Mascot: Eagle
- Website: www.graded.br

Associação Escola Graduada de São Paulo, most commonly referred to as Graded School or Graded, is an American school in São Paulo, Brazil. The school opened on October 17, 1920, in a small schoolhouse on Avenida São João, and in 1961 the current campus was built on Avenida Giovanni Gronchi, in a terrain now facing Paraisópolis, located in Morumbi.

== Overview ==
The school offers education from pre-primary to high school, all offering American-style teaching. The Lower School consists of the Montessori P pre-primary program (three years old through Kindergarten). The high school also offers an International Baccalaureate (IB) diploma and a Brazilian diploma, in addition to the mandatory SACS-accredited American diploma. There are two Advanced Placement courses available: AP Calculus AB and BC. The majority of classes are taught in English, but the school does offer classes in Portuguese, French, and Spanish. Graded's high school offers two to three levels of maths sets per year. The school has 90 classrooms, eight computer labs, an auditorium, an infirmary, two soccer fields, two covered play areas, two gyms, and four science labs. The libraries contain over 50,000 volumes. All graduates receive an American high school diploma.

In 2006, the school finished the construction of an arts center. It is a large structure with two floors, but standing as high as a six-floor building. The first floor houses music and theater activities, with an orchestra room, a band room, six practice rooms (two of which contain pianos, and one an electric drum set), a dance studio, a media center for editing film and music, and a black box theater. The second floor is dedicated to the visual arts, and contains several rooms for ceramics, painting, and drawing. The second floor also has a photography room, complete with its own developing facilities.

In 2010, the Graded Campus Project was developed. In February 2014, Phase I of the project was completed, with a full renovation of the Lower School Playgrounds and Gymnasiums. In March 2017, Phase II of the Graded Campus Project was inaugurated. It included a new Main Entrance, Parking Garage, Student Center, Large Field, Small Field, Track, Beach Volleyball Court, Wellness Gymnasium, and Maintenance Building.

Traditionally more than 95% of the school's graduating class enrolls in a 4-year degree education within one year of graduation.

== Accreditation ==
Accredited by the Brazilian Ministry of Education. Graded is an IB World School, authorized by the International Baccalaureate Organization (IBO). The school is a member of the American International Schools in the Americas (AMISA), the US National Association of Independent Schools (NAIS), the Council of International Schools (CIS), and the American Montessori Society. Graded is also a registered examination center for the International Baccalaureate (IB), all College Board exams (the SAT, SSAT, PSAT), and the ACT.

== See also ==
- Americans in Brazil
