= Schools offering International Baccalaureate =

According to the IB's "Find a World School" list, as of July 2026 there are over 6234 schools offering one or more IB programmes. But only 95 that include all programs including the MYP eAssessment.
Notable examples include:

== Africa ==
=== Eswatini ===
- Waterford Kamhlaba United World College of Southern Africa

=== Ethiopia ===
- International Community School of Addis Ababa

=== Ghana ===
- SOS-Hermann Gmeiner International College
- Tema International School

=== Kenya ===
- International School of Kenya
- St. Mary's School, Nairobi

=== Malawi ===
- Bishop Mackenzie International School

=== Mauritius ===
- Le Bocage International School

=== Mozambique ===
- American International School of Mozambique

=== Senegal ===
- International School of Dakar

=== South Africa ===
- American International School of Johannesburg
- Redhill School

=== Tanzania ===
- International School of Tanganyika
- United World College East Africa

=== Zambia ===
- International School of Lusaka

=== Zimbabwe ===
- Harare International School

== Asia ==
=== Armenia ===
- United World College Dilijan

=== Bangladesh ===
- Aga Khan School, Dhaka
- American International School of Dhaka
- International School Dhaka

=== Brunei ===
- Jerudong International School
- International School Brunei

=== Cambodia ===
- Northbridge International School Cambodia
- International School of Phnom Penh

=== China ===
- American International School of Guangzhou
- British International School Shanghai
- British School of Beijing
- Canadian International School of Beijing
- Dingwen Academy Hangzhou
- Dulwich College Shanghai
- Guangdong Country Garden School
- High School Attached to Northeast Normal University
- International School of Beijing
- International School of Dongguan
- International School of Tianjin
- Léman International School - Chengdu
- Nanjing International School
- Nord Anglia International School Shanghai Pudong
- Qingdao Amerasia International School
- Shanghai American School
- Shanghai Community International School
- Shanghai Singapore International School
- Western Academy of Beijing
- Yew Chung International School of Shanghai
- Beijing World Youth Academy

=== Hong Kong ===
- Australian International School Hong Kong
- Canadian International School of Hong Kong
- Chinese International School
- Christian Alliance International School
- Creative Secondary School
- Diocesan Boys' School
- Discovery College
- Delia Memorial School (Glee Path)
- ELCHK Lutheran Academy
- German Swiss International School
- Hong Kong Academy
- Hong Kong International School
- Hong Kong Chinese Christian Churches Union Logos Academy
- Independent Schools Foundation Academy
- International College Hong Kong
- Island School
- King George V School, Hong Kong
- Li Po Chun United World College
- Po Leung Kuk Choi Kai Yau School
- Renaissance College, Hong Kong
- Sha Tin College
- Singapore International School (Hong Kong)
- South Island School
- Stamford American School Hong Kong
- St. Paul's Co-educational College
- West Island School

=== India ===
- American Embassy School, Delhi
- American School of Bombay
- BD Somani International School, Mumbai
- The British School, New Delhi
- Canadian International School (Bangalore)
- Cathedral and John Connon School, Mumbai
- Dhirubhai Ambani International School, Mumbai
- Good Shepherd International School, Ooty
- Greenwood High International School
- Indus International School, Bangalore
- Indus International School, Pune
- The International School Bangalore
- Jamnabai Narsee School, Mumbai
- KIIT International School, Bhubaneswar
- Kodaikanal International School
- Mahindra United World College of India
- Oakridge International School, Hyderabad
- Oberoi International School, Mumbai
- Stonehill International School
- Trio World Academy, Bangalore
- Victorious Kidss Educares, Pune

=== Indonesia ===
- ACG School Jakarta
- ACS Jakarta
- AIS Indonesia
- Bali International School
- Bina Tunas Bangsa School
- British School Jakarta
- Gandhi Memorial International School
- Global Jaya International School
- Jakarta Intercultural School
- Sinarmas World Academy
- Singapore International School, Indonesia
- Surabaya Intercultural School
- Pelita Harapan School
- Yogyakarta International School

=== Iran ===
- Mehr-e-Taban Academy
- Tehran International School

=== Japan ===
- K International School
- Aoba-Japan International School
- Canadian Academy
- Horizon Japan International School
- Nagoya International School
- Osaka International School
- St. Mary's International School
- Tokyo International School
- Yokohama International School
- United World College ISAK Japan

=== Jordan ===
- Jubilee School
- Amman Baccalaureate School

=== Kuwait ===
- American International School of Kuwait

=== Lebanon ===
- International College, Beirut
- Wellspring Learning Community
- Sagesse High School

=== Macau ===
- School of the Nations (Macau)
- The International School of Macao
- Kao Yip Middle School

=== Malaysia ===
- Fairview International School
- International School of Kuala Lumpur
- The International School of Penang (Uplands)
- Kolej Mara Banting
- Malay College Kuala Kangsar
- Marlborough College Malaysia
- Mont'Kiara International School

=== Myanmar ===
- International School Yangon
- Yangon International School

=== Oman ===
- American British Academy
- The Sultan's School

=== Pakistan ===
- International School of Islamabad

=== Palestine ===
- Ramallah Friends Schools

=== Philippines ===
- The Beacon School
- Brent International School
- British School Manila
- Cebu International School
- German European School Manila
- International School Manila
- Mahatma Gandhi International School
- Saint Jude Catholic School
- Singapore School Manila
- Southville International School and Colleges
- Xavier School

=== Qatar ===
- ACS Doha
- Doha British School

=== Saudi Arabia ===
- British International School of Jeddah

=== Singapore ===
- Anglo-Chinese School (Independent)
- The British School, New Delhi
- GEMS World Academy (Singapore)
- St. Joseph's Institution
- Tanglin Trust School
- Canadian International School
- United World College of South East Asia

=== South Korea ===
- Branksome Hall Asia
- Chadwick International
- Dulwich College Seoul
- Gyeonggi Academy of Foreign Languages
- Gyeonggi Suwon International School
- Seoul Foreign School
- Taejon Christian International School

=== Syria ===
- International School of Aleppo

=== Taiwan ===
- I-Shou International School
- Taipei American School
- Taipei European School
- Kaohsiung American School

=== Thailand ===
- Bangkok Patana School, Bangkok
- British International School, Phuket
- International School Bangkok
- KIS International School Bangkok
- NIST International School
- Prem Tinsulanonda International School, Chiang Mai
- St Andrews International School Bangkok
- Wells International School
- United World College Thailand

=== United Arab Emirates ===
- The British International School Abu Dhabi
- Dubai International Academy
- Emirates International School
- GEMS Modern Academy
- GEMS Wellington International School (Dubai)
- GEMS World Academy
- Jumeirah English Speaking School
- Swiss International Scientific School in Dubai

=== Uzbekistan ===
- Tashkent International School (TIS)

=== Vietnam ===
- British International School Ho Chi Minh City
- ISHCMC, Ho Chi Minh City
- United Nations International School of Hanoi

== Australasia ==
=== Australia ===
- Albert Park College
- Anglican Church Grammar School
- Annesley Junior School
- Australian International Academy
- Blackwood High School
- Cairns State High School
- Canberra Grammar School
- Canberra Girls Grammar School
- Carey Baptist Grammar School
- Concordia College (South Australia)
- Copland College
- Cranbrook School, Sydney
- Elonera Montessori School
- Fintona Girls' School
- Firbank Girls' Grammar School
- Frankston High School
- Geelong Grammar School
- German International School Sydney
- Gilmore College
- Glenunga International High School
- Good Shepherd Lutheran College
- Hunter Valley Grammar School
- Immanuel College (Australia)
- Indooroopilly State High School
- International School of Western Australia
- Ivanhoe Grammar School
- John Paul College (Melbourne)
- John Paul College (Brisbane)
- John Wollaston Anglican Community School
- Kambala School
- Kardinia International College
- Kingswood College Doncaster
- Kingswood College (Box Hill)
- Kormilda College
- Loreto College, Victoria
- Loreto College, Marryatville
- Loreto College Coorparoo
- Loreto Kirribilli
- Loreto Normanhurst
- Loreto Mandeville Hall
- Lycée Condorcet (Sydney)
- Mercedes College (Adelaide)
- MLC School
- Monte Sant' Angelo Mercy College
- Moreton Bay Boys' College
- Mount Scopus Memorial College
- Mountain Creek State High School
- Newington College
- Oakleigh Grammar
- Pembroke School, Adelaide
- Presbyterian Ladies' College, Melbourne
- Presbyterian Ladies' College, Perth
- Preshil, The Margaret Lyttle Memorial School
- Prince Alfred College
- Queensland Academy for Science, Mathematics and Technology
- Queensland Academy for Creative Industries
- Queensland Academy for Health Sciences
- Ravenswood School for Girls
- SCECGS Redlands
- Scotch College, Perth
- Seymour College (Victoria)
- Seymour College
- Somerset College (Australia)
- Southern Christian College
- St Andrew's Cathedral School
- St Brigid's College
- St Dominic's Priory College, Adelaide
- St Leonard's College (Melbourne)
- St Paul's Grammar School
- St Peter's Collegiate Girls' School
- St Peters Lutheran College
- Tara Anglican School for Girls
- The Armidale School
- Friends' School, Hobart
- The Hills Grammar School
- Illawarra Grammar School
- Kilmore International School
- The King's School, Parramatta
- Tintern Grammar
- Trinity Grammar School Preparatory School
- Trinity Grammar School (New South Wales)
- Trinity Lutheran College (Queensland)
- Walford Anglican School for Girls
- Wesley College (Victoria)
- Woodcroft College
- Xavier College

=== New Zealand ===
- ACG Senior College
- Auckland International College
- Bay of Islands International Academy
- Chilton Saint James School
- Diocesan School for Girls, Auckland
- John McGlashan College
- Kristin School
- Queen Margaret College, Wellington
- Rangitoto College
- Saint Kentigern College
- Scots College, Wellington
- Selwyn House School
- St Cuthbert's College, Auckland
- St Margaret's College, Christchurch
- St Margaret's College, Otago
- St Mark's Church School
- St Peter's School, Cambridge
- Takapuna Grammar School

== Europe ==
=== Austria ===
- Graz International Bilingual School (GIBS)
- St. Gilgen International School (STGIS)
- Vienna International School (VIS)
- American International School Vienna (AISV)
- Danube International School
- Linz International School Auhof

=== Belgium ===
- Antwerp International School (AIS)
- International School of Brussels (ISB)
- St. John's International School (Belgium) (STJ)
- Bogaerts International School
- European School of Bruxelles-Argentuil (EEBA)
- British School of Brussels (BSB)

=== Bosnia and Herzegovina ===
- United World College in Mostar

=== Czech Republic ===
- Carlsbad International School
- English College Prague (ECP)
- The English International School Prague (EISP)
- International School of Ostrava
- International School of Prague (ISP)
- Prague British School (PBS)

=== Denmark ===
- Copenhagen International School (CIS)
- Grenaa Gymnasium & HF
- Herlufsholm School
- Kolding Gymnasium
- Langkaer Gymnasium
- Nørre Gymnasium
- Østerbro International School (ØIS)

=== France ===
- American School of Paris (ASP)
- International Bilingual School of Provence (IBS)
- International School of Paris (ISP)
- École Jeannine Manuel (EJM)

=== Germany ===
- Bavarian International School (BIS)
- Berlin Metropolitan School (ISS)
- Frankfurt International School (FIS)
- Helene-Lange-Gymnasium
- International School of Düsseldorf (ISD)
- International School of Stuttgart (ISS)
- Munich International School (MIS)
- St. George's The British International School
- Stiftung Louisenlund
- Robert Bosch United World College, Freiburg
- Dresden International School (DIS)

=== Greece ===
- Anatolia College
- Moraitis School, Athens
- Athens College

=== Italy ===
- American Overseas School of Rome
- American School of Milan
- The British School of Milan
- Deledda International School
- The English International School of Padua
- International School in Genoa
- International School of Milan
- Marymount International School of Rome
- Rome International School
- St. Stephen's School Rome
- United World College of the Adriatic

=== Latvia ===
- International School of Latvia

=== Netherlands ===
- American School of The Hague
- Amsterdam International Community School (AICS)
- British School in the Netherlands
- International School Eindhoven
- International School of The Hague
- International School Hilversum
- Rotterdam International Secondary School
- United World College Maastricht

=== Norway ===
- Bergen Cathedral School
- Kristiansand Cathedral School
- Oslo International School
- Red Cross Nordic United World College
- Skagerak International School
- Trondheim International School
- International School of Stavanger

=== Poland ===
- American School of Warsaw

=== Portugal ===
- Carlucci American International School of Lisbon
- Colégio Planalto
- Oeiras International School
- Oporto British School
- Saint Dominic's International School
- St. Julian's School

=== Romania ===
- American International School of Bucharest

=== Russia ===
- Anglo-American School of Moscow
- British International School (Moscow)

=== Slovakia ===
- Gymnasium Jur Hronec
- The British International School Bratislava

=== Spain ===
- International College Spain

=== Sweden ===
- Grennaskolan
- International School of the Gothenburg Region
- Katedralskolan, Linköping
- Katedralskolan, Skara
- Katedralskolan, Uppsala
- Katedralskolan, Växjö
- Malmö Borgarskola
- Sigtunaskolan Humanistiska Läroverket
- Stockholm International School

=== Switzerland ===
- American School in Switzerland
- Collège Alpin International Beau Soleil
- Collège Champittet, Pully
- Collège du Léman
- GEMS World Academy
- Haut-Lac International Bilingual School
- Institut auf dem Rosenberg
- Institut Le Rosey
- Inter-Community School Zürich
- International School Basel
- International School of Berne
- International School of Geneva
- International School of Lausanne
- International School of Zug and Luzern
- La Côte International School
- Realgymnasium Rämibühl
- Literargymnasium Rämibühl
- Zurich International School

=== Ukraine ===
- Kyiv International School
- Pechersk School International

=== United Kingdom ===
- The Abbey School, Reading
- Anglo European School
- Bedford School
- Bexley Grammar School
- Brentwood School, Essex
- Charterhouse School
- Colchester Sixth Form College
- Dane Court Grammar School, Kent
- Dartford Grammar School
- EF Academy Oxford
- EF Academy Torbay
- Exeter College, Exeter
- Fettes College
- German School London
- Godolphin and Latymer School
- Gresham's School
- Hautlieu School, Jersey
- Hockerill Anglo-European College
- Kent College, Canterbury
- King's College School, Wimbledon
- Malvern College
- Marymount International School London
- North London Collegiate School
- Oakham School
- Rochester Grammar School, Kent
- Sevenoaks School, Kent
- Sherborne School for Girls
- St Benedict's Catholic High School, Alcester
- Tonbridge Grammar School, Kent
- Torquay Boys' Grammar School
- United World College of the Atlantic
- Whitgift School

== North America ==
=== Bahamas ===
- Lyford Cay International School
- St Andrews School

=== Barbados ===
- Codrington School

=== Canada ===
- Academie Ste Cecile International School
- Ancaster High School
- Ashbury College
- Assumption College Catholic High School
- Balmoral Hall School
- Bayview Secondary School
- Bermuda High School
- Bishop Macdonell Catholic High School
- Branksome Hall
- Britannia Secondary School
- Brockton Preparatory School
- Brockville Collegiate Institute
- Cameron Heights Collegiate Institute
- Cardinal Carter Catholic High School
- Carson Graham Secondary School
- Chippewa Secondary School
- Cobourg Collegiate Institute
- Collège Jean-de-Brébeuf
- Colonel By Secondary School
- Dr. John Hugh Gillis Regional High School
- École des Pionniers (British Columbia)
- École Gabrielle-Roy (Surrey)
- École secondaire Jules-Verne
- École Victor-Brodeur
- Erindale Secondary School
- Guelph Collegiate Vocational Institute
- Glenforest Secondary School
- Glenview Park Secondary School
- Harold M. Brathwaite Secondary School
- Harry Ainlay High School
- Henry Wise Wood Senior High School
- John G. Diefenbaker High School
- King George Secondary School
- Kingston Collegiate and Vocational Institute
- Lester B. Pearson High School (Calgary)
- Lillian Osborne High School
- Luther College High School
- McNally High School
- M.E. LaZerte High School
- Monarch Park Collegiate Institute
- Mulgrave School
- New Westminster Secondary School
- Nicholson Catholic College
- Notre Dame Catholic Secondary School (Brampton)
- Old Scona Academic High School
- Park View Education Centre
- Pearson College UWC (Lester B. Pearson United College of the Pacific)
- Port Moody Secondary School
- R. E. Mountain Secondary School
- Richmond Secondary School
- Regiopolis-Notre Dame Catholic Secondary School
- Saint John High School
- Semiahmoo Secondary School
- Sir Winston Churchill High School
- Sir Winston Churchill Secondary School (Vancouver)
- St. Robert Catholic High School
- St. Thomas Aquinas Catholic
- Stratford Hall
- Strathcona-Tweedsmuir School
- TMS School
- Turner Fenton Secondary School
- Upper Canada College
- Victoria Park Collegiate Institute (Toronto)
- Westdale Secondary School
- Western Canada High School
- Weston Collegiate Institute
- West Vancouver Secondary School
- White Oaks Secondary School
- Wilmington Friends School
- York School

=== Jamaica ===
- American International School of Kingston (Kingston, Jamaica)

=== Mexico ===
- Cetys Universidad
- Colegio Americano de Puebla
- Escuela Preparatoria Federal Lázaro Cárdenas
- Greengates School
- Tec de Monterrey
- Universidad Regiomontana
- Universidad de Monterrey

=== United States ===
- Allen D. Nease High School
- Allen High School (Texas)
- Andress High School
- Andrew Hill High School
- Annapolis High School (Maryland)
- Annie Wright Schools
- Atherton High School, Louisville
- Atlee High School
- Awty International School
- Barack Obama Academy of International Studies 6-12
- Bartow High School
- Bethesda-Chevy Chase High School
- Biotechnology High School
- Bountiful High School
- British International School of Boston
- British International School of Chicago Lincoln Park
- British International School of Chicago, South Loop
- British International School of Houston
- British International School of Washington
- Brooke Point High School (Virginia)
- Brooklyn Center High School (Brooklyn Center, Minnesota)
- Brooklyn Latin School (Brooklyn, New York)
- C. Leon King High School
- Camden High School (Minneapolis)
- Campbell High School (Georgia)
- Canyon Springs High School (Moreno Valley, California)
- Cape Coral High School
- Carmel High School (Indiana)
- Carrollton School of the Sacred Heart Miami, Florida
- Central High School (Macon, Georgia)
- Central High School (Springfield, Missouri)
- City Honors School
- Clarke County High School (Berryville, Virginia)
- Clearfield High School
- Cleveland High School (Portland, Oregon)
- Connecticut IB Academy
- Cookeville High School
- Coppell High School
- Coral Gables Senior High School Miami, FL
- Coral Reef Senior High School
- Corcoran High School
- Coronado High School (El Paso, Texas)
- Cypress Creek High School (Orlando, Florida)
- Deerfield Beach High School
- DeLand High School
- Del Mar High School
- Desert Mountain High School
- Dobbs Ferry High School
- Douglas County High School (Castle Rock, Colorado)
- Downtown Magnets High School
- Dunbar High School (Fort Myers, Florida)
- Eastside High School (Gainesville, Florida)
- Edgewood High School (Edgewood, Maryland)
- EF Academy New York
- Edison High School (Minnesota) (Minneapolis)
- Fairmont Preparatory Academy
- Falls Church City Public Schools
- Fort Myers Senior High School
- Fresno High School
- Gar-Field High School
- Garland High School
- Gateway High School (Florida)
- GEMS World Academy (Chicago)
- George C. Marshall High School (Falls Church, Virginia)
- George Mason High School (Falls Church, Virginia)
- George Washington High School (Chicago)
- Germantown High School (Tennessee)
- Granada Hills Charter High School
- Grand Rapids High School (Grand Rapids, Minnesota)
- Great Oak High School (Temecula, California)
- Great River Charter Montessori School (St. Paul, Minnesota)
- Greeley West High School (Greeley, Colorado)
- Green Run Collegiate
- Grimsley High School
- Harding Senior High School (Saint Paul, Minnesota)
- Harrison High School
- Haines City High School
- Henrico High School
- Henry Foss High School
- Highland High School (Utah)
- Highland Park High School (Minnesota) (St. Paul, Minnesota)
- Hilton Head Island High School
- Hillcrest High School (Midvale, Utah)
- Hillsborough High School (Tampa, Florida)
- Hot Springs High School (Arkansas)
- Huron High School (Ann Arbor, Michigan)
- Inglemoor High School
- Interlake High School
- International Academy (Bloomfield Hills, Michigan)
- International High School of San Francisco
- The International School Portland, Oregon
- International School of Indiana
- Jim Hill High School (Jackson, Mississippi)
- John Adams High School (Indiana)
- John Dickinson High School (Wilmington, Delaware)
- John Randolph Tucker High School
- Johnson High School (Gainesville, Georgia)
- Klein Oak High School
- Lake Wales High School (Lake Wales, Florida)
- Lamar High School (Houston)
- Lawrence D. Bell High School (Hurst, Texas)
- Léman Manhattan Preparatory School
- Lexington High School (South Carolina)
- Lincoln High School (Lincoln, Nebraska)
- Lincoln High School (Portland, Oregon)
- Littleton High School (Colorado)
- Long Beach High School (New York)
- Long Trail School (Dorset, Vermont)
- Longview High School (Longview, Texas)
- Loveland High School (Colorado)
- Madison Country Day School (Madison, Wisconsin)
- Meade Senior High School
- Meadowbrook High School (Chesterfield County, Virginia)
- Meridian High School (Virginia)
- Midlothian High School (Virginia)
- Millard North High School (Omaha, Nebraska)
- Millbrook High School (Raleigh, North Carolina)
- Mira Loma High School
- Mission Bay Senior High School
- Morris Knolls High School (Rockaway, New Jersey)
- Monterey High School (Monterey, California)
- Newbury Park High School
- North Broward Preparatory School
- North Central High School (Indianapolis)
- North High School (Phoenix, Arizona)
- North Kansas City High School
- Ogden High School
- Old Mill High School
- Omaha Central High School
- Oregon Trail Academy
- Palisade High School (Mesa County, Colorado)
- Pensacola High School
- Plano East Senior High School
- Pioneer Valley Chinese Immersion Charter School
- Princess Anne High School
- The Prout School
- Richard Montgomery High School
- Riverdale High School (Fort Myers, Florida)
- Ronald Wilson Reagan College Preparatory High School
- Roosevelt High School (Minneapolis)
- Rufus King International School – High School Campus
- Rutherford High School (Florida)
- Saint Edward High School (Lakewood, Ohio)
- San Jose High School
- Saint George's School (Spokane, Washington)
- Saint John's Preparatory School
- Saint Paul Central High School (St. Paul, Minnesota)
- Saint Petersburg High School (St. Petersburg, Florida)
- Shiloh High School
- Skyline High School (Utah)
- Skyline High School (Washington)
- Smoky Hill High School
- Snowden International School
- Sonora High School (La Habra, California)
- South Charleston High School
- South Fork High School
- South Forsyth High School
- South Shore International College Preparatory High School
- Southside High School (Greenville, South Carolina)
- Southwest High School (Minneapolis)
- Spruce Creek High School (Port Orange, Florida)
- Stanton College Preparatory School
- Stony Point High School
- Strawberry Crest High School
- Sturgis Charter Public School
- Sunset High School (Beaverton, Oregon)
- Temple High School (Temple, Texas)
- Trinity High School (Euless, Texas)
- Troy High School (Fullerton, California)
- Tualatin High School
- United World College of the American West, Montezuma, New Mexico
- Valencia High School (Placentia, California)
- Valdosta High School (Valdosta, Georgia)
- Valley High School (Winchester, Nevada)
- The Village School (Houston, Texas)
- Waldo International School (Jersey City, New Jersey)
- Walnut High School (Walnut, California)
- Washburn High School (Minneapolis, Minnesota)
- Washington International School (Washington, D.C.)
- Wausau East High School (Wausau, Wisconsin)
- West High School (Salt Lake City, Utah)
- West Morris Central High School (Chester, New Jersey)
- West Morris Mendham High School (Mendham, New Jersey)
- Westwood High School (Austin, Texas) (Austin, Texas)
- Whitby School (Greenwich, Connecticut, USA)
- Wichita East High School (Wichita, Kansas)
- William G. Enloe High School (Raleigh, North Carolina)
- William Howard Taft High School (Chicago)
- William T. Dwyer High School (Palm Beach Gardens, Florida)
- Wilson Magnet High School
- Windermere Preparatory School
- Yonkers High School (Yonkers, New York)
- York High School (Virginia)

== Central/South America ==
=== Argentina ===
- Asociación Escuelas Lincoln (Buenos Aires)
- St. George's College (Quilmes)
- Washington School (Buenos Aires)
- Northlands School (Olivos and Nordelta)

=== Brazil ===
- American School of Rio de Janeiro
- American School of Brasilia
- Associação Escola Graduada de São Paulo
- Colégio Miguel de Cervantes (São Paulo)
- International School of Curitiba (Curitiba)
- Pan American School of Porto Alegre (Porto Alegre)
- St. Francis College (São Paulo)

=== Chile ===
- International School Nido de Aguilas (Santiago)
- Santiago College
- Saint John's School, San Pedro de la Paz

=== Colombia ===
- Anglo Colombian School (Bogotá)
- Colegio Albania (La Guajira Department)
- The English School
- Knightsbridge Schools International Bogotá (Bogotá)

=== Costa Rica ===
- United World College of Costa Rica

=== Ecuador ===
- Academia Cotopaxi
- Colegio Americano de Quito
- Colegio Intisana

=== Nicaragua ===
- Colegio Alemán Nicaragüense

=== Panama ===
- International School of Panama
- Knightsbridge Schools International Panama
- Metropolitan School of Panama

=== Perú ===
- Markham College
- Newton College

=== Venezuela ===
- British School, Caracas
