= Knightsbridge Schools International Montenegro =

Coordinates: 42°26′7.9″N 18°41′47.0″E

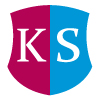
- Tivat; Montenegro

Information
- Type: Private International Day & Boarding School
- Motto: Be all you can be
- Established: 2010
- Principal: Gareth Barnaby
- Average class size: 20
- Student to teacher ratio: 14:1
- Website: ksi-montenegro.com

Knightsbridge Schools International Montenegro, also known as KSI Montenegro, is a co-educational, private international day school and boarding school for students aged 3–18. The school is located in Tivat, Montenegro.

The school is part of Knightsbridge Schools International (KSI), a pair of international schools based in Colombia and Montenegro and is affiliated with Knightsbridge School in London.

== Curriculum ==
KSI Montenegro is accredited to teach the International Baccalaureate programme and is an IB World School. The school offers the IB Primary Years Programme, IB Middle Years Programme and IB Diploma Programme.

== Language programmes ==
English is the primary language of instruction.
