= Stratford Hall =

Stratford Hall may refer to:

- Stratford Hall (school), a private school in Vancouver, British Columbia, Canada
- Stratford Hall (plantation), a plantation in Westmoreland County, Virginia, United States, birthplace of Robert E. Lee and home to four generations of the Lee family
