= Qingdao Grand Theatre =

Opera house in Qingdao, China

- 青岛大剧院
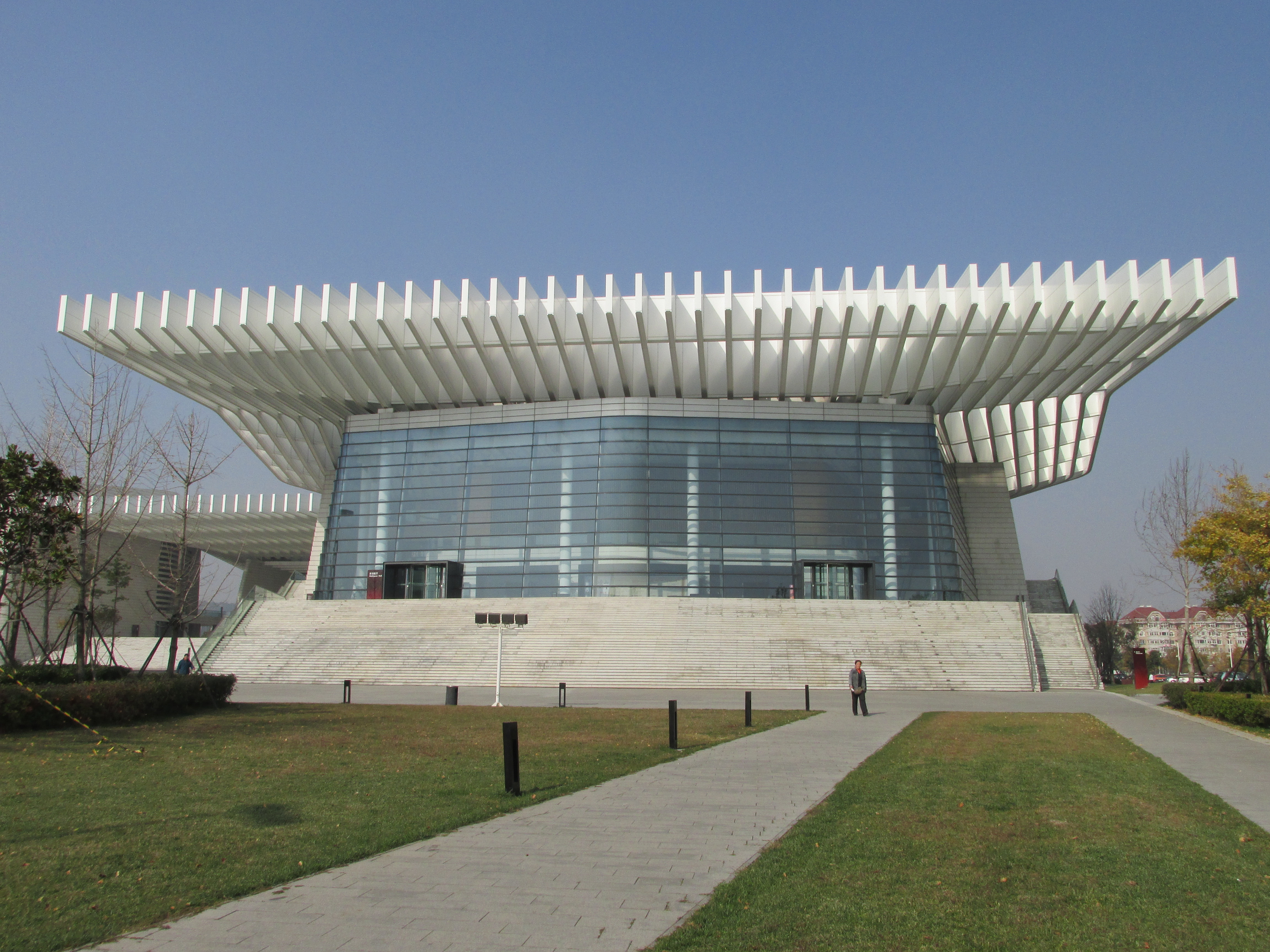

General information
- Status: Completed
- Location: Qingdao, People's Republic of China
- Completed: 2010

Design and construction
- Architect: Gerkan, Marg and Partners

Other information
- Seating capacity: 1600 (Opera Hall) and 1200 (Music Hall)

Website
- www.qingdaograndtheatre.com

Qingdao Grand Theatre (simplified Chinese: 青岛大剧院; traditional Chinese: 青島大劇院; pinyin: Qingdao Dajuyuan) is an opera house in Laoshan District of Qingdao, Shandong province, People's Republic of China.
