= ISG =

ISG may refer to:

== Academics ==
- Information Security Group, academic information security group in Royal Holloway, University of London
- Indian School, Al-Ghubra, a K-12 school in Muscat, Oman
- International School of Geneva, an international school in Geneva, Switzerland
- International School in Genoa, an international school in Genoa, Italy
- International School Groningen, an international school in Haren, Netherlands
- ISG Business School, a business school in Paris, France

== Organisations ==
- Idaho State Guard, active during World War II
- Independent Senators Group, a Canadian Senate parliamentary group
- Interactive Support Group, a defunct CD-I development company
- International Steel Group, a steel company headquartered in Cleveland, Ohio
- Interserve Group, a UK construction company
- Iowa State Guard, active during World War II
- ISG Ltd, a UK construction company

== Transportation ==
- Integrated Starter-Generator, part of an automotive start-stop system
- Ishigaki Airport (IATA airport code) on Ishigaki Island, Okinawa, Japan

== Other uses ==
- In situ gasification, a process in underground coal gasification (UCG)
- Instruction Stream Generator, also called random test generator
- Interferon-stimulated genes, a varied group of genes that are switched on by interferon to tackle viral infection
- International Socialist Group, a Trotskyist group and British section of the Fourth International between 1987 and 2009
- Iraq Study Group, a 2006 congressionally appointed panel charged with assessing the situation in Iraq, also known as the Baker-Hamilton Commission
- Iraq Survey Group, the 2003–2005 investigative mission in the Iraqi WMD search program that produced the Duelfer Report
- Irish Sign Language (ISO 639 code isg)
- Islamic Solidarity Games, multinational multi-sport event
- Immune serum globulin
