= Cebu International School =

Location
- Pit-os; Cebu City, 6000; Philippines
- 10°23′37″N 123°55′16″E

Information
- Former name: Cebu American School
- School type: Non-profit, Private, International School
- Motto: Responsible, Respectful, and Prepared
- Established: 1924; 102 years ago
- Superintendent: Peter Welch
- Grades: Preschool – Grade 12
- Enrollment: 300
- Houses: Acacia, Mahogany, Molave, Narra
- Athletics conference: International Schools Athletic Conference (ISAC)
- Mascot: Dragon
- Website: cis.edu.ph

Cebu International School (CIS), was founded as the Cebu American School in 1924, and renamed in 1973. It is a co-educational day school, non-profit, non-sectarian institution, governed by a ten-member Board of Trustees. The current legal status of the school is defined in Republic Act No. 9190 (2003). English is the language of instruction at CIS.

The campus is located in Pit-os, Cebu City, on a 3.2-hectare purpose-built campus established in 2000. Before settling in its present site, the school was originally housed in a villa on Gorordo Avenue, later relocating to Banilad (opposite Cebu Country Club).

Cebu International School is an authorized IB World School, offering the International Baccalaureate Diploma Programme (IB DP) from 1999, the IB Primary Years Programme (PYP) from January 2014, and the IB Middle Years Programme (MYP) from 2020.

In the 2007–2008 school year, CIS attained full international accreditation status through the Council of International Schools (CIS), and the Western Association of Schools and Colleges (WASC). CIS is also a full member of the East Asia Regional Council of Overseas Schools (EARCOS).

In September 2024, Cebu International School hosted a joint re-accreditation and re-authorization visit by the Council of International Schools (CIS), the Western Association of Schools and Colleges (WASC), and the International Baccalaureate (IB). Following the visit, the school was successfully re-accredited by CIS and WASC and re-authorized to offer all three IB programmes, reaffirming its status as a fully accredited international school.

== Student Body and Faculty ==
The school hosts a diverse student body representing over 20 nationalities. Its international faculty is composed of teachers from more than 10 countries.

== Boarding ==
The campus includes a Student Residence with capacity for 40 students (20 girls and 20 boys), serving ages 12 to 18. The residence offers full, weekly, and nightly boarding options.
