= Qingdao Amerasia International School =

Location
- Qingdao, Shandong; People's Republic of China; 36.10834017018422°N 120.52521228790285°E

Information
- Type: Co-ed, private, day school
- Established: 2011
- Principal: Christopher C Vicari, Ed.D
- Enrollment: App. 130
- Campus: Shazikou, Dongjiang (Baishan Campus), Laoshan District
- Affiliations: International Baccalaureate Montessori
- Website: Homepage

Qingdao Amerasia International School (QAIS) is a private, non-profit international school located in Qingdao, China, offering Montessori education from ages 1.5-5 and an inquiry-based curriculum up to age 18. QAIS has over 200 enrolled students representing 25 countries. Qingdao Amerasia International School is an International Baccalaureate World School, offering the full IB Continuum: the IB Primary Years Programme, IB Middle Years Programme, and IB Diploma Programme. Its Montessori Toddler and Montessori Early Childhood Programs are the only programs in Asia to be accredited by the American Montessori Society.

The language of instruction is English with Mandarin Chinese as an additional language taught daily.

== History ==
Qingdao Amerasia International School began its first classes on September 4, 2006 as Qingdao American International School. This new school was the result of the rapidly growing foreign community in Qingdao and the need for a learning environment that provided a solid education comparable to a typical American K-12 school.

In August 2011, the school became licensed by the Chinese Government as an International School #110, and re-opened with a new philosophy of international mindedness, as well as a new name – Qingdao Amerasia International School.

== Curriculum ==
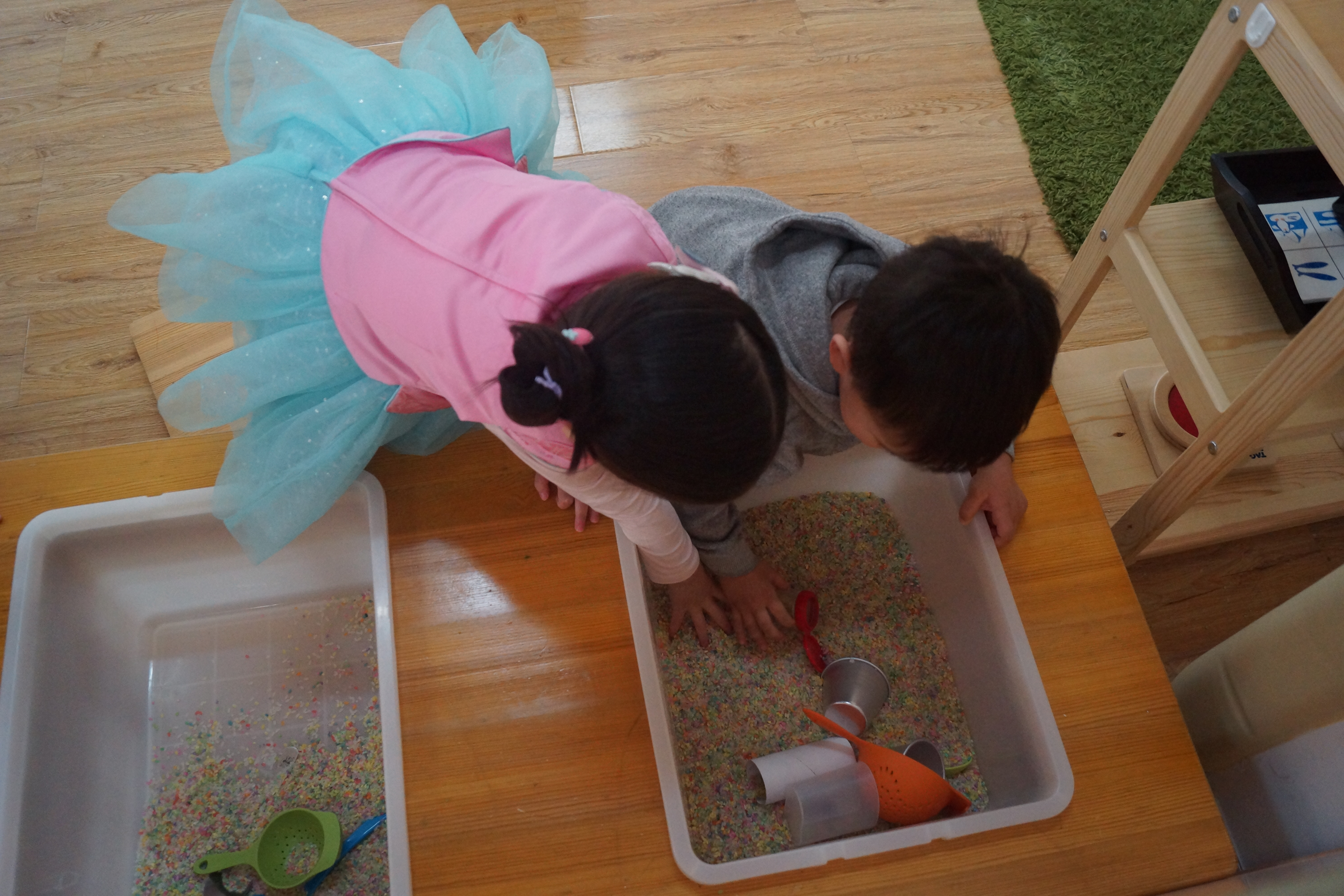
Montessori Toddler students practice their sensory skills with a sandbox.

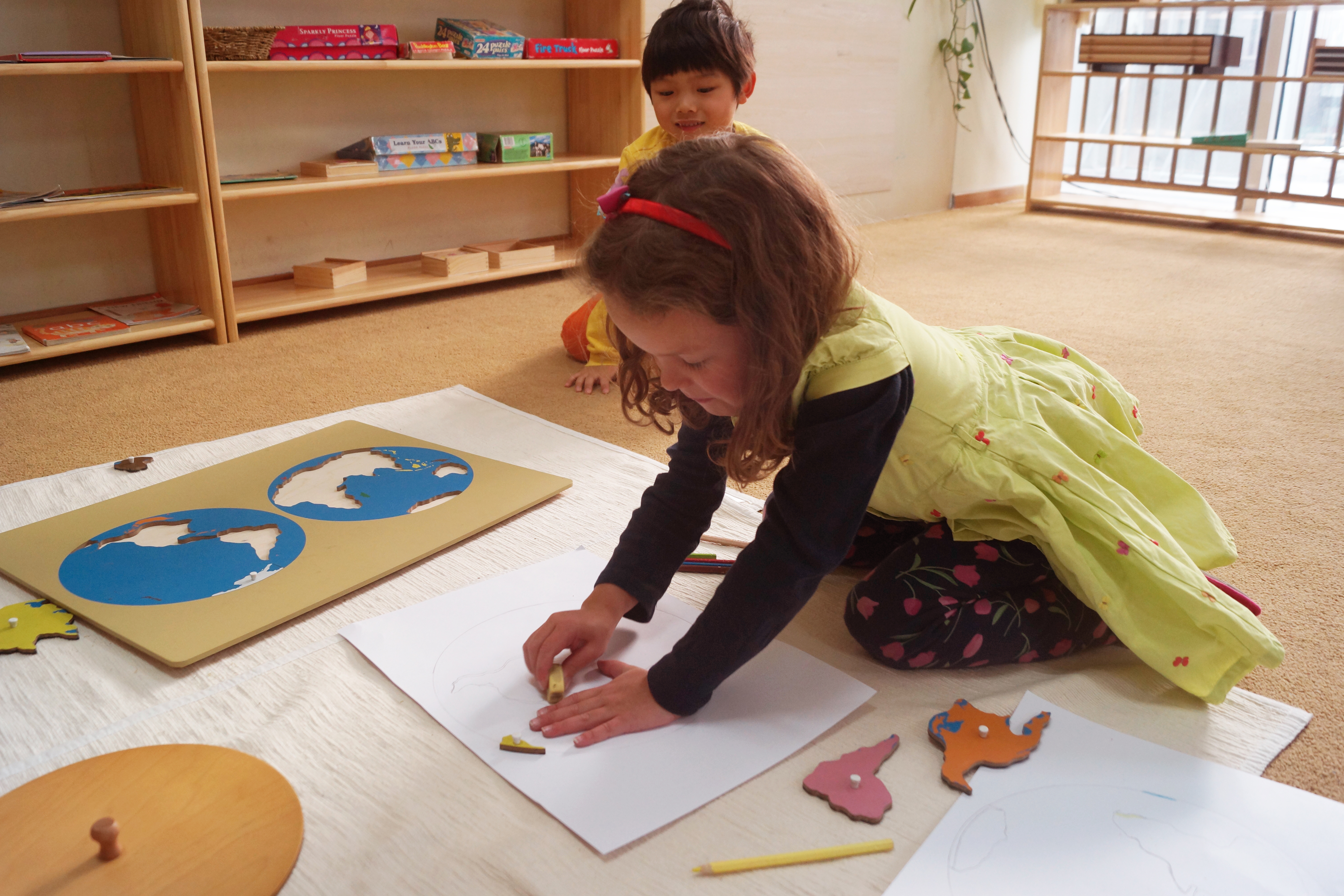
Montessori Early Childhood studentstudying geography

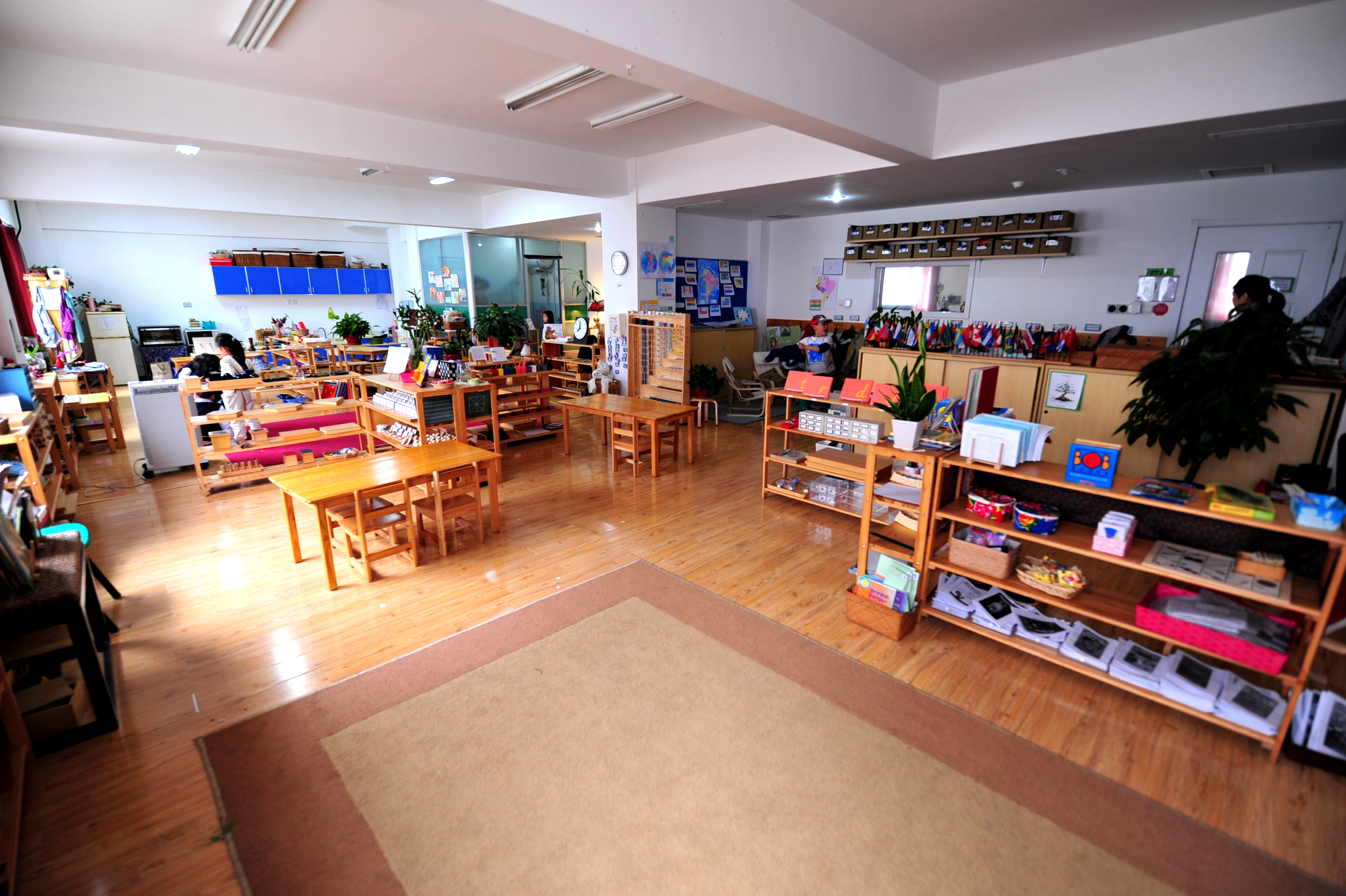
A Montessori classroom at Qingdao Amerasia International School

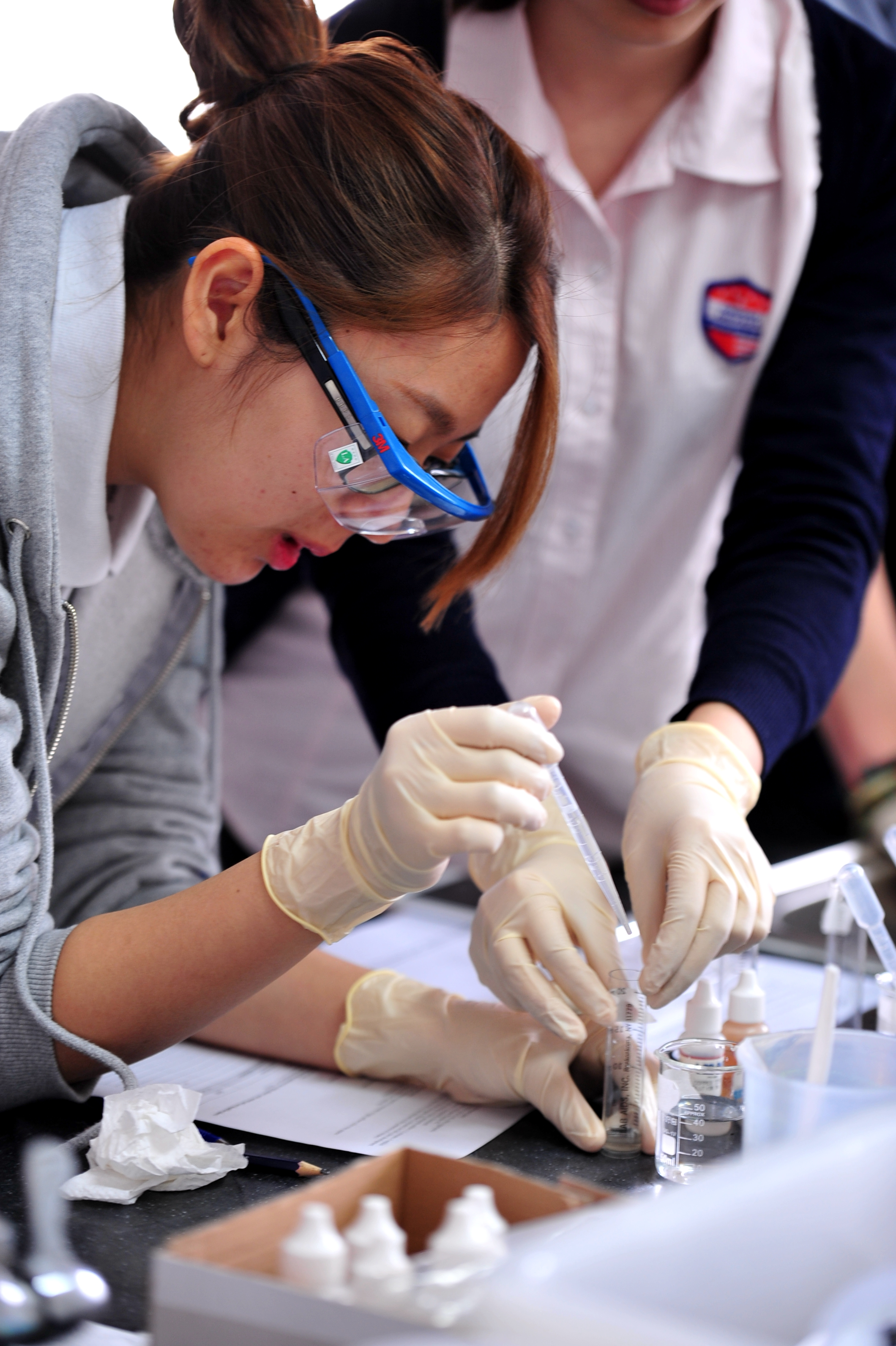
QAIS diploma student doing a science experiment

QAIS curriculum follows both IB and Montessori programmes of study.

- Montessori Toddler (18 months – 3 years)
- Montesori Early Childhood (3–6)
- IB Primary Years Program (grades 1 through 6)
- IB Middle Years Programme/IB Diploma Years Programme (grades 7-12)

The Middle Years Programme (grades 7-10) includes the following eight curricular areas:

- Group #1: Language and Literature (English and Mandarin)
- Group #2: Acquired Language (English and Mandarin)
- Group #3: Humanities (Individuals & Societies, History, Economics, Politics, etc.)
- Group #4: Integrated Science (Earth Science, Biology, Chemistry, Physics)
- Group #5: Mathematics
- Group #6: Music, Art, Drama, Film
- Group #7: Design Technology
- Group #8: Physical and Health Education

The Diploma Programme grades 11-12 includes three ‘core’ components (Extended Essay, Theory of Knowledge, and Creativity/Action/Service) in addition to the following six curricular areas:

- Group #1: Language and Literature (English and Mandarin)
- Group #2: Acquired Language (English and Mandarin)
- Group #3: Individuals and Societies
- Group #4: Biology
- Group #5: Mathematics
- Group #6: Music or Film

== The arts ==
Art and Drama are taught at Qingdao Amerasia International School, as well as Music, including Band, Violin, and Orchestra.

== Outdoor activities ==
Qingdao Amerasia International School is located less than 1 km from the beach, about 5 km from downtown, and a 30 minute drive from Laoshan Natural Reserve. Guoxin Stadium, with two Olympic-sized swimming pools, diving pool, gym, spinning room, fitness classes, and basketball and volleyball courts, is walking distance from the school, while biking and hiking trails of Fu Shan Mountains are just across the road. QAIS students learn to sail at Qingdao International Sailing Center, hike and camp in Asia's highest coastal mountains at Laoshan, and go skiing in the winter.

== Student life ==
Qingdao Amerasia International School has many extracurricular activities, which are offered to students from 3:40 to 4:40 on designated days. The list changes throughout the year, but there is a range of activities offered by internal staff and external companies, such as:

- Cooking & Baking
- Ballet
- Soccer
- Basketball
- Chess Club
- Math Club
- 3D printing
- Minecraft
- Calligraphy
- Trampoline and Aerobics
- Lego Club
- Art Club
- Drum Club
- Guitar
- Band

Secondary has its own student government, known as Student Council, and many of its members also join the Model United Nations (MMUN) student group. The school also has a Youth Club.

== Regional and international trips ==
Every year, QAIS Secondary students take a trip to major regional and international destinations. In 2012, students spent a week in Beijing, working in groups to produce travel documentaries about the Temple of Heaven, Summer Palace, Great Wall of China, and Tian'anmen Square. In April 2014, QAIS secondary students spent six days in London, England, and in 2015 went to Paris, France, Chengdu, China, and Seoul, South Korea.

In 2016, Secondary students went to Changchun in China. In 2016, fourteen students from grades 9 to 12 took a trip to the Global Issues Conference at the Western Academy of Beijing (WAB). At the same time, ten QAIS students from grades 6, 7, and 8 attended the International Schools Theatre Association (ISTA) festival in Shanghai, Pudong. In February 2017, students went skiing in Jimo, and in May 2017, grade 7-10 students participated in a Rome Model United Nations General Assembly event in Rome, Italy.

== Facility ==
QAIS is located in the Shilaoren area of Qingdao. The campus features classrooms and gross motor facilities for toddler and early childhood programs. Throughout the school, classrooms are designed to maximize natural light. There are fully equipped science laboratories, cafeteria, library, technology lab, basketball court, and small soccer pitch.

The bottom floor features a music, drama and violin room as well as performance facilities including a stage for student performances. The cafeteria, ping pong court and lower playground with basketball court and small soccer pitch are on this level. The second floor contains a library which has a tiered story-time area for teachers to read to their classes and printers for teacher and student use, as well as a community room and a design teaching space with 3D printers. Administration offices, a gross motor play area for the Early Childhood program, and Montessori and toddler classrooms are on the fourth floor. These spaces have been newly renovated and all contain complete sets of Montessori materials and manipulative for the programs. Outside of the main entrance on the fourth floor is our upper level playground, which primarily serves the younger students. The Fifth floor has classrooms for grades one through six, and the nurse's office. The learning support office, a fully equipped science lab, and a large art room are also on this floor.

The newly acquired eleventh floor serves MYP and DP students (7-12). On this floor there are high ceilings and large, cleanly furnished classrooms to capitalize on the natural light streaming in from the picture windows, which span the whole level from floor to ceiling.

== Matriculation ==
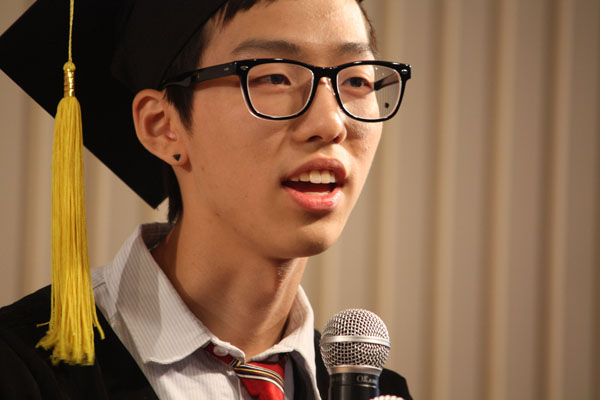
Kevin Park

QAIS provides an American diploma, recognized by universities around the world.

In June 2012, YoungChul (Kevin) Park became the first student to graduate from QAIS. Having completed four years of study at QAIS, including five Advanced Placement courses, he was accepted to Ohio State University, Miami University of Ohio, and SUNY Albany. Other graduates have been accepted to research and liberal arts institutions in the United States, including Brigham Young University, Centre College, and College of Wooster.

In 2014, a QAIS graduate was accepted to all three of Korea's top universities: Seoul National University, Korea University, and Yonsei University.

== Licensing and affiliations ==
QAIS is accredited by many associations. QAIS is an IB World School, which means that it is accredited for its IB Primary Years Programme, IB Middle Years Programme and IB Diploma Programme. Its Montessori Toddler and Early Childhood programs are accredited by the American Montessori Society. The school is also accredited by the Middle States Association, and is currently a candidate for accreditation with CIS (Council of International Schools).

QAIS is authorized by the National Ministry of Education of the People's Republic of China, as China No. 110 International School.

== Faculty and staff ==
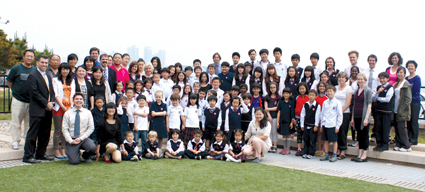
Students, teachers and staff of Qingdao Amerasia International School in June, 2012

=== Teachers ===
QAIS teachers come from the United States, Canada, Britain, Australia, New Zealand, Malaysia, South Africa, Turkey, and China.

60% of teachers and administrative faculty hold a master's degree or higher.

All Early Childhood teachers are certified by either the American Montessori Society or Association Montessori International (AMI); all K-12 teachers have recent, relevant IB training in their program and subject.
