= Jannah Sonnenschein =

Dutch–Mozambican swimmer

Personal information
- Nationality: Dutch; Mozambican
- Born: 24 April 1996 (age 30) Kerkrade, Netherlands
- Height: 1.68 m (5 ft 6 in)
- Weight: 60 kg (132 lb)

Sport
- Sport: Swimming
- Strokes: Butterfly
- College team: New Mexico State Aggies

Jannah Sonnenschein (born 24 April 1996) is a Dutch–Mozambican swimmer. She competed in the women's 100 metre butterfly event at the 2016 Summer Olympics.

== Personal life ==
Sonnenschein was born in the Dutch town of Kerkrade, but is originally from Amsterdam and moved shortly after her birth with her family to Mozambique. They spent most of their lives there and she did her schooling at American International School of Mozambique at Maputo. She graduated from New Mexico State University. From a young age, Sonnenschein trained with swimming club Golfinhos de Maputo, and achieved good early results. In 2011, She moved to the Netherlands at the age of 15 in order to train for her swimming career and competing in the Olympics.

== Career ==
Since 2012, Sonnenschein lives in Eindhoven to train there with the association Eiffel Swimmers PSV. During 2014, Sonnenschein competed at the 2014 Commonwealth Games in Scotland. In 2014 Sonnenschein also the first timecompeted at the 2014 Summer Youth Olympic Games in Nanjing, where she was flag bearer of the Mozambican delegation. She reached the 100m butterfly finals with a time of 1:03:50 minutes, reaching a new Mozambican national record. She was also the only Mozambican swimmer ever to qualify for the Summer Youth Olympic Games.

Sonnenschein qualified well for the 2016 Summer Olympics in Rio de Janeiro and was part of the six-member delegation athletes Mozambique. In the 100m butterfly Sonnenschein participated in the preliminary round with a time of 1: 04.21 min with the 38th (of 45) places.
