= Waldo International School =

Private school in Jersey City, New Jersey, United States

Location
- 110 1st Street; Jersey City, NJ 07302
- 40.721363°N 74.037611°W

Information
- Type: Private school
- Established: 2011
- NCES School ID: A1902900
- Principal: Daniela Elena Sarbu
- Grades: Preschool–8
- Student to teacher ratio: 8:1
- Website: School website

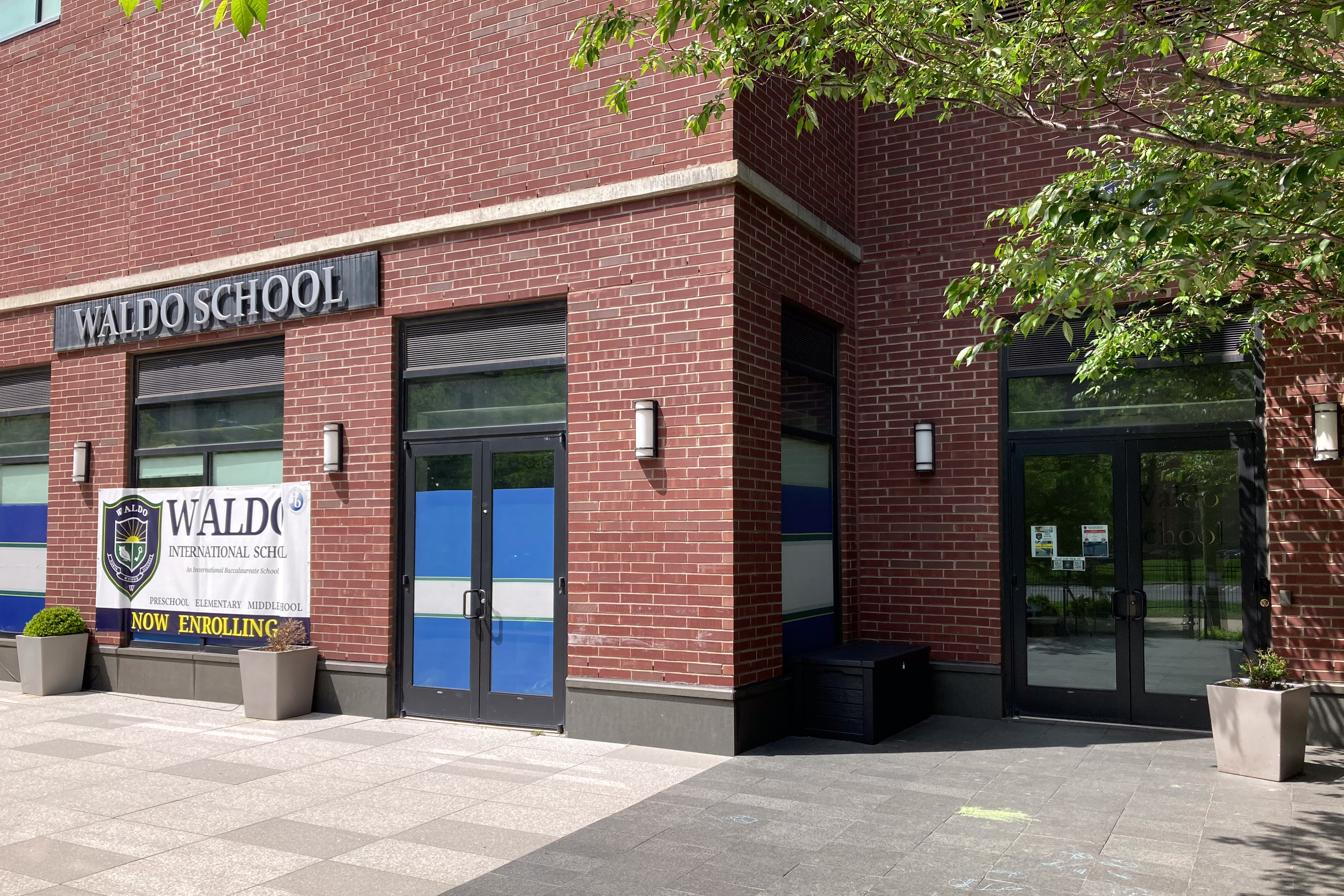

Waldo International School is a co-educational International Baccalaureate private school in Jersey City, New Jersey. It was founded in 2011 by Daniela Sarbu and offers classes from preschool to eighth grade, as well as daycare and summer camps. It offers the IB Primary Years Programme and the IB Middle Years Programme.

== History ==
In September 2011, Daniela Sarbu officially opened the Waldo School for preschool age children. Throughout the following years, the school has grown by one grade every year until becoming an infant-8 school.

In 2016, the school moved to its current main Jersey City location at 110 1st Street. In 2016, it was accredited by the International Baccalaureate and opened a second location.

In July 2024, it opened a third location in the Harborside area with a US$27M investment.
