= Laoshan, Qingdao =

Laoshan 崂山区
- District
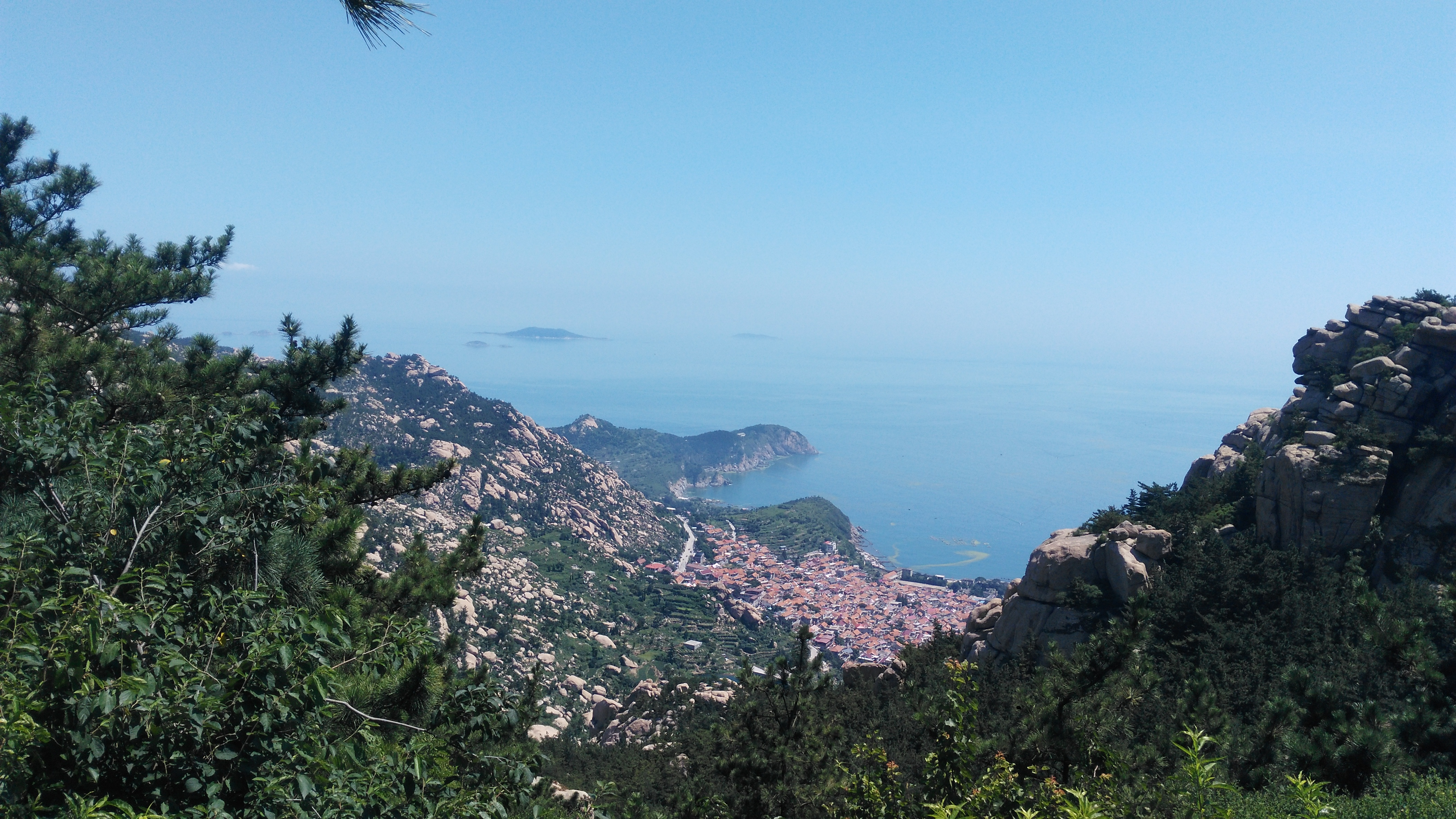
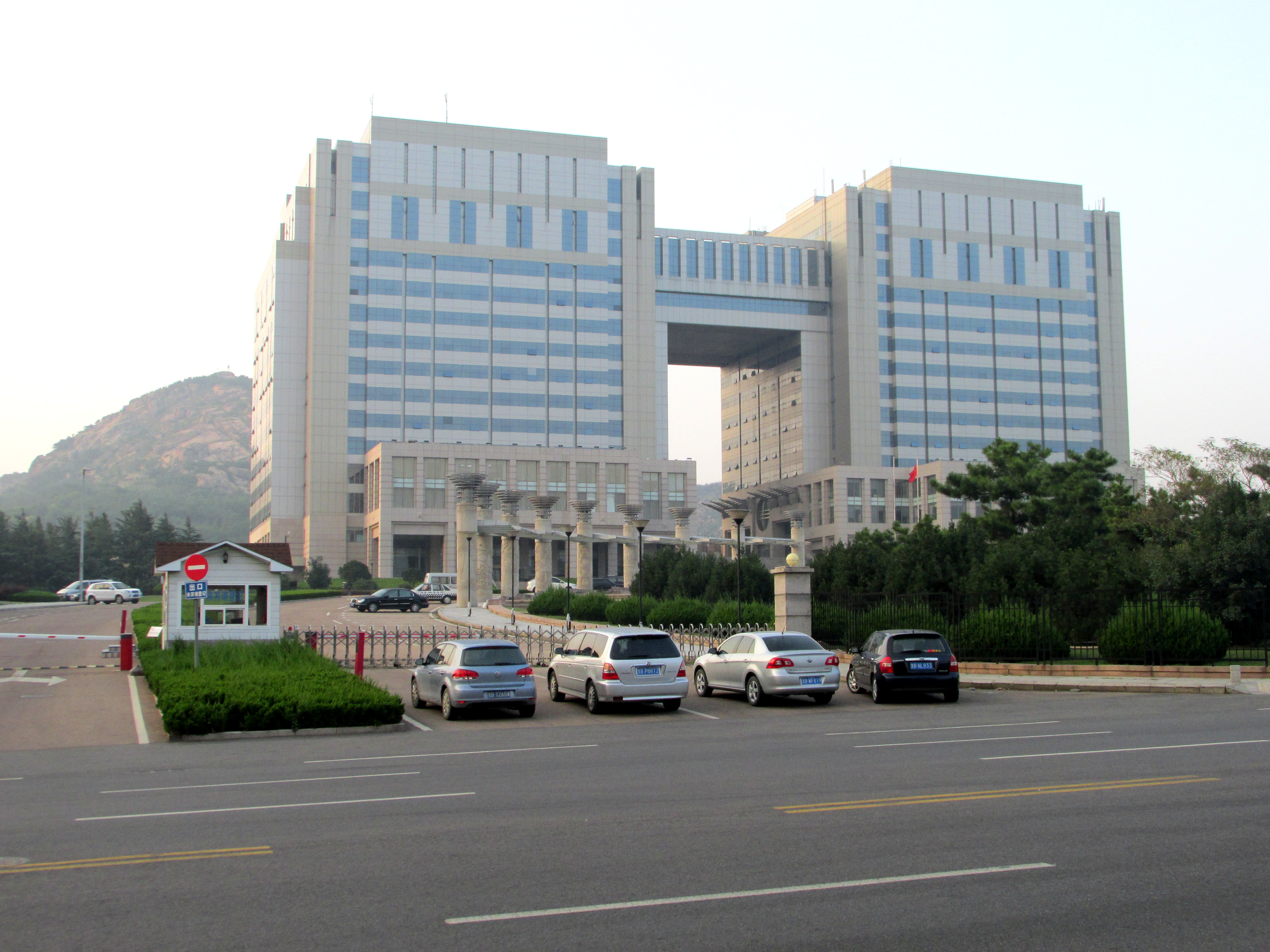
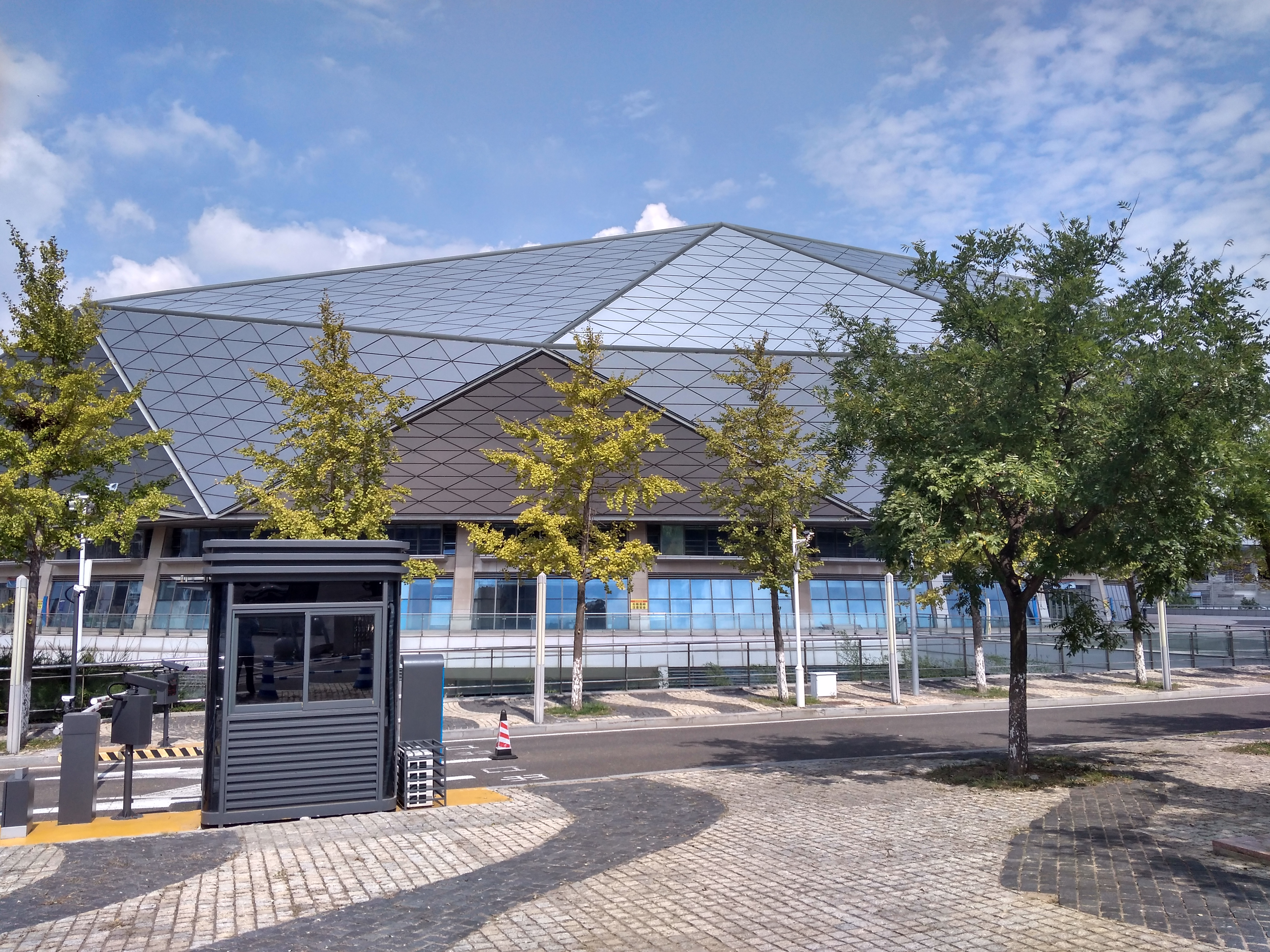
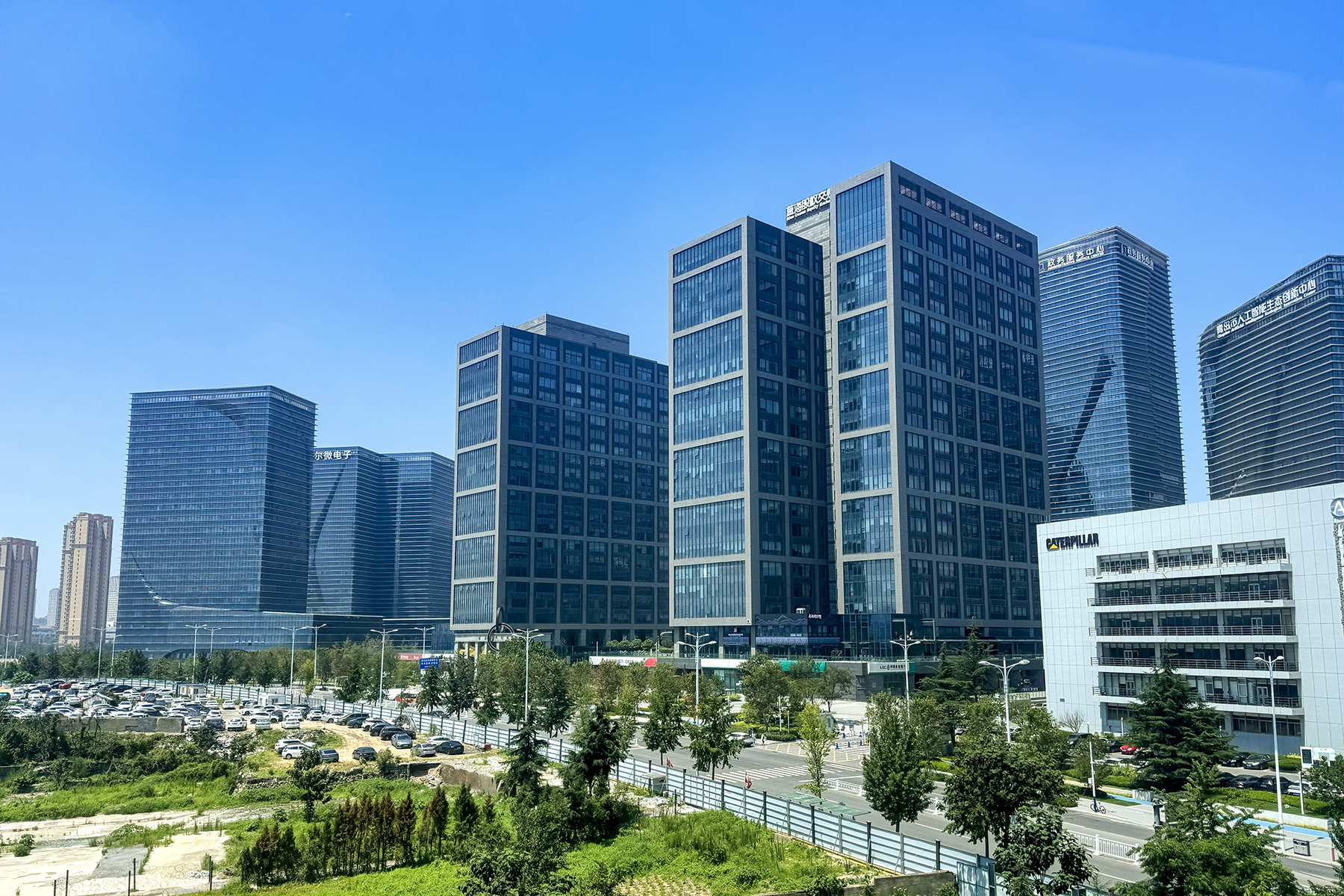
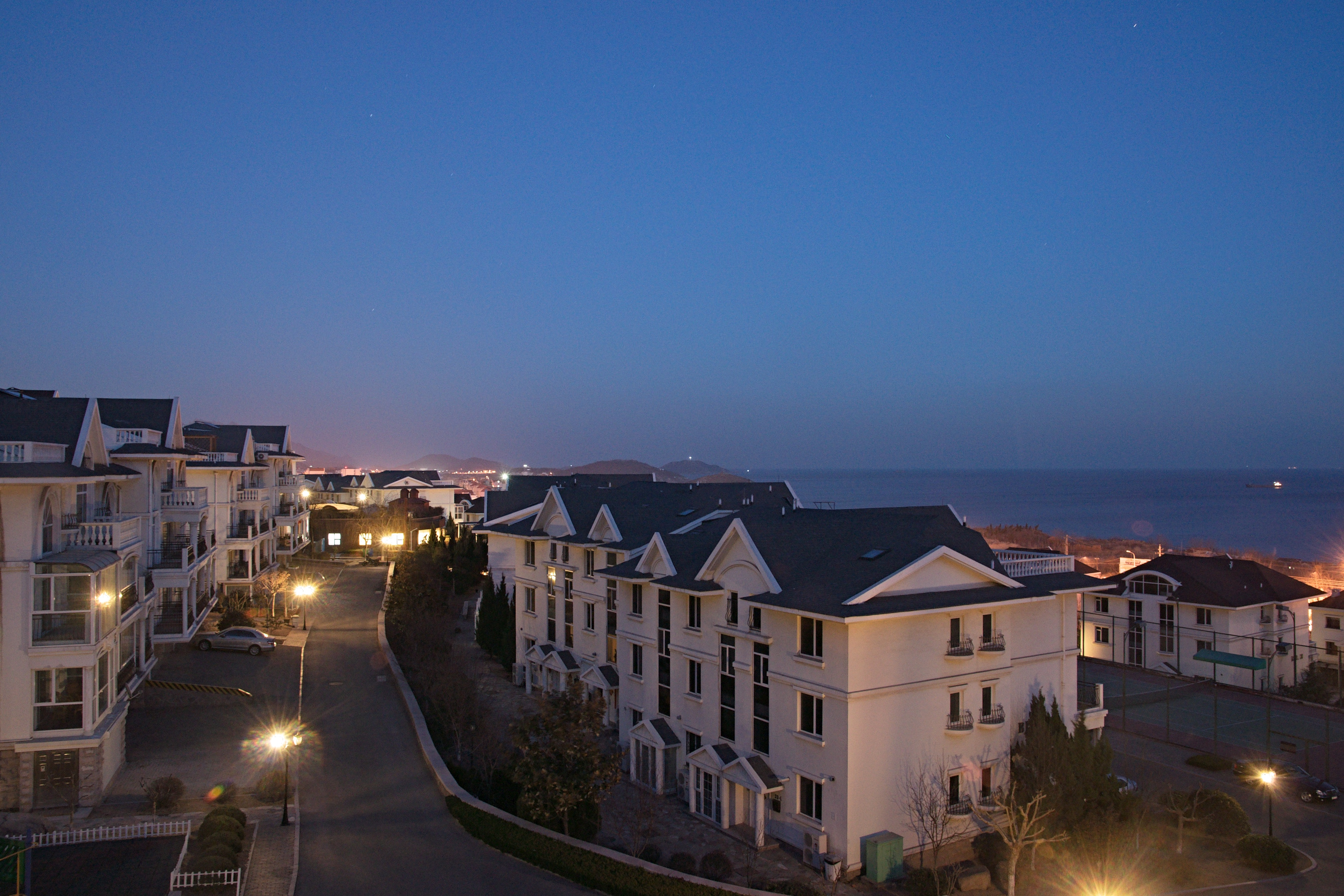
- View of a settlement from Mount Lao Laoshan District Government Conson Gymnasium Qingdao International Innovation Park Seaside apartments

- Location in Shandong
- Coordinates (Laoshan City Hall): 36°06′27″N 120°28′8″E
- Country: China
- Province: Shandong
- Sub-provincial city: Qingdao
- Subdistricts: Neighborhoods: 中韩街道 China and South Korea Street; 沙子口街道 Shazikou Street; 王哥庄街道 Wanggezhuang Street; 北宅街道 Beizhai Streets

Government
  - Mayor: Yang Pengming (杨鹏鸣)

Area
  - Total: 858.2 km^{2} (331.4 sq mi)

Population (2019)
  - Total: 455,900
- Time zone: UTC+8 (China standard time)
- Postal code: 266100
- Website: http://www.laoshan.gov.cn/

Laoshan District (simplified Chinese: 崂山区; traditional Chinese: 嶗山區; pinyin: Láoshān Qū) is an urban district (区) of Qingdao, Shandong. It has an area of 858 square kilometres (212,000 acres; 331 sq mi) and had approximately 379,500 inhabitants as of 2010. It is home to Mount Lao, which gave the district its name.

== Geography ==
Laoshan District is located in the south of the Shandong Peninsula, facing the Yellow Sea in the east and south. It covers 858 km^{2} (331 sq mi) with 103.7 km^{2} (40.0 sq mi) of coastline. The mountain ranges of Laoshan cover most of the eastern part of the district.

The district belongs to north temperature zone, with a monsoon-influenced temperate climate. There is neither intense heat in summer nor severe cold in winter. Most of the district is highland with the average altitude of 55m and surface water of 3m. There is abundant high quality ground water. In fact, Laoshan mineral water is renowned and sold China-wide. Natural resources are abundant, with granite being the prevalent mineral in the area.

== Climate ==
Climate data for Laoshan, elevation 54 m (177 ft), (1991–2020 normals, extremes 1981–2010)
Month	Jan	Feb	Mar	Apr	May	Jun	Jul	Aug	Sep	Oct	Nov	Dec	Year
Record high °C (°F)	13.4 (56.1)	16.8 (62.2)	23.8 (74.8)	31.5 (88.7)	35.4 (95.7)	35.6 (96.1)	39.5 (103.1)	36.7 (98.1)	38.0 (100.4)	28.5 (83.3)	24.2 (75.6)	18.5 (65.3)	39.5 (103.1)
Mean daily maximum °C (°F)	4.0 (39.2)	6.4 (43.5)	11.5 (52.7)	17.6 (63.7)	23.0 (73.4)	26.1 (79.0)	29.1 (84.4)	29.7 (85.5)	26.5 (79.7)	20.8 (69.4)	13.2 (55.8)	6.2 (43.2)	17.8 (64.1)
Daily mean °C (°F)	−0.1 (31.8)	2.1 (35.8)	7.0 (44.6)	12.9 (55.2)	18.5 (65.3)	22.1 (71.8)	25.7 (78.3)	26.2 (79.2)	22.5 (72.5)	16.3 (61.3)	9.0 (48.2)	2.2 (36.0)	13.7 (56.7)
Mean daily minimum °C (°F)	−3.2 (26.2)	−1.0 (30.2)	3.4 (38.1)	9.2 (48.6)	14.9 (58.8)	19.2 (66.6)	23.2 (73.8)	23.4 (74.1)	19.0 (66.2)	12.6 (54.7)	5.6 (42.1)	−0.9 (30.4)	10.4 (50.8)
Record low °C (°F)	−12.5 (9.5)	−11.9 (10.6)	−6.8 (19.8)	−2.4 (27.7)	3.6 (38.5)	10.2 (50.4)	17.5 (63.5)	14.7 (58.5)	8.4 (47.1)	−0.2 (31.6)	−7.4 (18.7)	−12.4 (9.7)	−12.5 (9.5)
Average precipitation mm (inches)	10.1 (0.40)	14.1 (0.56)	14.1 (0.56)	33.6 (1.32)	62.8 (2.47)	69.6 (2.74)	162.0 (6.38)	150.2 (5.91)	72.4 (2.85)	28.8 (1.13)	33.2 (1.31)	12.0 (0.47)	662.9 (26.1)
Average precipitation days (≥ 0.1 mm)	3.0	3.8	4.3	5.7	7.0	7.4	11.0	11.2	7.5	4.9	5.0	3.8	74.6
Average snowy days	3.6	3.3	1.5	0	0	0	0	0	0	0	0.8	3.0	12.2
Average relative humidity (%)	61	60	58	59	64	75	80	77	68	62	63	62	66
Mean monthly sunshine hours	158.9	158.7	210.0	229.7	236.9	196.7	171.3	186.1	197.1	198.4	165.6	157.1	2,266.5
Percentage possible sunshine	51	51	56	58	54	45	39	45	53	57	54	52	51
Source: China Meteorological Administration

== Administrative divisions ==
By the end of 2020, Laoshan District has 5 streets with 163 communities under the jurisdiction of Jinjialing Street, Zhonghan Street, Shazikou Street, Wanggezhuang Street and Beizhai Street.

== Population ethnicity ==
=== Population ===
By the end of 2016, the total resident population of the region was 435,500, with an urbanization rate of 84.7%. The total number of households registered in the region was 92,025; the total population was 286,046, of which 206,108 were in urban areas and 79,938 in rural areas. The registered temporary population is 71,359. New births 4158 people, birth rate 14.77 ‰, natural population growth rate 9.25 ‰.

According to the seventh census data, as of November 1, 2020 at 00:00, Laoshan District has a resident population of 502,370.

=== Ethnicity ===
The majority of the population in Laoshan District is Han Chinese. According to the 2010 census data, there are 4,624 ethnic minorities, accounting for 1.22% of the total population. More than 100 people of ethnic minorities, Korean 1579 people, 791 Manchu, Hui 632 people, Mongolian 366 people, Uyghur 340 people, Miao 187 people, Tujia 153 people, Zhuang 106 people.

== Economy ==
- The unified accounting results of the Qingdao Bureau of Statistics show that the region achieved a gross domestic product of 81.814 billion yuan in 2019, an increase of 7.4% over the previous year at comparable prices. Among them, the value added of the primary industry was 663 million yuan, down 14.3%; the value added of the secondary industry was 25.582 billion yuan, up 8.5%; and the value added of the tertiary industry was 55.569 billion yuan, up 7.3%.
- According to the results of the fourth economic census, the Municipal Bureau of Statistics revised the preliminary accounting of gross domestic product in 2018. The revised gross product of Laoshan District is 75.455 billion yuan, of which 832 million yuan is the added value of the primary industry, 23.465 billion yuan is the added value of the secondary industry, 51.158 billion yuan is the added value of the tertiary industry, and the ratio of the three industries is 1.1:31.1:67.8.
- In 2020, the gross domestic product of Laoshan District was 88.642 billion yuan, at comparable prices, an increase of 5.5% over the previous year. By industry, the primary industry added value of 594 million yuan, down 10.6%; secondary industry added value of 26.419 billion yuan, an increase of 2.2%; tertiary industry added value of 61.629 billion yuan, an increase of 7.3%. During the "13th Five-Year Plan" period, the average annual growth rate of gross domestic product is 7.9%, and the structure of the three industries is adjusted from 1.0:36.7:62.3 in 2015 to 0.7:29.8:69.5 in 2020.

== Social business ==
=== Education ===
In 2016, there were 111 kindergartens of all kinds at all levels in Laoshan District, of which 68 were public and 43 were private; among them, 13 and 26 were provincial and municipal model gardens. There are 35 public primary and secondary schools, including 8 middle schools, 5 and 2 provincial and municipal standardized schools; 25 elementary school, including 12 and 11 provincial and municipal standardized schools; 1 nine-year consistent school; and 1 special education municipal standardized school. There are 4 private primary and secondary schools and 4 adult education centers.

There are 30,592 primary and secondary school students, 12,257 children in school, and 2,753 teaching staff. The enrollment rate and consolidation rate of students in compulsory education in the region have always been 100%, and the enrollment rate of high school section has reached over 99%.

There are 4 universities in the region, including China Ocean University, with more than 100,000 students and teachers. There are 4 academician expert workstations in Qingdao, 9 national post-doctoral workstations, 26 academicians of the two academies and external academicians; 32 people from the Thousand Talents Plan of the Chinese Academy of Sciences and 112 Taishan scholars have been introduced; there are more than 70 R&D institutions at home and abroad.

Laoshan University

- Qingdao University of Science and Technology (Laoshan Campus)
- Qingdao University (Fushan Campus, Jinjialing Campus)
- Ocean University of China (Fushan Campus, Laoshan Campus)

== Laoshan tea ==
Laoshan is known for its green tea. Its unique character is a result of the tea plants being grown at a higher latitude than any other tea within China. The high latitude makes it more difficult for the tea plants to grow which gives the tea a more complex taste.

== Education ==
Laoshan District is home to over 65 schools and institutions of higher education. It is host to three major universities, most notably the main campus of both the Ocean University of China and the Qingdao University of Science and Technology, as well as a branch campus of Qingdao University.

Notable secondary and international schools include Qingdao No.2 Middle School, Qingdao Amerasia International School, Overseas Chinese School, International School of Qingdao, and Qingdao Senior Vocational School.
