= Knightsbridge Schools International Bogotá =

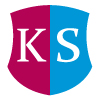
- Bogotá; Colombia

Information
- Type: Private International Day School
- Motto: Be all you can be
- Established: 2012
- Principal: Adriana Carvajalino
- Enrollment: 150
- Average class size: 12
- Student to teacher ratio: 5:1
- Website: ksi-bogota.com

Knightsbridge Schools International Bogotá, also known as KSI Bogotá, is a bi-lingual, co-educational, private international day school for students aged 3–18, based upon the British educational system, located in Guaymaral, close to Chia, in the Bogotá savanna.

The school is part of Knightsbridge Schools International (KSI), a group of international schools based in Colombia, Montenegro, and the United Kingdom, directly affiliated with Knightsbridge School in London, offering non-denominational, multicultural, small-group instruction.

== History ==
KSI Bogotá was formerly known as Colegio La Candelaria, a private catholic school for girls founded by Elvira Arbelaez de Pardo in 1966. In 2012 the Knightsbridge Group added it to its network of international schools, creating KSI Bogotá, introducing bilingualism, co-education, and the International Baccalaureate educational programs.

== Curriculum ==
KSI Bogotá is accredited to teach the International Baccalaureate programmes and is an IB World School. The school provides the IB Primary Years Programme and IB Diploma Programme. The curriculum is made up of six subject groups and the DP core, comprising theory of knowledge (TOK), creativity, activity, service (CAS) and the extended essay. In addition to the IB core requirements, KSI Bogota offers these subjects: DP Mathematics Analysis and Approaches and Applications and Interpretations, DP Global Politics, DP Biology, DP Physics, DP Chemistry, DP English A and B, DP Spanish A and B, DP Business and Management, DP History, DP Film, DP Psychology, and DP Visual Arts.

KSI Bogotá has been categorized as "Muy Superior" in its ICFES classification, one of the highest classifications of schools in Colombia. In 2019 the school was accredited by Great Place To Study, a certification recognizing schools with a strong positive culture, measuring the overall happiness of students, staff and parents.

== House System ==
Knightsbridge Students are sorted into one of four houses to develop belonging and healthy competition in sports and academic activities:

| House | Colour |
|---|---|
| Walton | Blue |
| Milner | Red |
| Lennox | Yellow |
| Ovington | Green |

== Social - Emotional Learning ==
The school offers personalized Social-Emotional Education, facilitating life skills development and school-based mental health at all levels.

== Language programmes ==
The main languages of instruction are English and Spanish. The school offers comprehensive ESL and SSL programs aimed at international students from non-English or Spanish speaking countries
