= International School of Qingdao =

- 青岛卓义外籍人员子女学校
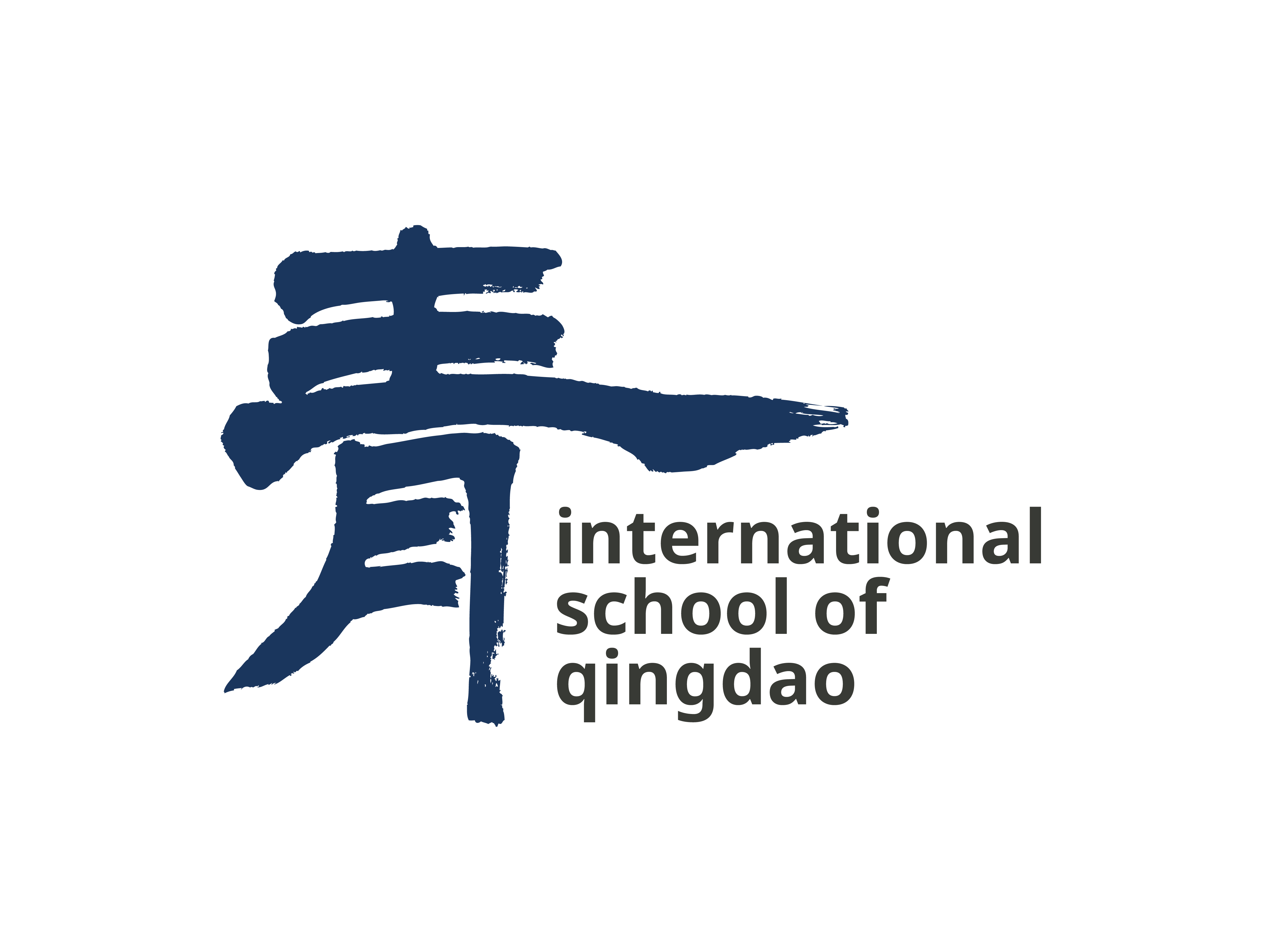
- International School of Qingdao logo

Location
- No. 26 Tianshui Road; Licang District, Qingdao, Shandong, China, 266041
- Coordinates: 36°11′42″N 120°30′21″E

Information
- Type: International school, private school, day school
- Established: 1996
- Head of school: Gabe Lee
- Grades: Pre-Kindergarten through Grade 12
- Age range: 3-18
- Enrollment: 280
- Average class size: 12 students
- Campus type: Private campus
- Colors: Navy and white
- Slogan: We Learn, We Love and We Lead
- Athletics conference: QISN, LifePlus
- Mascot: Dolphins
- Annual tuition: 2024-2025 School Year Early Childhood: ¥143,400 Elementary School ¥205,000 Middle School: ¥218,100 High School: ¥221,700
- Website: isqchina.com
- A LifePlus International School

The International School of Qingdao, colloquially known as ISQ (Chinese: 青岛卓义外籍人员子女学校; pinyin: Qīngdǎo Zhuoyi Waiji Renyuan Zinv Xuéxiào), is a private, independent, co-educational, tuition-based international school located in Qingdao, China, serving the city's expatriate community and educating children age 3 through 12th grade. A North American, college preparatory curriculum is offered with English as the language of instruction.

Founded in 1996 with eight students, enrollment has steadily increased, reaching over 270 students by 2023. That year, the student body was 44% Korean, 25% American, 4%, Canadian, 2% French, and 25% other. A total of 23 countries were represented.

== Organization ==
International School of Qingdao is part of LifePlus Worldwide Learning, which serves more than 2,000 students, most of whom are the children of foreign nationals and expatriates working for companies in China.

== Accreditations ==
International School of Qingdao is accredited with Cognia, in the United States. International School of Qingdao is a member of the East Asia Regional Council of Overseas Schools. (EARCOS)

== History ==
The International School of Qingdao, formerly known as QMIS, was established by LifePlus, a non-profit corporation committed to educational work in China. This includes establishing international schools for expatriate children and promoting cultural understanding and exchanges. International School of Qingdao was the second of seven schools to be established under the LifePlus. International School of Qingdao obtained licensing from the Qingdao Education Commission in June 1996 and the National Education Ministry on September 23, 1996, making it the first international school in Qingdao and Shandong.

When the International School of Qingdao began in the fall of 1996, there were eight students in kindergarten through fourth grade. The school was housed in three classrooms with an office and restrooms on the second floor of the back wing of the No. 1 Middle School of High Tech Park. The school grew to thirteen students by the end of the first academic year, and by the end of the second year, the growing student population necessitated that the school be relocated. In August 1998, the International School of Qingdao moved to the fourth floor of the Children's Club at the Qingdao Children's Activity Center, No. 6 Donghai Road. The steady increase in enrollment required the school once more to acquire more classroom and office space at the activity center.

Because of its continued growth, International School of Qingdao again relocated to a larger campus. International School of Qingdao started its 2007–2008 academic year on a new campus in the Laoshan district. The school's current campus is located in the Licang district of Qingdao, at No. 26 Tianshui Lu. The school moved to this new campus in 2017.

== Timeline ==
- 1996
  - QMIS* is founded by the non-profit Management Technologies International
- June 1996
  - QMIS receives its licensing from Qingdao Education Commission
- September 1996
  - QMIS receives its licensing from the National Education Ministry
- Summer 1998
  - QMIS moves to a campus at the Qingdao Children's Activity Center
- Summer 2007
  - QMIS moves to a larger campus in the Laoshan district. They shared the campus with a local Chinese school named Baishan.
- Summer 2010
  - QMIS changes its name to "International School of Qingdao".
- Summer 2017
  - International School of Qingdao moves to a new campus in the Licang district.
  - International School of Qingdao renews its WASC accreditation

*International School of Qingdao was known as QMIS until the 2010–11 school year.

== Campus ==
International School of Qingdao began the 2017–2018 academic year on a new campus in the Licang District. It is the only international school in Qingdao with its own campus. The new facility has over 50 classrooms, an auditorium, two playgrounds, a soccer field, a computer lab, a basketball /volleyball court, and a library.

=== Previous campuses ===
International School of Qingdao has had three previous campuses. The first was at No. 1 Middle School of High Tech Park where International School of Qingdao used only three classrooms, some office space, and a set of restrooms. The second was at the Children's Club at the Qingdao Children's Activity Center, No. 6 Donghai Road. Throughout their time there, the school would acquire more space as needed. The third campus was at Baishan School in the Laoshan District. While a much larger and more accommodating campus, International School of Qingdao shared the space with Baishan School, the boarding school that owned the property. The Baishan campus boasted a soccer field, a smaller soccer field, a track, an outdoor stage, two playgrounds, a gym, an auditorium, a cafeteria, a kiln, two computer labs, two libraries, and a pool.

== Faculty and staff ==
International School of Qingdao has over 70 faculty and staff members from ten different countries, which include the United States, the United Kingdom, Canada, South Korea, and South Africa. The average years of experience for teachers at International School of Qingdao is 12 years and 51% of the faculty have a master's degree or higher. Some pursue a master's while teaching.

== Student body and class size ==
=== Student body ===
Since its establishment, the International School of Qingdao's students have come from a wide variety of countries, including India, the United States, Canada, South Korea, Japan, United Kingdom, Denmark, Sweden, Germany, Italy, Switzerland, Austria, France, Greece, Singapore, Russia, Philippines, and New Zealand.

=== Average Class size ===
- ECC (Ages 3–6): 9
- Elementary School: 13
- Middle School: 10
- High School: 14

== Curriculum overview ==
=== English ===
All students in take foundational English classes. Students begin with focusing on spelling and grammar, then transition to reading novels and writing essays as they approach high school. High school students are required to have four credits of English. In addition to standard high school English classes, the school offers two AP English classes: Lit and Lang, with each being offered every other year.

==== ELS ====
Students who are new to the English language are required to take ELS in place of taking Chinese classes. This is offered for students in grades 1 through 8. By high school, a student's English level must be sufficient for them to join regular English classes and learn Chinese or another foreign language when offered.

=== Foreign language ===
All students in grades 1 through 8 are required to study Chinese. The only exception is ELS students, who also take ELS classes in place of foreign language. In elementary, there are five levels of Chinese. In middle school, there are five levels of Chinese. In high school, students must obtain two credits of a foreign language. International School of Qingdao also offeres Spanish. AP Chinese is offered and considered the hardest Chinese course that the International School of Qingdao offers. In addition to these Chinese courses, Beginner Chinese, Intermediate Chinese, and Advanced Chinese are also offered.

=== Mathematics ===
Students in elementary study traditional elementary math. In middle school, students begin with either math 6 or pre-algebra (depending on where they place on an evaluation exam) and by 8th grade will have progressed to either algebra I or geometry. In high school, students begin their freshmen year with either geometry or algebra II. For older high school students, pre-calculus, AP Calculus AB, AP Calculus BC, AP Statistics, Intro to statistics, and advanced calculus are offered.

=== Physical education / health & wellness ===
Students in grades 1-8 are required to take a general physical education class. Middle school also requires some variation of a traditional health class every year. In high school, a total of two credits are required.

=== Science ===
Middle school students take a combination of integrated sciences – life, earth, and physical. For high school students, 3 credits of science are required. High school students are able to take biology, chemistry, physics, AP biology, AP physics, AP chemistry, AP environmental science, etc.

=== Social studies ===
The middle school social studies curriculum includes a very entry-level study of world history and geography. High school students must complete three credits of Social Studies, and one must be either AP Economics or economics/government. For freshmen, world history is required. Other high school students may choose between AP World History, AP Macroeconomics, AP Microeconomics contemporary history, AP Psychology, or AP Human Geography.

=== Fine arts ===
Students in elementary take art and music classes. In middle school, students are offered the choice of art, band, choir, drama, or, among other electives. In high school, students are required to obtain one art credit before graduating. International School of Qingdao offers art, drama, choir, and band.

=== AP courses ===
International School of Qingdao offers AP courses and as well as AP online courses through LifePlus Academy for students.

== Student life ==
Students in high school enjoy friendly grade competitions.

== Grading scale and GPA ==
The GPA scale used by the International School of Qingdao is on a 4.0 grade scale.

Numerical grade	Letter grade	GPA points
98-100	A+	4.0
93-97	A	4.0
90-92	A-	3.7
88-89	B+	3.3
83-87	B	3.0
80-82	B-	2.7
78-79	C+	2.3
73-77	C	2.0
70-72	C-	1.7
68-69	D+	1.3
63-67	D	1.0
60-62	D-	0.7
Below 60	F	0.0
