= Knightsbridge Schools International Panama =

Coordinates: 9.0778°N 79.4718°W

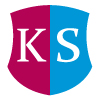
- Panama City; Panama

Information
- Type: Private International Day School
- Motto: Be all you can be
- Established: 2013
- Principal: McArthur
- Website: ksi-panama.com

Knightsbridge Schools International Panama, also known as KSI Panama, was a bi-lingual, co-educational, private international day school for students aged 3-18. The school was located in Panama City.

The school was part of Knightsbridge Schools International (KSI), a group of international schools based in Colombia, Montenegro, Switzerland and Portugal, and was affiliated with Knightsbridge School in London.

The school was an invitational member of the Association of American Schools in South America. The school closed permanently in late 2020 during the COVID-19 pandemic.

== Curriculum ==
KSI Panama was accredited to teach the International Baccalaureate programme and is an IB World School. The school offered the IB Primary Years Programme, IB Middle Years Programme and IB Diploma Programme.

== Language programmes ==
The main languages of instruction were English and Spanish.
