= Oregon Trail Academy =

Location
- 36225 SE Proctor Rd. Boring, Oregon 97009; United States
- Coordinates: 45.4545°N 122.2897°W

Information
- Type: Public Charter School/IB Charter School
- Opened: 2009
- School district: Oregon Trail School District
- Superintendent: Aaron Bayer
- Principal: Debbie Johnson
- Faculty: 15 (on FTE basis)
- Grades: K to 12
- Gender: coed
- Enrollment: ~300 (as of 2016-2017)
- Campus type: Suburban
- Colors: Black, blue, and white
- Mascot: Timberwolf
- Newspaper: OTA Newsletter
- Yearbook: OTA Yearbook
- Website: http://oregontrailschools.com/ota/

Oregon Trail Academy is a K–12 school in Boring, Oregon. It is part of the Oregon Trail School District. It is an International Baccalaureate school.
