= Stratford Hall (school) =

Independent school in Vancouver, British Columbia

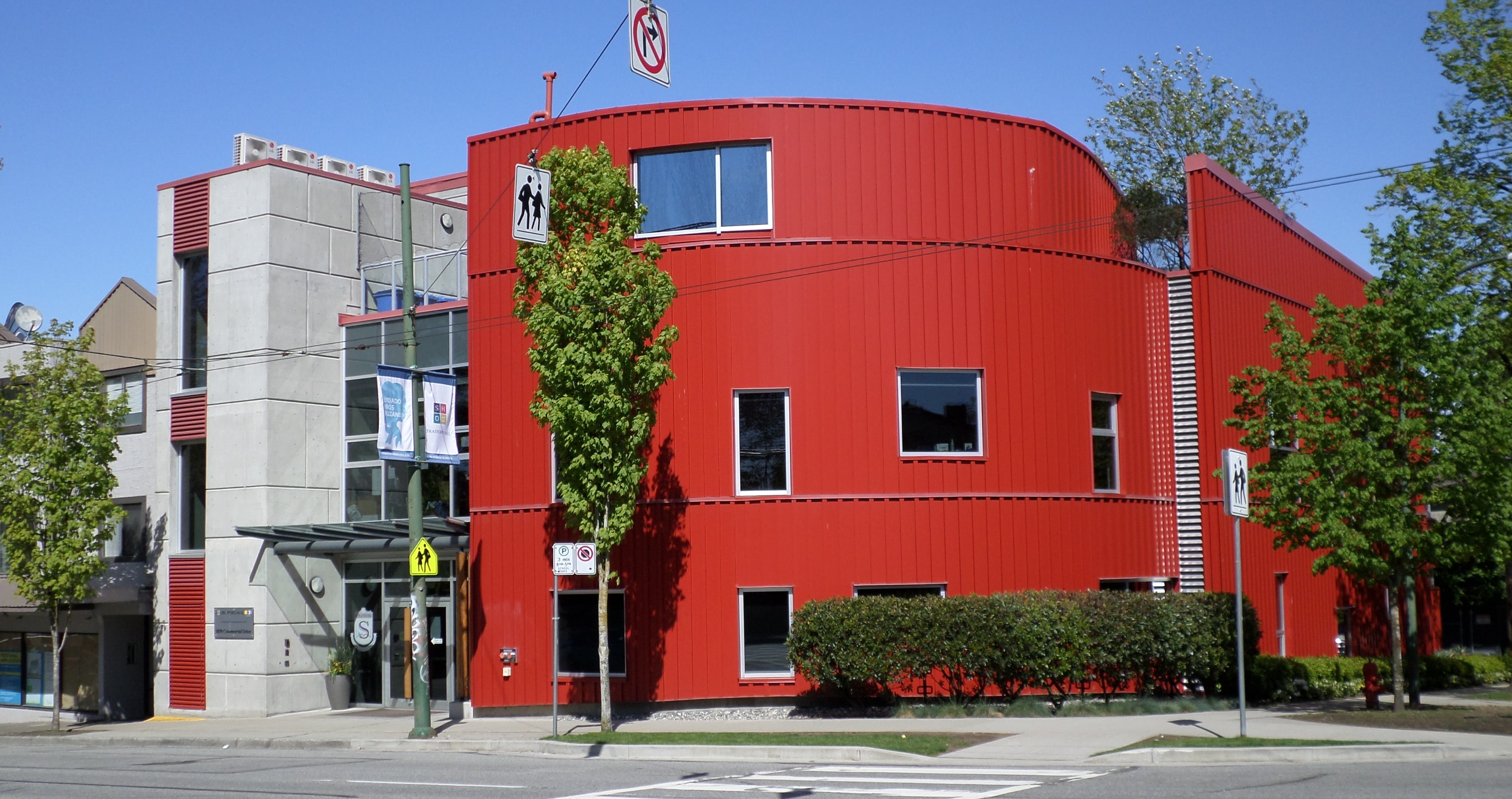
- One of the buildings of Stratford Hall in 2017

Location
- 3000 Commercial Drive; Vancouver, British Columbia, V5N 4E2; Canada; 49.25763°N 123.06954°W

Information
- School type: Independent IB
- Founded: 1990
- Head of School: Richard Kassissieh
- Grades: K-12
- Enrollment: 535
- Language: English with Spanish, French, and Mandarin (not offered in PYP or MYP)
- Area: Vancouver
- Colors: Burgundy Red, Navy Blue, Yellow and Teal
- Team name: Stratford Hall Sabres
- Tuition: Begins at $1,672
- Website: www.stratfordhall.ca

Stratford Hall is an independent, coeducational school located on the east side of Vancouver, British Columbia, Canada. It opened on September 5, 2000. The school teaches the International Baccalaureate Primary Years Programme, the International Baccalaureate Middle Years Programme, and various other Diploma Programmes. Successful graduates obtain an International Baccalaureate (IB) degree that is recognized by many other universities around the world.

Stratford Hall is a private school located on Commercial Drive, with a separate building for each program, red for the Primary Years Programme, blue for the Middle Years Programme, and yellow for the Diploma Programme, with each building’s characteristics designed for the students that use them.

== History ==
Stratford Hall was founded in the late 1990s by two Burnaby mothers who wanted a university preparatory option for their own children. They formed a not-for-profit society, the Burnaby Independent School Society (now the Stratford Hall (School) Society), and in October 1999, they appointed Jim McConnell as Head of School. They also secured a temporary site, the Italian Cultural Centre, which served the school for its first nine years.

Classes began in September 2000; at this point, the school had 40 students from kindergarten to Grade 6. Since then, the school has added approximately 40 new students each year. A second kindergarten class was created in 2001, and in May 2007 the first set of students graduated from Grade 12. Stratford Hall's current enrolment is 511 students from kindergarten to Grade 12 and accepts up to 70 students per year.

The International Baccalaureate Programme was introduced in October 1999. In 2003, the school was awarded authorization for the IB Primary Years Programme, and was the first school in Western Canada to do so. In 2005, it achieved authorization for the IB Diploma Programme, ensuring that its first graduating class would be IB Diploma candidates. It achieved full authorization for the Middle Years Programme in 2009. It is now one of five schools in the Lower Mainland, one of 12 in Canada, and one of 185 in the world to offer the full IB Continuum Programme.

Stratford Hall was accepted into the Independent Schools Association of BC in 2003, and into the Canadian Association of Independent Schools in 2005.

In September 2005, the Grade 6-12 program was moved from the Italian Cultural Centre to its current building, the former Ailanthus Centre on Commercial Drive. The DP Building, located in a facility that formerly housed a performing arts centre for youth, offers its students an enriched academic curriculum, which includes music (e.g. taiko drumming and marimba), visual arts, performing arts (e.g. computer science, theatre, and theatre production), sports science, and outdoor education.

The first Stratford Hall Grade 12 class graduated in May 2007. There were only 6 graduates. The smallest graduating class, consisting of 1 student, graduated in 2008.

In 2007, Stratford Hall purchased a lot on the same block of Commercial, and in 2008, construction began on the new Primary Years facility. The new building, designed specifically for the IB Primary Years Programme, opened in November 2009.

In 2012, construction began on the new Middle Years Programme building for grades 6-10 students, located at 3150 Commercial Drive. This building opened in January 2014. The school has now three distinct buildings, one for each of the IB programmes.

== Athletics and co-curricular programs ==
A few clubs are climbing club, Model United Nations club, cooking club, music (choir, rock band) club, Global Humanitarian Club, debate club, business club and art club.

Beginning in grade 3, students may participate in a number of school teams including cross-country running, soccer, volleyball, basketball, ultimate, track and field and badminton. Stratford Hall is a member of a number of independent school leagues.
