= Qingdao No. 2 Middle School Shandong =

High school in Qingdao, Shandong, China

Coordinates: 36°06′45″N 120°28′47″E

- Chinese: 山东省青岛第二中学

Information
- Established: 1925; 101 years ago
- Enrollment: c.3000
- Area: 264 acres

Qingdao No. 2 Middle School Shandong (Chinese: 山东省青岛第二中学, romanized: Shāndōng shěng qīngdǎo dì èr zhōngxué, lit. 'Qingdao No.2 Middle School, Shandong Province') is a public high school located in Qingdao, Shandong, China. The school was founded in 1925 and was named as a key high school by Shandong Province in 1953.

The school covers an area of 264 acres and is situated on the foothills of Laoshan Mountain. It is equipped with facilities including a science and innovation center, a gymnasium, an athletic field, an art building, and a student dormitory. The school has over 3,000 students.

As the first educational group in Qingdao, Qingdao No.2 Middle School Education Group consists of three member schools: Qingdao No.2 Middle School Academy Harbor Branch, Qingdao No.2 Middle School Branch, and Haier Road School (to be opened in the fall of 2022). The education group leverages the high-quality educational resources of Qingdao No.2 Middle School, innovates its system and mechanism, and explores a cooperative education model that spans regions, stages of education, and ownership. The group has played a leading and demonstrative role in promoting the development of collective education among primary and secondary schools in Qingdao.

== See also ==
- Education in the People's Republic of China
- National College Entrance Examination
- Imperial examination
