= Haut-Lac International Bilingual School =

Coordinates: 46.4742°N 6.8763°E

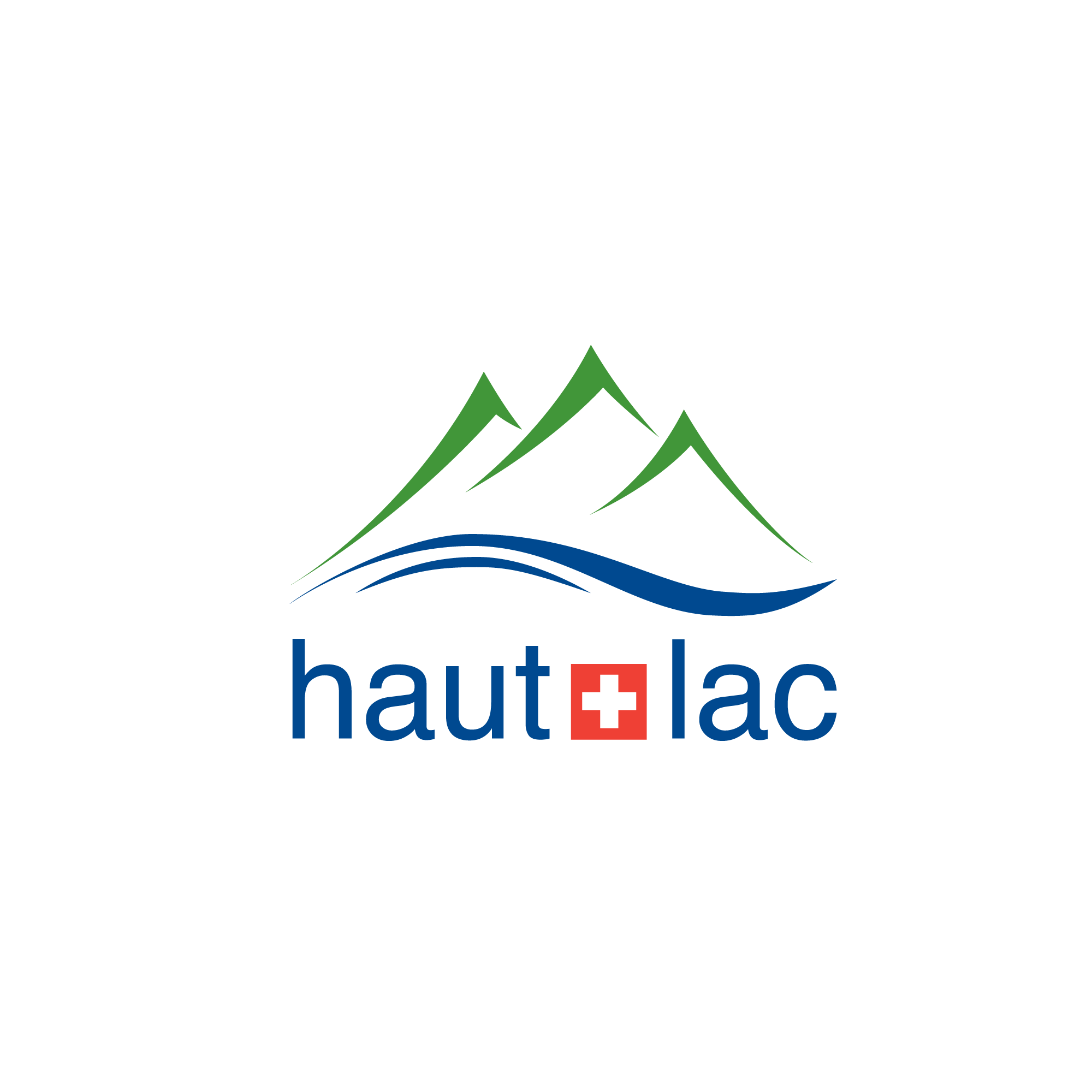

Location
- Chemin de Pangires 26; 1806 Saint-Légier-La Chiésaz, Vaud; Switzerland

Information
- Type: Independent school, Private school, International School, Bilingual school, Boarding school
- Motto: Living, Learning, Achieving
- Established: 1993
- Founder: Anne-Marie and Neil Harwood; Grainne and Jean-Louis Dubler
- Head of Secondary: Rossella Cosso
- Head of Nursery, Infant & Primary: Renaud Milhoux
- Faculty: 160
- Grades: Pre-kindergarten through to grade 12
- Enrollment: 600+ day students 32 boarding students
- Average class size: 15 students
- Language: English & French
- Campus: Praz-Dagoud Campus Roches Grises Campus
- Houses: Bern Bears Jura Jaguars; Fribourg Falcons Valais Vipers
- Colors: Green (infant & primary); Navy blue (secondary)
- Sports: Leisure sports clubs School team sports clubs Inter-house class sports tournaments Sport & study pathway
- Mascot: Bernie
- Accreditation: International Baccalaureate Council of International Schools World Academy of Sport
- Annual tuition: Day school fees: from CHF 21’800 to CHF 40’600; Boarding school fees: from CHF 86’000 to CHF 88’000
- Graduates: 600+
- Website: haut-lac.ch
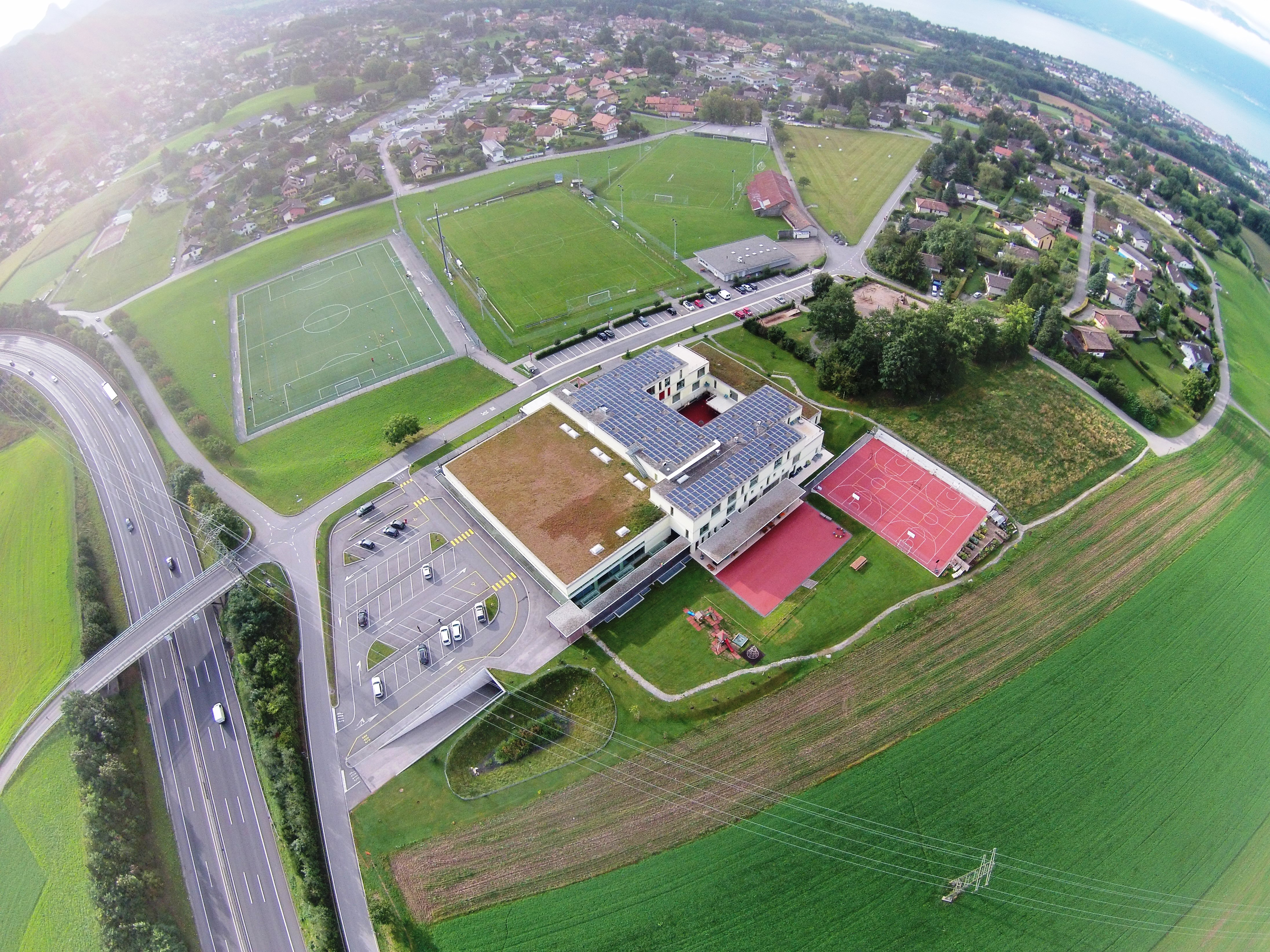

Haut-Lac International Bilingual School is a co-educational international school with uniform for day students aged 3 to 18 and boarders aged 11 to 18.

Its two school campuses and boutique boarding house overlook Lake Geneva in the village of St-Légier-La Chiésaz, which sits just above Vevey on the Swiss Riviera.

The school also runs the Les Marronniers nursery in Vevey for toddlers aged 18 months to 4 years.

== History ==
Haut-Lac International Bilingual School was founded in 1993 by two bilingual couples, Anne-Marie and Neil Harwood and Grainne and Jean-Louis Dubler.

The private school started off in Monts-de-Corsier with 13 students and grew rapidly. It moved to larger premises by Lake Geneva, on Quai Maria-Belgia in Vevey in 1994. By 1999-2000, enrollment had reached 150 students, which led to the opening of a secondary section.

Major campus developments:

- 2001 – Infant students (E1-E3) moved to their own Les Marronniers campus in Vevey
- 2003 – Secondary students (MYP1-3) moved to Roches Grises campus in Saint-Légier-La Chiésaz
- 2014 – Infant, primary and MYP1&2 students moved into the Minergie-certified Praz-Dagoud campus

IB programme authorisations

- 2001 - IB Middle Years Programme (IBMYP)
- 2003 - IB Diploma Programme (IBDP)
- 2020 - IB Career-related Programme (IBCP)

Other notable milestones

- 2011 - First accreditation by the Council of International Schools (CIS).
- 2018 - First Athlete-Friendly Education Centre in Switzerland recognised by the World Academy of Sport
- 2020 - First non-UK school to receive the Primary Science Quality Mark.
- 2022 - The first students are welcomed to the Haut-Lac Boarding House.
- 2023 - Haut-Lac International Bilingual School celebrated its 30th anniversary.
- 2024 - Haut-Lac now welcomes students of over 64 nationalities and has over 600 alumni in Switzerland and worldwide.

== Authorisations & Accreditations ==
=== Swiss ===
Haut-Lac International Bilingual School is official member of the local and Swiss associations below:

- Association Vaudoise des Écoles Privées (AVDEP)
- Federation Suisse des Écoles Privées (FSEP)
- Swiss Group of International Schools (SGIS)
- Association des Directeurs d'Instituts de Suisse Romande (ADISR)
- Eco-Schools

=== International ===
Haut-Lac International Bilingual School is authorised or accredited by the organisations and associations below:

- International Baccalaureate (IB)
- Council of International School (CIS)
- World Academy of Sport (WAoS)
- New England Association of Schools and Colleges (NEASC)

== Campus and Facilities ==
Haut-Lac operates across three campuses in the canton of Vaud, serving students from 18 months to 18 years. The main school campuses, Praz-Dagoud and Roches Grises, and the boarding house are within walking distance of each other in Saint-Légier-La Chiésaz. The Les Marronniers nursery is located near the train station in Vevey.

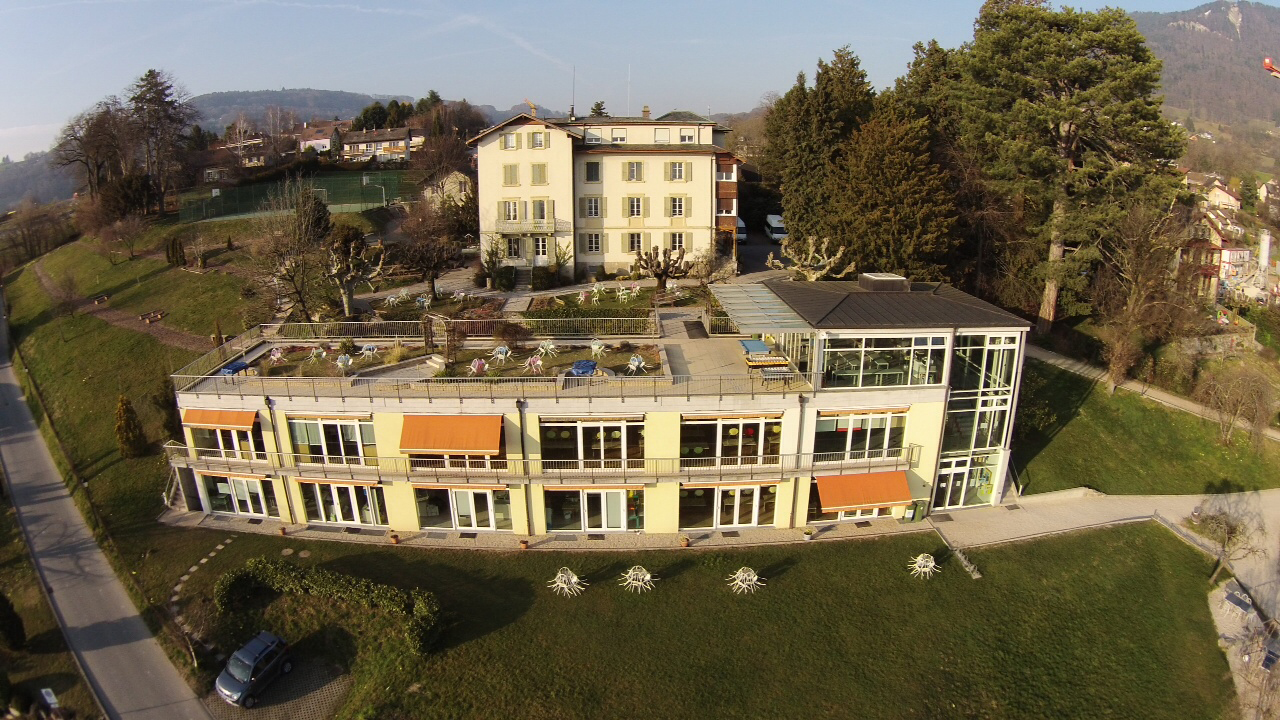
Haut-Lac Secondary School Roches Grises Campus

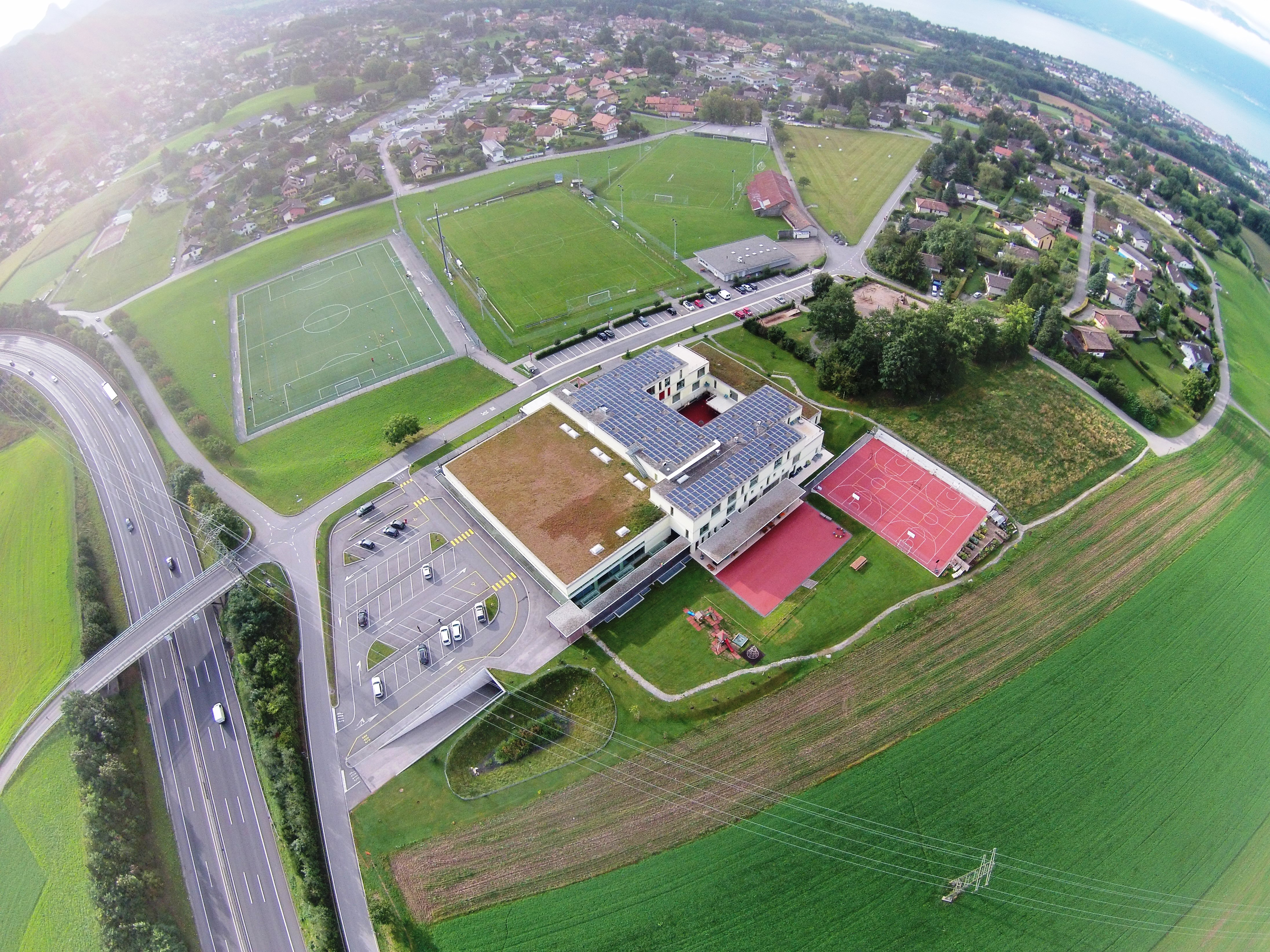

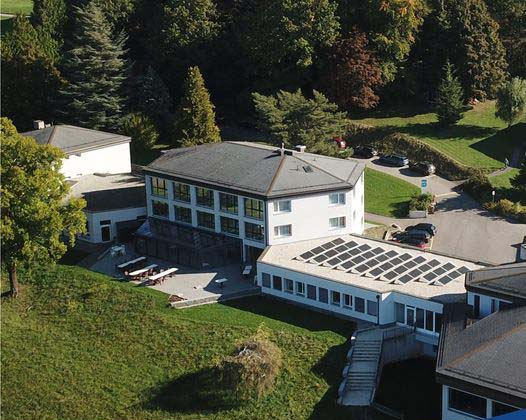
Haut-Lac boarding house
