= Trondheim International School =

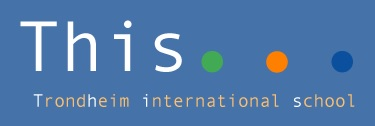

Location
- Trondheim; Norway
- Coordinates: 63°25′45″N 10°24′48″E

Information
- Type: Private
- Established: 2004
- Head of school: Bjørn Ivar Midjo
- Faculty: 40
- Enrollment: (approx.) 230

== About ==
Trondheim International School ("THIS") was founded in 2004 as an alternative to the Norwegian schools and became an International Baccalaureate World School in 2008.

Trondheim International School welcomes students from both Norway and abroad. With a capacity of 230 students across 10 grade levels, the school is supported by a diverse team of 40 staff members from international backgrounds. Our vibrant school community represents over 30 languages, fostering a truly global learning environment.

The school is ideally located near Kristiansten Fortress, just a short walk from the center of Trondheim. This setting offers students numerous opportunities to extend their learning beyond the classroom—whether by exploring the surrounding green spaces or engaging with the city's diverse cultural and educational resources as Norway’s capital of science and technology.

== The IB Curriculum ==
The IB (International Baccalaureate) is a globally recognized educational program designed for students aged 3 to 19, known for its strong academic standards since its establishment in 1968. The program stands out for its emphasis on critical thinking, inquiry-based learning, and challenging assumptions. Rooted in a holistic approach, the IB fosters intercultural understanding and respect, with the ultimate goal of contributing to a more peaceful world through education.

THIS implements the Primary Years Programme (PYP) and the Middle Years Programme (MYP). While each program is tailored to different age groups, they share the same educational philosophy. The PYP focuses on building foundational knowledge and nurturing curiosity, while the MYP strengthens critical thinking skills and prepares students for high school and further studies.

The IB framework is designed as a continuum, transitioning seamlessly from the PYP to the MYP and ultimately to the Diploma Programme (DP). To support this progression, THIS maintains communication with the IB Diploma Programme at Trondheim Cathedral School, ensuring continuity for students who wish to pursue the full IB pathway.

== Norwegian at THIS ==
Proficiency in Norwegian is essential for understanding Norwegian culture and integrating socially. To support this, THIS offers a dual-track program in Norwegian: Norwegian Language Acquisition and Norwegian Language and Literature, spanning from Grade 1 through Grade 10.

Baseline assessments determine the appropriate track for each student upon entry and are conducted regularly to ensure smooth progression. Students transition from Language Acquisition to Language and Literature as soon as they are ready. Our students consistently demonstrate strong progress in Norwegian, frequently achieving results well above local and national averages in National Tests and excelling in their studies at Norwegian high schools.

== Norwegian IB Schools (NIBS) ==
Trondheim International School is a proud member of NIBS, a community of internationally minded educators. Founded in 2011, NIBS serves the following purposes;

- Facilitating collaboration between all IB schools in Norway, from primary to upper secondary level.
- Acting as a referring body on matters related to the accreditation of IB students' qualifications within the national education system and their admission to Norwegian universities and colleges.
- Representing IB World Schools in Norway in discussions that affect their interests.
- Serving as a resource for schools interested in establishing an IB programme.

As the IB community in Norway continues to grow, schools remain united in the belief that education can contribute to a better world. Administrators, programme coordinators, and teachers collaborate to promote the IB nationally, share best practices, and learn from one another. NIBS hosts an annual meeting where coordinators and school leaders come together to discuss relevant developments and strengthen the network of IB schools in Norway.

In 2019, NIBS was officially recognized by the IB as an Association of IB World Schools.
