= Lyford Cay International School =

Location
- New Providence, Bahamas
- Coordinates: 25°01′58″N 77°31′00″W

Information
- Type: Private
- Established: 1962
- Principal: Audrius Barzdukas
- Grades: Nursery to 12th Grade
- Enrollment: 350
- Colours: Turquoise and Gold
- Newspaper: PenDragon
- Website: lcis.bs

Lyford Cay International School is an independent, non-denominational day school, for students in kindergarten to year 12, offering a full International Baccalaureate Programme. It is located on New Providence island in the Bahamas in the gated community Lyford Cay.

== History ==
Lyford Cay International School (LCIS) was founded in 1962 by Canadian entrepreneur E.P. Taylor, to provide an elementary school for children of his employees on the island.

Its initial enrollment was just 9 students and 2 teachers, Tom Miller and his wife Francis Miller - but by 1981 these figures had grown to 147 and 9.

=== Early learning centre ===
Between 1994 and 1997, the school experienced a period of significant development with the opening of an early learning centre and an expanded elementary school.

=== Secondary school ===
In 2003, the school expanded further to include a secondary school. The school's first senior class graduated in 2006. The school had plans to build a new secondary school campus in 2019.

== Current ==
The school has a total student body of 350. Students come from 24 countries, with 35% of the student population being from the Bahamas.

Recent improvements to the school's facilities include installation of a six lane 25-meter competitive swimming pool.

The school has also introduced enhancements to its curriculum, particularly in music and mathematics as well significant expansion of the school's ICT infrastructure, including the introduction in October 2006 of a 1:1 laptop initiative for students Grade 7 to 12.

== Sports ==
The school's principal sports are swimming and soccer.

== Accreditation ==
=== International Baccalaureate ===
Lyford Cay International School is a fully accredited IB World School offering the IB Diploma Programme (DP), the IB Middle Years Programme (MYP), the IB Primary Years Programme (PYP) and the IB Career Related Certificate (CP). It received international baccalaureate middle years programme accreditation in 2003. The school has offered the IB diploma programme since February 2004, the IB primary years programme since 2005 and the IB career-related certificate since 2018.

In 2012, it was one of only 191 fully-accredited IB schools in the world. It is also one of a very small number of schools in the Caribbean to offer all four programmes.

=== Other ===
Lyford Cay International School is also accredited by the Council of International Schools and the New England Association of Schools and Colleges.
