= Brockton Preparatory School =

Independent JK–12 school in North Vancouver, British Columbia

Brockton School

Location
- 3467 Duval Road; North Vancouver, British Columbia, V7J 3E8; Canada; 49.340900°N 123.023686°W

Information
- School type: Independent
- Motto: Fidens ~ Enitor ~ Excellere (Believe ~ Strive ~ Excel)
- Founded: 2004
- Head of School: Karen McCulla
- Grades: JK–12
- Enrollment: 285 (March, 2021)
- Language: English
- Colours: Red, Black, White
- Mascot: Grizzly Bear
- Website: brocktonschool.com

Brockton School is a co-educational, independent day school located in the Lynn Valley neighbourhood of North Vancouver, British Columbia, Canada. It offers programming from Junior Kindergarten to Grade 12 and is an authorized International Baccalaureate (IB) World School offering the Primary Years Programme (PYP), Middle Years Programme (MYP), Diploma Programme (DP), and Career-related Programme (CP).

== History and Accreditation ==
Founded in 2004, Brockton is operated by the Brockton Preparatory School Society. The school is accredited by the British Columbia Ministry of Education and is a member of the Federation of Independent School Associations of British Columbia (FISABC).

The school has been recognized by the U.S. Department of State as an option for families posted abroad.

== Programs ==
Brockton offers a globally focused education through the full continuum of IB programmes. In addition to the core academic curriculum, students participate in leadership initiatives, the arts, outdoor education, and experiential learning programs. Unique programs have included initiatives like a World Music program and cross-disciplinary design experiences.

== Community Engagement ==
Brockton emphasizes community involvement through service learning, fundraising events such as the annual gala, and inclusive initiatives like the “Buddy Bench” program to promote friendship among students.

== Reputation ==
Brockton School has been profiled in multiple educational directories and review platforms such as OurKids.net, the Good Schools Guide, and Dun & Bradstreet's company listings.
