= Bina Tunas Bangsa School =

- Pluit, Jakarta; Indonesia

Information
- Type: Private
- Executive Principal: Mr. Ronald Jimenez
- Faculty: 100
- Enrollment: 800
- Average class size: 25 students
- Campus: Urban
- Website: www.btbschool.org

Bina Tunas Bangsa School (BTB School) is a private international school located in Pluit, Jakarta, Indonesia. The School is open to Indonesian and expatriate students with the dominant language of instruction being English, and Mandarin as a second language. BTB School is authorised as an International Baccalaureate (IB) world school since 07 September 2005, offering international curricula under IB standards.

== IB School ==
BTB International School is an authorized IB World School.
