= American International School of Mozambique =

Location
- Rua de Rio Raraga, 266; Maputo; Mozambique
- Coordinates: 25°56′37.2″S 32°36′54.8″E

American International School of Mozambique (AISM) is an American international school in Maputo, Mozambique. The school serves grades K-12. The school follows the International Baccalaureate (IB) Learner's programme, including both the Primary and Middle Year Programmes, and the IB Diploma programme, which is offered to students in grades 11 and 12 in preparation for universities worldwide. As of 2015 the school has almost 600 students from almost 52 countries, with 20% each from the U.S. and Mozambique and the remainder from other countries.

== Notable alumni ==
- Jannah Sonnenschein (born 1996) - Dutch–Mozambican swimmer
