= International School in Genoa =

International school in Italy

Coordinates: 44.393854°N 9.003029°E

Location
- Via Romana della Castagna, 11a Genoa, 16148; Italy

Information
- Established: 1966; 60 years ago
- Grades: Preschool - Grade 12
- Age: 2 to 18
- Website: https://www.isgenoa.it/

International School in Genoa (ISG) is an international school in Genoa, Italy, serving grades reception (2-year-old) through 12. It was first established in 1966.

It became an International Baccalaureate school on December 11, 2000, when it introduced the IB diploma programme (for high school).
