= Festa dos Confederados =

Annual festival in São Paulo, Brazil

Festa dos Confederados is a festival which takes place at the end of April in Santa Bárbara d'Oeste in the state of São Paulo, Brazil. The festival commemorates the history of the Confederados, who were a group of Confederate soldiers fleeing to Brazil to continue practicing slavery after the defeat of the Confederate States of America following the American Civil War, as Brazil was one of the last countries to legally bar slavery. As years have passed, there has been an increase in contention around the holiday, as today many Americans see the Confederate flag as a symbol of historical racism, while many other Americans and Brazilian Confederados see it as a positive part of their heritage.

== History of the Confederados ==
Location of São Paulo, Brazil

In the aftermath of the Civil War, an estimated population between two thousand and four thousand Confederate soldiers immigrated to Brazil, settling in Santa Barbara D'Oeste, São Paulo from 1865 to 1868. Letters have been found between Brazilian consulates and members of the former Confederate States of America following the end of the war expressing interest in Brazil's slave system. This letter exchange provides evidence as to the reason why the Confederates were leaving and that the diplomats were aware that they were coming with the intent of continuing the practice of slavery. Brazil was one of the last countries to abolish slavery, which was finalized in 1888. Analyzing the background of many of the Confederate emigrants, Brazil was not the only option for them. Their wealth, knowledge of transatlantic trade, and connection with Brazilian leaders were what brought them to Brazil. Access to agricultural lands and a steady climate were beneficial to them as they were already familiar with it and knew how to use it to farm to their advantage.

== Location ==
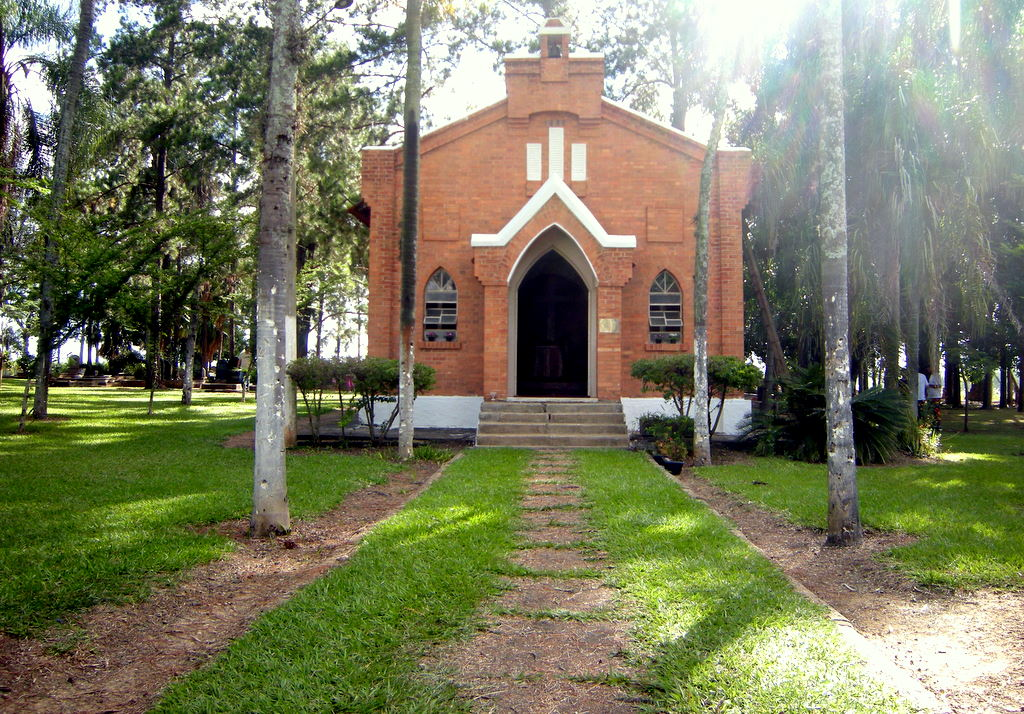
Chapel at Cemitério do Campo

The Festa dos Confederados is hosted at the Cemitério do Campo or the Cemetery of the Field in Sāo Paulo, Brazil. This cemetery is the burial place of many American Confederates that migrated to Brazil.

=== History ===
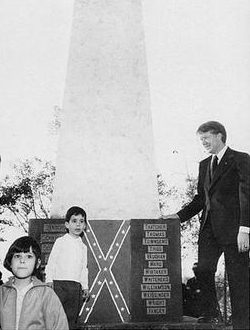
Jimmy Carter with descendants of Confederados at the Confederate Memorial Obelisk

This cemetery was formed in 1867 when Beatrice Oliver, an American immigrant, died. Beatrice Oliver's husband, Colonel Oliver, was unable to bury her body within the municipal cemetery at the time because it belonged to the Catholic Church, of which they were not members. Colonel Oliver laid his wife to rest in land near their home, where she was soon joined by two of Oliver's daughters who passed shortly after Beatrice. Following their burials, Colonel Oliver gave up around one hectare or 2.47 acres of land to the other American immigrants in the area so that they too could bury their dead. The Cemitério do Campo now holds an estimated four hundred to five hundred graves, an ecumenical chapel, and many objects regarding the Confederacy. This includes the Confederate Memorial Obelisk which has carved the names of the first American immigrants to settle in Santa Bárbara d'Oeste, accompanied by the Confederate flag on all four sides. The flag on the memorial is not the only one found on the grounds, as the Cemetery of the Field is home to one of the largest Confederate flags in the world. This giant flag is where many of the festivities for the Festa dos Confederados take place.

=== Caregivers ===
The Cemitério do Campo is now under the care of the American Descendants Brotherhood. This is a group that consists of the descendants of the Americans who first settled in the region in 1866. This association focuses on the maintenance of the cemetery, the immigration history, and encouraging cooperation among the descendants. They have a large role in hosting Festa dos Confederados as well.

== Festival traditions ==
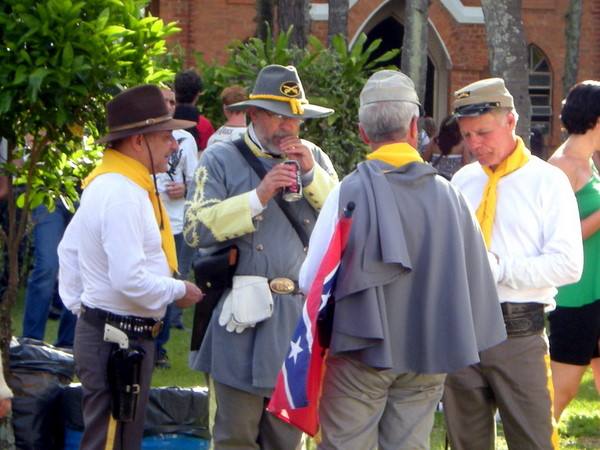
Men in Confederate uniform replicas at Festa dos Confederados

The purpose of Festa dos Confederados is to celebrate the Confederate history and heritage of Santa Barbara d'Oeste. It takes place at Cemitério do Campo in São Paulo, Brazil towards the end of the month of April. Festa dos Confederados contains many aspects that correlate closely with stereotypes that have commonly been associated with United States Southern culture. Thousands of people, including natives and tourists, travel from afar to attend this celebration each year.

Many attendees of this festival dress in replicas of traditional clothing worn during the time period of the Confederacy. This includes Confederate army uniforms and dresses with hoop skirts. The dresses themselves can take months to sew, and some include designs of things that the American immigrants brought to Brazil, including crops. And while these outfits are seen and worn quite commonly at this event, there is no official dress code for those attending. Just as there are some who attend in traditional garb, there are an equal number of attendees in modern clothing. The one thing that is found consistently throughout the outfits and the festival itself is the Confederate flag.

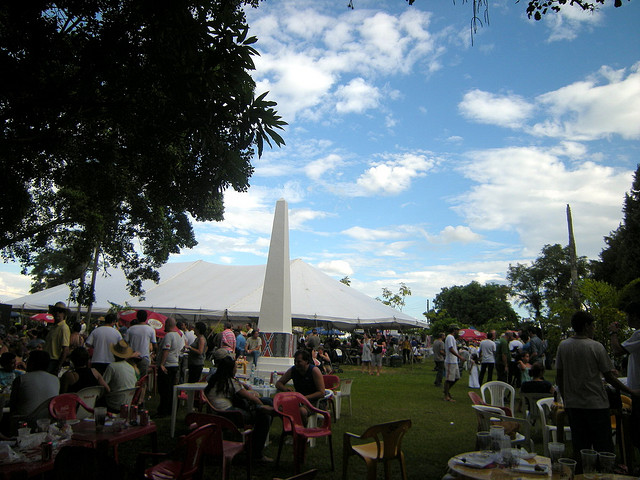
People at Festa dos Confederados

The Confederate flag is a central part of Festa dos Confederados as it is the main form of Confederate representation. Despite the fact that there are many controversies surrounding this symbol, it can still be found on many surfaces around the festival. This includes clothing, booths, gravestones, memorials, and an assortment of items for sale. At the Cemitério do Campo lays one of the biggest Confederate flags, which doubles as a stage for one of the main focuses of the festival: dancing.

People of all ages, most dressed in traditional outfits, participate in a variety of dances to honor Confederate history. Some of those who perform have been dancing at the festival since they were young. As the years have progressed the festival has grown to include old, antebellum-era dances and new, modern line dances. As the wide range of dances suggests, the music at the festival incorporates many different styles such as rock and country.

Booths at the festival at Festa dos Confederados also sell food and vendors tend to follow the Southern stereotype by selling fried chicken, biscuits, and cookies. At each of these booths, the currency accepted is faux Confederate dollar bills. These Confederate dollars are acquired by trading in real currency and receiving faux money in return. Funds made at Festa dos Confederados are put towards the upkeep of the grounds of the cemetery and other miscellaneous causes.

== Native perspective ==
For Brazilians, their interaction with Confederate history is complicated. They reflect on their ancestors and stories that have been passed down to them, but they did not directly participate in the Civil War. They were brought into the history of the war unintentionally as former Confederates fled to the state of São Paulo and began their new lives. Another difficulty for them is interpreting what is real and what is fiction from their complicated heritage. Because the Confederados came to Brazil and adopted new identities, there is misleading information and missing details. When it comes to celebrating Festa Dos Confederados, they are not celebrating what the Confederados did previously before arriving in Brazil, but their ancestors who started a settlement and who they share heritage with.

The historical cemetery shares the same land where the first Baptist church was organized which brought that religion to the area. For a time, both English and Portuguese were spoken in the area.

== Controversies surrounding the holiday ==
In recent years, the United States has taken further actions to remove monuments in relation to Confederate history. In connection with the monuments, more Americans have become concerned that this Brazilian holiday, "celebrates the wrong side of history." Many argue that the display of the Confederate flag throughout the festival is offensive because of the racist connotation that it is connected to. Although the celebration pays tribute to the roots of their heritage, it fails to recognize the confederates association with slavery.

Battle Flag of the Confederate States of America

The Confederate flag is the main symbol of the Civil War that reflects the history of the central conflict and its connection to slavery. Because of its repeated appearance on the holiday, debates about a new law being passed to ban the flags could ultimately lead to a ban on the holiday in general. Other concerns have been expressed that the holiday romanticizes the history of the town and minimizes the atrocities of slavery that the Confederados continued to practice in Brazil. Another layer to the story is although much of the city's population is descended from Confederate immigrants, there is still a large black population who find roots in the slave trade practiced by these immigrants. Their connection to the story is on the other side of the Confederate soldiers. Many people have spoken out about adjusting the holiday. In response, a law was passed by a city councilwoman in the area, Esther Moraes (PL), which prevents public funds from being used for events that display "racist symbols".
