= Senator Norris =

Senator Norris may refer to:

- Edwin L. Norris (1865–1924), Montana State Senate
- George W. Norris (1861–1944), U.S. Senator from Nebraska from 1913 to 1943
- Mark Norris (judge) (born 1955), Tennessee State Senate
- Moses Norris Jr. (1799–1855), U.S. Senator from New Hampshire from 1849 to 1855
- Robert O. Norris Jr. (1880–1960), Virginia State Senate
- William Hutchinson Norris (1800–1893), Alabama State Senate
