= Pérola Byington =

Brazilian philanthropist and social activist (1879–1963)

- Born: Pearl Ellis McIntyre; 3 December 1879; Santa Bárbara d'Oeste, São Paulo, Brazil
- Died: 6 November 1963 (aged 83); New York City, New York, U.S.
- Occupation: Philanthropist
- Spouse: Albert Jackson Byington

Pérola Ellis Byington (born Pearl Ellis McIntyre; 3 December 1879 – 6 November 1963) was a Brazilian philanthropist and social activist. She was an advocate for mother and children's health assistance in Brazil during the first half of 20th century.

== Early life ==
On 3 December 1879, Byington was born as Pearl Ellis McIntyre in Santa Bárbara d'Oeste, São Paulo, Brazil. Byington's parents were Mary Elisabeth Ellis and Robert Dickson McIntyre, American Confederado immigrants who settled in Santa Bárbara d'Oeste. She adopted the Portuguese form of her name (Pérola) and in 1894 when Pérola was fourteen years old, she completed the preparation for the Normal School, but was not admitted because the minimum age requirement was sixteen years old.

== Education ==
Byington received private lessons in education, except Latin, which she took at a boys' school, where Pérola had to hide behind a folding screen so as not to attract the attention of the teacher and the boys. In 1897, Pérola took the entrance exams for the annex course of the Law Academy of São Paulo. She didn't pass the geography test and neither was well received by the academics, who did not want to admit women. In 1899, at the age of 19, Byington finished the normal course.

== Career ==
During the First World War, Byington was in the United States, where she was responsible for a section of the Red Cross. Upon returning to Brazil, she continued participating in philanthropic activities. From the 1930s, Byington alongside the teacher Maria Antonieta de Castro led a campaign to combat child mortality, called "Cruzada Pró-Infância", (Crusade for Childhood) a task which she held for 33 years. She also dedicated herself to several other programs in defense of the disadvantaged, especially children, having been awarded several commendations of merit.

== Personal life ==
On 4 July 1901, Byington married Albert Jackson Byington, an electrical engineer who imported the first electric motor to Brazil. They had two children.

On 6 November 1963, Byington died in New York City, New York, United States.

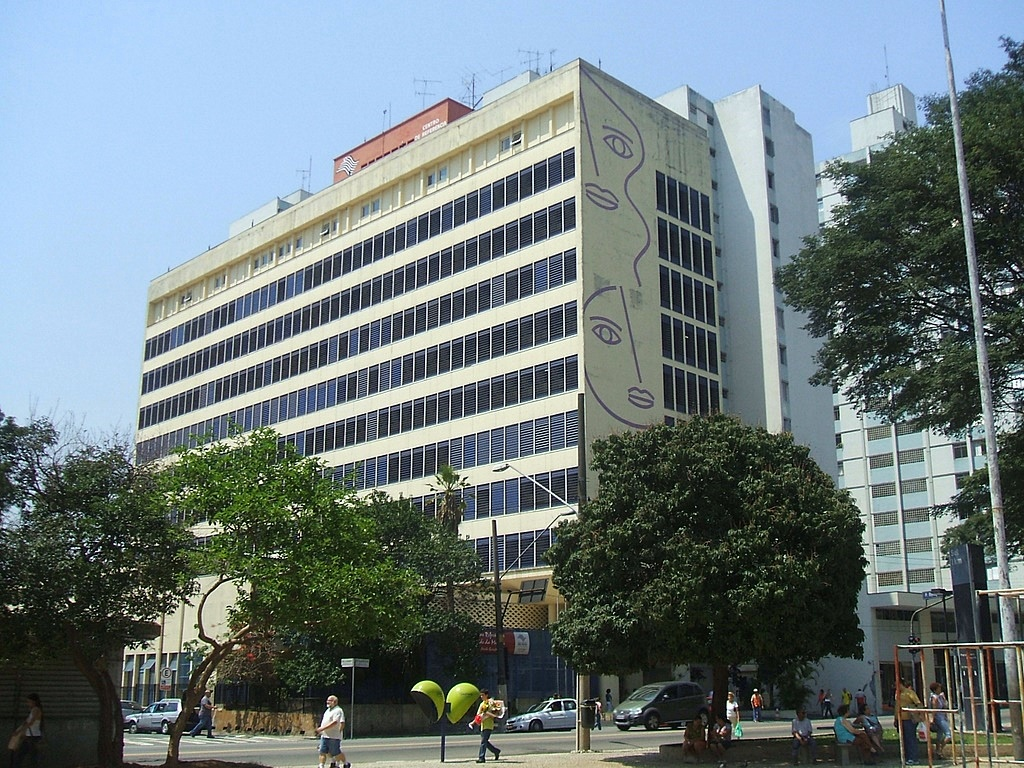
Pérola Byington Hospital, reference center in women's health, in São Paulo, Brazil

=== Legacy ===
In her honor, a hospital dedicated to women's health in São Paulo is named after her.

Pérola, a municipality of the state of Paraná, was named after her; Alberto Byington Júnior, Pérola's son, was one of the partners of the Companhia Byington de Colonização Ltda., the company that bought land and settled in the region.

Byington is the great-grandmother of actress Bianca Byington and singer Olivia Byington. She is also the great-great-grandmother of the actor Gregório Duvivier.
