= Perola =

Perola may refer to:

- Pérola, a municipality in Brazil
- Perola (horse), a Thoroughbred racehorse
- Perola (moth), a genus of insects in the family Limacodidae
