= Confederados =

Brazilians of Confederate American ancestry

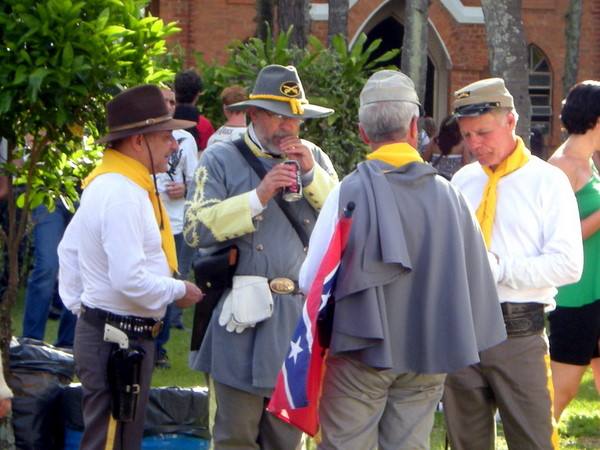
- The Confederados at Festa dos Confederados

Total population
- Thousands of descendants across Brazil

Regions with significant populations
- Americana; Santa Bárbara d'Oeste

Languages
- English (Southern American English); Portuguese

Religion
- Protestantism; Irreligion

Related ethnic groups
- American Brazilians (White Southerners and Black Southerners)

Confederados (Brazilian Portuguese: [kõfedeˈɾadus]) is the Portuguese name for Confederate immigrants, all White Southerners who fled the Southern United States during the Reconstruction era, and their Brazilian descendants. They were enticed to Brazil by offers of cheap land from Emperor Pedro II, who had hoped to gain expertise in cotton farming. The regime in Brazil had a number of features that attracted the Confederados, namely the continued legality of slavery, but also political decentralization and a relatively high commitment to free trade.

It is estimated that up to 20,000 American Confederates immigrated to the Empire of Brazil from the Southern United States after the American Civil War. Initially, most settled in the current state of São Paulo, where they founded the city of Americana, which was once part of the neighboring city of Santa Bárbara d'Oeste. The descendants of other Confederados would later be found throughout Brazil.

The center of Confederado culture is the Campo Cemetery in Santa Bárbara d'Oeste, where most of the original Confederados from the region were buried. Because of their Protestant religion, they could not be buried in a Catholic cemetery, so they created their own cemetery, the first non-Catholic, non-indigenous cemetery in Brazil. The Confederado community has also established a Museum of Immigration at Santa Bárbara d'Oeste to present the history of Brazilian immigration and highlight its benefits to the nation.

The descendants still foster a connection with their history through the Fraternity of American Descendants, an organization dedicated to preserving the unique mixed culture. The Confederados also have an annual festival, called the Festa Confederada, which is used to fund the Campo Cemetery. The festival is marked by Confederate flags, traditional dress of Confederate uniforms and hoop skirts, food of the American South with a Brazilian flair, and dances and music popular in the American South during the Antebellum period.

Although the number of Confederado descendants living in Brazil today is difficult to estimate, in 2016 there were believed to be thousands.

== History ==
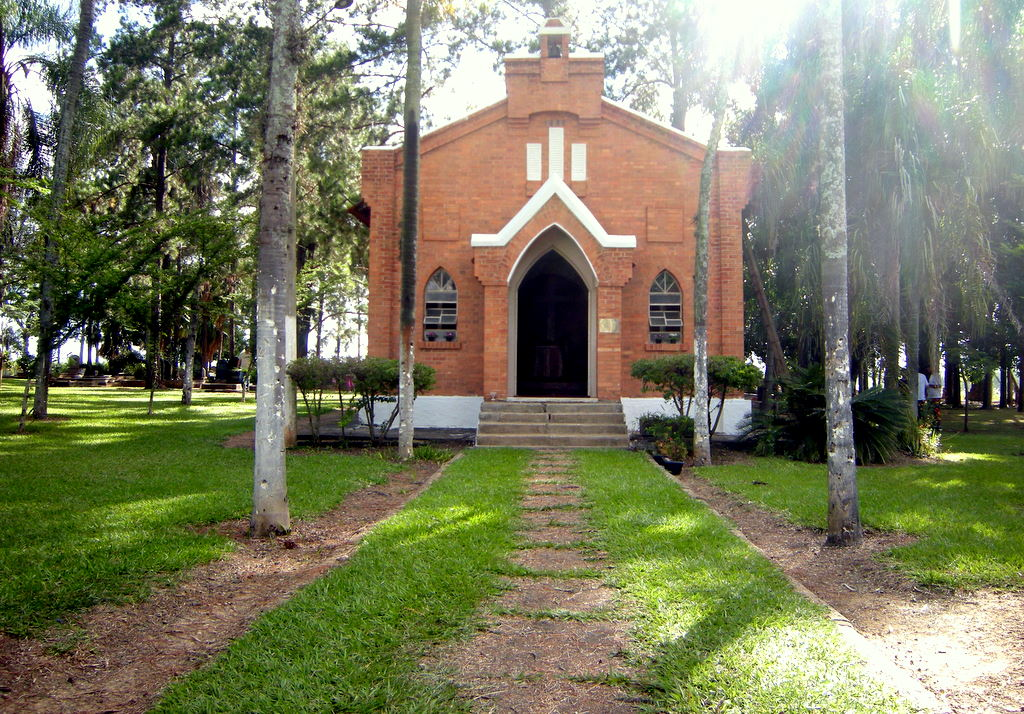
Chapel at Santa Bárbara d'Oeste built by Confederate expatriates

After the war, many Confederate planters were unwilling to live by the new rules imposed by the Union's victory and the constitutional changes that followed: an end to chattel slavery, a new labor regime, and the loss of political power that came with African-American suffrage. Accustomed to raising cotton with the labor of enslaved people, some looked elsewhere in the Western Hemisphere for a place where their old life could be continued. In September 1865 the New Orleans Daily Picayune wrote

Many persons who, from long habit and fondly cherished theories, have become strongly attached to the institution of African slavery, fancy that in Brazil they will find an opportunity for the permanent use of that system of labor — Brazil and the Spanish possessions being the only two slaveholding communities remaining in the civilized world.

The Brazilian Emperor Dom Pedro II saw an opportunity in the economic disruption in the southern United States and hoped to build up its cotton production for export to the looms of England and France, which had long relied on the Deep South. The Emperor encouraged the immigration of cotton planters from the former Confederacy to enable that expansion.

=== Immigration to Brazil ===
Confederate expatriates in Brazil

Even before the end of the war in 1865, there was already talk of immigrating to Brazil, but very little was known about this country. After the war ended, there was such a revival of the issue that several emigration companies were formed. Representatives were sent to Brazil to check the land, climate, and facilities offered by the emperor.

In November 1865, the state of South Carolina formed a colonization society and sent Major Robert Meriwether and Dr. H. A. Shaw, among others, to Brazil to investigate the possibility of establishing a colony. On the way back, they published a report mentioning that two lords had already bought land and settled here. Slaves were cheap, they reported.

A confederate from South Carolina, James McFadden Gaston, traveled extensively in central Brazil. Upon return to the US, Gaston published a book titled Hunting a Home in Brazil in 1867. The book was a guide for would-be colonizers and stated in the introduction, "All the requisites of a desirable home have been found in Brazil."

Many Southerners who accepted the Emperor's offer lost their farms and homes during the war, were unwilling to live under occupation by Federal troops during Reconstruction, or simply did not expect an improvement in the Southern economic situation in the foreseeable future. Furthermore, Brazil would not ban slavery until 1888. The Confederates were the first organized Protestant group to settle in Brazil.

=== Americana and Santa Bárbara d'Oeste ===
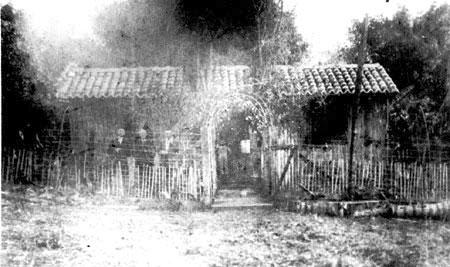
House of the first Confederate expat family in Villa Americana

On December 27, 1865, Colonel and Senator William Hutchinson Norris of Alabama landed in the port of Rio de Janeiro. In 1866, William and his son Robert Norris climbed the Serra do Mar, stopped in São Paulo and speculated on land. They were offered land for free in what is now the neighborhood of Brás, but he did not accept it because it was marshy. They were also offered the land where São Caetano do Sul is today, and they refused it for the same reason. They decided to go to Campinas, but at the time, the railroad went only 10 miles beyond São Paulo while Campinas is 35 miles further, so the Norrises bought an ox-cart and headed for Campinas. They took 15 days to reach the city, and there they stayed for a while looking for land, until they cast their sights on the plain that stretched from Campinas to Vila Nova da Constituição, current Piracicaba.

The Norrises bought land from the Domingos da Costa Machado sesmaria and established themselves on the banks of Ribeirão Quilombo, at the time belonging to the municipality of Santa Bárbara d'Oeste, today the city of Americana. Upon his arrival, Colonel Norris began to give practical courses in agriculture to farmers in the region, interested in cotton cultivation and new agricultural techniques. The plow he brought from the United States caused so much sensation and curiosity that, within a short time, they had a practical agricultural school, with many students who paid him for the privilege of learning and still cultivating their gardens. The Colonel wrote to his family that he had made US$5,000 from that alone. In mid-1867, the rest of his family arrived, accompanied by many relatives. Many Confederados besides Norris became known for agricultural education and improvement of cotton productivity.

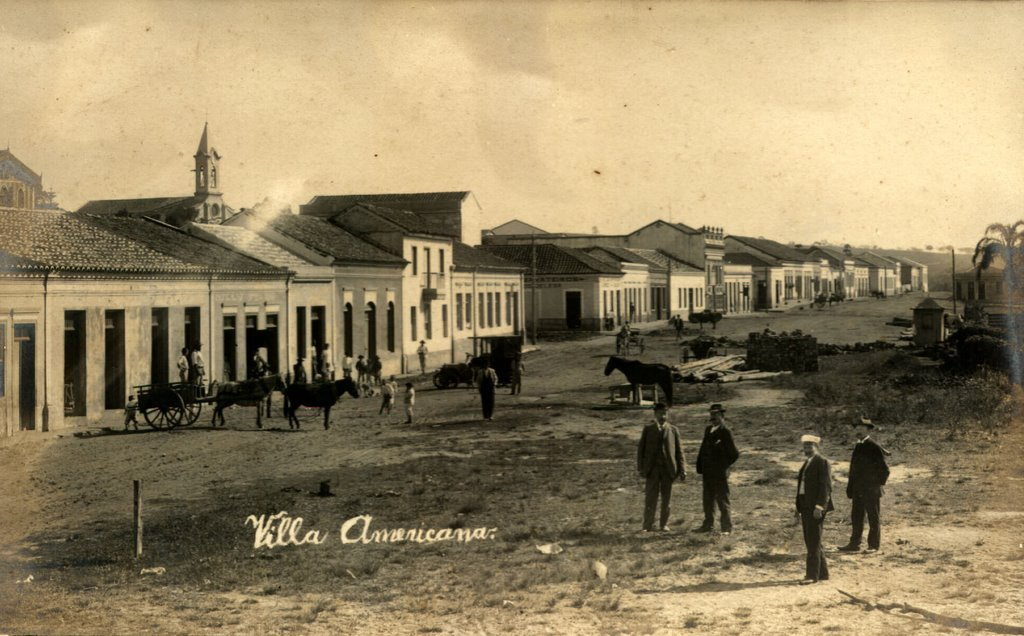
Villa Americana in 1906

Numerous farms were founded by immigrants from the United States, commemorated today at the Santa Bárbara d'Oeste Immigration Museum. Cultivation and processing of cotton were significant. They established an intense trade, notably from 1875 onwards, with the arrival of the railroad and the installation of the Santa Barbara Station by the Companhia Paulista de Estradas de Ferro. Due to the constant presence of these immigrants, the village that was formed in the vicinity of the Station became known as "Vila dos Americanos", or "Vila Americana", and gave rise to the current city of Americana.

The installation of the Carioba factory by the North American engineer Clement Willmot and Brazilian associates, located one mile from the train station, also dates from this period. Manufacturing played a very important role in the foundation and development of Americana. The education of children was one of the priorities for American families, who set up schools on the properties and hired teachers from the United States. The teaching methods developed by American teachers proved to be so efficient that they were later adopted by Brazilian official education.

Religious services were celebrated on the properties by pastors who moved between various properties and the various centers of the American diaspora. In 1895 the first Presbyterian Church^{In Brazil?} was founded in the village of Estação. Due to the prohibition of burying people of other faiths in the cemeteries of cities administered by the Catholic Church, American immigrants began to bury their dead near the farmhouse. This cemetery became known as the Campo Cemetery, currently a tourist attraction in the city of Santa Bárbara d'Oeste. Even today the descendants of American families are buried there. It is in this place that descendants gather periodically for religious ceremonies and parties around the 19th-century chapel.

=== Amazonas ===
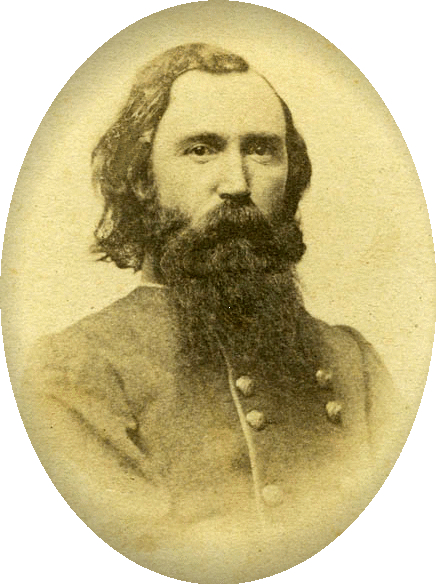
Colonel Archibald Dobbins moved to Santarém in 1867.

Jason Williams Stone, a man from Dana, Massachusetts who moved to Brazil before the American Civil War, made a fortune as a tobacco and rubber farmer. Stone's plantations, which had more than five thousand hectares, were called Colonia Stone. They were located near the city of Itacoatiara, in Amazonas. Many of his descendants still have the surname "Stone". They are found mainly in the cities of Manaus and Itacoatiara, in Amazonas.

=== Pará ===
The city of Santarém, in the state of Pará, received a wave of expatriate families from the American Civil War that took place in the South of the United States. The first to land was the Riker family. In the 1970s, David Afton Riker published a book called The Last Confederate in the Amazon, which chronicles the saga of this migration and life in the new homeland. The Confederates and their descendants became notable in the business and political life of the region.

It is not known how many Confederado immigrants came to Brazil, but unprecedented research in the records of the port of Rio de Janeiro, by Betty Antunes de Oliveira, shows that around 20,000 U.S. citizens entered Brazil between 1865 and 1885.

== Descendants of the Confederados ==
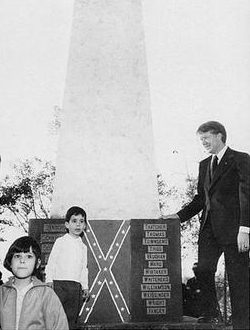
Jimmy Carter, on a visit to Brazil in 1972, stands with fifth-generation Confederado children at the base of the Confederate monument in Americana.

The first generation of Confederados formed a distinct community. As is typical, by the third generation, most families had already intermarried with native Brazilians or immigrants from other origins. Confederados increasingly began to speak the Portuguese language and identify themselves as Brazilians. As the region around the municipalities of Santa Bárbara d'Oeste and Americana became a hub for sugar cane production and society became more mobile, Confederados moved to larger cities in search of jobs in urban areas. Currently, only a few Confederado families still live on land owned by their ancestors. Confederado descendants are spread throughout Brazil. They maintain their organization's headquarters at the Campo Cemetery, in Santa Bárbara d'Oeste, where there is also a chapel and a memorial.

Descendants make a connection to their history through the American Descendant Fellowship, dedicated to preserving immigrant culture. The descendants of the Confederates also hold an annual festival in Santa Bárbara d'Oeste called "Festa Confederada", which is dedicated to funding the Campo Cemetery. During the festival, Confederate flags and uniforms are worn, while Southern American food and dances are served and performed. The descendants maintain affection for the Confederate flag, although they identify themselves as fully Brazilian. Many Confederate descendants traveled to the United States at the invitation of Sons of Confederate Veterans, an organization of American descendants, to visit Civil War battlefields, participate in reenactments, or visit the places where their ancestors lived.

The Confederate flag in Brazil did not acquire the same political symbolism as it has in the United States. After then-Governor Jimmy Carter's visit to the region in 1972, the city of Americana even incorporated the Confederate flag into its coat of arms. (It was removed a few years later under pressure from Italian-descendent residents, as the Confederados now comprise about a tenth of the city's population.) During his visit to Brazil, Carter also visited the city of Santa Bárbara d'Oeste and the grave of a great-uncle of his wife, Rosalynn Carter, at Cemitério do Campo. At the time, Carter noted that Confederate descendants sounded and looked exactly like American southerners.

Today, the Campo Cemetery (and the chapel and memorial located within it) in Santa Bárbara d'Oeste is a memorial, as most of the region's original Confederate immigrants were buried there. As Protestants, they were prohibited by the Catholic Church from burying their dead in local cemeteries and had to establish their own cemetery. The community of descendants also contributed to the Museum of Immigration, also located in Santa Bárbara d'Oeste, to present the history of US immigration to Brazil.

The American immigrants introduced into their new home many new foods, such as pecans, Georgia peanuts, and watermelon; new tools such as the iron plow and kerosene lamps; innovations such as modern dentistry, modern agriculture, and the first blood transfusion; and the first non-Catholic churches (Baptist, Presbyterian, and Methodist). Some foods of the American South also crossed over and became part of general Brazilian culture such as chess pie, vinegar pie, and southern fried chicken. The immigrants also established public schools and provided education to their female children, which was unusual in Brazil at the time.

=== Statistics ===
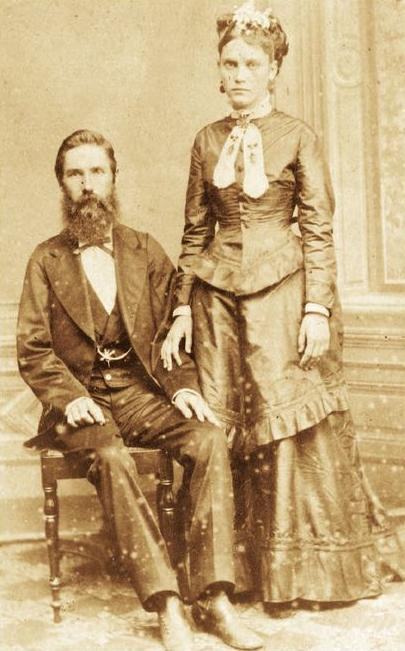
Confederate immigrant couple Joseph Whitaker and Isabel Norris

American immigration to Brazil by State up to January (1867)

State	Immigrants
São Paulo	800
Espírito Santo	400
Rio de Janeiro	200
Paraná	200
Pará	200
Minas Gerais	100
Bahia	85
Pernambuco	85
Total	2,070

The Confederate migrants were some 20,000 Southerners, from 12 southern states (e.g. Arkansas, Alabama, and Mississippi) who preferred the Brazilian wilderness to life under Union rule after the Civil War.

=== U.S. ancestry in Brazil ===
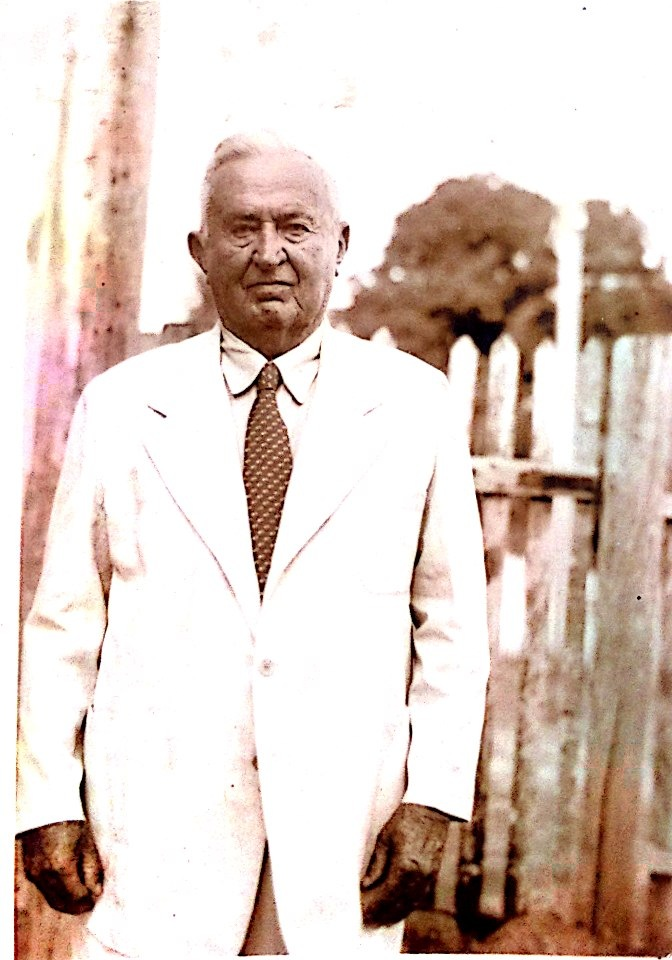
David Bowman Riker

Number of American descendants by state

State	Descendants
São Paulo	100,490
Espírito Santo	50,258
Rio de Janeiro	25,220
Paraná	25,000
Pará	24,800
Minas Gerais	12,610
Bahia	10,686
Pernambuco	10,000
Total	260,000

== In popular culture ==
Yale University history professor Rollin G. Osterweis wrote Santarem, a novel about Confederados.

== Notable Confederados ==
- Ellen Gracie Northfleet – jurist
- Pérola Byington – philanthropist and social activist
- Rita Lee – singer and songwriter, known as the "Queen of Brazilian rock"
- William Hutchinson Norris – Alabama state senator

== See also ==
- Immigration Museum of the State of São Paulo

== Archival material ==
- Auburn University in Alabama maintains a special collection of material related to the Confederado emigration, including correspondence, memoirs, genealogies, and newspaper clippings, especially related to Colonel Norris.
