= Rio Branco Esporte Clube =

Brazilian football club

Rio Branco
- Full name: Rio Branco Esporte Clube
- Nicknames: Tigre de Americana; Alvinegro Americanense; Alvinegro Imponente; O Campeão do Centenário
- Founded: 4 August 1913; 113 years ago
- Ground: Estádio Décio Vitta
- Capacity: 16,000
- League: Campeonato Paulista Série A3
- 2025: Paulista Série A3, 4th of 16
Home colors	Away colors

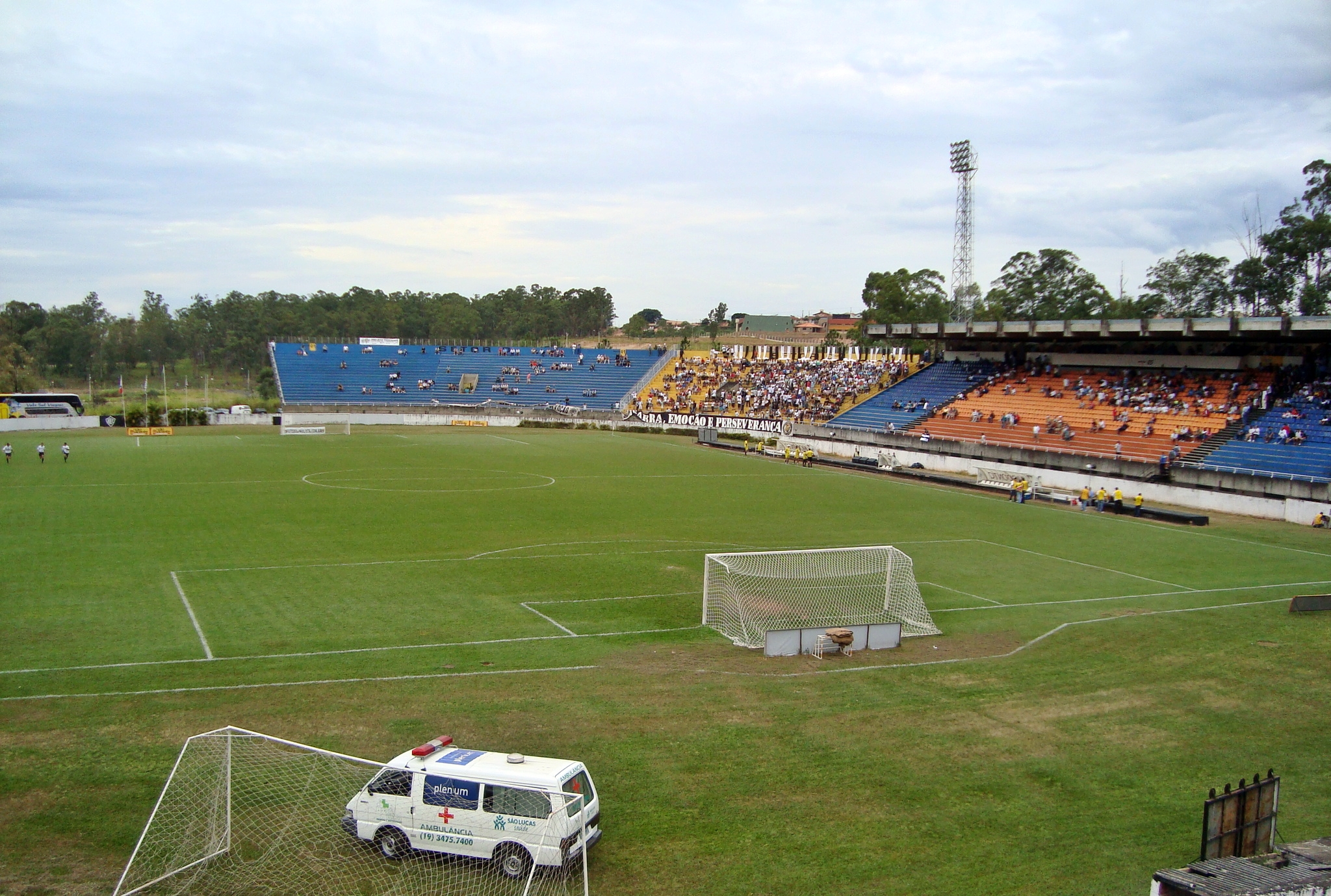
Estádio Municipal Décio Vitta

Rio Branco Esporte Clube, more commonly referred to as Rio Branco de Americana or simply Rio Branco, is a Brazilian football club based in Americana, São Paulo. The team competes in Campeonato Paulista Série A3, the third tier of the São Paulo state football league.

The club's home colours are white and black and the team mascot is a tiger.

== History ==
On 4 August 1913, the club was founded as Sport Club Arromba. Rio Branco's first board of directors was composed by João Truzzi, who was one of the club's founders, and by 26 other people. In 1917, the club was renamed to Rio Branco Football Club, after the Baron of Rio Branco.

In 1922 and in 1923, the club won the Campeonato Paulista do Interior. During the final years of the 1940s, the club's football section was closed.

In 1961, the club's name was translated to the Portuguese language, becoming Rio Branco Futebol Clube. In April, 1979, Rio Branco and another local team, called Americana Esporte Clube, fused, and the club's football section was reactivated.

In 1990, the club was the runner-up of the Campeonato Paulista Second Division, being promoted to the following year's first division. In 1993, Rio Branco finished in the sixth place of Campeonato Paulista, only behind the bigger teams. In 2001, the club finished in the sixth place of Campeonato Paulista again, and almost went to the semifinals. One year after, without the bigger teams of the state, the 'Tiger' obtained the 3rd place of Campeonato Paulista.

Rio Branco Esporte Clube stayed for seventeen years in the first division of Campeonato Paulista. But in 2007, the team was relegated to the second division (Série A-2), after losing two out of the last three games, the club was defeated by São Bento and Rio Claro but beat São Caetano.

== Honours ==
- Campeonato Paulista Série A2
  - Winners (2): 1922 , 1923
- Campeonato Paulista Série A3
  - Winners (1): 2012
- Campeonato Paulista Série A4
  - Winners (1): 2024

== Stadium ==
They currently play in their home stadium, the Estádio Décio Vitta, which has a maximum capacity of 16,000 people.

== Colors ==
The club's official colors are black and white. Rio Branco's home kit is composed of a white shirt, black shorts and black socks.

== Anthem ==
The club's anthem was composed by Oséas Sass (both the song and the lyrics).

== Mascot ==
Rio Branco's mascot is a tiger, who wears the club's home kit.
