= Americana, São Paulo =

Municipality in São Paulo, Southeast Brazil

Americana
- Municipality
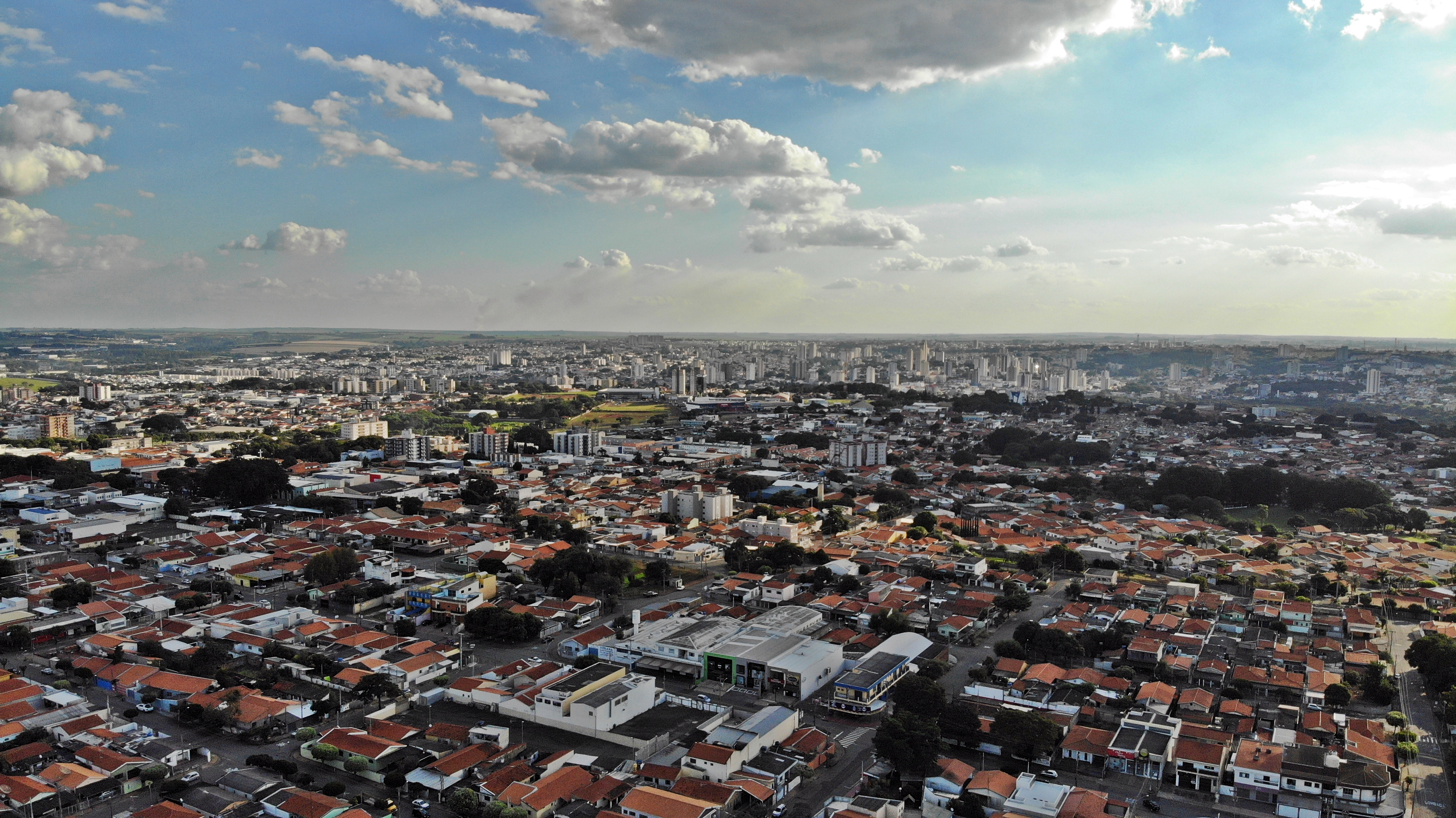
- View of Americana.

- Flag Coat of arms
- Motto: Ex labore dulcedo (Latin); The joy from work
- Location in São Paulo state.

- Location within Brazil
- Coordinates: 22°44′19″S 47°19′52″W
- Country: Brazil
- Region: Southeast
- State: São Paulo
- Metropolitan Region: Campinas
- Founded: August 27, 1875

Government
  - Mayor: Francisco Antônio Sardelli (PV)

Area
  - Total: 133.91 km^{2} (51.70 sq mi)
- Elevation: 569 m (1,867 ft)

Population (2022 Brazilian census)
  - Total: 237,240
  - Estimate (2025): 247,571
  - Density: 1,771.6/km^{2} (4,588.5/sq mi)
- Demonym: Americanese
- Time zone: UTC−3 (BRT)
- Postal code: 13465-000
- Area code: (+55) 19
- HDI (2000): 0.840 – high
- Website: Americana website

Americana (Portuguese pronunciation: [ameɾiˈkɐnɐ]) is a municipality (município) located in the Brazilian state of São Paulo. It is part of the Metropolitan Region of Campinas. The population is 237,240 (2022 Census) in an area of 133.91 km^{2} (51.70 sq mi). The original settlement developed around the local railway station, founded in 1875, and the development of a cotton weaving factory in a nearby farm.

After 1866, thousands of former Confederate soldiers and sympathizers from the American Civil War settled in the region. Following the Civil War, slavery was abolished in the United States. In Brazil, however, slavery was legal until 1888, making it a particularly attractive location to the defeated Confederates, among whom was a former member of the Alabama State Senate, William Hutchinson Norris.

Around three hundred of the Confederados are members of the Fraternidade Descendência Americana (Fraternity of American Descendants). They meet quarterly at the Campo Cemetery.

The city was known as Vila dos Americanos ("Village of the Americans") until 1904, when it belonged to the city of Santa Bárbara d'Oeste. It became a district in 1924 and a municipality in 1953.

Americana has several museums and tourist attractions, including the Pedagogic Historical Museum and the Contemporary Art Museum.

== History ==
The first records on the occupation of the lands where Americana now stands date from the late 18th century, when Domingos da Costa Machado I acquired a crown property between the municipalities of Vila Nova da Constituição (now Piracicaba) and Vila de São Carlos (now Campinas). In that area several estates were created, including Salto Grande, Machadinho, and Palmeiras.

A part of the property, which included the Machadinho estate, was sold by Domingos da Costa Machado II to Antônio Bueno Rangel. After Rangel's death, the estate was divided between his sons José and Basílio Bueno Rangel. A part of the property was afterwards sold to the captain of the Brazilian National Guard, Ignácio Corrêa Pacheco, who is considered the founder of Americana.

=== Confederate immigration ===
In 1866, the region started to be populated with American immigrants from the former Confederate States of America, who were fleeing the aftermath of the American Civil War. The Emperor Dom Pedro II was a fierce advocate of the South during the war, and openly recruited the former Confederates, offering free transport, cheap land, and an easy path to citizenship.

The first immigrant to arrive was the lawyer and ex-state senator from Alabama, colonel William Hutchinson Norris. Norris installed himself in lands near the seat of the Machadinho estate and the Quilombo River.

Norris was to investigate and report on Brazil as a possible new home for Confederates who no longer wanted to live in the United States. His report was positive, and in 1867 the rest of his family arrived in Brazil, accompanied by other families from the Confederate States. These families settled in the region, bringing agricultural innovations and a kind of watermelon known as "Georgia's rattlesnake". Between 8,000 and 20,000 former Confederates emigrated to Brazil (not all to this one town). Slaves were inexpensive in Brazil, one noted, and at least 54 families bought 536 slaves after arrival in Brazil.

Steagall confederate family in Americana

In 1875, almost a decade after the arrival of the Confederate immigrants in the region, the Companhia Paulista de Estradas de Ferro completed the expansion of its main railway to the city of Rio Claro. A station was built within the lands of the Machadinho estate. Despite belonging to the municipality of Campinas, the station was made to serve the estates in the municipality of Santa Bárbara d'Oeste, which was further away and had no station of its own.

The inauguration of the station counted the Emperor Dom Pedro II and Gaston, comte d'Eu among those who attended. The station was baptized "Santa Bárbara station". It is unknown exactly when the small village became the city of Americana, but it is known that this village was created by the time of the inauguration of the railway station, and that it was Ignácio Corrêa Pacheco who distributed the lands. Pacheco is thus considered the founder of the city. The municipal holiday of Americana is still August 27, the day when the railway station was inaugurated.

The old flag of Americana reflecting the city's Confederate origins

The small town formed around the station was named "Villa da Estação de Santa Bárbara" (Santa Bárbara Station Town). Its inhabitants consisted mainly of American families, and the town became thus popularly known as "Villa dos Americanos" (Town of the Americans).

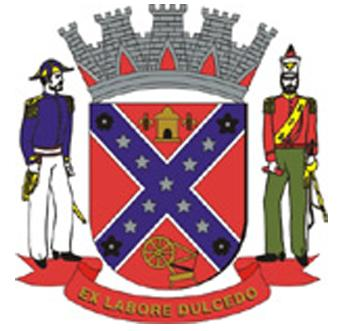
Confederate flag in the old coat of arms of Americana

The similarity between the official name of the town and that of the neighboring municipality frequently caused serious communication problems, such as mail to Santa Bárbara Station often being shipped to the municipality of Santa Bárbara, ten kilometers (6.2 mi) away. In order to solve the problem, the railway company changed the name of the station in 1900 to "Estação de Villa Americana" (American Town Station). The name of the town itself was then also officially changed to "Villa Americana" (American Town).

The official song of the city says, in part:

The many Confederates
brought us
the wheelbarrow, watermelon,
cotton and the plow.

The city celebrates an annual Confederate festival, named the "Festa Confederada". The Confederate flag is prominently displayed, and men dress as Confederate soldiers.

=== Carioba ===
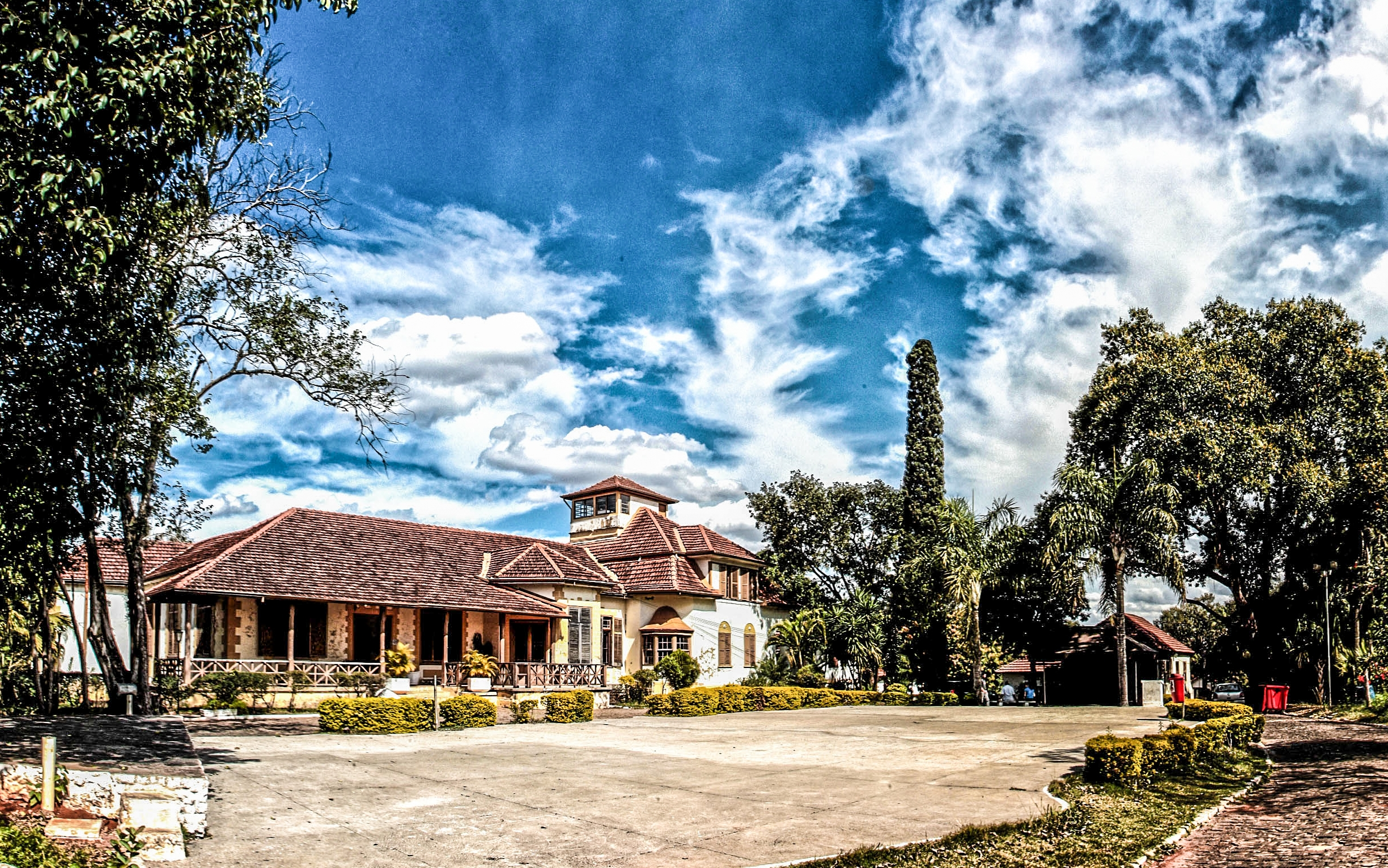
The German Casa de Cultura Hermann Muller Carioba

In the 1890s, the farm known as Fazenda Salto Grande was purchased by the American Clement Willmot. Willmot established the first industry in Americana under the name Clement H. Willmot & Cia. In 1889, the factory was renamed Fábrica de Tecidos Carioba (Carioba Textile Factory). The name "Carioba" derives from the Tupi words for "white cloth".

The factory ran into financial trouble after the abolition of slavery in 1888, and was purchased by German immigrants who were members of the Müller family. The town of Carioba sprang up around the factory. German immigrants brought European-style urbanization to Carioba, which is reflected in the style of its manors, factories, hotels, and schools. Asphalt of tar was then first imported from Europe into Americana and utilized in road paving. The factory became the basis for the present-day Parque Industrial de Americana (Industrial Park of Americana).

=== Italian immigration ===
On October 8, 1887, Joaquim Boer led a large group of Italian immigrants to Brazil. At Americana, these Italian immigrants built their first church in 1896, dedicated to Saint Anthony of Padua, who eventually became the patron saint of the city. Born in Portugal, and called Saint Anthony of Lisbon there, the saint who is among the three June popular saints in the Catholic calendar (the others being Saints John the Baptist and Peter) is celebrated on June 13 with typical Junine countryside Brazilian food, prayers of the rosary, square dance, liquor, and bonfire.

Although immigrants got incentives to come to Brazil, Italians who arrived before that did not seem to have enjoyed special privileges. They often lived within the quarters designed for enslaved Africans who also suffered from lack of comfort and healthy conditions. Those immigrants worked as indentured servants, paying off their debts to farmers who had paid for their tickets and were exploited, until the system was revamped and improved. Their descendants went on to become laborers, merchants, and professionals.

=== Elihu Root's visit ===
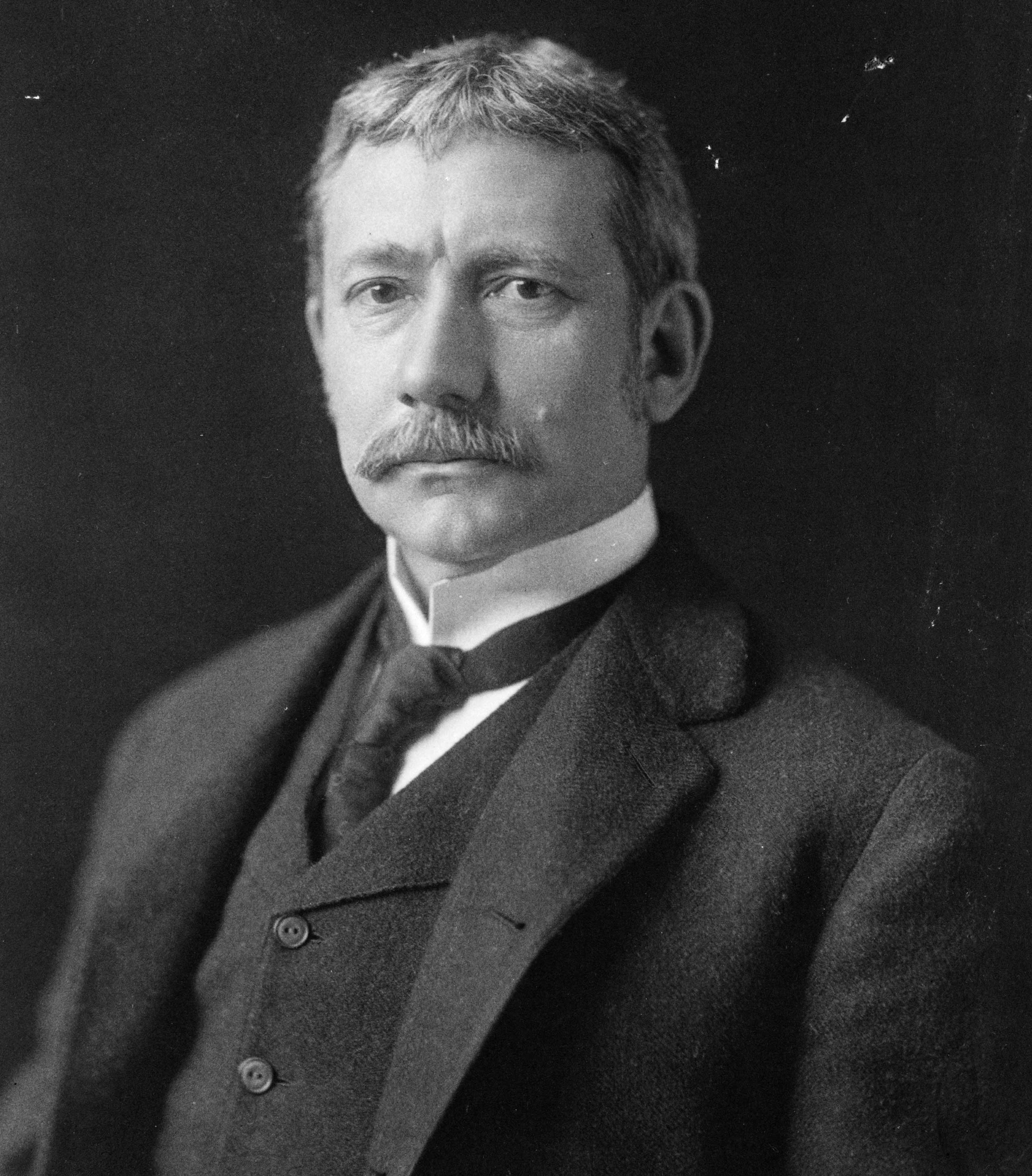
U.S. Secretary of State Elihu Root in Americana

In 1906, two years after the creation of the Distrito de Paz de Villa Americana, the municipality received a visit from Elihu Root, United States Secretary of State, who had been attending and presiding over the Pan-American Conference held in Rio de Janeiro. After the conference, Root visited other parts of Brazil (such as Araras), where he was informed of the existence of Americana. Root expressed interest in visiting the town, and he was received at Americana with great emotion and affection. Hundreds of the residents received Root at nighttime.

=== Autonomy ===
With the change in status from village to district, Americana developed rapidly. Its first police force was created, a sub prefecture was established, and three street lights – lit by kerosene and brought from Germany – were introduced. A school was also established, with the sending of the educator Silvino José de Oliveira to represent Americana's interests with the state government. All of these developments led the local inhabitants to clamor for the status of a city.

In 1922, Villa Americana was one of the most progressive districts in Campinas, with a population of 4,500. In that year, the fight to change its status to city began, led by Antonio Lobo and others, such as Lieutenant Antas de Abreu, Cícero Jones and Hermann Müller himself. Their efforts finally bore fruit: On November 12, 1924, the Municipality of Villa Americana was created, comprising two districts: Villa Americana and Nova Odessa. Nova Odessa later becoming its own municipality.

=== Constitutionalist Revolution and economic development ===
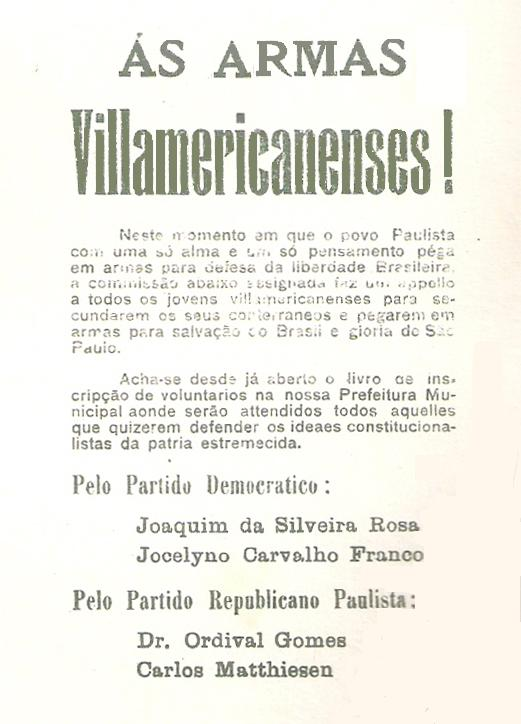
A call to arms to the young men of Americana during the Constitutionalist Revolution

At the time of the beginning of the Getúlio Vargas dictatorship in Brazil in 1930, Americana was undergoing a profound economic transformation due to the rise of the textile industry there (the city was known as the "Rayon Capital").

In 1932, during the administration of Mayor Antonio Zanaga, the revolt known as the Constitutionalist Revolution erupted against Vargas's regime. Americana sent volunteers to this revolution, and three of them, Jorge Jones, Fernando de Camargo and Aristeu Valente (from Nova Odessa, then part of Americana), perished during the struggle. Their sacrifice is remembered in Americana to this day.

In 1938, Mayor Zanaga changed the name of the town from Villa Americana to Americana, and due to the economic transformation of the town, the Comarca of Americana was created on December 31, 1953, during the administration of Mayor Jorge Arbix. In 1959, during the administration of Mayor Abrahim Abraham, Nova Odessa was made autonomous as its own municipality.

Between 1960 and 1970, the rapid development of Americana led many people to move there in search of work. Because of its size, there was not enough room to accommodate the new residents and many lived on the border of Santa Bárbara d'Oeste and Americana, creating what is known today as Zona Leste de Santa Bárbara (East Santa Barbara).

The same also occurred because the majority of the population were unaware of the location where one municipality ended and where another began. The confusion came about because municipal limits were not yet fully determined. The problem was solved with the creation of a major avenue, today called Avenida da Amizade (Friendship Avenue), which became the dividing line.

At the same time as these developments, some problems were also created. The sudden increase in population caused an imbalance in the public accounts of the municipality, which was not ready for such a great number of new residents.

== Geography ==
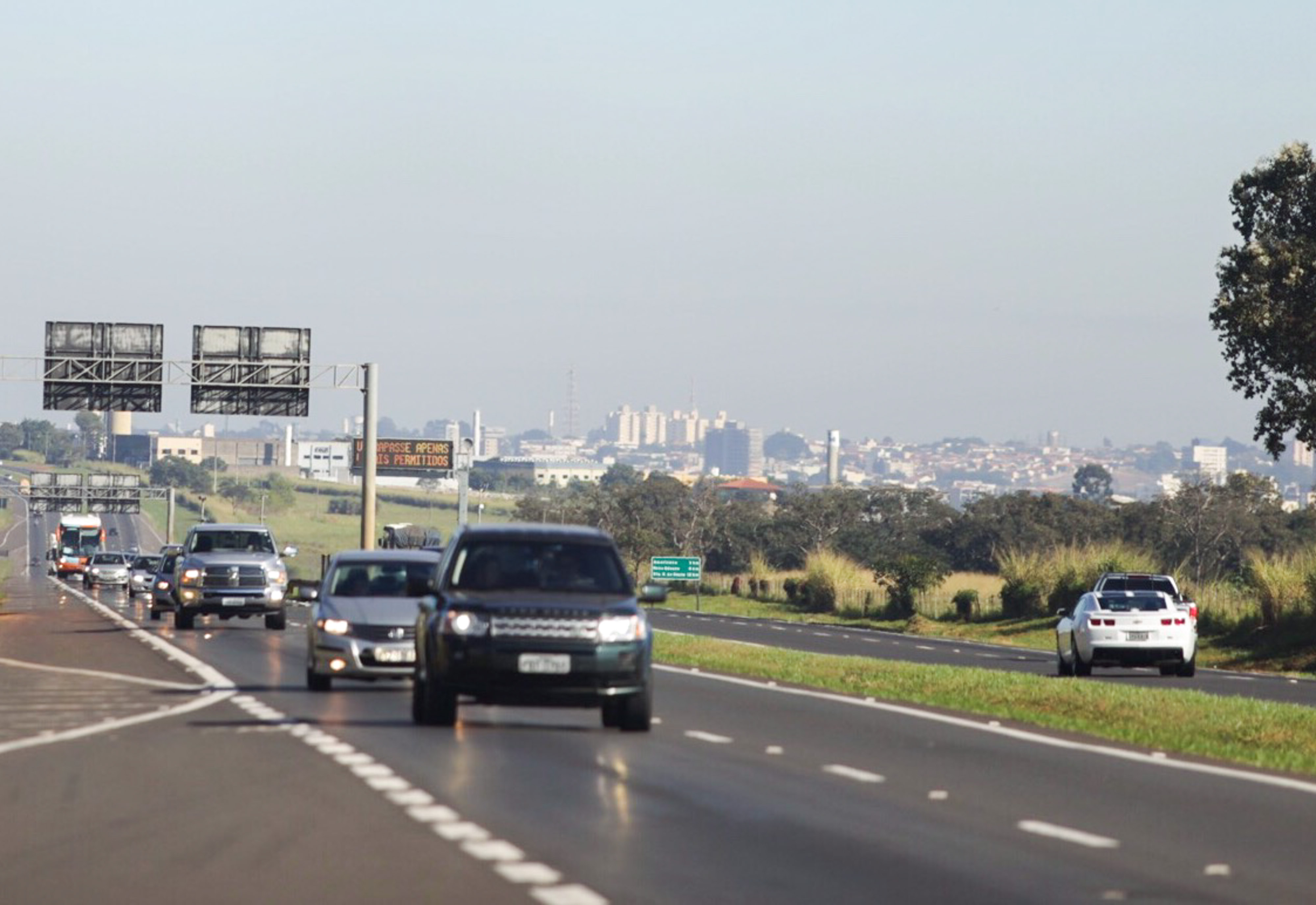
SP-304 Highway in Americana

=== Location ===
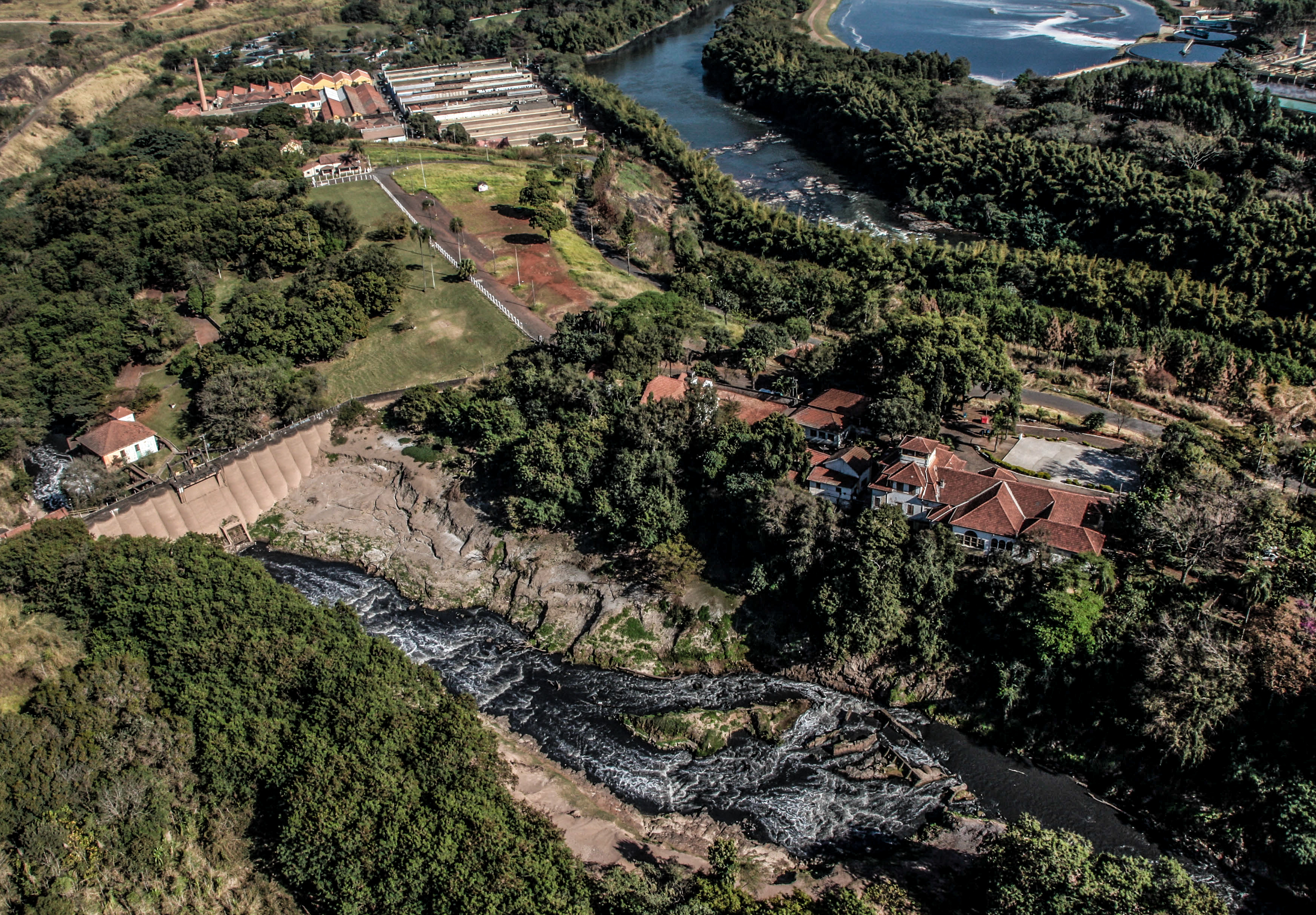
Aerial view of rural Americana

Americana is located in the center-east region of the state of São Paulo, Southeast Region.

- 124 km (77 mi) from São Paulo
- 205 km (127 mi) from the Port of Santos
- 35 km (22 mi) from Campinas
- 110 km (68 mi) from São Carlos
- 150 km (93 mi) from São Bernardo do Campo
- 30 km (19 mi) from Piracicaba
- 15 km (9.3 mi) from REPLAN em Paulínia

=== Climate ===
Americana has an altitude tropical climate, with hot summers and chilly winters. In winter, there is much less rainfall than in summer. According to Köppen and Geiger the climate classification is Aw.

The median high temperature in summer is 29 °C (84 °F) and the median low is 18 °C (64 °F), comparable to Boston. In winter, the median high temperature is 22 °C (72 °F) and the median low temperature is 10 °C (50 °F), comparable to Orlando, Florida.

In Americana, the month with the most daily hours of sunshine is February with an average of 9.37 hours of sunshine. In total, there are 290.43 hours of sunshine in February.

The month with the fewest daily hours of sunshine in Americana is January with an average of 8.87 hours of sunshine per day. In total, there are 266.09 hours of sunshine in January. About 3251.14 hours of sunshine are counted in Americana throughout the year. On average, there are 106.92 hours of sunshine per month.

=== Ecology ===
Amblyomma sculptum and A. dubitatum are common here. In 2017, it was found that α-cypermethrin (pyrethroid) and flufenoxuron (benzoylurea chitin synthesis inhibitor) are efficacious against populations in this area. These ticks are significant veterinary parasites and so α-cyp and flufenoxuron are useful here for animal protection.

== Demography ==
=== Population ===
Historical population (municipality)
Year	Population	%±
1940	13,502	—
1950	21,415	58.6%
1960	42,458	98.3%
1970	66,771	57.3%
1980	122,055	82.8%
1991	153,778	26.0%
2000	182,300	18.5%
2010	210,701	15.6%
2022	237,240	12.6%

According to the 2022 IBGE Census, as of August 2022, Americana had a population of 237,240 and a population density of 1,771.61 (inhabitants / km^{2}).

=== Ethnic groups ===
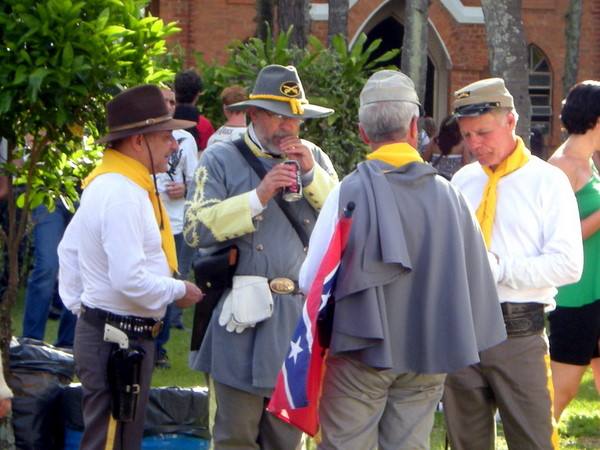
Confederate descendants at a Confederate party

The population mainly descends from American Southerners and a mixture of Portuguese, Italian, German and Levantine immigrants, as well as some indigenous Brazilian and African peoples.

Because of its origins as a village settled by American Confederates, it received the name "Americana", the feminine form of "American", which in Portuguese can mean any native of the Americas, although often applied only to U.S. citizens.

Main ethnic groups:

- 84.6% White
- 12.0% Pardo (mixed-race)
- 2.4% Black
- 0.8% Asian
- 0.2% Native American

== Neighborhoods ==
The municipality is currently divided into 10 planning areas, through the Integrated Development Master Plan, and the city is made up of 300 neighborhoods.

== Culture ==
=== Theaters ===
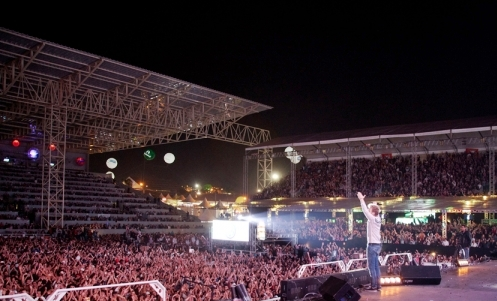
Show in Americana.

- The Teatro Arena Elis Regina, or the Elis Regina Arena Theater (named after Elis Regina) was built in 1981 and became a venue for various artists. It was then abandoned to a state of dilapidation, having become a site of illegal activities. In 2000, reconstruction began, reopening on September 22, 2004. The theater was rebuilt with the idea of a circus in mind: it would offer various entertaining spectacles and activities simultaneously, and the theater was covered with a white canvas sheet, evoking the impression of lightness and brightness. The theater offers 1100 seats, two dressing rooms, and ample parking space.
- Teatro Municipal Lulu Benencasse, or Lulu Benencasse Municipal Theater, opened in 1986, occupying the building of the old Cine Brasil, which for decades had been a hang-out for young americanenses. Since its inauguration, it has served as the venue for various cultural offerings, such as plays, dance performances, and music, as well as different social and artistic programs. The theater was chosen as a film location by the producers of the film Por Trás do Pano (1999, with Denise Fraga) due to its traditional appearance. It has 840 seats.

=== Municipal Library ===
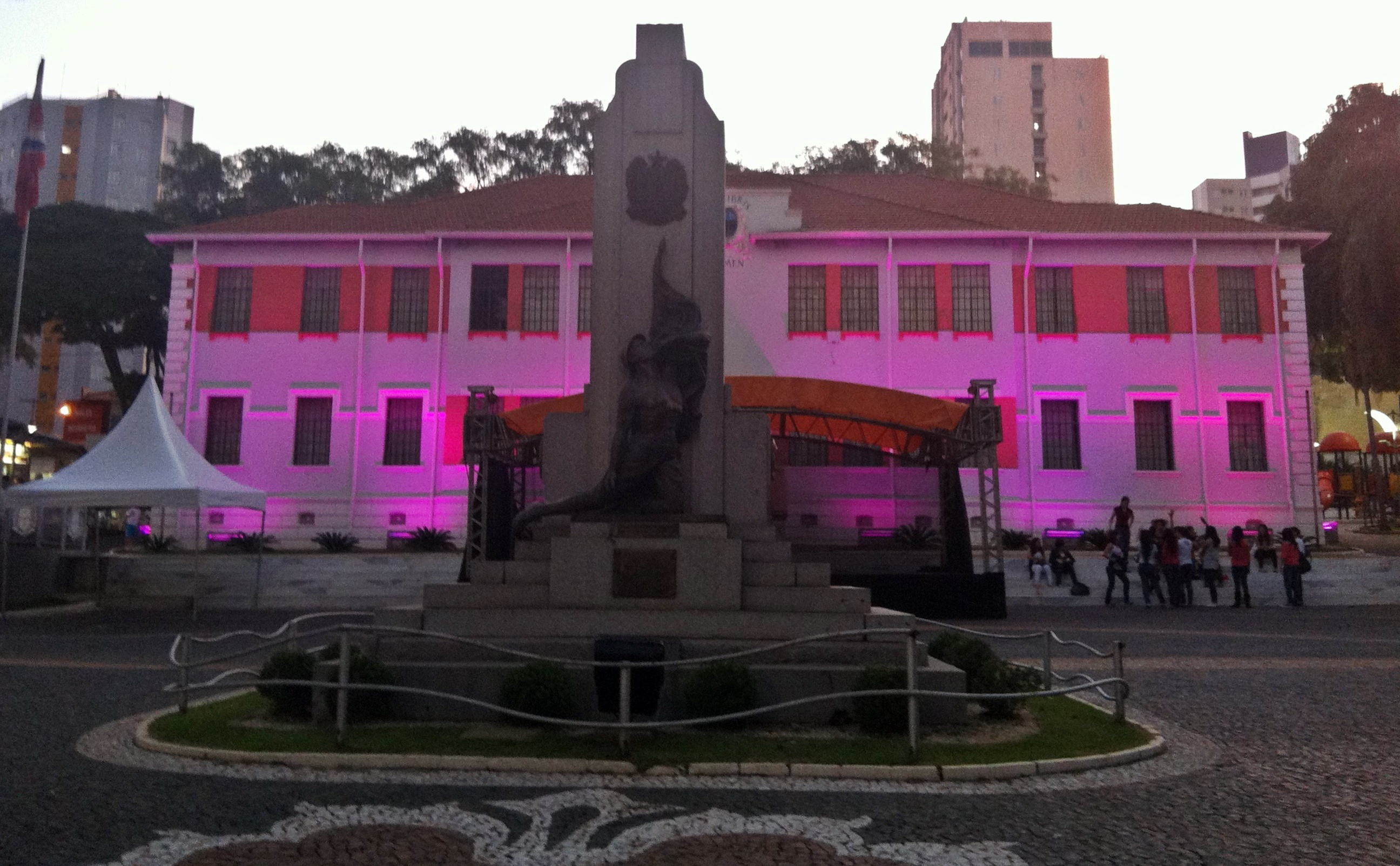
Library of Americana

The Municipal Library, named after the teacher Jandira Basseto Pântano, was founded on October 25, 1955. It occupies the old building belonging to the Academic Group "Dr. Heitor Penteado" on Comendador Müller Square, near the Church of Santo Antônio. It contains 41429 books on various general subjects and 9051 children's books, totalling 50,480 books (as of June 1999), as well as 114 various newspapers and 24,500 magazines, including children's. The average number of visitors in 1998 was 600 people, who mostly came in the afternoon. Its enrolled number of associates totals 31,900 people, as of December 1998.

Jandira Basseto Pântano was born on October 27, 1918, in Americana. She received her elementary education at the Escolas Reunidas, one of the first schools founded in the city. She completed her education at Campinas and in January 1938 was named a substitute teacher at the Academic Group "Dr. Heitor Penteado" before becoming a full-time teacher there. She worked as a teacher at the school for 22 years, and was noted for her hard work and diligence. She worked with all of the grades, but she preferred to work with the fourth year students, and prepare them for the wider world. She retired on March 9, 1968, and died on June 7, 1988. Up until her death, she continued to receive students at her home, helping illiterate adults and poor children.

=== Museums and cultural centers ===
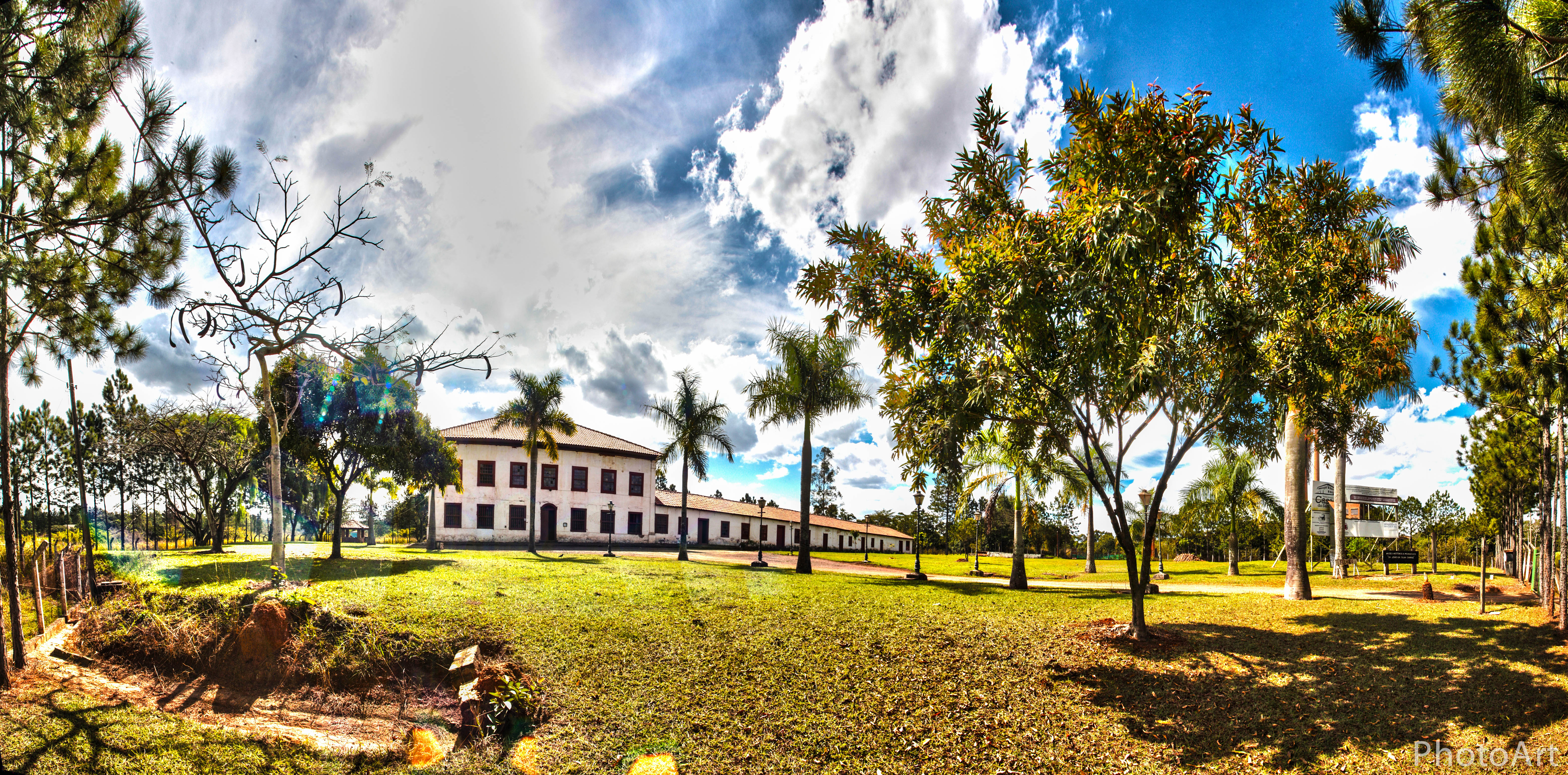
Salto Grande Museum in Americana

- Museum of Contemporary Art (Museu de Arte Contemporânea (MAC)): Founded in 1978, it is found in a building attached to the Municipal Library. It contains 260 works of art by contemporary artists, including paintings, sculpture, engravings, designs, photographs, and artistic installations. The museum features exhibitions by local artists and by artists from other cities, as well as workshops and classes. It also contains a library and holds an annual national contest, which gives the "Prêmio Revelação de Artes Plásticas" (Revelation Prize of Plastic Arts) to young artists.
- "Conselheiro João Carrão" Historic and Pedagogical Museum (Museu Histórico e Pedagógico "Conselheiro João Carrão): This museum is located in the old farm known as Salto Grande built in colonial Minas Gerais style from taipa according to the "pilão" technique, where the material is piled and compressed into horizontal layers a course at a time, with foundations made from real wood. Located at the confluence of the Atibaia and Jaguari Rivers, the museum contains photographs, maps, historical artifacts and machines, furniture, and torture devices used during the slavery system.

=== Religion ===
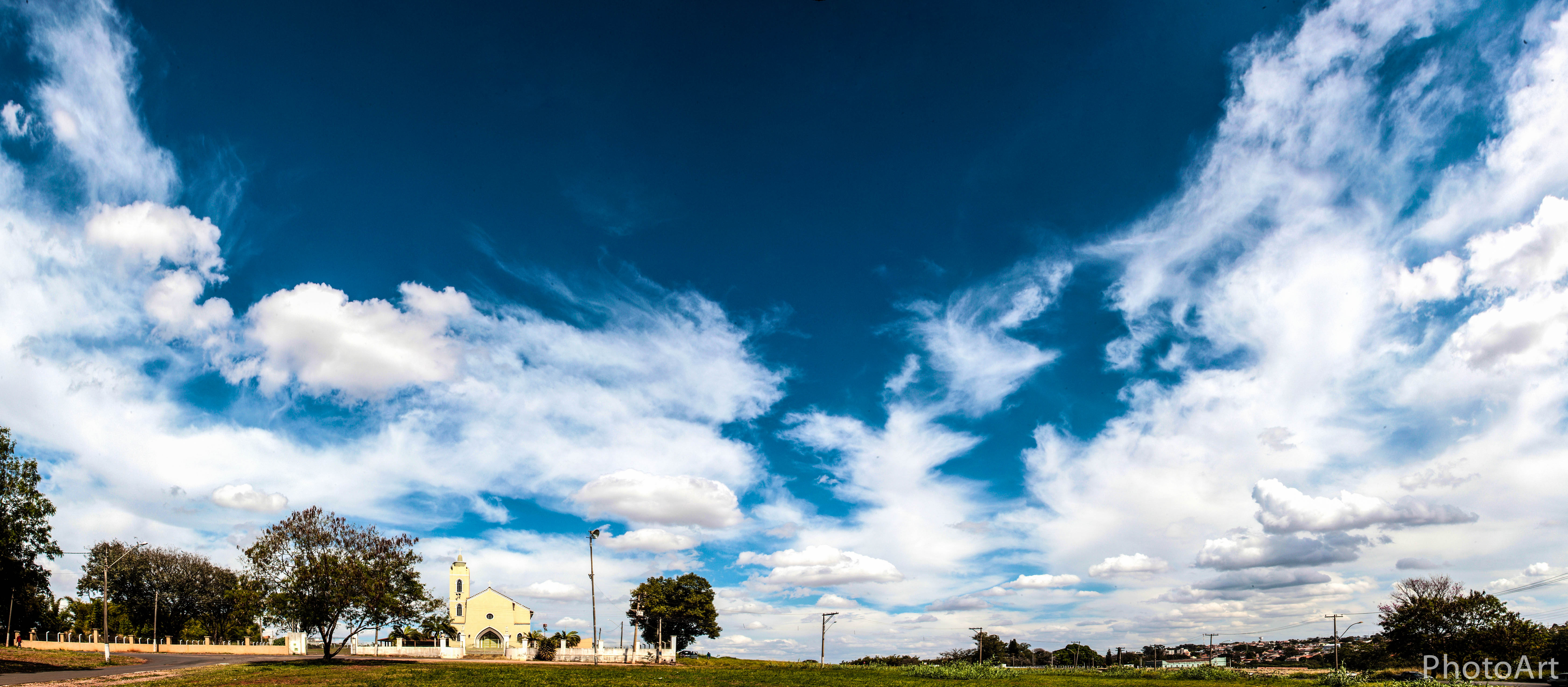
Church in Americana

- Roman Catholicism: Since the dismemberment of the Roman Catholic Archdiocese of Campinas in 1976, Americana fell under the diocese of Roman Catholic Diocese of Limeira. Americana has a strong Catholic tradition due to the influence of Luso-Brazilians and of its Italian immigrants, who first began arriving in 1887. The first church at Americana was built in the middle of 1896 and dedicated to Saint Anthony of Padua, who became the patron saint of the city. The city has one of the largest Catholic churches in the country built in the Neoclassical style, the New Church of Saint Anthony (Matriz Nova de Santo Antônio), the largest in the diocese.
- Protestantism and evangelicalism: Americana is also home to adherents of Protestant denominations such as the Nazarene, Presbyterian, Methodist, Baptist, Assembly of God, Adventist, Pentecostal denominations such as Universal Church and Restorationist denominations such as the Jehovah's Witnesses and the Church of Jesus Christ of Latter-day Saints. Immigrants from the Southern United States brought with them various customs and religions, mostly of the Presbyterian and Baptist persuasions.

=== Sports ===
Rio Branco Esporte Clube, founded in 1913, is the football (soccer) club of the city. The team plays their home matches at Estádio Décio Vitta, which has a maximum capacity of 15,000 people.

== Infrastructure ==
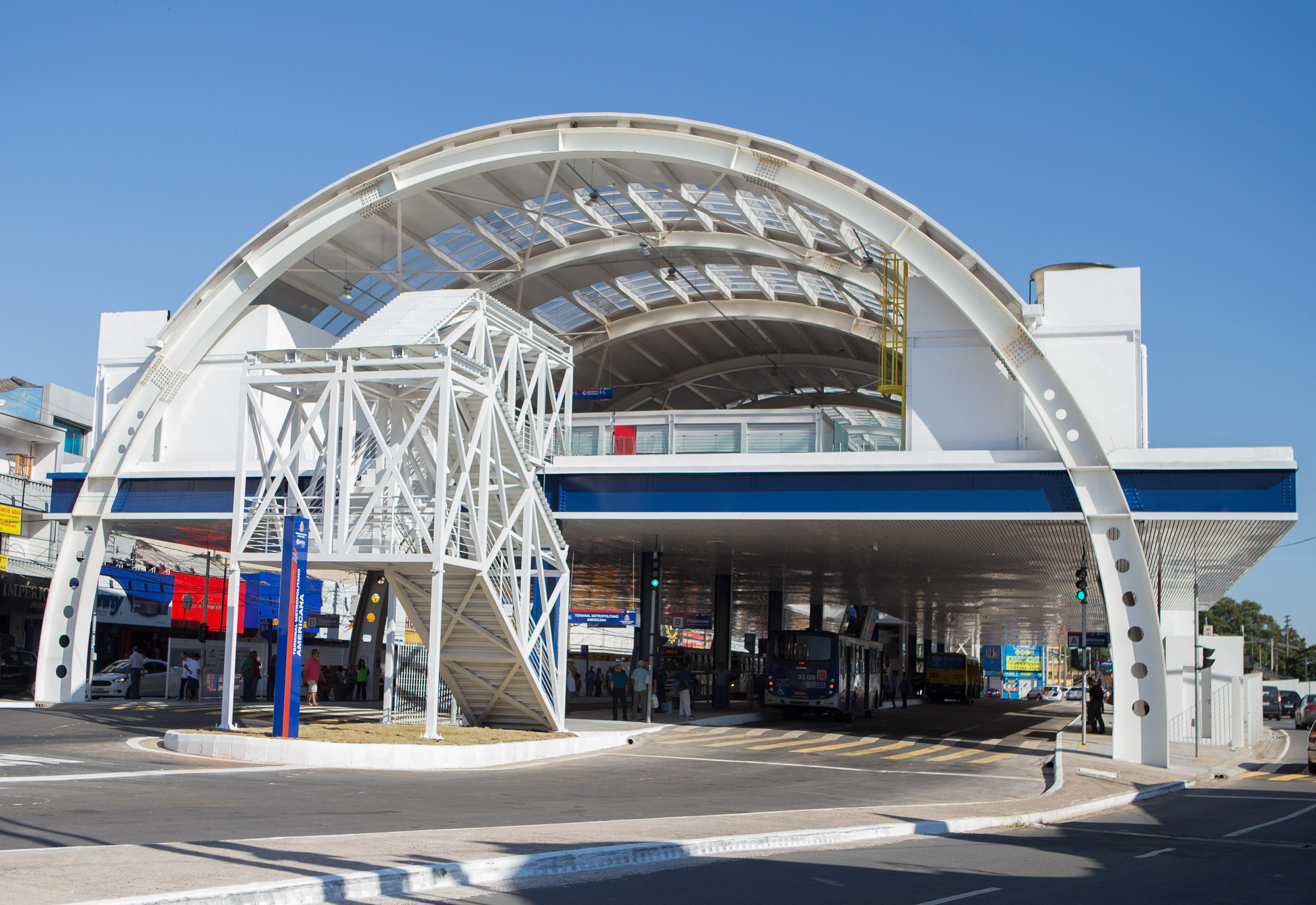
Bus station in Americana

=== Bus station ===
Named Terminal Rodoviario Francisco Luiz Bendilatti, the Americana bus station has been in operation since 1988 and is located in the Campo Limpo neighborhood. The location receives buses from more than thirty locations, which operate in the Southeast, South and Center-west regions of Brazil. The main cities connected with Americana bus station are São Paulo, Goiânia, Curitiba, Araraquara, Osasco, Limeira, Santo André, Cascavel, Londrina and Maringá. The Terminal has twenty-five cargo transport companies.

=== Airport ===
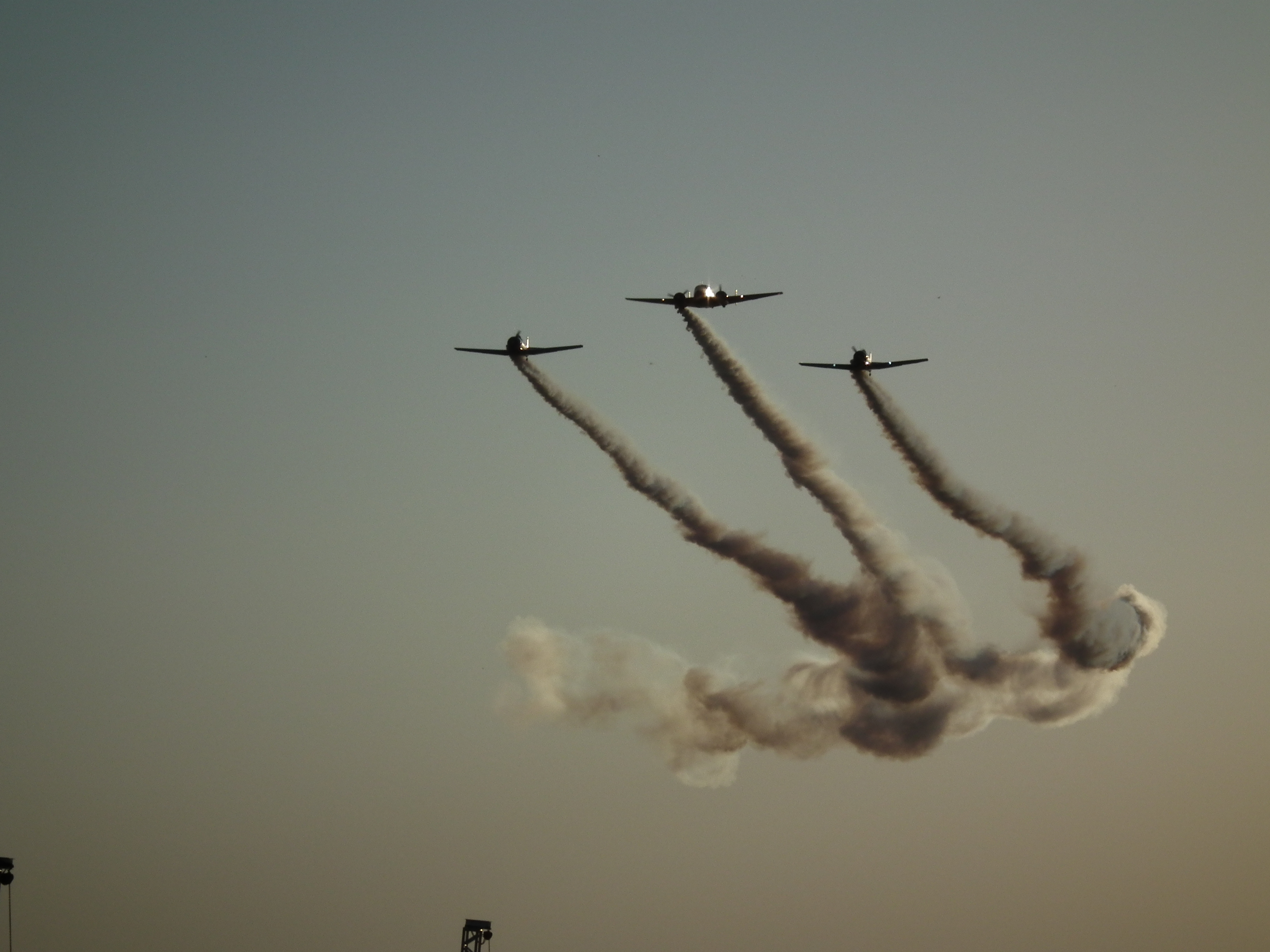
Aerial spectacle in Americana

The main and closest airport in the area is in the neighboring city of Campinas, Campinas International Airport, and the main airport in Brazil and South America, in the city of São Paulo, São Paulo-Guarulhos International Airport, is in the same state.

=== Sports ===
In football, the city is represented by Rio Branco Esporte Clube, founded on August 4, 1913. Rio Branco played in series A1 of the Campeonato Paulista since 1992 and was relegated to A2 in 2009.

It used to play in series C of the Campeonato Brasileiro. The team plays in Décio Vitta, with a capacity of 15,000.

Americana is also the hometown of Paralympics swimmer Danilo Binda Glasser, winner of two bronze medals in the Paralympics of Sydney 2000 and at Athens 2004, and footballer Oscar, a silver medallist at the 2012 London Olympics, a 2013 FIFA Confederations Cup champion, a 2011–2012 UEFA Champions League champion Chelsea F.C. player.

In 2014, the city hosted the first Pan-American Korfball Championship.

== Media ==
In telecommunications, the city was served by Telecomunicações de São Paulo. In July 1998, this company was acquired by Telefónica, which adopted the Vivo brand in 2012.

The company is currently an operator of cell phones, fixed lines, internet (fiber optics/4G) and television (satellite and cable).

== Notable people ==
- Fritz Köberle (1910–1983), physician, pathologist and scientist
- Oscar, footballer

== See also ==
- Confederados
- American Brazilians
- List of municipalities in the state of São Paulo by population
- Interior of São Paulo
