= Estádio Décio Vitta =

Multi-use stadium in São Paulo, Brazil

Coordinates: 22°44′03.94″S 47°20′52.83″W

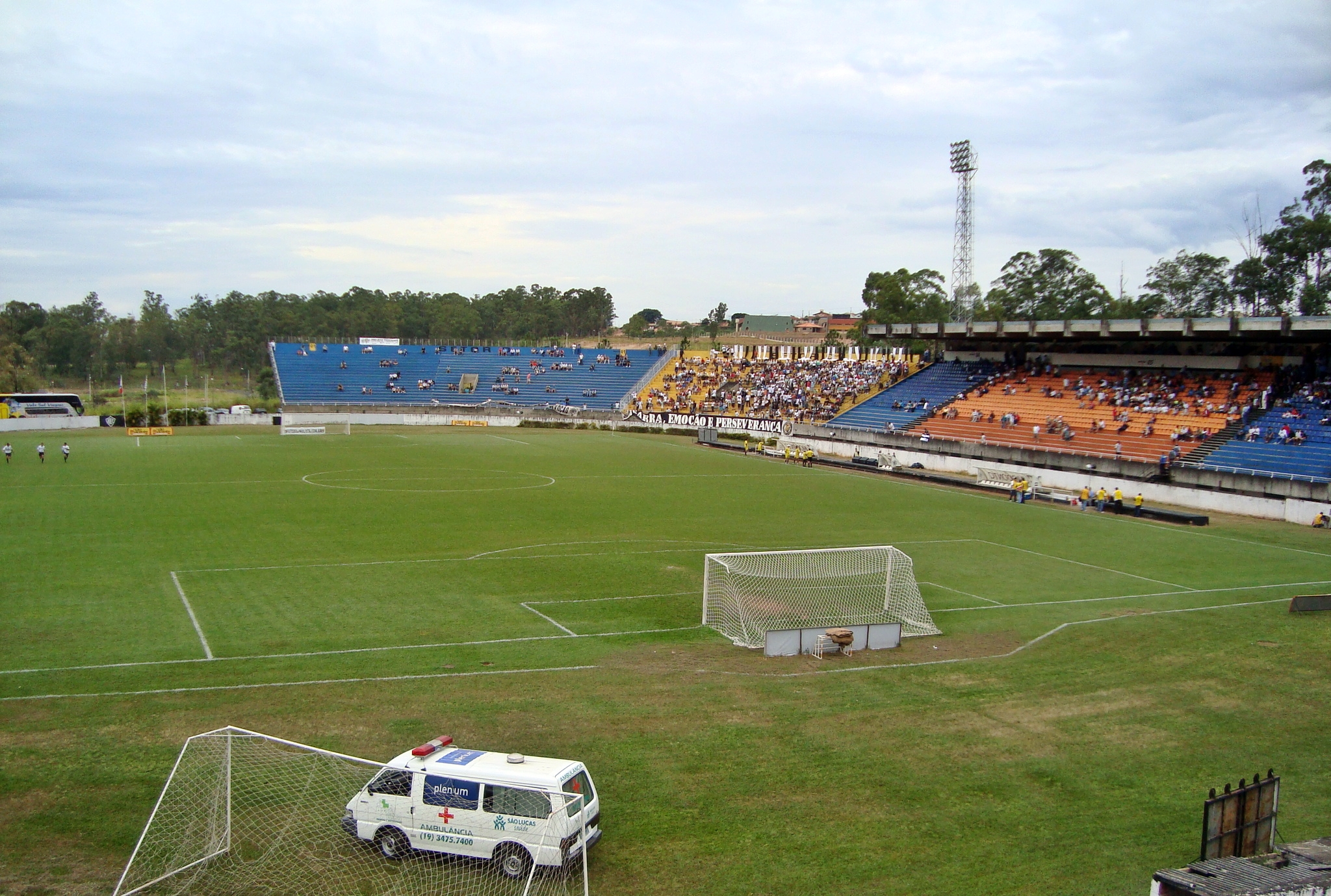
- Sisbrace
- Interactive map of Estádio Décio Vitta
- Full name: Estádio Décio Vitta
- Former names: Riobrancão (1977–1986)
- Address: Avenida Carminé Feola, 1073
- Location: Americana, Brazil
- Owner: Rio Branco
- Operator: Rio Branco
- Capacity: 16.146 (total); 8,712 (limited capacity)
- Surface: Natural grass
- Record attendance: 19,173 (Rio Branco – São Paulo, 9 March 1993)
- Field size: 105 by 68 metres (114.8 yd × 74.4 yd)

Construction
- Opened: May 1, 1977

Tenants
- Rio Branco (1979-present); Americana Futebol (2011); Americana EC (1977-1979)

Estádio Décio Vitta, nicknamed Riobrancão, is a multi-use stadium located in Americana, São Paulo, Brazil. It is used mostly for football matches and hosts the home matches of Rio Branco Esporte Clube and Americana Futebol. The stadium has a maximum capacity of 16,000 people and was built in 1977. It is owned by Rio Branco Esporte Clube, and is named after Décio Vitta, who was a Rio Branco counselor and director, and co-ordinated the stadium construction.

== History ==
In 1954, Rio Branco ceded its football field to the São Paulo state government, which built a state school there, and in exchange, the government ceded a new groundplot to the club.

In 1971, the stadium construction started, after Rio Branco and the Americana city hall came to an agreement.

The construction finished in 1977, and the stadium was inaugurated on May 1 of that year, with the name Riobrancão. The inaugural match was played on that day, when Americana beat Taubaté 2–1. The first goal of the stadium was scored by Americana's Niltinho.

In 1981, Rio Branco's president at the time, Délcio Dollo, proposed the stadium to be renamed Décio Vitta, however, this happened only in 1986.

The stadium's attendance record currently stands at 19,173, set on March 9, 1993, when Rio Branco beat São Paulo 1–0.
