= Santa Bárbara d'Oeste =

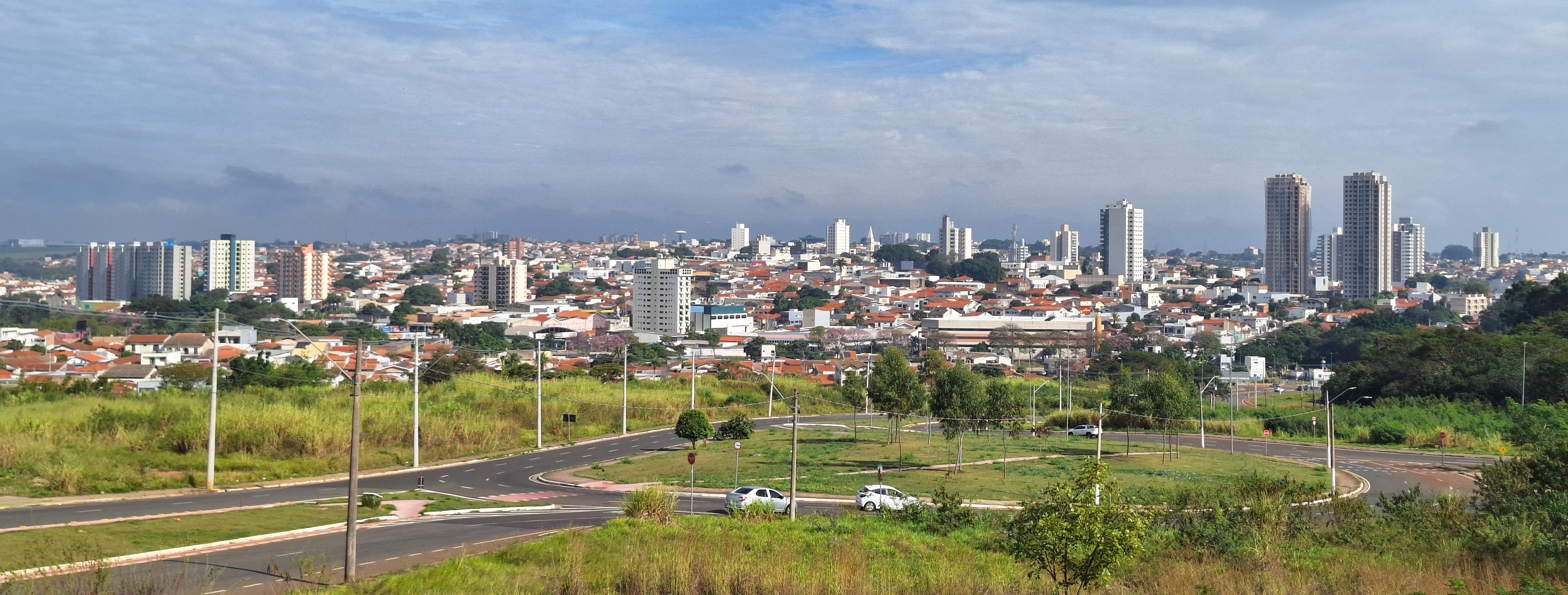
- Skyline of Santa Bárbara d'Oeste

- Flag Coat of arms
- Nickname: Pérola Açucareira (Sugar Pearl)
- Motto: Sancta Barbara Bene Juvante (Latin)
- Location in the São Paulo state.

- Location within Brazil
- Coordinates: 22°45′16″S 47°24′51″W
- Country: Brazil
- State: São Paulo
- Mesoregion: Campinas
- Microregion: Campinas

Government
  - Mayor: Rafael Piovezan (PV)

Area
  - Total: 271.030 km^{2} (104.645 sq mi)
- Elevation: 570 m (1,870 ft)

Population (2022 Brazilian census)
  - Total: 183,347
  - Estimate (2025): 189,456
  - Density: 676.482/km^{2} (1,752.08/sq mi)
- Demonym: Barbarense
- Time zone: UTC−3 (BRT)
- HDI (2000): 0.819 – high
- Website: link

Santa Bárbara d'Oeste is a municipality in the State of São Paulo in Brazil. It is part of the Metropolitan Region of Campinas. It lies about 138 kilometres (86 mi) northwest of the State capital. It occupies an area of 272.2 square kilometres (105.1 sq mi), of which 43.1 square kilometres (16.6 sq mi) is urban. In 2020, the population was estimated at 194,390 by the Brazilian Institute of Geography and Statistics, making it the 43rd most populous city in São Paulo and the sixth largest in the metropolitan region of Campinas.

Santa Bárbara d'Oeste has an annual average temperature of 22.2 °C (72.0 °F), and the original vegetation of the area predominates. The city has an urbanization rate of 98.73%. As of 2009, there were 44 medical institutions in the city, and its human development index (HDI) is rated as 0.819 in relation to the rest of the state.

Founded on 4 December 1818, when the Church was built, the city was named in honor of its patron saint, Santa Barbara, it was originally part of Piracicaba. It separated from Piracicaba in 1900. Since Margaret Grace Martins donated the land for the construction of the townsite, she is considered the founder, making the city the first and only Brazilian city founded by a woman. The city is also the birthplace of Brazil's automobile industry, being where the first car was produced in Brazil. Today, Santa Bárbara d'Oeste is subdivided into slightly more than 130 districts.

Santa Bárbara d'Oeste has an important cultural tradition, ranging from craft and theater, to music and sports. American immigration has brought various influences on both cultural and tourist events and attractions, including the Party of Immigration, and the Fair of Nations. In the midst of the city is a cemetery, best known as the Graveyard of the Americans. Originally established for the burial of Confederados, it is administered by the Fraternity of American Descendants, who regularly hold meetings and events aimed at preserving the traditions and customs of American immigrants.

== History ==
=== Origins ===
Until around 1810, the area where the city of Santa Bárbara d'Oeste now stands was virgin forest. That year, a road was constructed, linking the parish of Santo Antônio de Piracicaba to Villa de San Carlos de Campinas. With these improvements, the area turned into a good agricultural region due to its plentiful water sources, leading to the region being broken into allotments and put up for sale.

Margaret Grace Martins, widow of sergeant major Francisco de Paula Martins, bought one of those allotments, measuring two leagues square, whose boundaries were the Piracicaba river to the north and by Quilombo Creek to the northeast. On the site, she founded a sugar plantation, putting her son, Captain Manoel Francisco Grace Martins, in charge of administering the property. In 1818, she initiated the formation of a settlement and the construction of a chapel, dedicated to Saint Barbara. Martins donated the lands the city would develop on, making the town the first and only Brazilian city founded by a woman. The chapel was dedicated on 4 December 1818, now considered to be the date of the town's founding.

As the area was settled, other farmers settled in and around the city. On 16 April 1839, the municipality rose to the position of Capela Curada de Santa Bárbara of Toledos (the name "Toledos" was added in reference to the stream that crossed the city, named Ribeirao of Toledos), and became the Fourth District of Vila Nova da Constituição (now the city of Piracicaba).

Years later, the district of Santa Barbara was created by Provincial Law Number 9, on 18 February 1842, in addition, the chapel was elevated from a capela curada, an official title given by the Catholic Church, to a freguesia. It was then transferred on 23 January 1844, to become part of the municipality of Campinas, followed by a further transfer, by Provincial Law Number 12 on 2 March 1846, back to the Municipality of Piracicaba. Finally, by Provincial Law No. 2, on 15 June 1869 the municipality of Santa Barbara was officially created, parting from Piracicaba. The Municipality has always been made up of a single district. The town was officially renamed Santa Bárbara d'Oeste on 30 November 1944.

=== 20th and 21st centuries ===
The sugar industry boomed in the late 19th century due to the increase in the demand for sugar. At the time, large sugar mills were constructed in the city, such as the Plant de Cillo Santa Bárbara (now disabled). In the 1920s several industries emerged, including textiles and agricultural implements. Over the years, other industries moved into the area. Eventually, on 5 September 1956, the first Brazilian car, the Romi-Isetta, was released.

During the 1960s and 1970s, with the rapid development of the nearby settlement of Americana, many people came looking for jobs and housing. Due to the close proximity of the two municipalities, the area between them was settled, creating a conurbation. Initially there was some confusion, since the boundaries of the two towns were not officially set. The problem was solved with the creation of the Avenida da Amizade, which cut through the region, fixing the boundary between the two towns. The population expansion not only brought development, but also problems to the region, since it drained public accounts. This precipitated years of economic stagnation.

Since the 2000s, due to both public and private investment, the city is reaching an economic and social balance, becoming increasingly competitive in the metropolitan region of Campinas. Legal incentives for businesses that invest in the city were created, and the expansion of the Rodovia dos Bandeirantes, whose route passes through the municipality, has brought new opportunities for development.

Today, Santa Bárbara is one of the major economic forces in the metropolitan region of Campinas, with a good quality of life. The city has a strong industrial character, and is home to companies such as Romi, Usina Furlan, Goodyear, Canatiba, Mazak, and Denso. The city boasts good leisure facilities such as the Tivoli, which opened in November 1998, and is one of the main shopping malls and meeting points in the city with almost 700,000 visitors every month. It serves the population of Santa Bárbara d'Oeste, Americana, Nova Odessa, Sumaré and Hortolândia, as well as the regions of Piracicaba and Limeira.

== American immigration ==
After the end of the American Civil War, beginning in 1867, the region began to see immigration from the southern United States, these immigrants were known as the Confederados. Along with their customs and cultures, the Americans brought new agricultural methods and techniques, contributing greatly to the advancement of agriculture in the region. This contribution is celebrated at the Immigration Museum. The Confederados' emphasis on agriculture pushed out both agricultural and non-agricultural practices which were ongoing at the time of their arrival. The Americans also brought new Christian denominations into Brazil; on 10 September 1871 the first Brazilian Baptist Church was established in Santa Bárbara.

The first Americans to arrive in the city were Colonel William Hutchinson Norris, a Civil War veteran and former Senator from the State of Alabama, and his son, who began to teach courses on cotton cultivation techniques to local farmers. Once they were established, they sent for the rest of their family, as well as other countrymen. American immigration was crucial to one of the main cultural events of the city: the annual meeting of the Fraternity of American Descendants. Many immigrants who came to Santa Bárbara d'Oeste achieved national prominence, such as Pérola Byington, a philanthropist and social activist born in the city.

=== Descendants of the immigrants ===
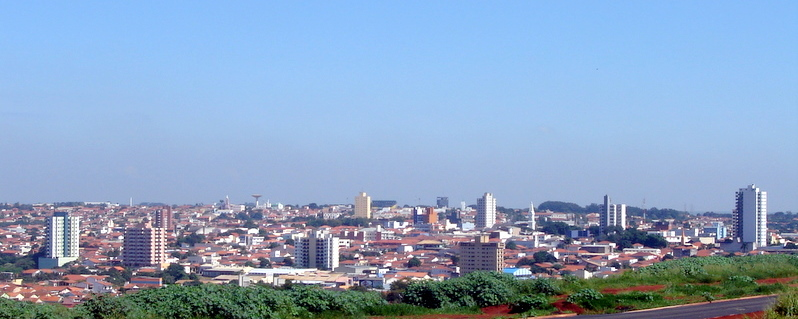
Santa Bárbara d'Oeste received an influx of immigrants from the Confederate States of America in the late 1860s (known as Confederados)

The first generation of Confederados remained an insular community, but by the third generation, most of the families had intermarried with native Brazilians or immigrants of other origins. As time went on, these descendants of the Confederados increasingly spoke the Portuguese language and identified themselves as Brazilians. As the area around Santa Bárbara d'Oeste and Americana turned increasingly to the production of sugar cane and the society became more mobile, the Confederados tended to migrate to cities. Today, only a few families still live on the original land owned by their ancestors. While the descendants of the original Confederados are scattered throughout Brazil, they maintain the headquarters of their descendant organization in Santa Bárbara d'Oeste.

Today's Confederados maintain affection for the Confederate flag even though they consider themselves completely Brazilian. In Brazil, the Confederate flag does not have the historical association with slavery nor the corresponding stigma that exists in the United States. Many modern Confederados are of mixed-race and reflect the varied racial categories that make up Brazilian society in their physical appearance. Recently the Brazilian residents of Americana, now of primarily Italian descent, have removed the Confederate flag from the city's crest citing the fact that Confederados now make up only 10% of the city's population. In 1972, then Governor (and future President) Jimmy Carter of Georgia visited the city of Santa Bárbara d'Oeste and visited the grave of his wife Rosalynn's great-uncle, who was one of the original Confederados.

=== Culture ===
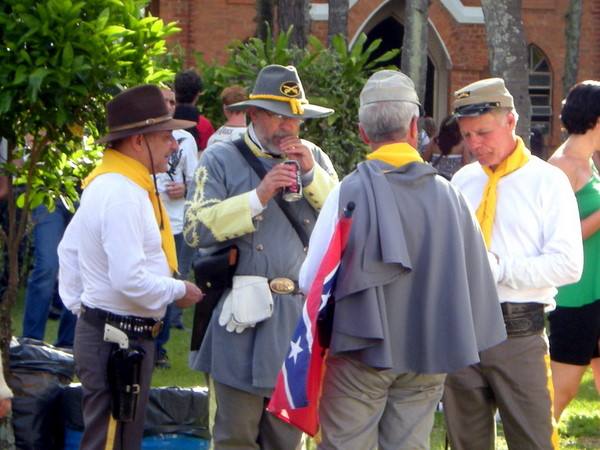
Descendants of Americans during Confederado Festival in Santa Bárbara d'Oeste.

The center of Confederado culture is the Campo Cemetery, known as the Cemetery of the Americans, in Santa Bárbara d'Oeste, where most of the original Confederados from the region are buried. Most of the Confederados were Protestant, and the only cemetery in town was the Catholic cemetery, where it was forbidden to bury non-Catholics. In 1867, with the death of Beatrice Oliver, wife of Colonel Oliver, he buried her (as he later buried his daughters) on a plot of land on his property. He earmarked an acre of his land so that American families could bury their dead. This became the Cemetery of the Americans. Today about 500 people are buried in the cemetery.

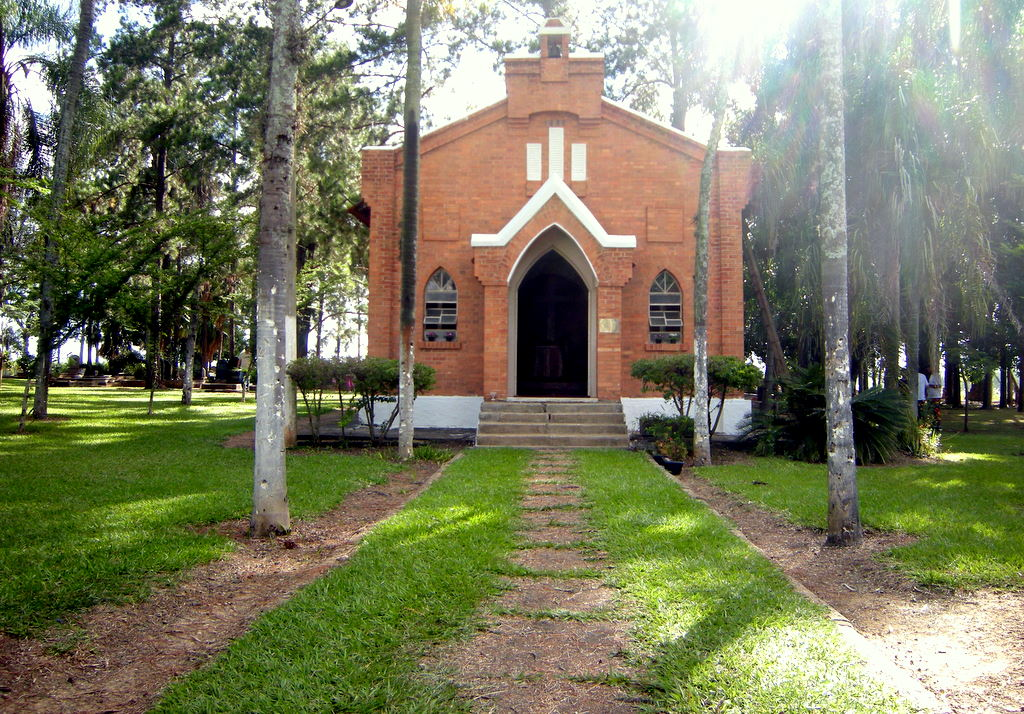
The chapel of Santa Bárbara d'Oeste

The descendants still foster a connection with their history through the Fraternity of American Descendants, an organization dedicated to preserving the unique mixed culture. In April, the organization holds an annual festival, called the Festa Confederada in order to fund the Campo Cemetery. The festival is based on the culture of the old American south of the antebellum period. During the event there are typical American foods such as chicken fingers, burgers and baked corn; bands play jazz, dixieland, and traditional American folk songs, Confederate flags are everywhere. American folk dances, specifically square dances, are the highlight of the event. Women dress the part, much like the character Scarlett O'Hara in the film Gone with the Wind, and men in Confederate uniforms, boots and hats.

The cemetery has a recreation area where the fraternity holds its quarterly meetings, as well as the Festa Confederada. The festival receives visitors from various parts of Brazil and the world; in 2006 the party attracted 1500 people, and has received such distinguished visitors as Georgia Governor (later US president) Jimmy Carter and his wife Rosalyn, as well as representatives of the US Consulate and press agencies of the United States.

The Confederado community established a Museum of Immigration in Santa Bárbara d'Oeste preserving the history of Brazilian immigration and its benefits to the nation.

== Geography ==
=== Climate ===
Climate data for Santa Bárbara d'Oeste, elevation 589 m (1,932 ft), (2001–2020 normals, extremes 2000–2022)
Month	Jan	Feb	Mar	Apr	May	Jun	Jul	Aug	Sep	Oct	Nov	Dec	Year
Record high °C (°F)	38.0 (100.4)	38.3 (100.9)	37.8 (100.0)	35.6 (96.1)	35.6 (96.1)	32.0 (89.6)	33.4 (92.1)	35.5 (95.9)	39.9 (103.8)	40.8 (105.4)	39.6 (103.3)	37.0 (98.6)	40.8 (105.4)
Mean daily maximum °C (°F)	30.8 (87.4)	31.5 (88.7)	31.4 (88.5)	30.1 (86.2)	26.7 (80.1)	26.4 (79.5)	26.5 (79.7)	27.9 (82.2)	29.9 (85.8)	30.7 (87.3)	30.6 (87.1)	31.1 (88.0)	29.5 (85.0)
Daily mean °C (°F)	25.0 (77.0)	25.3 (77.5)	24.9 (76.8)	23.1 (73.6)	19.5 (67.1)	18.7 (65.7)	18.5 (65.3)	19.7 (67.5)	22.1 (71.8)	23.7 (74.7)	23.9 (75.0)	24.8 (76.6)	22.4 (72.4)
Mean daily minimum °C (°F)	19.3 (66.7)	19.2 (66.6)	18.5 (65.3)	16.1 (61.0)	12.3 (54.1)	11.0 (51.8)	10.5 (50.9)	11.5 (52.7)	14.3 (57.7)	16.8 (62.2)	17.3 (63.1)	18.4 (65.1)	15.4 (59.8)
Record low °C (°F)	10.6 (51.1)	12.0 (53.6)	11.2 (52.2)	9.0 (48.2)	1.9 (35.4)	1.7 (35.1)	−0.2 (31.6)	2.4 (36.3)	3.0 (37.4)	8.0 (46.4)	9.0 (48.2)	10.0 (50.0)	−0.2 (31.6)
Average precipitation mm (inches)	267.2 (10.52)	138.7 (5.46)	146.1 (5.75)	56.1 (2.21)	64.8 (2.55)	37.5 (1.48)	40.7 (1.60)	35.4 (1.39)	47.9 (1.89)	106.9 (4.21)	154.6 (6.09)	190.6 (7.50)	1,286.5 (50.65)
Average precipitation days (≥ 1.0 mm)	14.3	9.6	8.8	3.9	4.5	3.2	3.1	3.2	4.6	8.4	9.5	12.2	85.3
Source: Centro Integrado de Informações Agrometeorológicas

== Demographics ==
Historical population (municipality)
Year	Population	%±
1920	9,621
1940	12,065	25.4%
1950	15,624	29.5%
1960	22,625	44.8%
1970	31,018	37.1%
1980	76,628	147.0%
1991	145,266	89.6%
2000	170,078	17.1%
2010	180,009	5.8%
2022	183,347	1.9%

== Sports ==
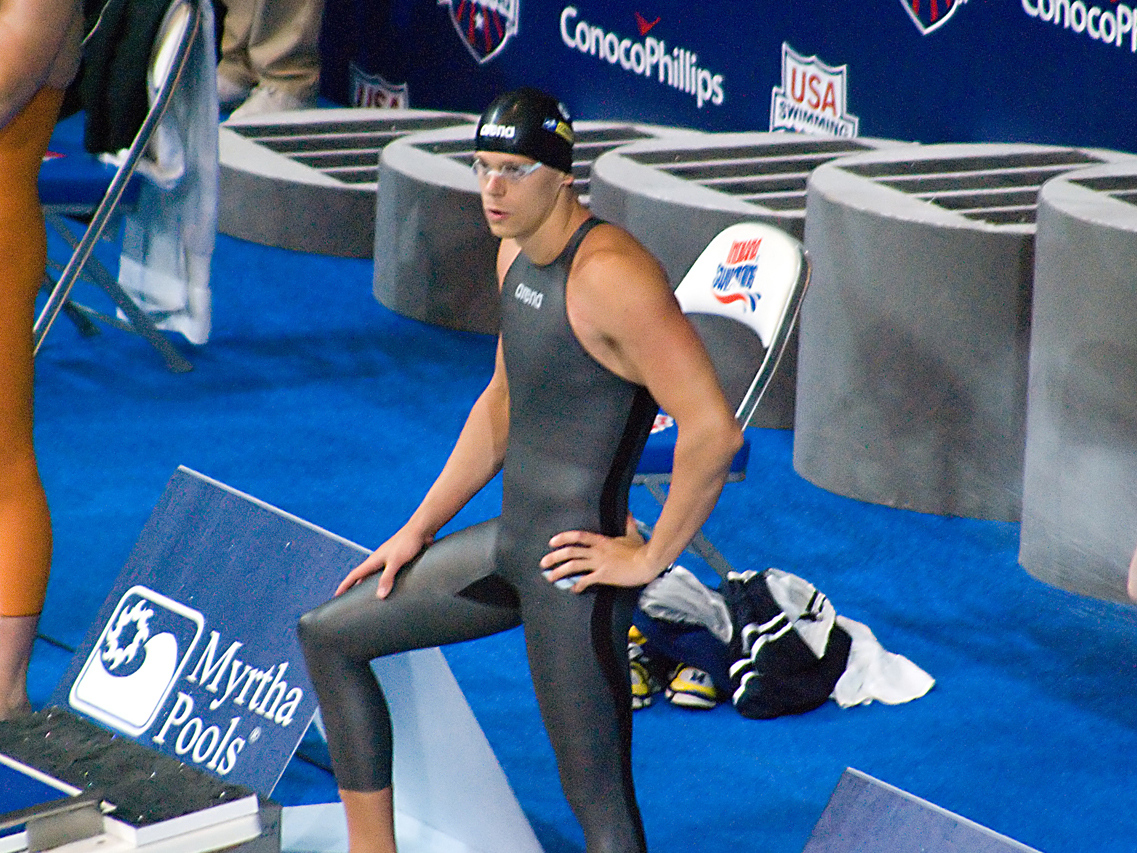
The record-setting swimmer César Cielo was born in Santa Bárbara d'Oeste.

The main football club of the city is the União Barbarense, founded on 22 November 1914. They currently compete in the A1 series of the Campeonato Paulista. Their home stadium is "Stadium Antonio Lins Ribeiro Guimarães" with a capacity of 14,914.

The Esporte Clube Barbarense has a swimming team which has done well in competitions throughout the State of São Paulo in Brazil. The barbarense swimmer, César Cielo Filho, who started his career in this club, received international recognition when he won three gold medals and one silver medal at the 2007 Pan American Games in Rio de Janeiro; he would go on to win the first gold medal by a Brazilian swimmer during the 2008 Summer Olympics. In September 2010 the Esporte Clube Barbarense hosted one of the most important competitions of Brazil's sports calendar: the Jose Finkel Trophy swim. This served as the Brazilian tryouts for the FINA World Swimming Championships of 2010, held in Dubai, United Arab Emirates.

In 2010, the municipal administration of Santa Bárbara d'Oeste began construction of the Polo César Cielo. Following international standards, the first Olympic-size swimming pool in the region will be 50 x 25 meters with a depth of 2.5 meters. R$3.3 million was invested in the project, with funds provided by the Ministry of Sports and city itself. The total area of the water polo facility will be 3.6 million square feet, including bleachers, locker and training rooms.

== Media ==
In telecommunications, the city was served by Telecomunicações de São Paulo. In July 1998, this company was acquired by Telefónica, which adopted the Vivo brand in 2012. The company is currently an operator of cell phones, fixed lines, internet (fiber optics/4G) and television (satellite and cable).

== Religion ==
Christianity is present in the city as follows:

=== Catholic Church ===
The Catholic church in the municipality is part of the Roman Catholic Diocese of Piracicaba.

=== Protestant Church ===
The most diverse evangelical beliefs are present in the city, mainly Pentecostal, including the Assemblies of God in Brazil (the largest evangelical church in the country), Christian Congregation in Brazil, among others. These denominations are growing more and more throughout Brazil.

== See also ==
- List of municipalities in São Paulo
