= William Hutchinson Norris =

American politician

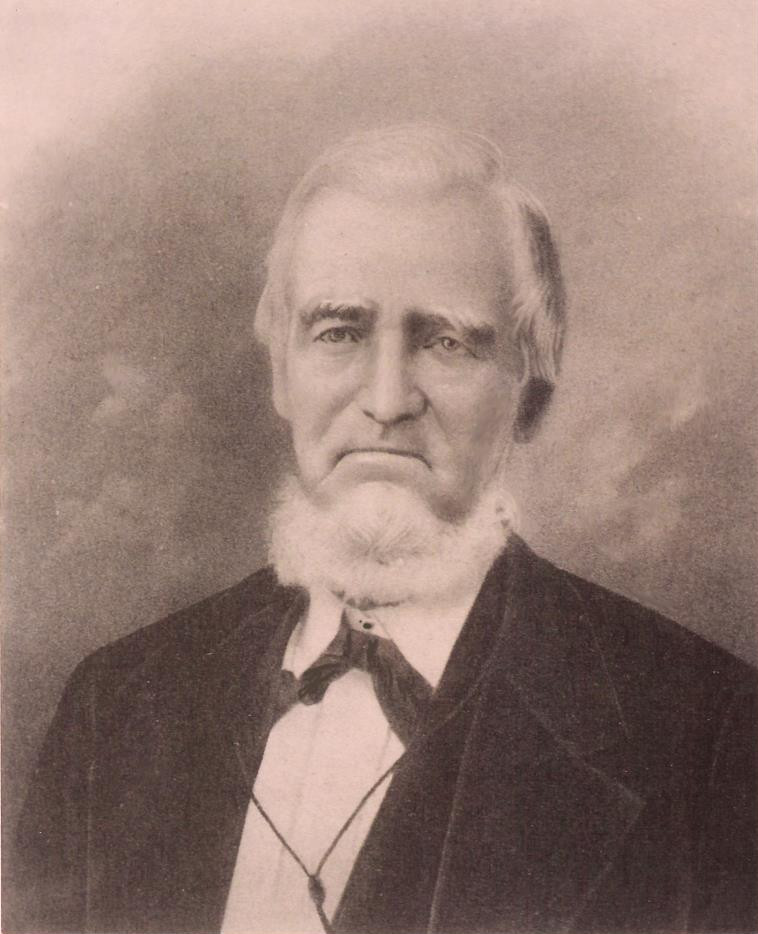
- Illustration of William H. Norris, one of the most prominent Confederados in Brazil.
- Born: 25 September 1800; Oglethorpe, Georgia, U.S.
- Died: 13 July 1893 (aged 92); Santa Bárbara d'Oeste, São Paulo, Brazil

William Hutchinson Norris (September 25, 1800 – July 13, 1893) was an American politician who was the founder of the city of Americana and a settlement in Santa Bárbara d'Oeste. A notable Confederate during American Civil War, Norris was a significant figure in the history of the Confederados following the war.

Norris was a colonel in the militia during the Mexican-American War and an Alabama senator as well, who left the U.S. for Brazil with 30 Confederate families.

== Career in the United States ==
Norris was born in Oglethorpe, Georgia, in 1800. His father was a North Carolina born merchant named William Norris (1757 in Johnston County, North Carolina - New Orleans, Louisiana) who was largely based in Charleston, South Carolina and New Orleans, Louisiana and was a North Carolina State Senator, his mother, Nancy Watkins (1767 in Williamsburg, Virginia - 1852 in Charleston, South Carolina) was a relative of Thomas Jefferson. His brother Frank Hutchinson Norris (1804 in Savannah, Georgia - 1878 in Santa Bárbara d'Oeste) was a South Carolina State Senator and merchant, who was a graduate of the College of Charleston. Norris served in the Alabama State Legislature, both as a senator and member of the Alabama House of Representatives from Dallas County during the late 1830s and early 1840s. On December 2, 1861, he was elected grand master of the Alabama Masonic Lodge.

== Career in Brazil ==
On 27 December 1865, Norris, his brother, and his son Robert C. Norris arrived in Rio de Janeiro aboard the ship South America. It is uncertain what his departure point was, probably New Orleans or Mobile. Norris had left his home at Mount Pleasant in Monroe County. The only member of this immediate family who did not accompany the group to Brazil was his son Francis Johnson Norris.

Norris helped establish a Confederate American presence in Americana and Santa Bárbara d'Oeste where slavery was still legal, and he began planting cotton. During that period, Norris served as imperial congressman for the state of São Paulo, and he was commissioned the rank of Colonel of the National Guard.

On 10 January 1867, the rest of the Norris family left New Orleans aboard the Talisman bound for Rio. After a bad storm, with damage to the ship, they did not reach Rio until April 19, 1867.

Norris died at Santa Bárbara d'Oeste on July 13, 1893.

== Family ==
Norris's parents were William Norris, born 31 March 1757 in Johnston County, North Carolina, and Nancy Watkins, born 1772 in Augusta County, Virginia. They married in Wilkes County, Georgia in the late 1780s, and their marriage bond was posted in February 1792. In 1793, a portion of Wilkes County became part of the new Oglethorpe County where he was born in 1800. Norris's father, William Norris, served in a North Carolina regiment in the American Revolutionary War. His grave was marked by the Daughters of the American Revolution in Cataula, Georgia at a Baptist church in the area.

Harry Alexander Davis wrote a long (the typed manuscript, held at the US Library of Congress, is nearly 1,500 pages long) unpublished work about several Norris families. He claims that Norris's parents were William Norris (b. 1758 Maryland) and Sarah Rigdon, the daughter of Alexander Rigdon of Harford County. This claim, like others in the Davis Manuscript, is controversial and unattributed; The Rigdons of Maryland has a well-documented entry on Alexander Rigdon, and there is no indication that he ever had a daughter named Sarah as stated by Davis nor is there any indication that a Sarah Rigdon married into the Norris family.

In approximately 1812, the family relocated to Jasper County and shortly before 1820, Norris migrated to Alabama until he moved permanently to Brazil.

His brother Frank Hutchinson Norris (1804–1878) married Libby Jefferson Hopkins (1812–1890), a native of Annapolis, Maryland in 1835. Frank was a South Carolina State Senator and Merchant in Charleston. His daughter Sarah Ann Norris (1841–1907) was born in Charleston, South Carolina. Frank arrived in Brazil in 1865 with his brother. His daughter Sarah married Antonio Bernardes Pinto (1843–1892), a member of the Lower Brazilian Gentry. Frank Norris attended The Citadel from 1820 to 1821, the College of Charleston from 1821 to 1823, and graduated from the College of William & Mary in 1825. His son Frank Hutchinson Norris II (1836 Savannah, Georgia - 1862 New Orleans, Louisiana) was a graduate of the United States Naval Academy, and died in the Battle of New Orleans.

Before his marriage to Mary Black, Norris was married to Melinda Black, who is thought to have been a cousin of Mary.

Norris had three sons-in-law: Willie Daniel (married to Nancy Angeline), Edward Townsend and Joseph Whitaker.
