= Estação =

Municipality in Rio Grande do Sul, Brazil

Coordinates: 27°54′39″S 52°15′36″W

- Municipality
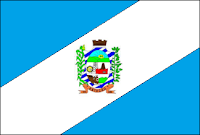
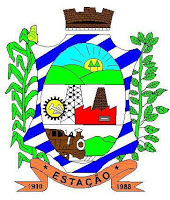
- Flag Coat of arms
- Interactive map of Estação
- Country: Brazil
- Time zone: UTC−3 (BRT)

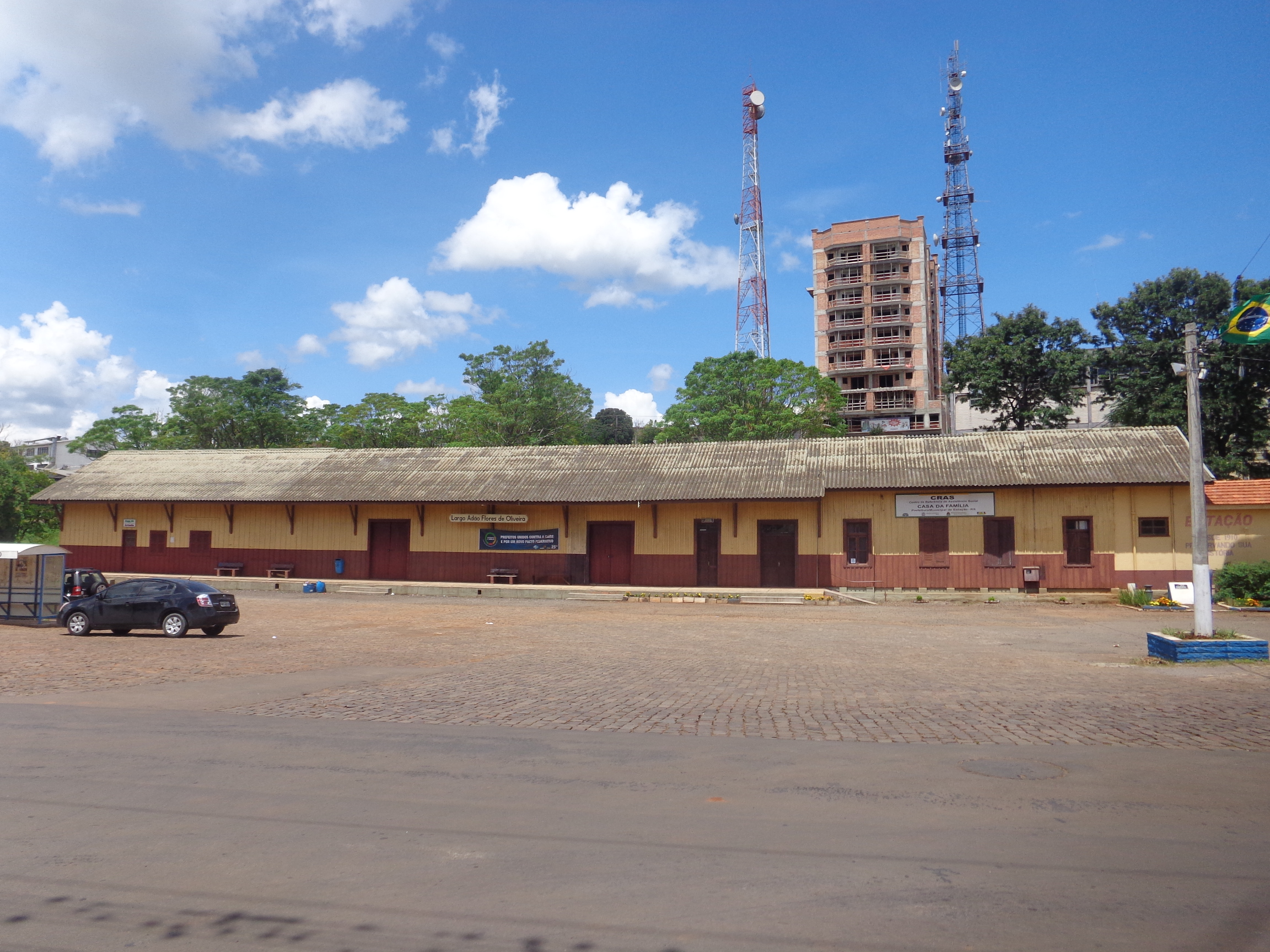

Estação is a municipality in the state of Rio Grande do Sul, Brazil. As of 2020, the estimated population was 5,940.

== See also ==
- List of municipalities in Rio Grande do Sul
