= Pérola =

Municipality in Paraná, Brazil

- Municipality
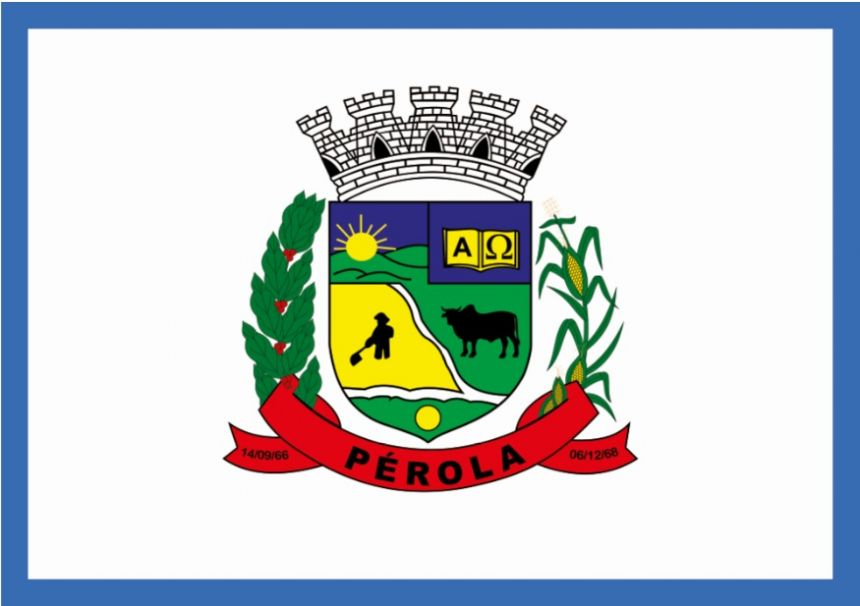
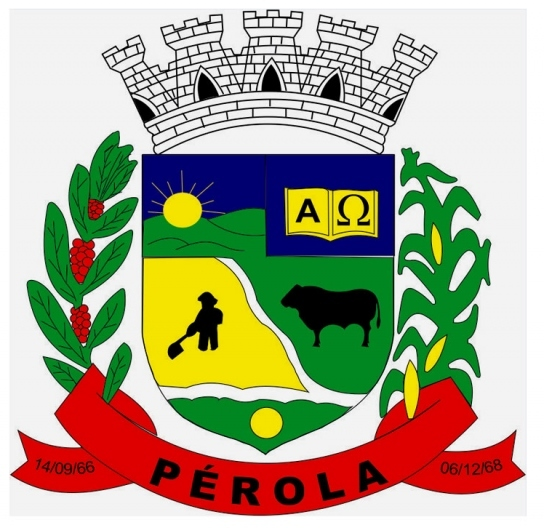
- Flag Coat of arms
- Interactive map of Pérola
- Coordinates: 23°48′13″S 53°40′53″W
- Country: Brazil
- Region: Southern
- State: Paraná
- Mesoregion: Noroeste Paranaense

Population (2020)
  - Total: 11,321
- Time zone: UTC−3 (BRT)

Pérola is a municipality in the state of Paraná in the Southern Region of Brazil.

== See also ==
- List of municipalities in Paraná
