= Huizhanzhongxin station =

Huizhanzhongxin station (simplified Chinese: 会展中心站; traditional Chinese: 會展中心站; pinyin: Huìzhǎn Zhōngxīn Zhàn; lit. 'Convention and Exhibition Center station') may refer to:

- Huizhanzhongxin station (Tianjin Metro), a station on Line 9 of Tianjin Metro
- Huizhanzhongxin station (Xi'an Metro), a station on Line 2 of Xi'an Metro

== See also ==
- Convention Center station (disambiguation)
- Exhibition station (disambiguation)
- Exhibition Center station (disambiguation)
