= Kutao station =

Qingdao Metro station

Kutao 枯桃
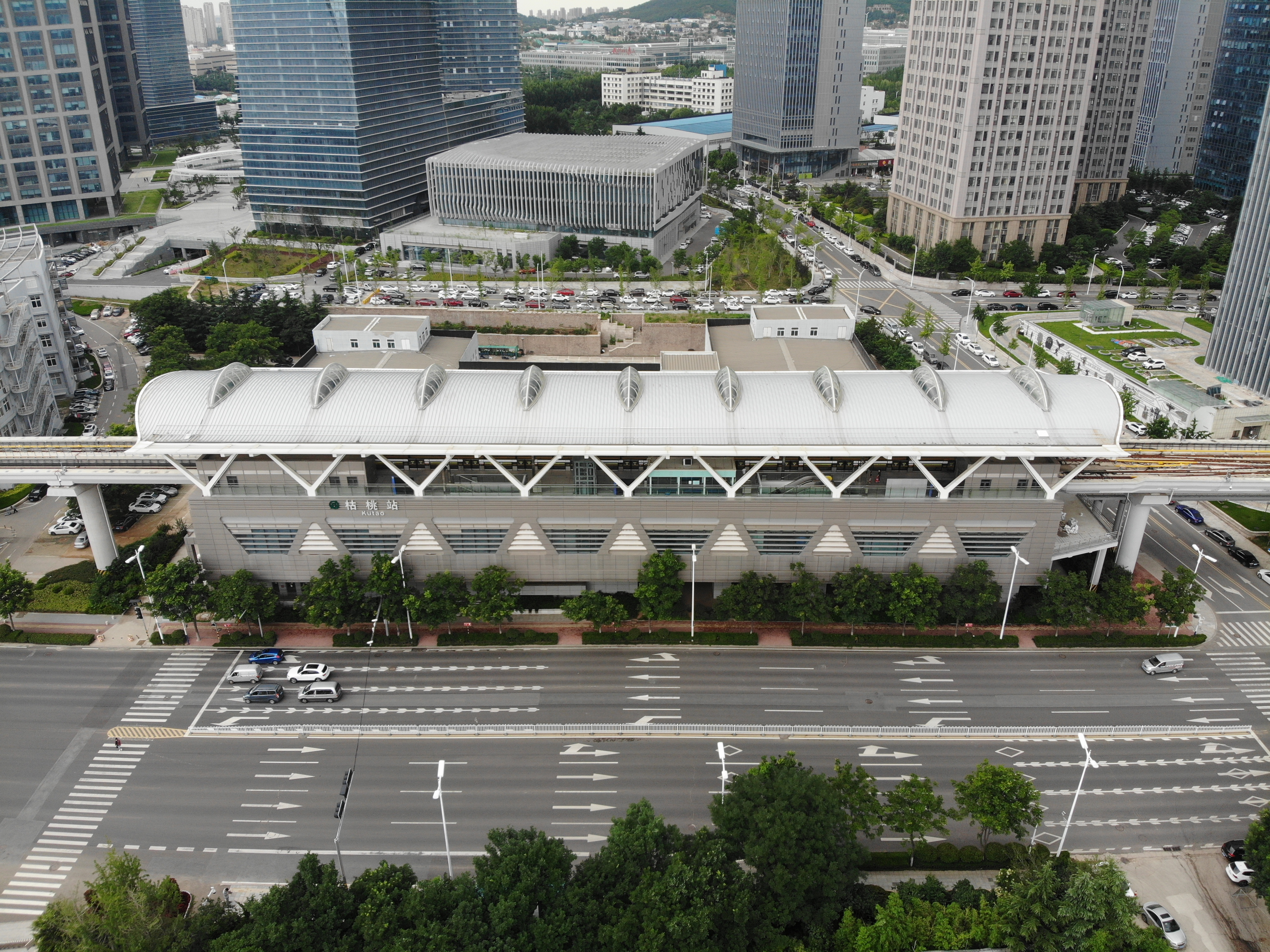

General information
- Location: Laoshan District, Qingdao, Shandong; China
- Coordinates: 36°08′52″N 120°28′56″E
- Operated by: Qingdao Metro Corporation
- Line(s): Oceantec Valley Line
- Platforms: 2 (2 side platforms)

History
- Opened: 23 April 2018; 7 years ago

Services
Preceding station	Qingdao Metro	Following station
Zhangcun towards Miaoling Road	Oceantec Valley Line	Ocean University of China towards Qiangu Mountain

Kutao (Chinese: 枯桃) is a station on the Oceantec Valley Line of the Qingdao Metro. It opened on 23 April 2018.

== Gallery ==
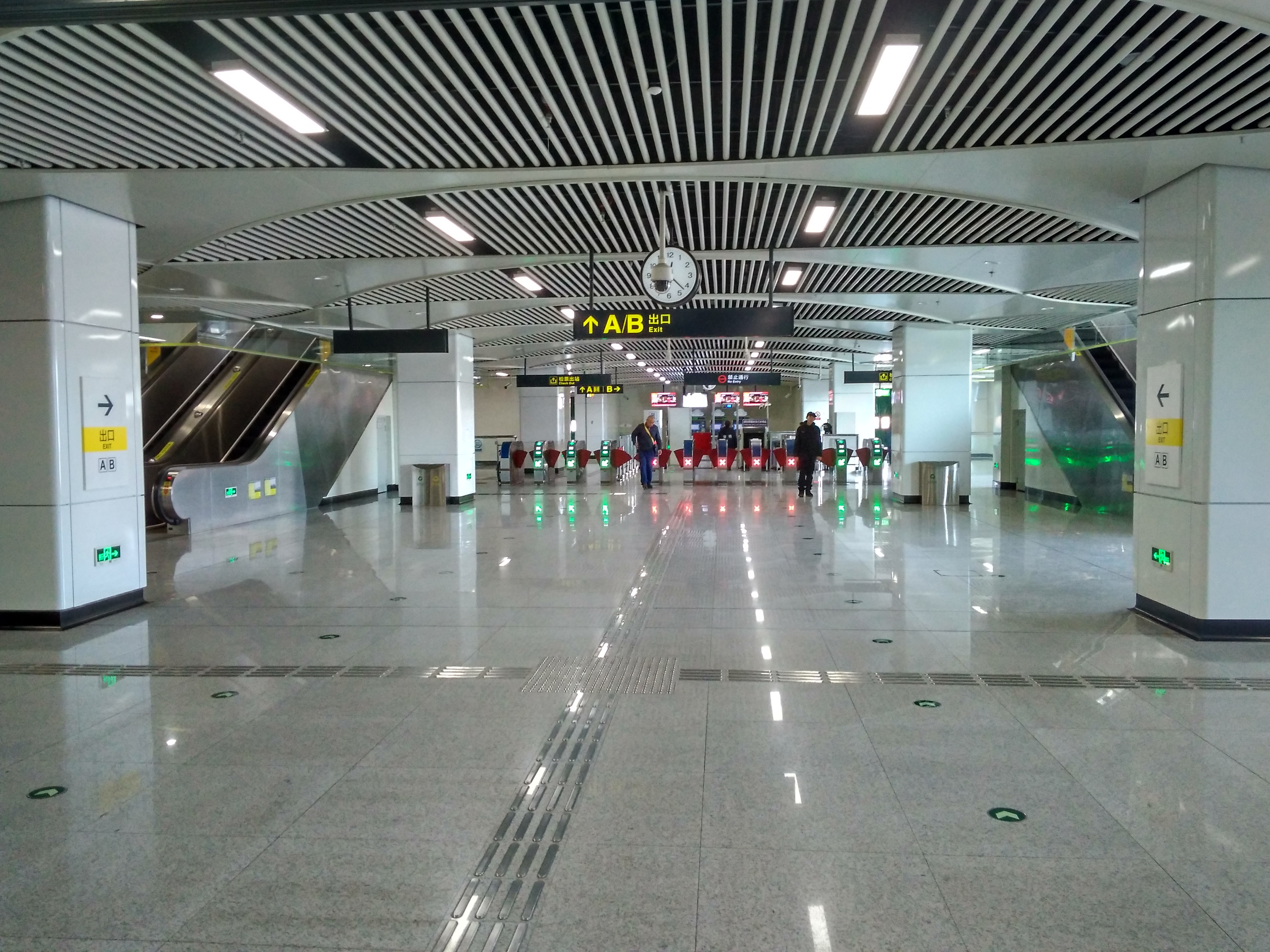
Concourse

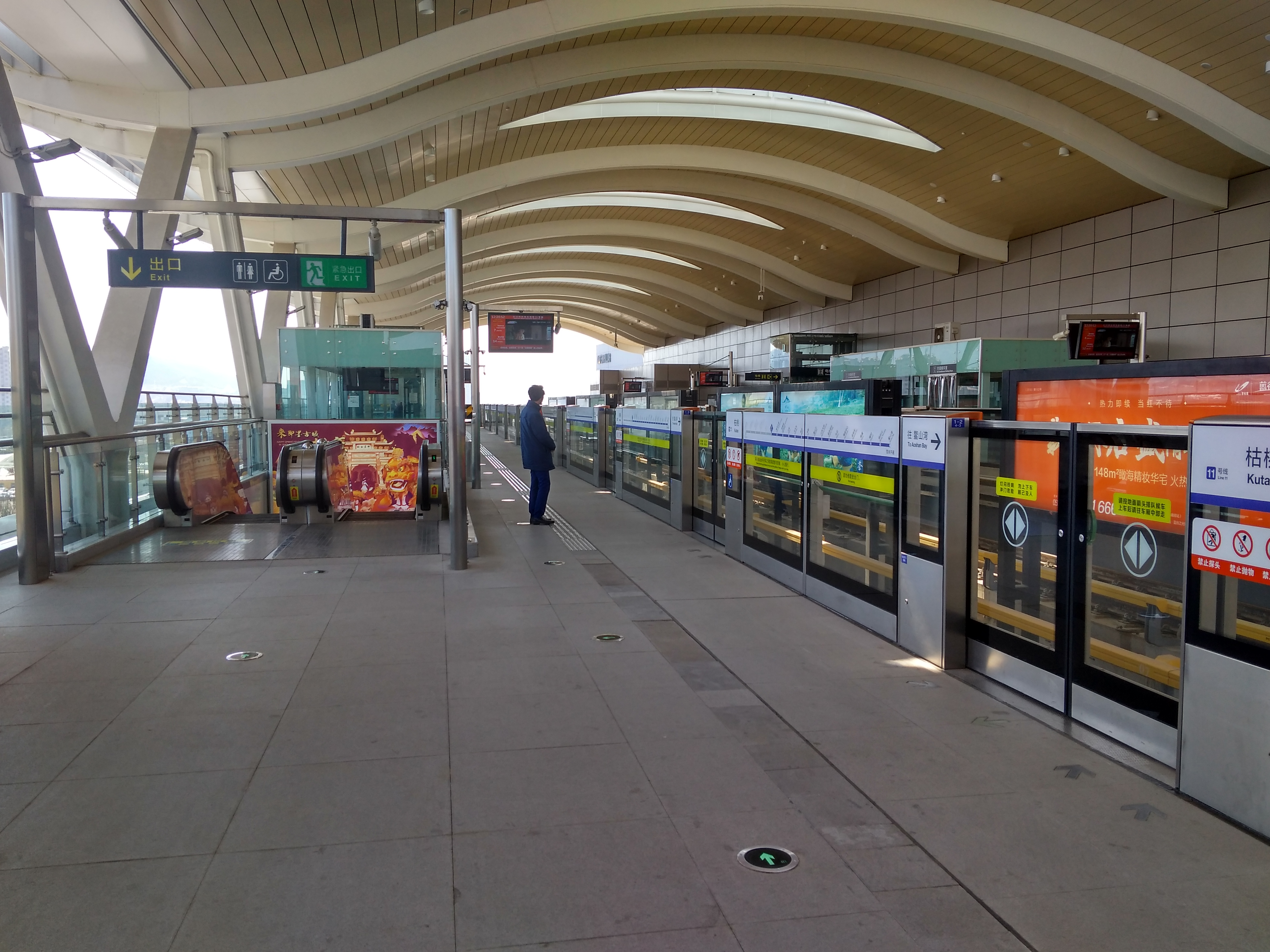
Platform
