= Beijiushui station =

Qingdao Metro station

Beijiushui 北九水
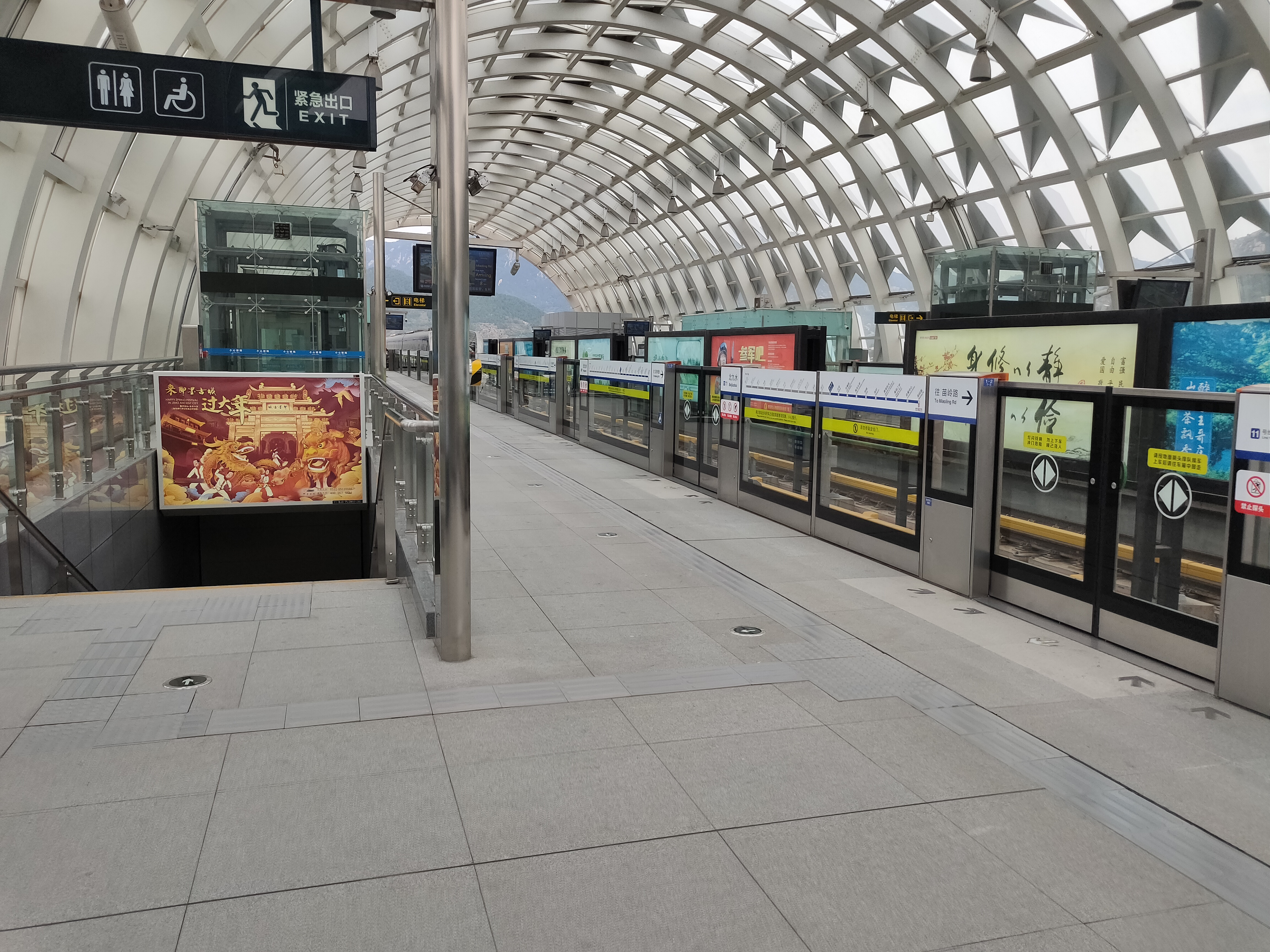

General information
- Location: Laoshan District, Qingdao, Shandong; China
- Coordinates: 36°14′19″N 120°33′15″E
- Operated by: Qingdao Metro Corporation
- Line(s): Oceantec Valley Line
- Platforms: 2 (2 side platforms)

History
- Opened: 23 April 2018; 7 years ago

Services
Preceding station	Qingdao Metro	Following station
Beizhai towards Miaoling Road	Oceantec Valley Line	Miaoshi towards Qiangu Mountain

Beijiushui (Chinese: 北九水) is a station on the Oceantec Valley Line of the Qingdao Metro. It opened on 23 April 2018.

== Gallery ==
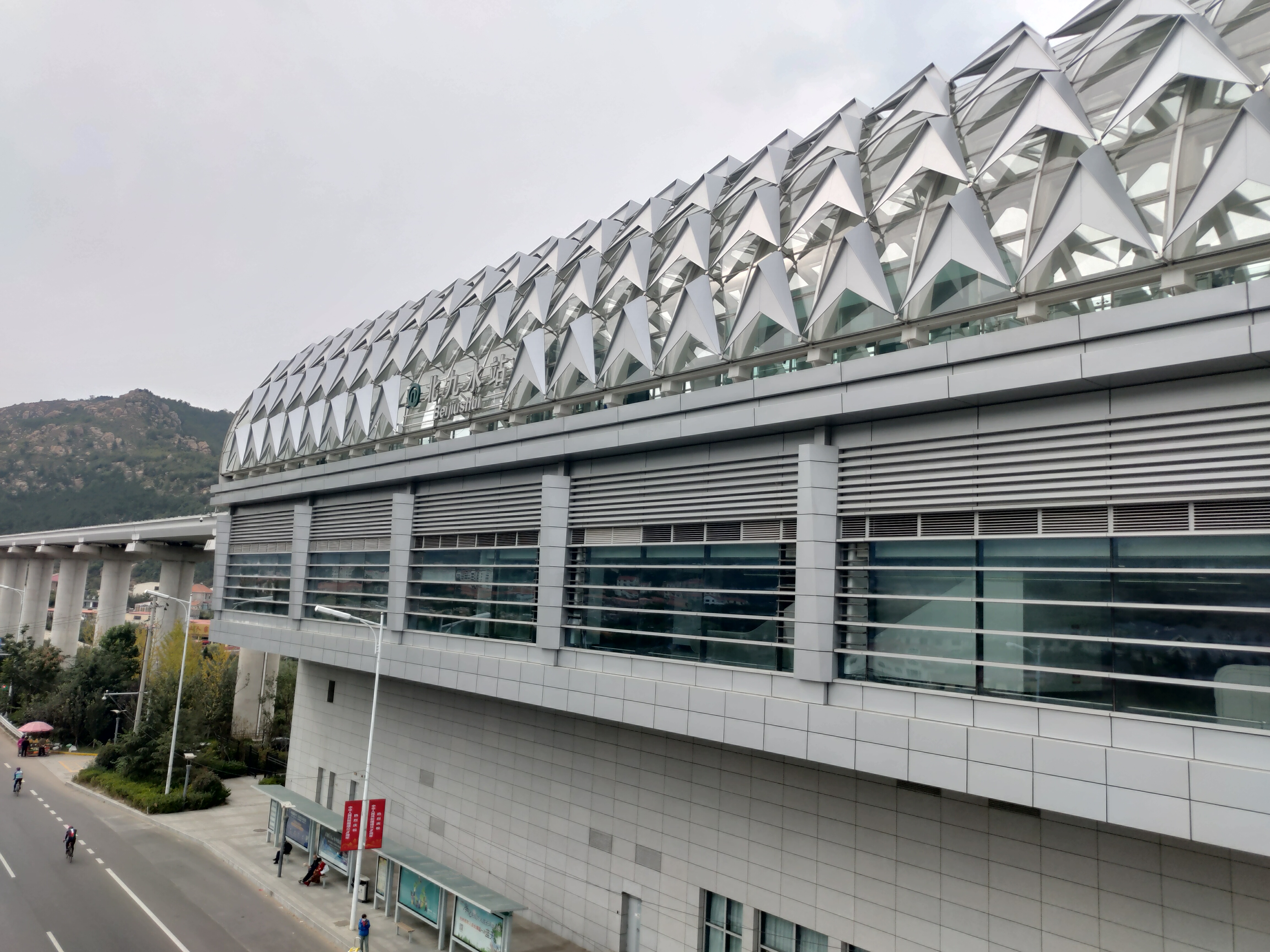
Exterior

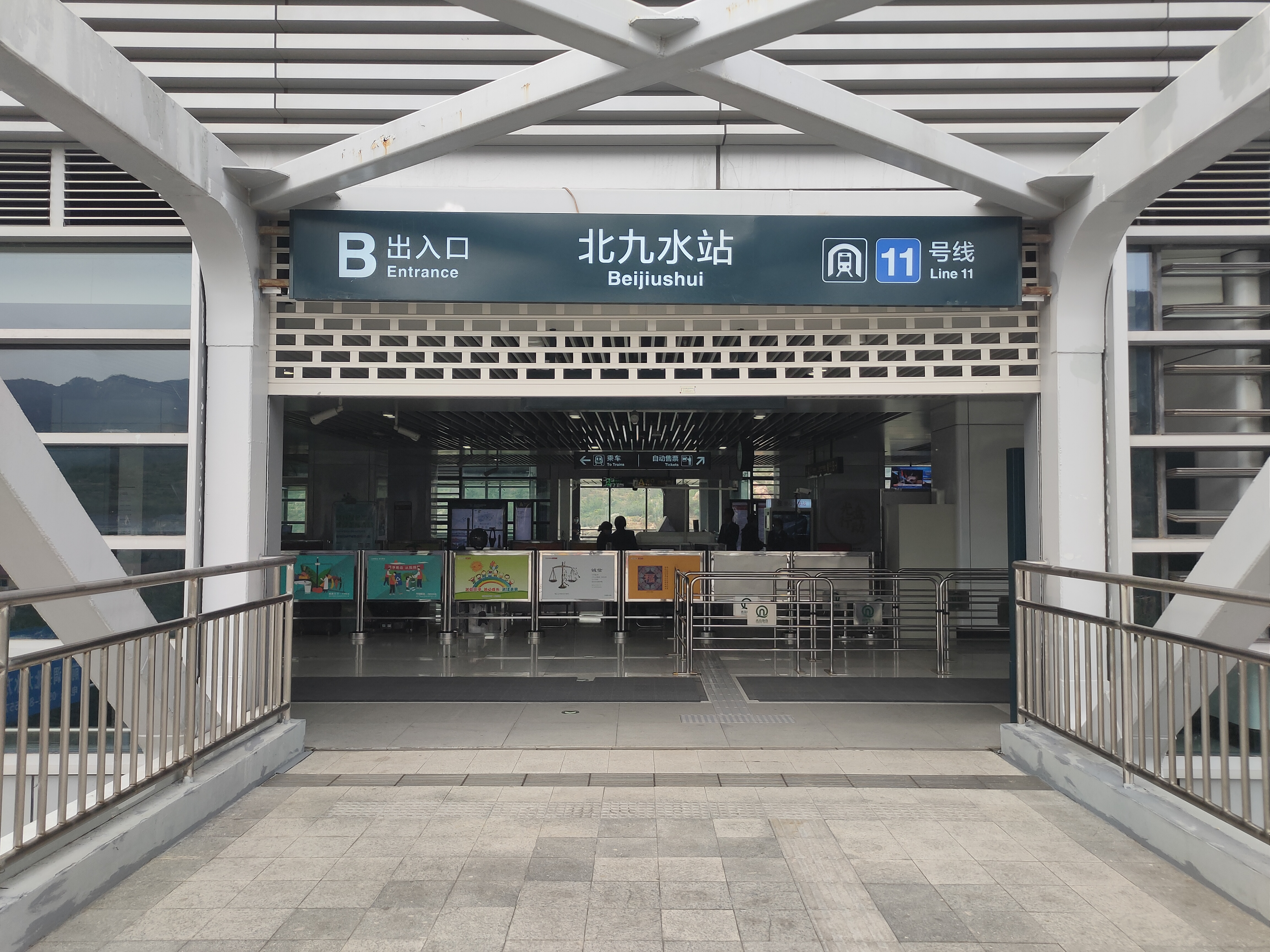
Entrance B

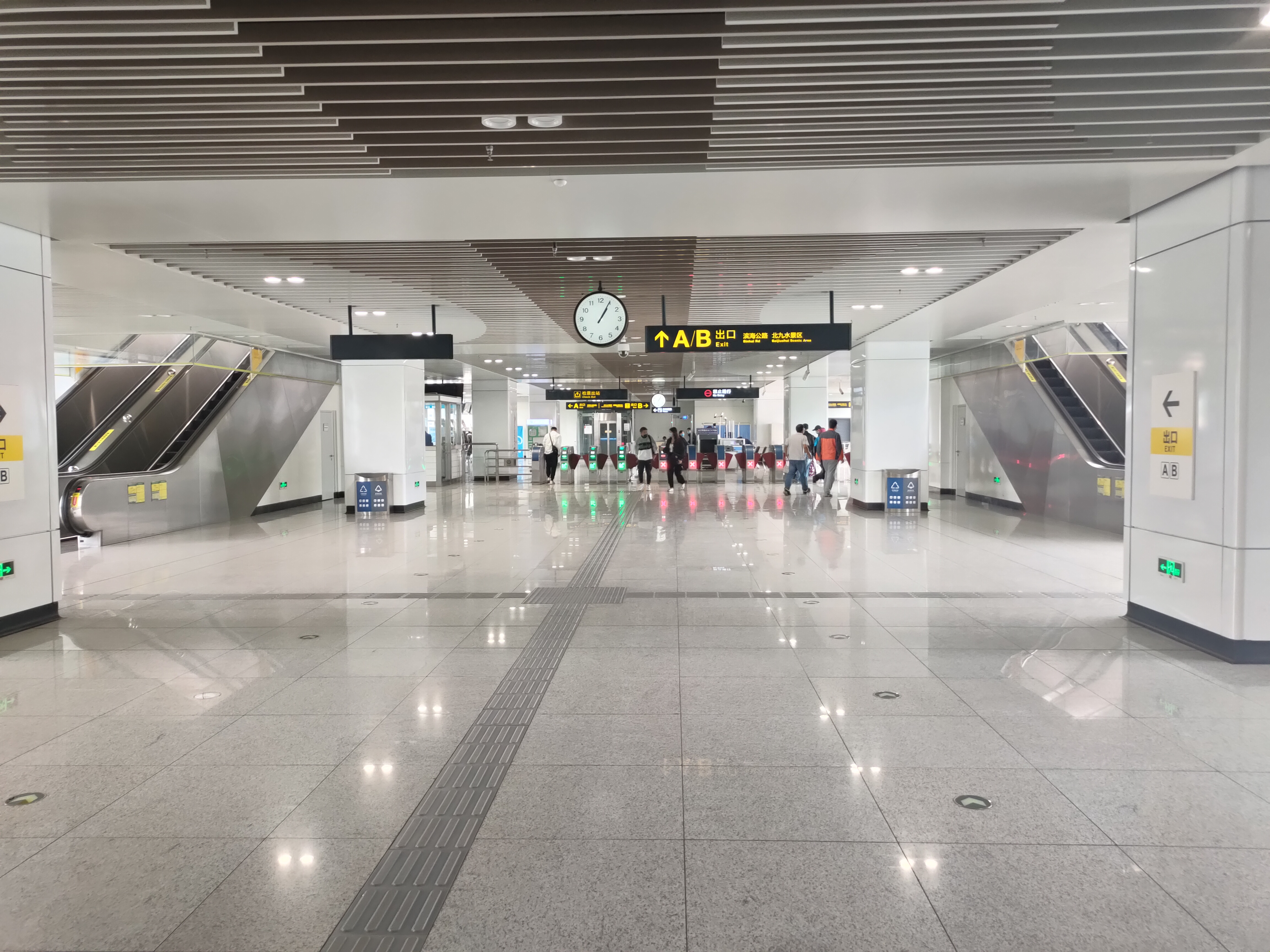
Concourse
