= Miaoshi station =

Qingdao Metro station

Miaoshi 庙石
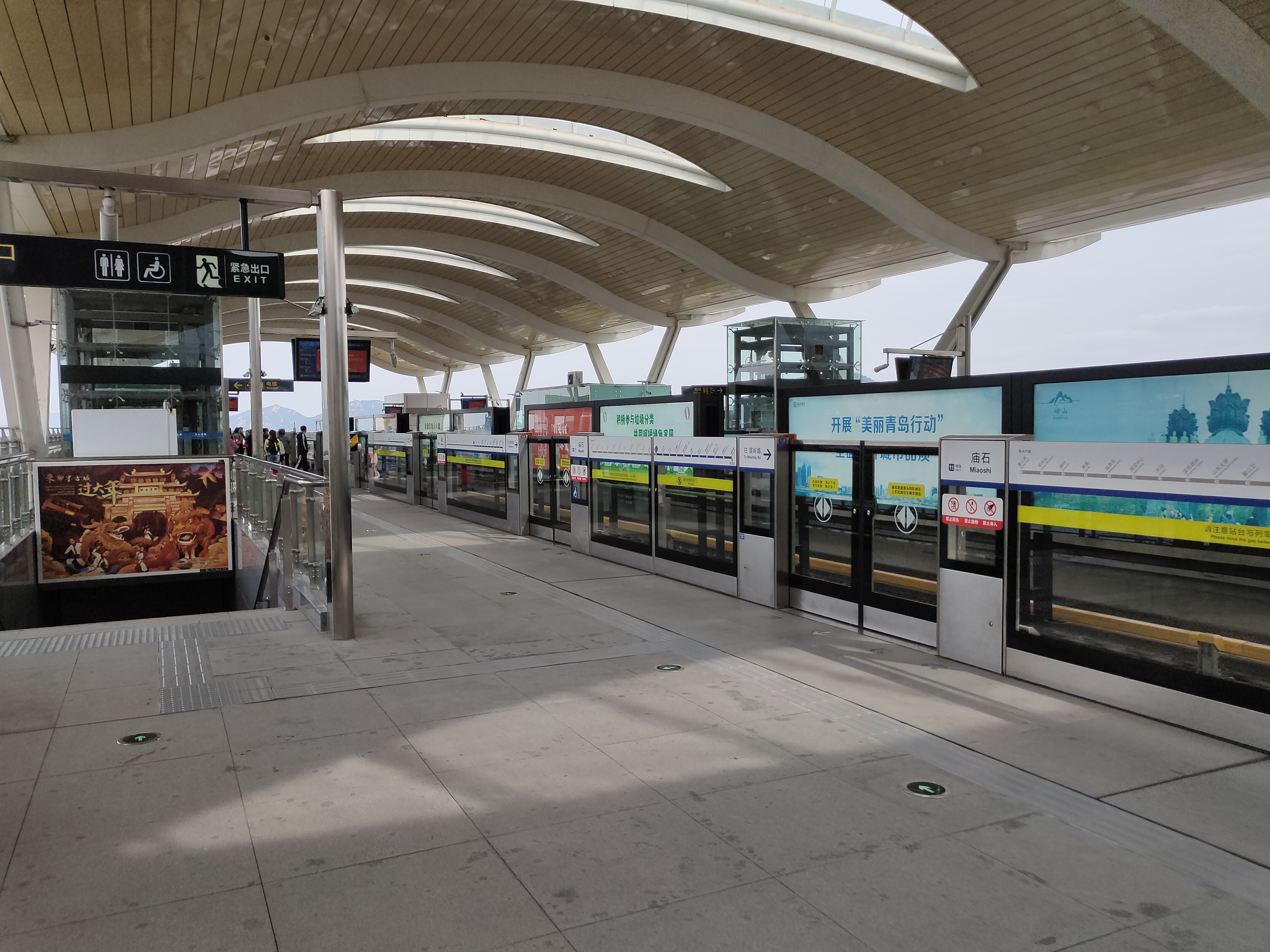

General information
- Location: Laoshan District, Qingdao, Shandong; China
- Coordinates: 36°17′03″N 120°36′06″E
- Operated by: Qingdao Metro Corporation
- Line(s): Oceantec Valley Line
- Platforms: 2 (2 side platforms)

History
- Opened: 23 April 2018; 7 years ago

Services
Preceding station	Qingdao Metro	Following station
Beijiushui towards Miaoling Road	Oceantec Valley Line	Puli towards Qiangu Mountain

Miaoshi (Chinese: 庙石) is a station on the Oceantec Valley Line of the Qingdao Metro. It opened on 23 April 2018.

== Gallery ==
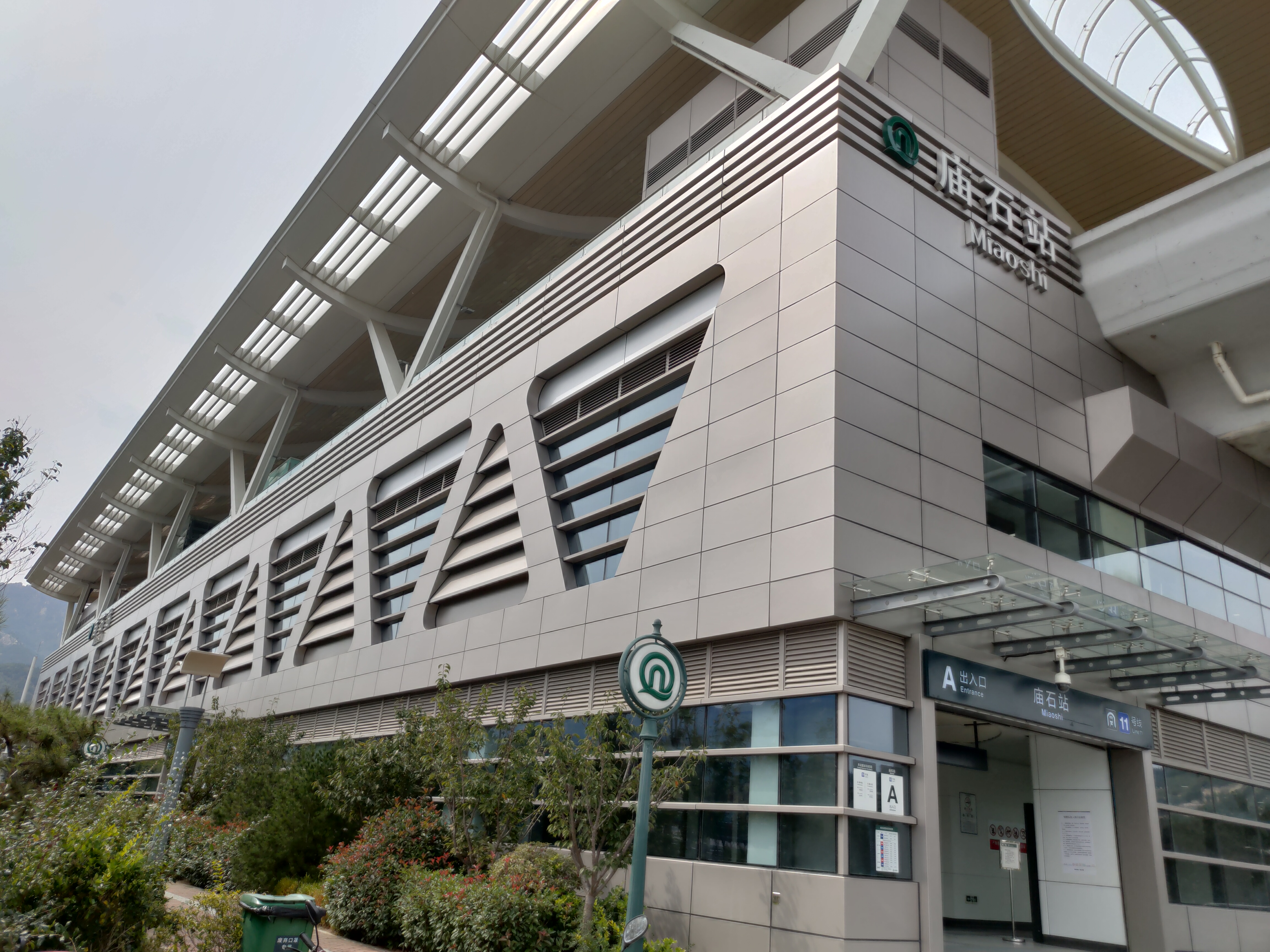
Exterior

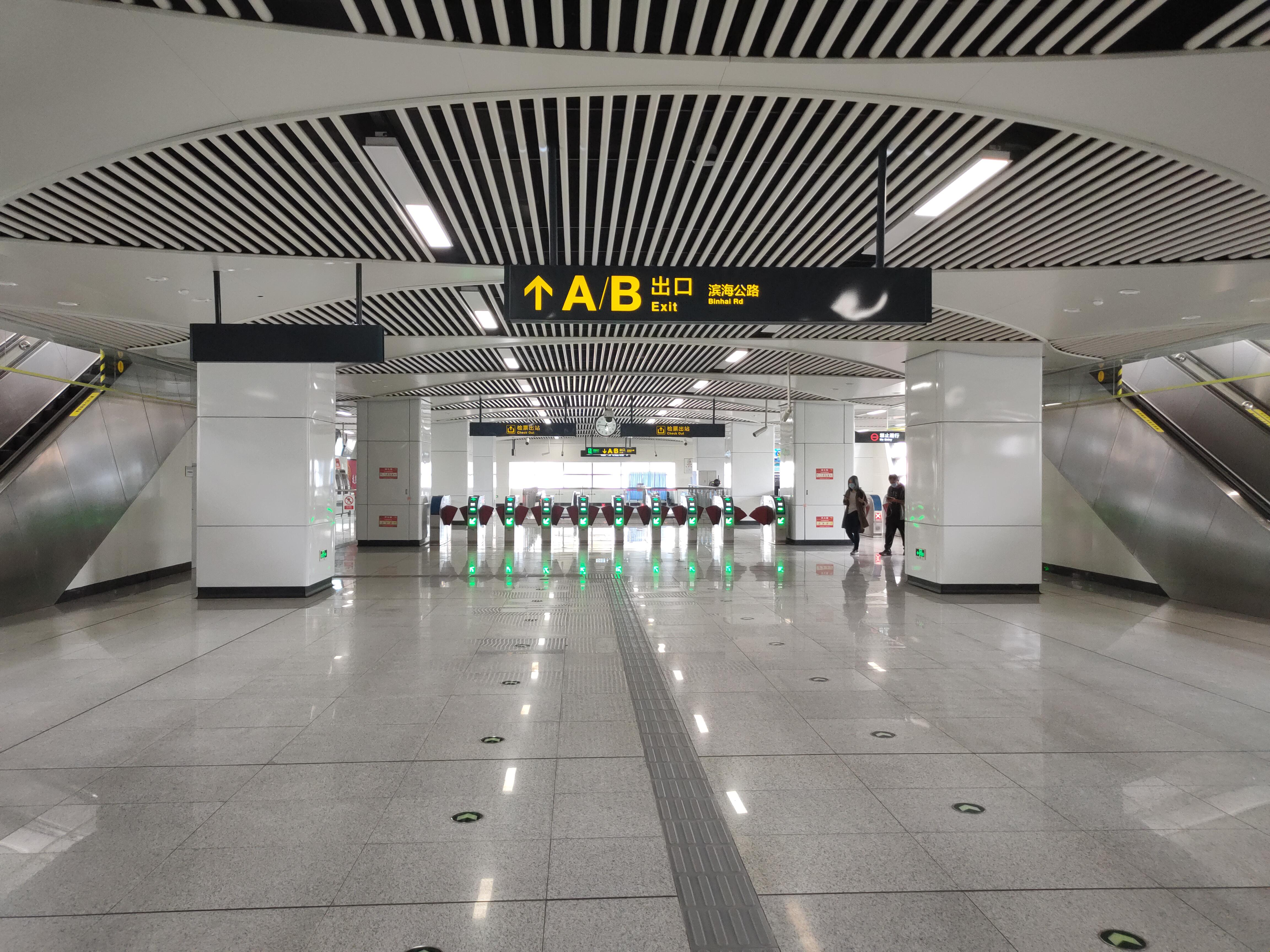
Concourse
