= Zhangcun station =

Qingdao Metro station

Zhangcun 张村
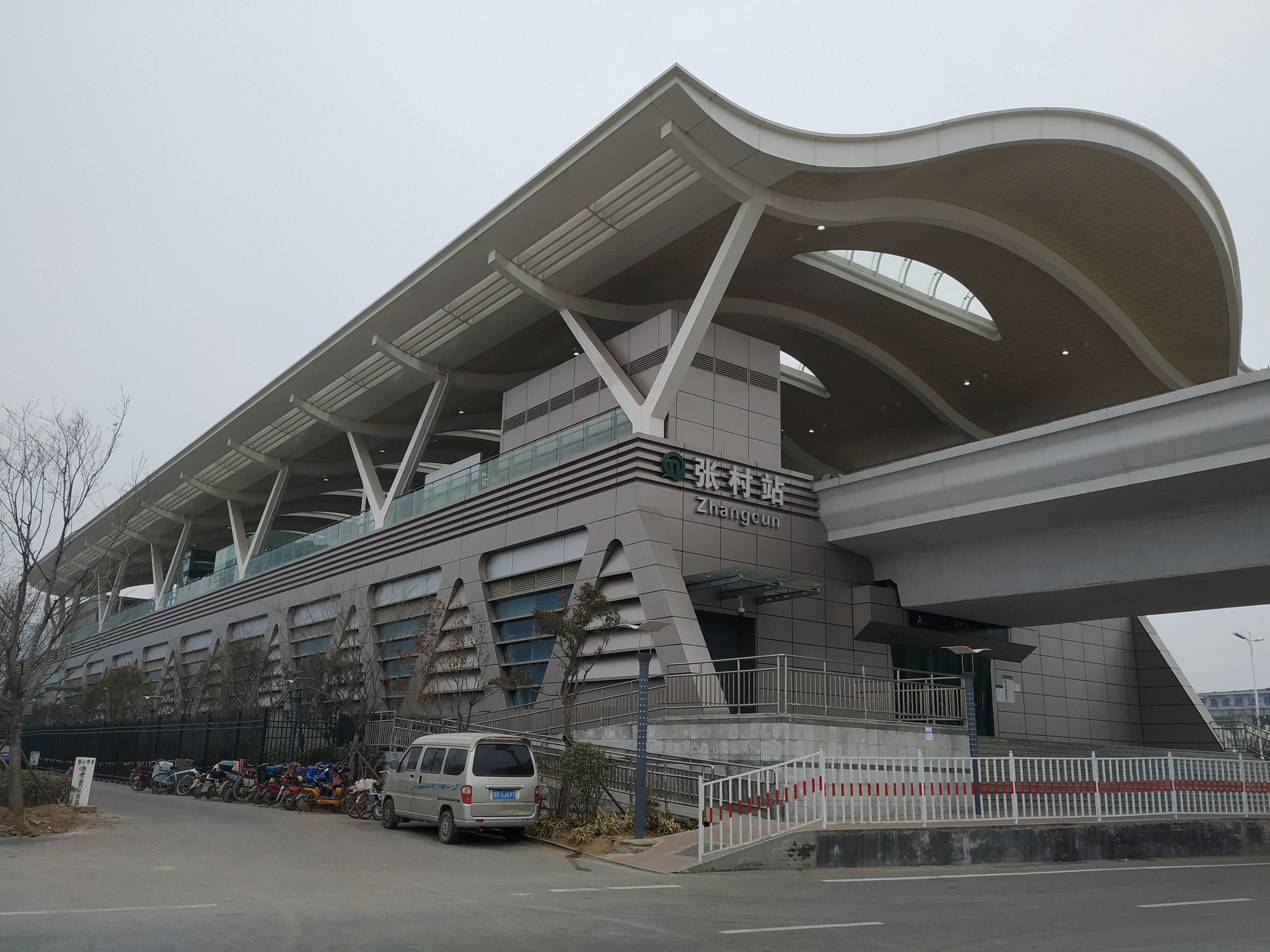

General information
- Location: Laoshan District, Qingdao, Shandong; China
- Coordinates: 36.1409°N 120.4806°E
- Operated by: Qingdao Metro Corporation
- Line(s): Line 4 Oceantec Valley Line
- Platforms: 4 (2 side platforms, 1 island platform)

History
- Opened: 23 April 2018; 7 years ago

Services
Preceding station	Qingdao Metro	Following station
Keyuanjing 7th Road towards Hall of the People	Line 4	Pengjiazhuang towards Dahedong
Qingdao University of Science & Technology towards Miaoling Road	Oceantec Valley Line	Kutao towards Qiangu Mountain
Location

Zhangcun (Chinese: 张村) is a station on Line 4 and the Oceantec Valley Line of the Qingdao Metro. It opened on 23 April 2018.

== Gallery ==
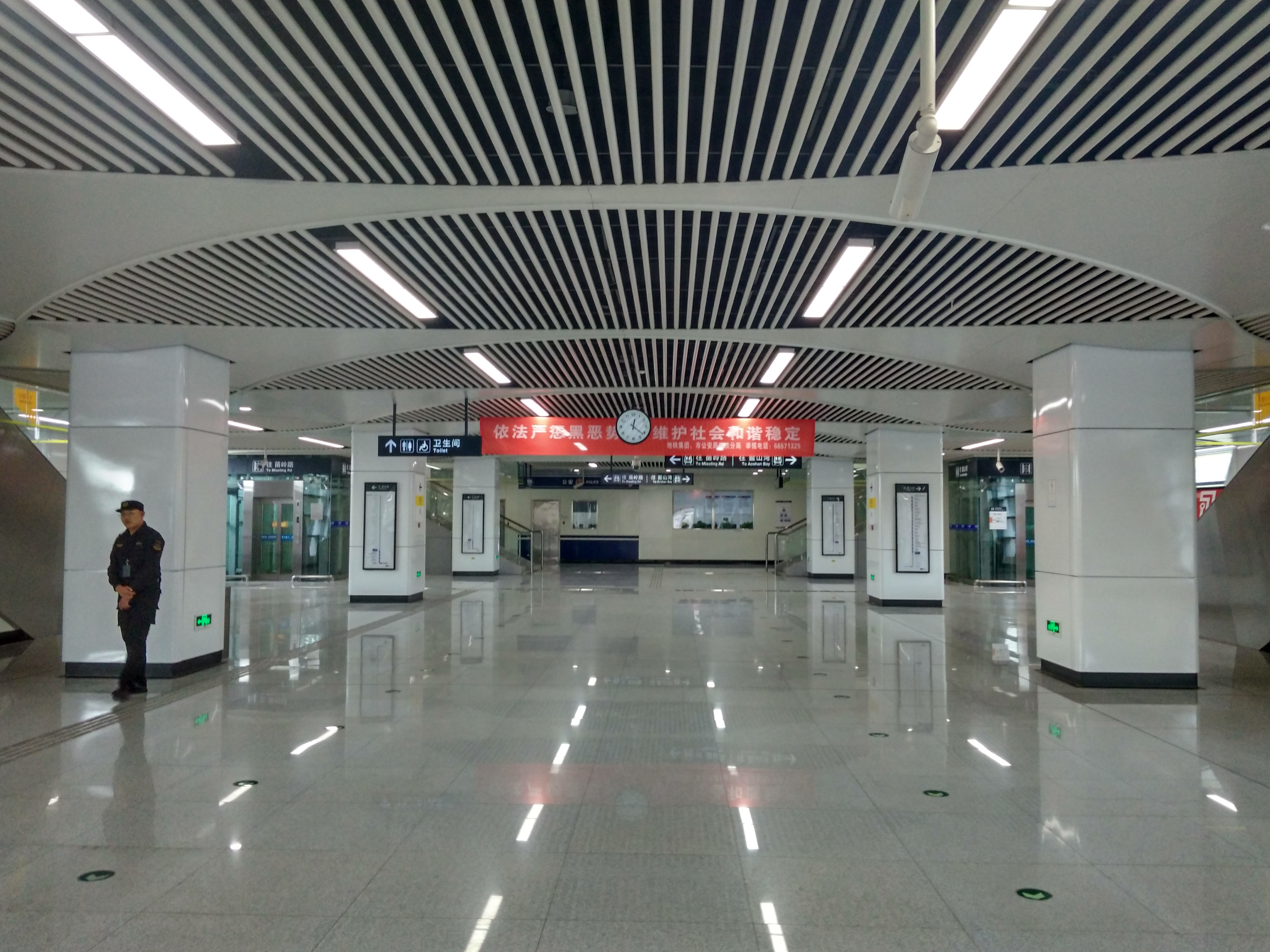
Concourse

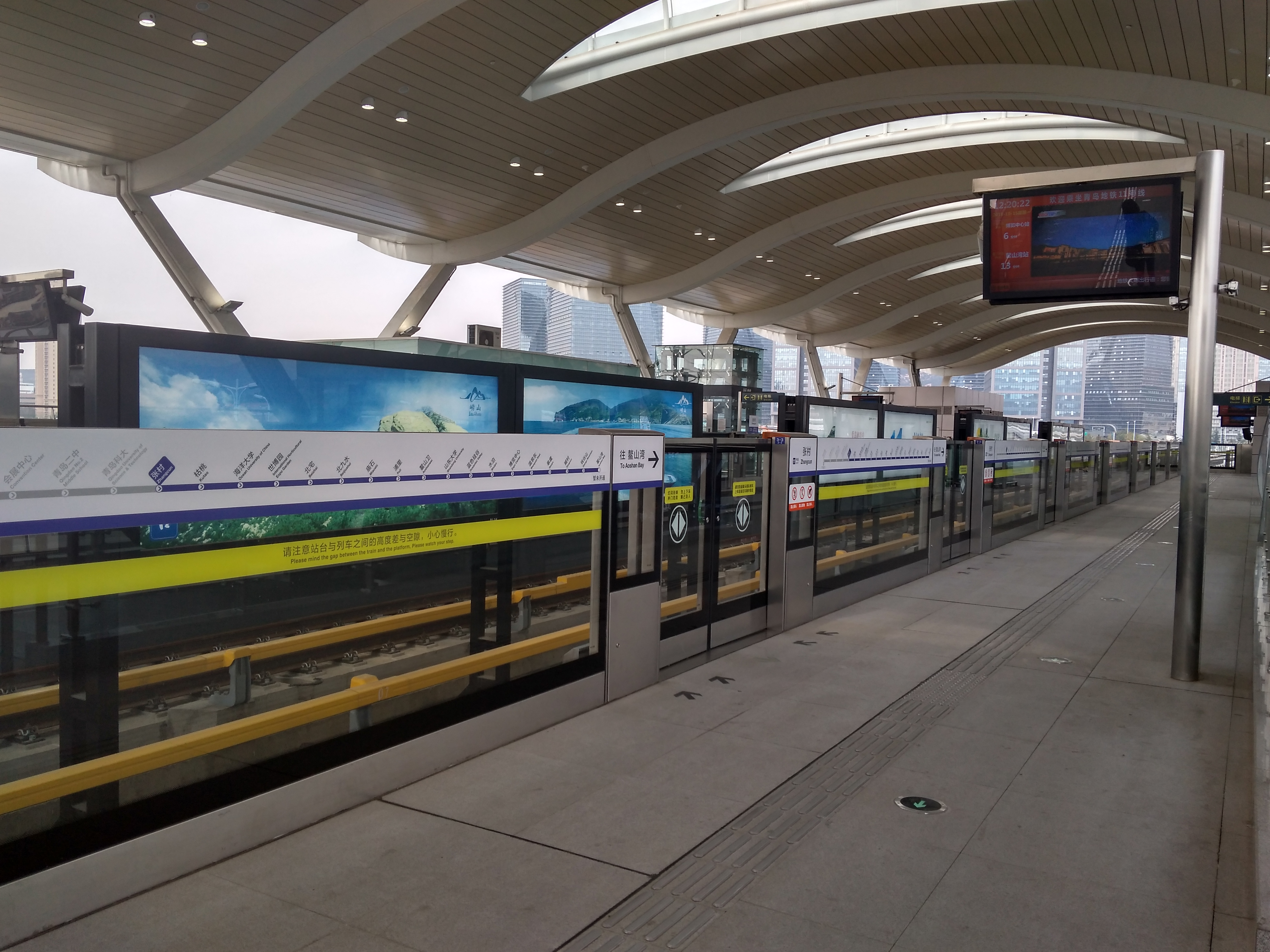
Line 11 platform
