= Beizhai station =

Qingdao Metro station

Beizhai 北宅
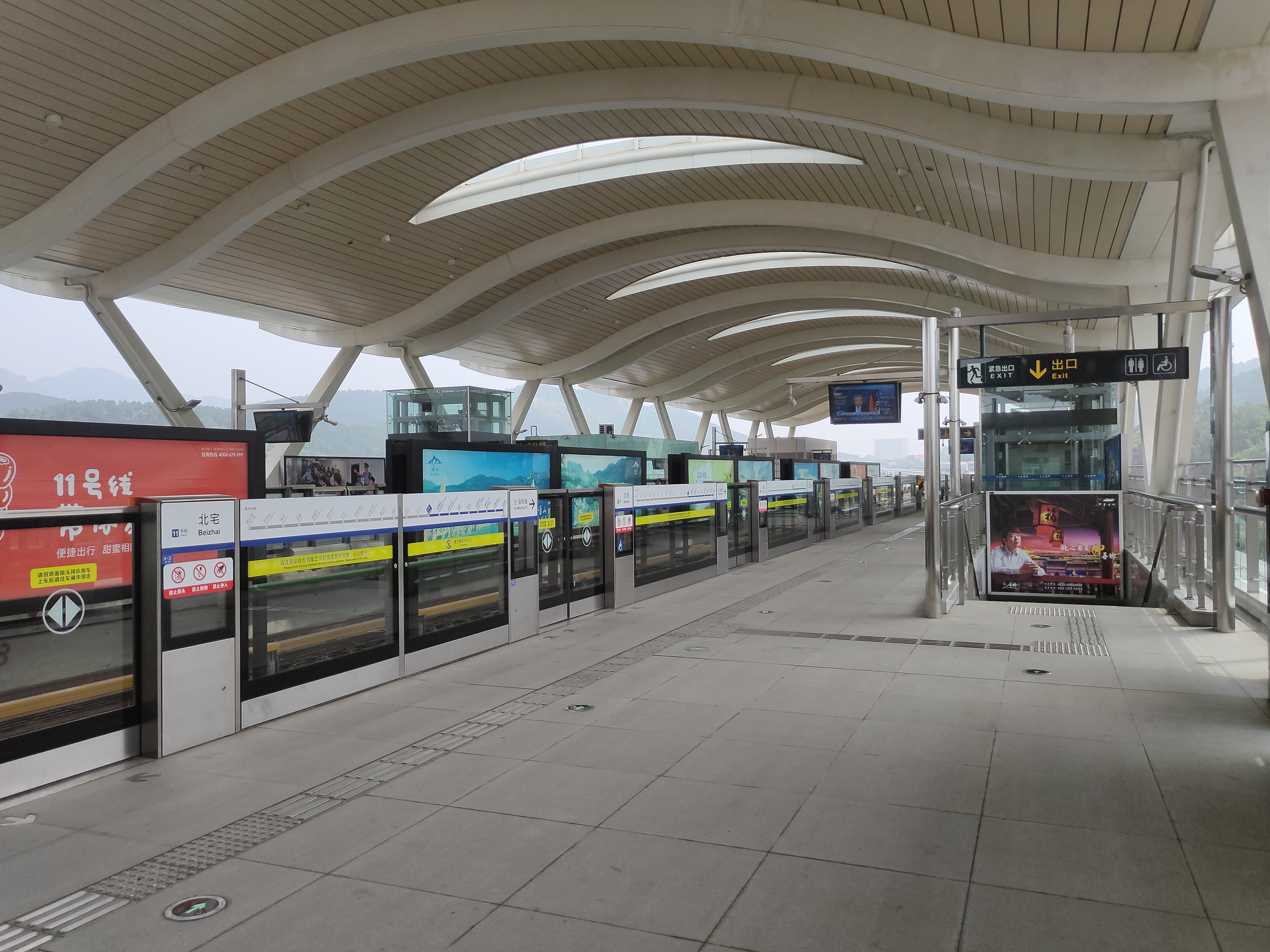

General information
- Location: Laoshan District, Qingdao, Shandong; China
- Coordinates: 36°12′49″N 120°31′48″E
- Operated by: Qingdao Metro Corporation
- Line(s): Oceantec Valley Line
- Platforms: 2 (2 side platforms)

History
- Opened: 23 April 2018; 7 years ago

Services
| Preceding station | Qingdao Metro | Following station |
|---|---|---|
| International Horticultural Expo Garden towards Miaoling Road | Oceantec Valley Line | Beijiushui towards Qiangu Mountain |

Beizhai (Chinese: 北宅) is a station on the Oceantec Valley Line of the Qingdao Metro. It opened on 23 April 2018.

== Gallery ==
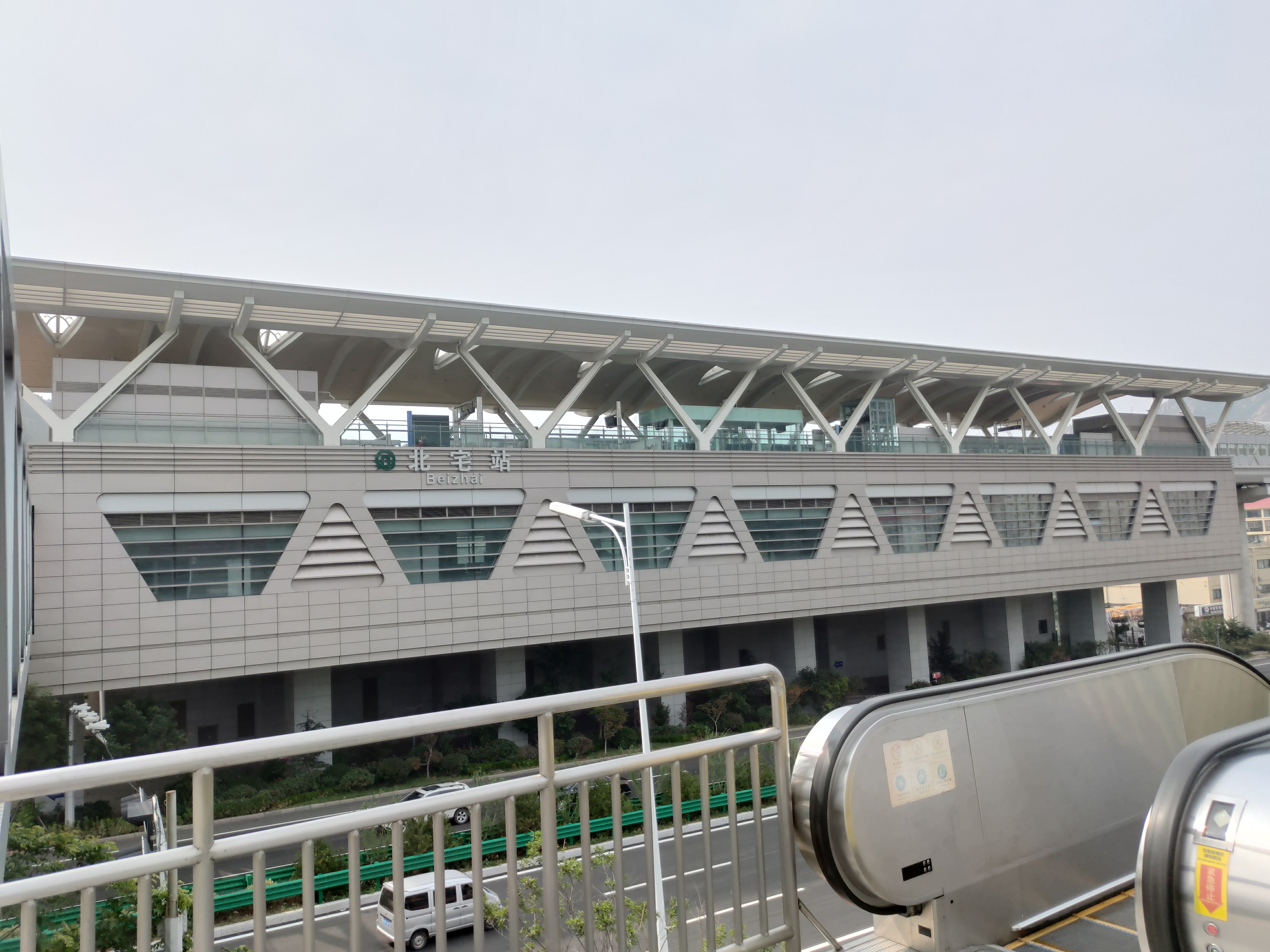
Exterior

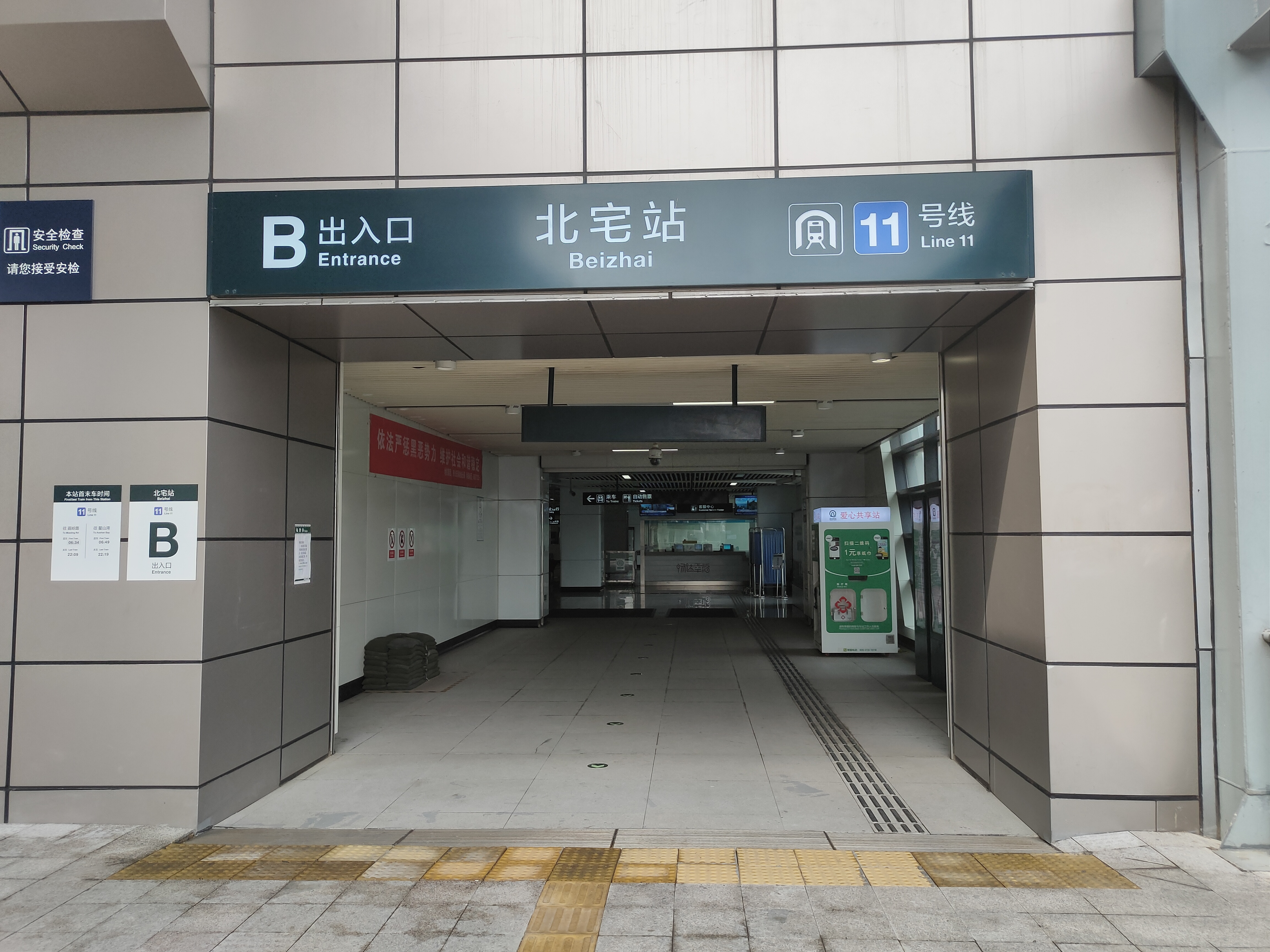
Entrance B

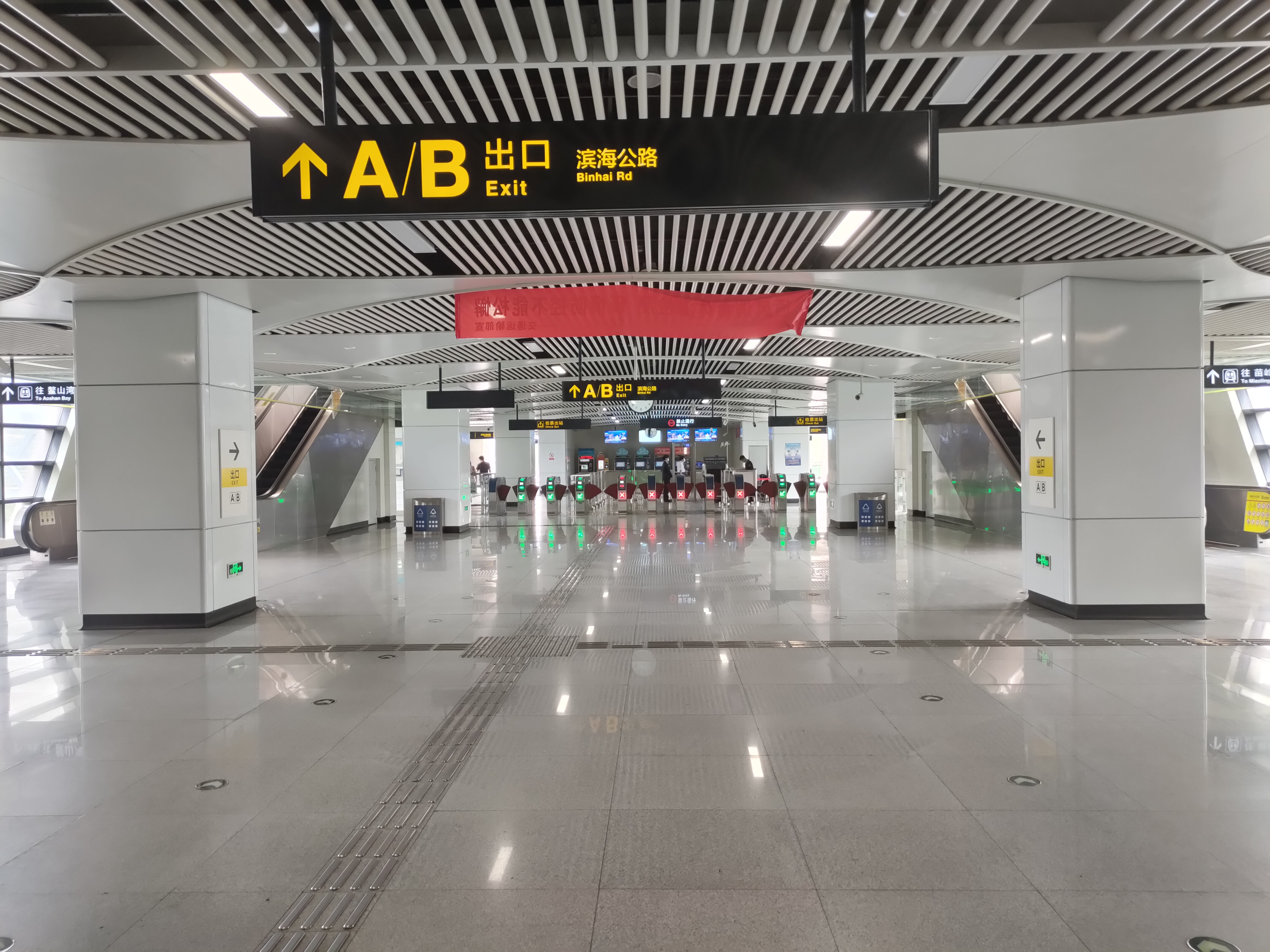
Concourse
