= International Horticultural Expo Garden station =

Qingdao Metro station

International Horticultural Expo Garden 世博园
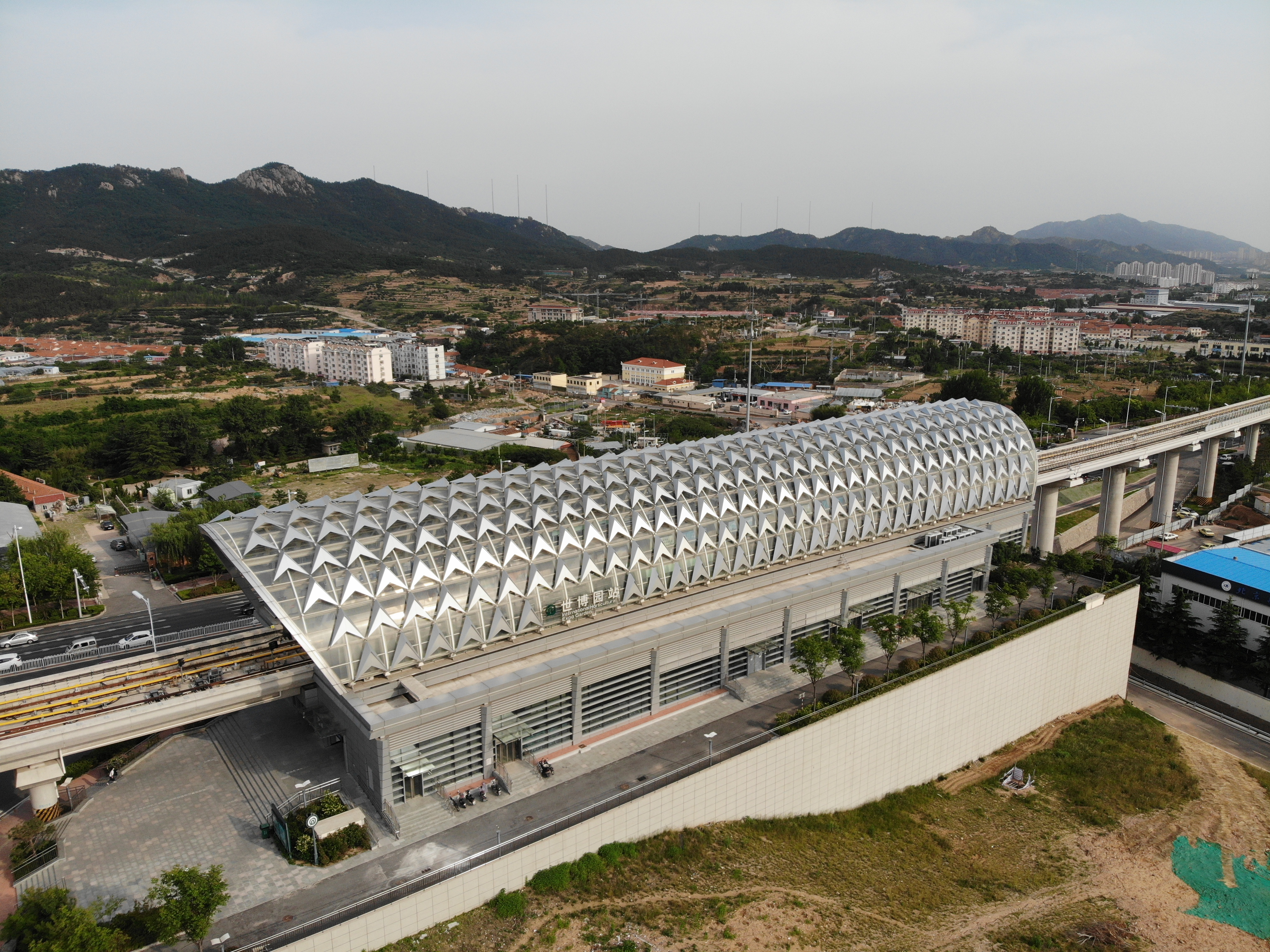

General information
- Location: Laoshan District, Qingdao, Shandong; China
- Coordinates: 36°11′07″N 120°30′24″E
- Operated by: Qingdao Metro Corporation
- Line(s): Oceantec Valley Line
- Platforms: 2 (2 side platforms)

History
- Opened: 23 April 2018; 7 years ago

Services
Preceding station	Qingdao Metro	Following station
Ocean University of China towards Miaoling Road	Oceantec Valley Line	Beizhai towards Qiangu Mountain

International Horticultural Expo Garden (Chinese: 世博园) is a station on the Oceantec Valley Line of the Qingdao Metro. It opened on 23 April 2018. It will be an interchange station with the East extension of Line 2.
