= Puli station =

Qingdao Metro station

Puli 浦里
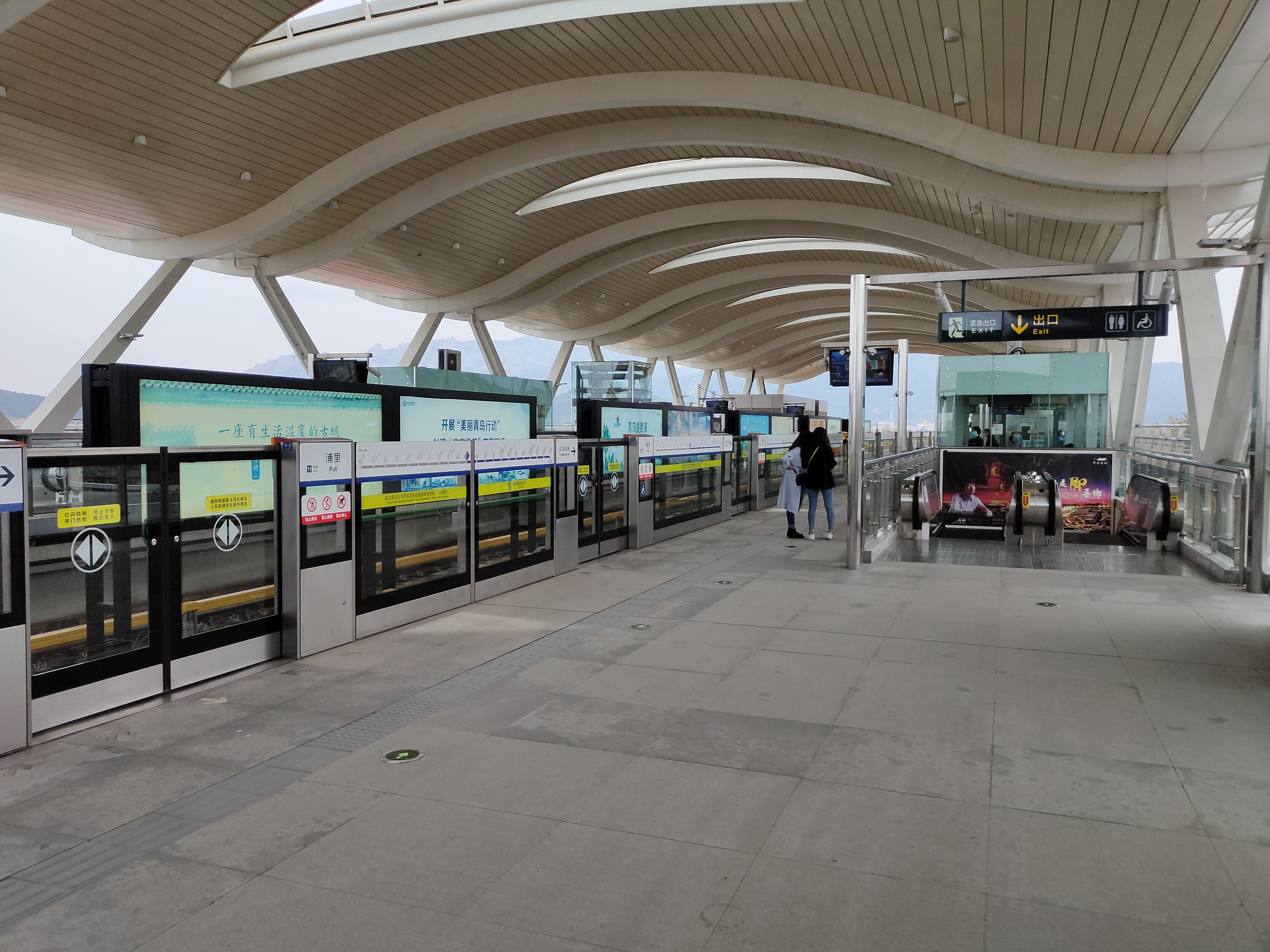

General information
- Location: Laoshan District, Qingdao, Shandong; China
- Coordinates: 36°18′22″N 120°37′25″E
- Operated by: Qingdao Metro Corporation
- Line: Oceantec Valley Line
- Platforms: 2 (2 side platforms)

History
- Opened: 23 April 2018; 8 years ago

Services
Preceding station	Qingdao Metro	Following station
Miaoshi towards Miaoling Road	Oceantec Valley Line	Aoshanwei towards Qiangu Mountain
Location

Puli (Chinese: 浦里) is a station on the Oceantec Valley Line of the Qingdao Metro. It opened on 23 April 2018.

== Gallery ==
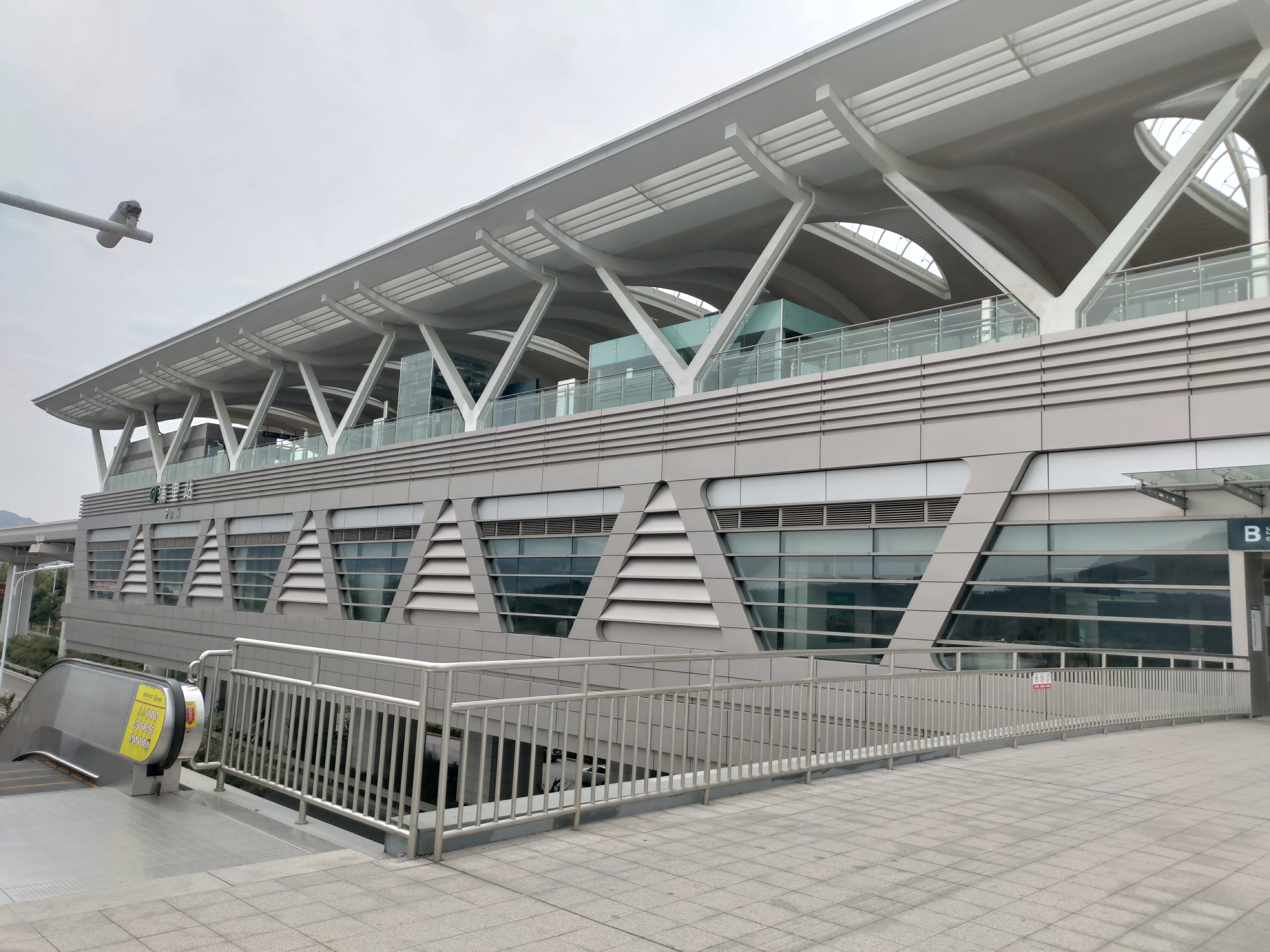
Exterior

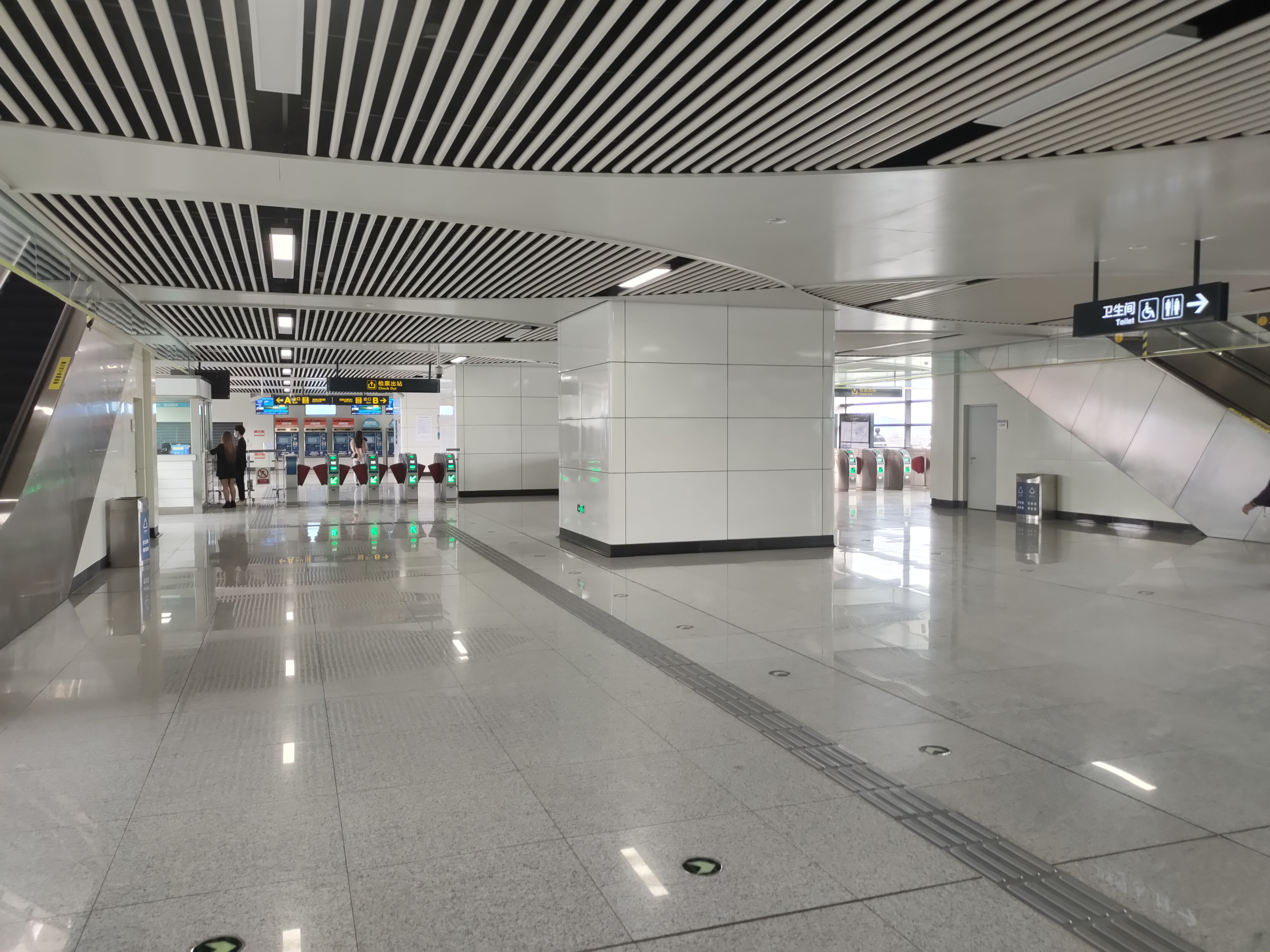
Concourse
