= Ocean University of China station =

Qingdao Metro station

Ocean University of China 海洋大学
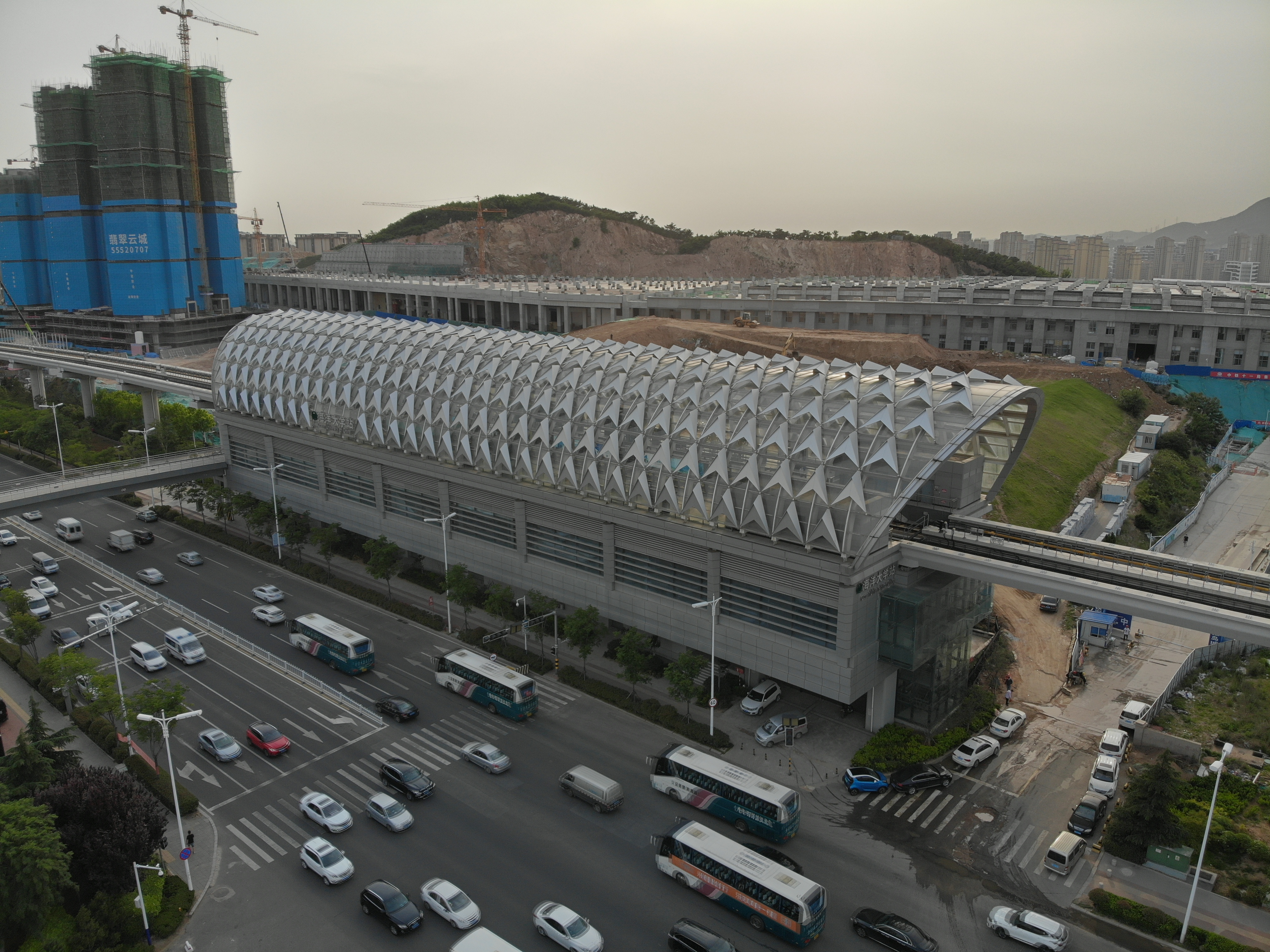

General information
- Location: Laoshan District, Qingdao, Shandong; China
- Coordinates: 36°09′54″N 120°29′24″E
- Operated by: Qingdao Metro Corporation
- Line(s): Oceantec Valley Line
- Platforms: 2 (2 side platforms)

History
- Opened: 23 April 2018; 7 years ago

Services
| Preceding station | Qingdao Metro | Following station |
|---|---|---|
| Kutao towards Miaoling Road | Oceantec Valley Line | International Horticultural Expo Garden towards Qiangu Mountain |

Ocean University of China (Chinese: 海洋大学) is a station on the Oceantec Valley Line of the Qingdao Metro. It opened on 23 April 2018 and it serves the nearby Ocean University of China.

== Gallery ==
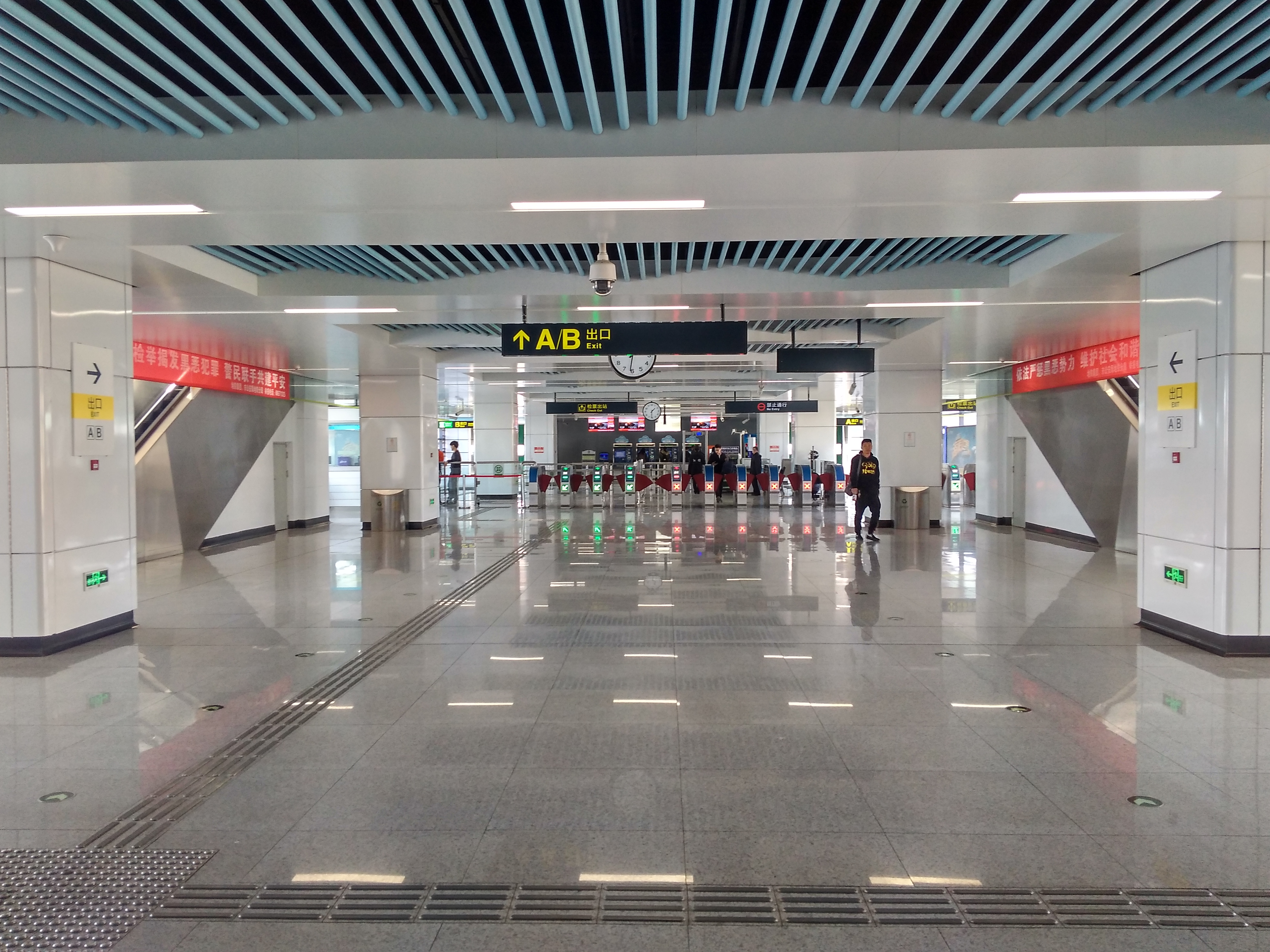
Concourse

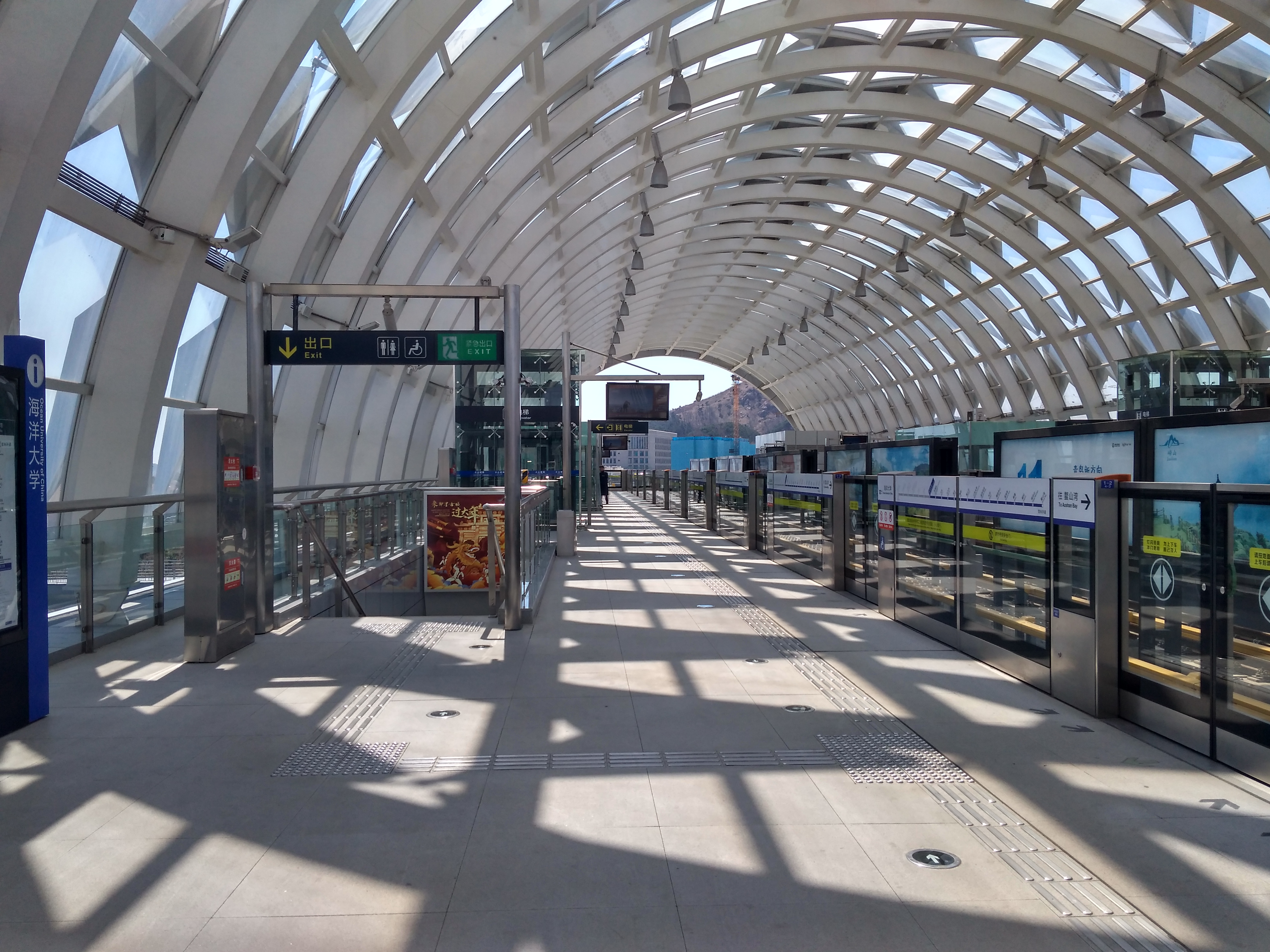
Platform
