= Convention Center station =

Convention Center station may refer to:

== United States ==
- Convention Center station (San Diego Trolley), San Diego, California
- Convention Center station (VTA), San Jose, California
- Convention Center station (RTD), Denver, Colorado
- Convention Center station (Jacksonville), former monorail station in Jacksonville, Florida
- Convention Center station (Light RailLink), Baltimore, Maryland
- Convention Center station (Detroit), a Detroit People Mover station in Michigan now known as Huntington Place station
- Convention Center station (MetroLink), St. Louis, Missouri
- Convention Center station (TriMet), on the MAX system in Portland, Oregon
- Convention Center station (DART), Dallas, Texas
- Convention Center station (GRTC), Richmond, Virginia
- Convention Center/South 15th Street station, a Link Light Rail station in Tacoma, Washington, United States
- Las Vegas Convention Center (LV Monorail station), a monorail station in Winchester, Nevada, United States

== Asia ==
- Convention Center station (Qingdao Metro), Qingdao, Shandong, China
- Convention Centre MRT station, working name for Esplanade MRT station, Singapore
- Kim Daejung Convention Center station, Gwangju, South Korea
- Queen Sirikit National Convention Centre MRT station, Bangkok, Thailand
- Shimin Hiroba Station subtitled Convention Center, Kobe, Japan
- Esplanade MRT station, Singapore, which was initially named Convention Centre MRT station during the planning stages.

== See also ==
- Convention Place station, Seattle, Washington, US
- Convention and Exhibition Center station (disambiguation)
- Convention center
