= Convention and Exhibition Center station =

Convention and Exhibition Center station may refer to the following stations:

- Convention and Exhibition Center station (Dalian Metro), on Line 1 of the Dalian Metro
- Convention and Exhibition Center station (Shenzhen Metro) on Line 1 and Line 4 of the Shenzhen Metro
- Convention and Exhibition City station on Line 20 of the Shenzhen Metro
- Huizhanzhongxin station (Tianjin Metro) on Line 9 of the Tianjin Metro
- Convention and Exhibition Center station (Zhengzhou Metro) on Line 1 (Zhengzhou Metro) and Line 4 (Zhengzhou Metro of the Zhengzhou Metro
- Exhibition And Convention Center station (Shaoxing Metro) on Line 1 of the Shaoxing Metro
- BEXCO station, a station on the Busan Metro and Korail in Busan.
- Exhibition Centre station (MTR) on East Rail line in Wan Chai.

== See also ==
- Convention Center station (disambiguation)
- Exhibition station (disambiguation)
- Exhibition Center station (disambiguation)
- Huizhanzhongxin station (disambiguation)
- Exhibition Centre on the East Rail line of the MTR, known as the HKCEC Station in its planning stage
