= Oceantec Valley Line =

Metro line in Qingdao, China

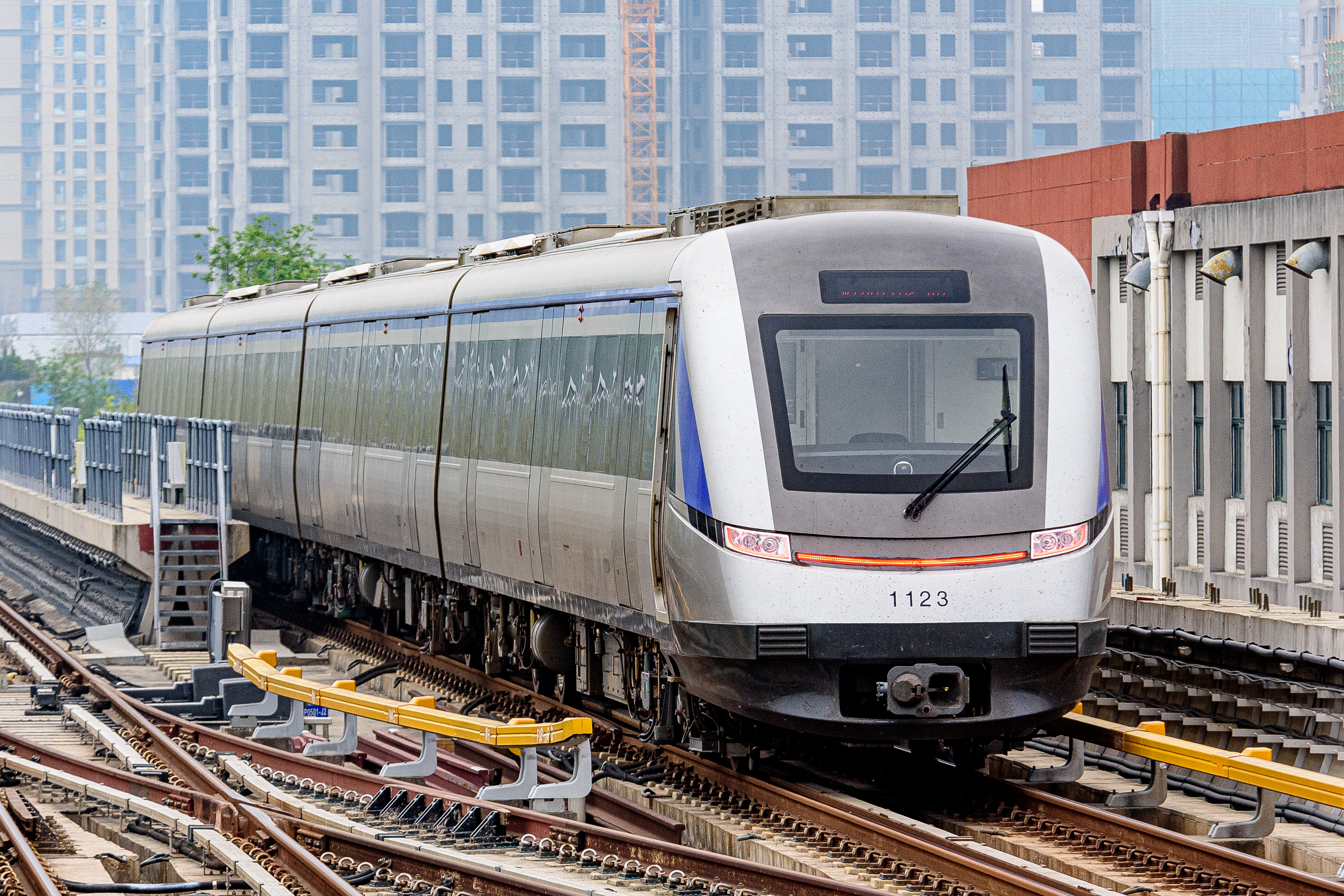
- A SFM41 train leaving Zhangcun station

Overview
- Other name(s): Line 11 (11号线); Oceantec Valley Rail Transit Express line (蓝色硅谷轨道交通快线); Line R1 (R1线); Qingdao–Haiyang intercity rail transit Phase 1 (青岛到海阳城际轨道交通一期)
- Status: In operation
- Owner: Government of Qingdao
- Locale: Qingdao, China
- Termini: Miaoling Road; Qiangu Mountain
- Stations: 21

Service
- Type: Rapid transit
- System: Qingdao Metro
- Services: 2
- Operator: Qingdao Metro Corporation
- Rolling stock: Chinese Type B1

History
- Opened: 23 April 2018; 8 years ago

Technical
- Line length: 54.371 km (33.78 mi)
- Number of tracks: 2
- Character: Underground and elevated
- Track gauge: 1,435 mm (4 ft 8 1/2 in)

The Oceantec Valley Line (蓝谷快线) of the Qingdao Metro, formerly Line 11, is a suburban metro line in Qingdao. The line runs from central Qingdao through Laoshan to the satellite district of Jimo. The line was opened on 23 April 2018.

== Opening timeline ==
Segment	Commencement	Length	Station(s)	Name
Miaoling Road — Qiangu Mountain	23 April 2018	54.371 km (33.78 mi)	21	Phase 1

== Stations ==
Station name		Connections	Distance km		Location
English	Chinese	Connections	Distance km		Location
Miaoling Road	苗岭路	2	0.000	0.000	Laoshan
Convention Center	会展中心	15	0.819	0.819	Laoshan
Qingdao No. 2 Middle School	青岛二中		1.152	1.971	Laoshan
Qingdao University of Science & Technology	青岛科大		1.648	3.619	Laoshan
Zhangcun	张村	4	1.842	5.461	Laoshan
Kutao	枯桃		0.786	6.247	Laoshan
Ocean University of China	海洋大学		2.062	8.309	Laoshan
International Horticultural Expo Garden	世博园	2	2.746	11.055	Laoshan
Beizhai	北宅		3.797	14.852	Laoshan
Beijiushui	北九水		3.558	18.410	Laoshan
Miaoshi	庙石		6.790	25.200	Laoshan
Puli	浦里	9	3.173	28.373	Laoshan
Aoshanwei	鳌山卫		5.599	33.972	Jimo
Shandong University	山东大学		2.865	36.837	Jimo
Oceantec Valley	蓝色硅谷		1.800	38.637	Jimo
Shuipo	水泊	16	2.214	40.851	Jimo
Expo Center	博览中心		3.114	43.965	Jimo
Wenquan East	温泉东		2.707	46.672	Jimo
Gaoyu	皋虞		2.906	49.578	Jimo
Zangcun	臧村		1.998	51.576	Jimo
Qiangu Mountain	钱谷山		2.795	54.371	Jimo
Aoshan Bay	鳌山湾		3.315	57.686	Jimo
Wangcun	王村				Jimo
Shagezhuang	沙戈庄				Jimo
Tianheng West	田横西				Jimo
Tianheng	田横				Jimo

== Future Development ==
A further extension to Tianheng station (田横站) in Tianheng Resort (田横旅游度假区) is under planning.Aoshanbay station is going to be an interchange with line 21 in 2060.The rest of the line is planned to open in 2050.Aoshanbay station will remain closed until 2046 OR 2049.
