= Exhibition Centre station =

Exhibition Center station may refer to:

- Exhibition Center station (Dongguan Rail Transit), a station on the Dongguan Rail Transit in Dongguan, Guangdong, China.
- Exhibition Center station (Fuzhou Metro), a station on Line 4 of Fuzhou Metro, currently under construction, in Fuzhou, Fujian, China.
- Exhibition Centre station (MTR), a station on the East Rail line of MTR in Hong Kong.
- Exhibition Centre railway station, a ScotRail station in Glasgow, Scotland.
- Taipei Nangang Exhibition Center Station, a station on Bannan and Wenhu Line in Taipei, Taiwan
- Kaohsiung Exhibition Center light rail station, a station on Circular Light Rail in Kaohsiung, Taiwan
- Agricultural Exhibition Center station, a station on the Beijing Subway in Beijing.
- China International Exhibition Center station, a station on the Beijing Subway in Beijing.

== See also ==
- Exhibition station (disambiguation)
- Convention and Exhibition Center station (disambiguation)
