= Convention Center station (Qingdao Metro) =

Qingdao Metro station

Coordinates: 36.1027°N 120.4693°E

Convention Center 会展中心
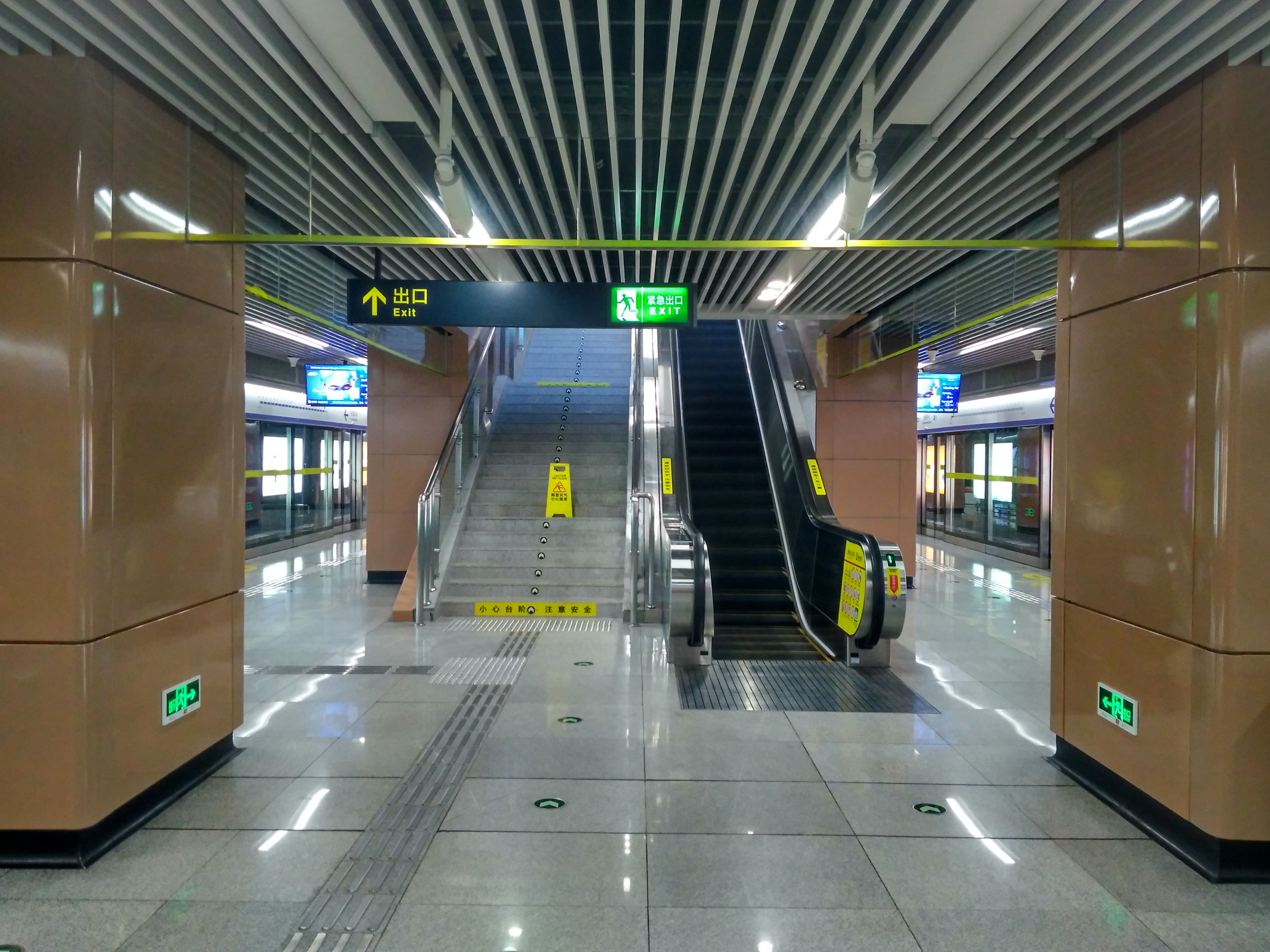

General information
- Location: Laoshan District, Qingdao, Shandong; China
- Operated by: Qingdao Metro Corporation
- Line(s): Oceantec Valley Line
- Platforms: 2 (1 island platform)

History
- Opened: 23 April 2018; 7 years ago

Services
| Preceding station | Qingdao Metro | Following station |
|---|---|---|
| Miaoling Road Terminus | Oceantec Valley Line | Qingdao No. 2 Middle School towards Qiangu Mountain |

Convention Center (Chinese: 会展中心) is a station on the Oceantec Valley Line of the Qingdao Metro. It opened on 23 April 2018. It will be an interchange station with Line 15 which is already approved.

== Gallery ==
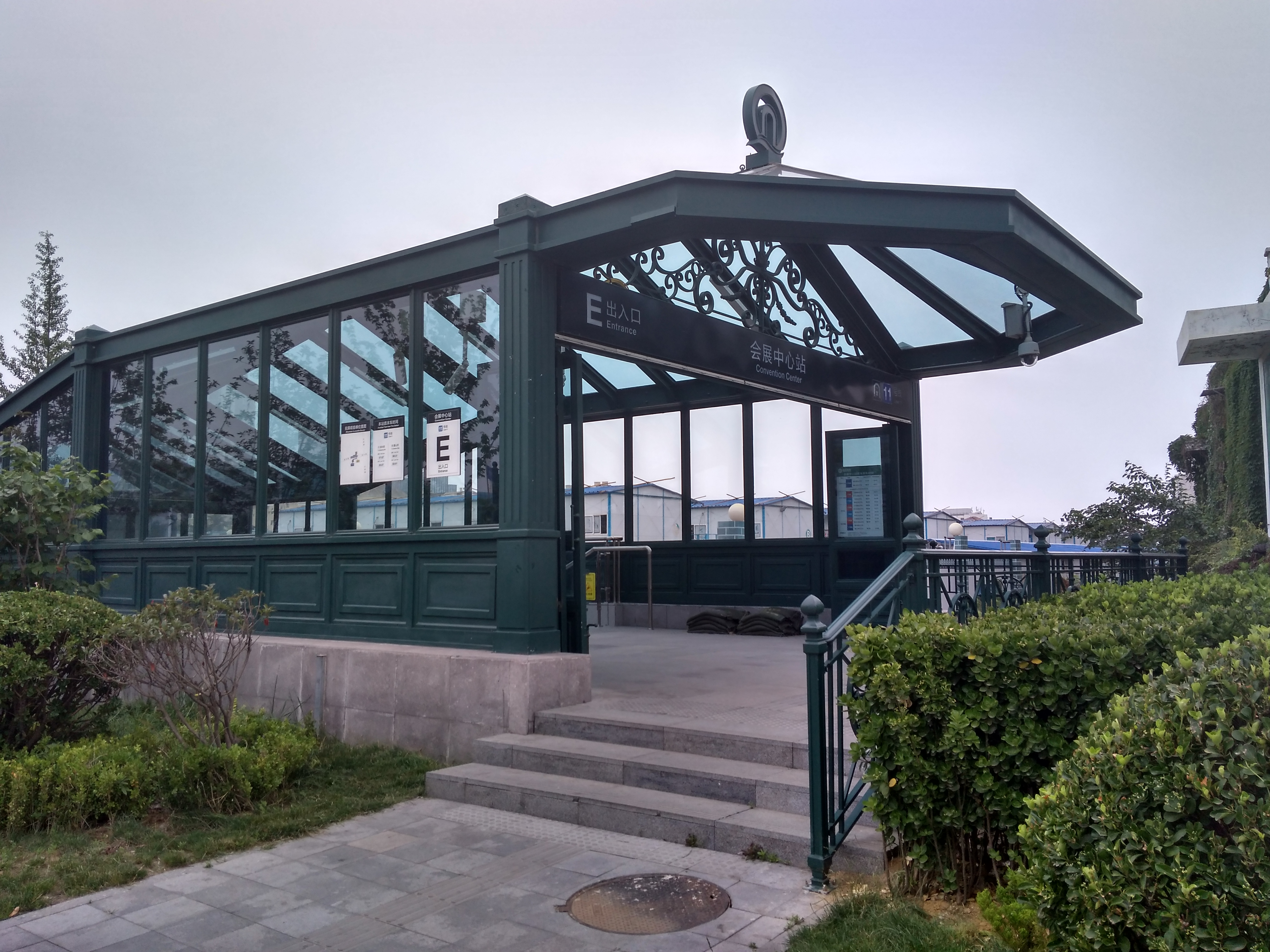
Entrance E

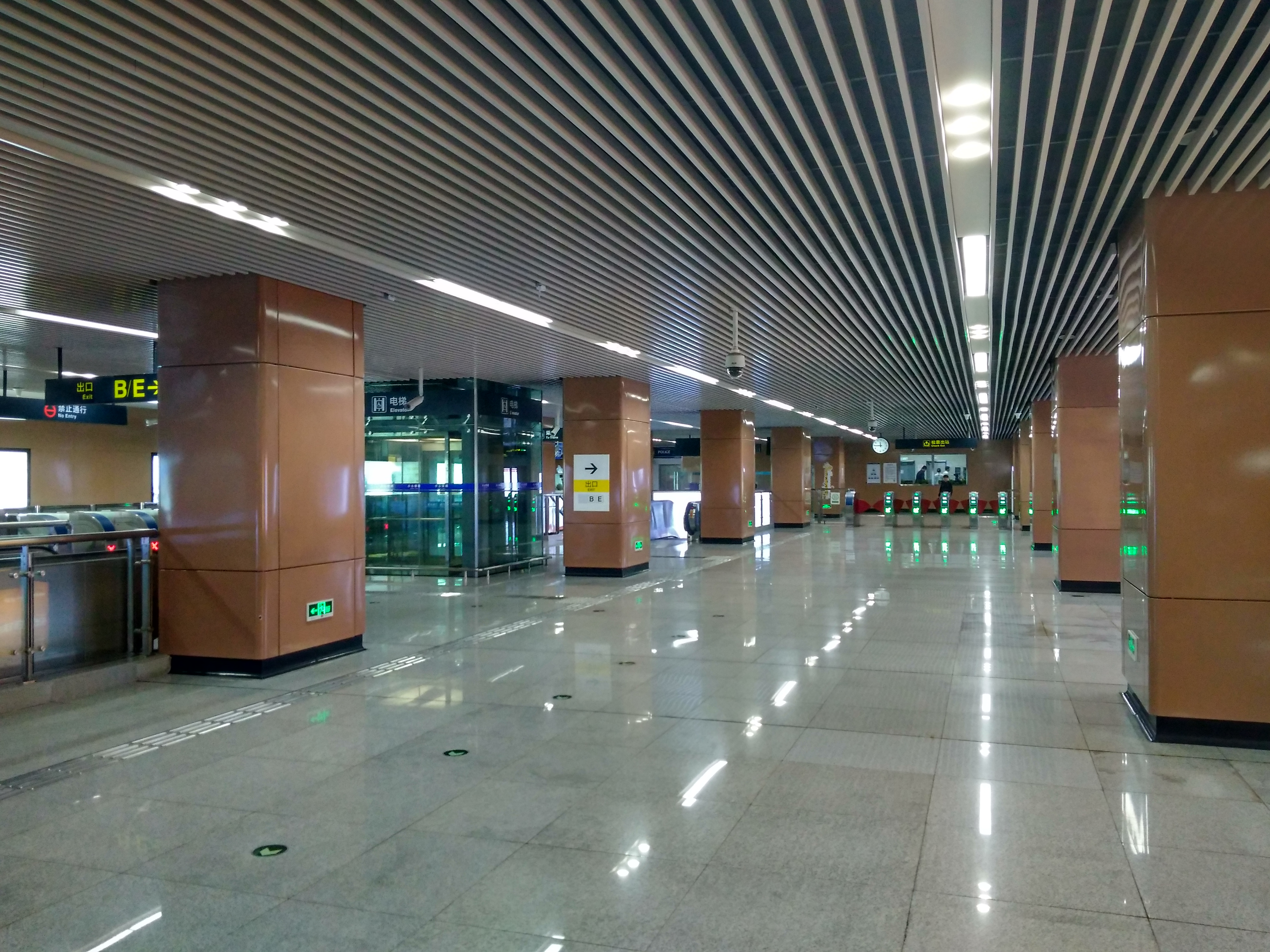
Concourse
