= Exhibition station =

Exhibition station may refer to:

- Exhibition railway station, Brisbane, Australia
- Exhibition GO Station in Toronto, Canada
- Wembley Exhibition railway station in London, England (1923–1969)

== See also ==
- Exhibition Centre station (disambiguation)
- Convention and Exhibition Center station (disambiguation)
