= Miaoling Road station =

Metro station in Qingdao, China

Miaoling Road 苗岭路
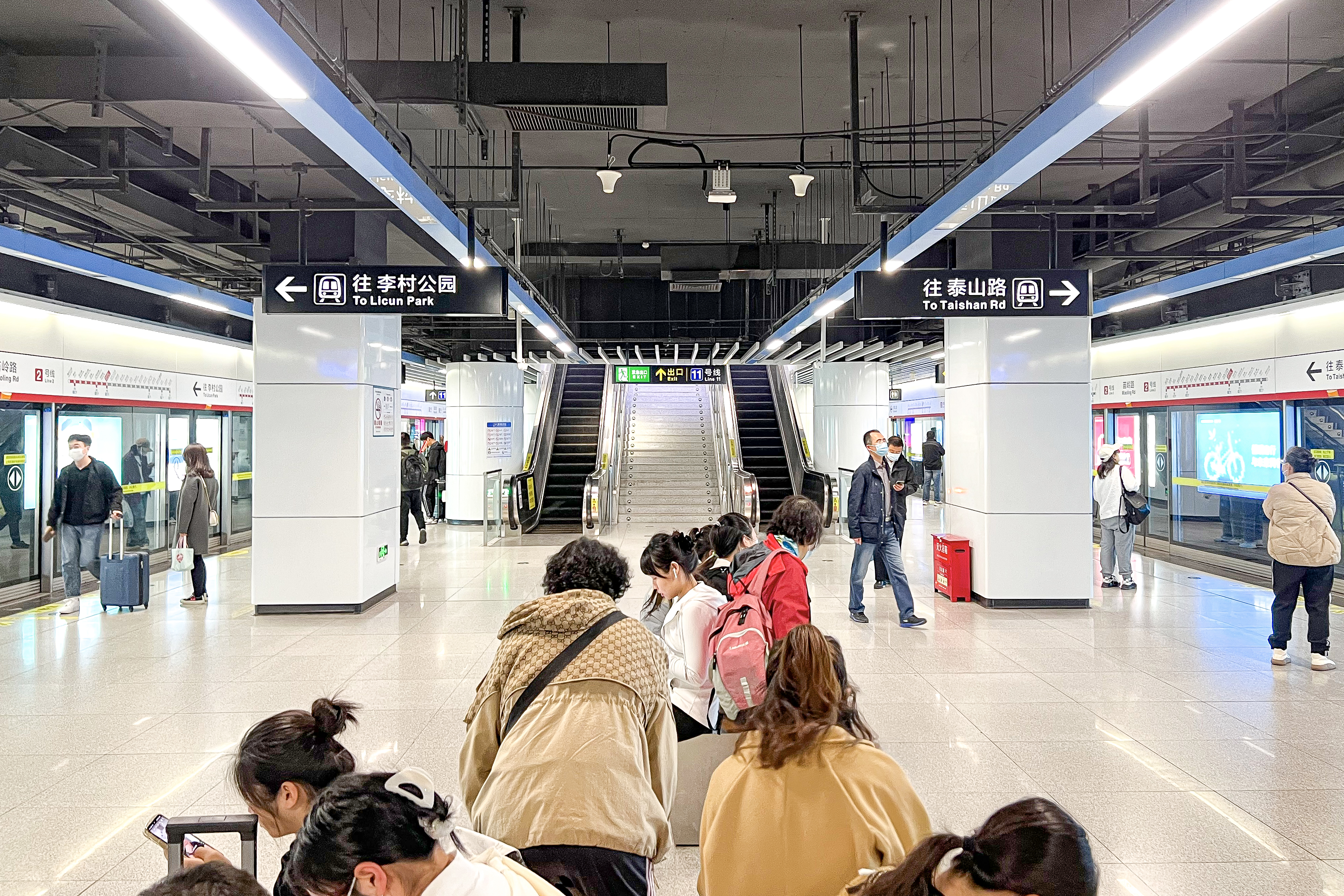
- Line 2 platform

General information
- Location: Laoshan District, Qingdao, Shandong; China
- Operator: Qingdao Metro Corporation
- Lines: Line 2 Oceantec Valley Line
- Platforms: 4 (1 island platform, 2 side platforms)

History
- Opened: 10 December 2017; 8 years ago

Services
| Preceding station | Qingdao Metro | Following station |
|---|---|---|
| Shilaoren Beach towards Sichuan Road (Qingdao Ferry Terminal) | Line 2 | Tong'an Road towards Licun Park |
| Terminus | Oceantec Valley Line | Convention Center towards Qiangu Mountain |
Location

Miaoling Road (Chinese: 苗岭路) is a transfer station on Line 2 and the Oceantec Valley Line of the Qingdao Metro. It opened on 10 December 2017.

== Gallery ==
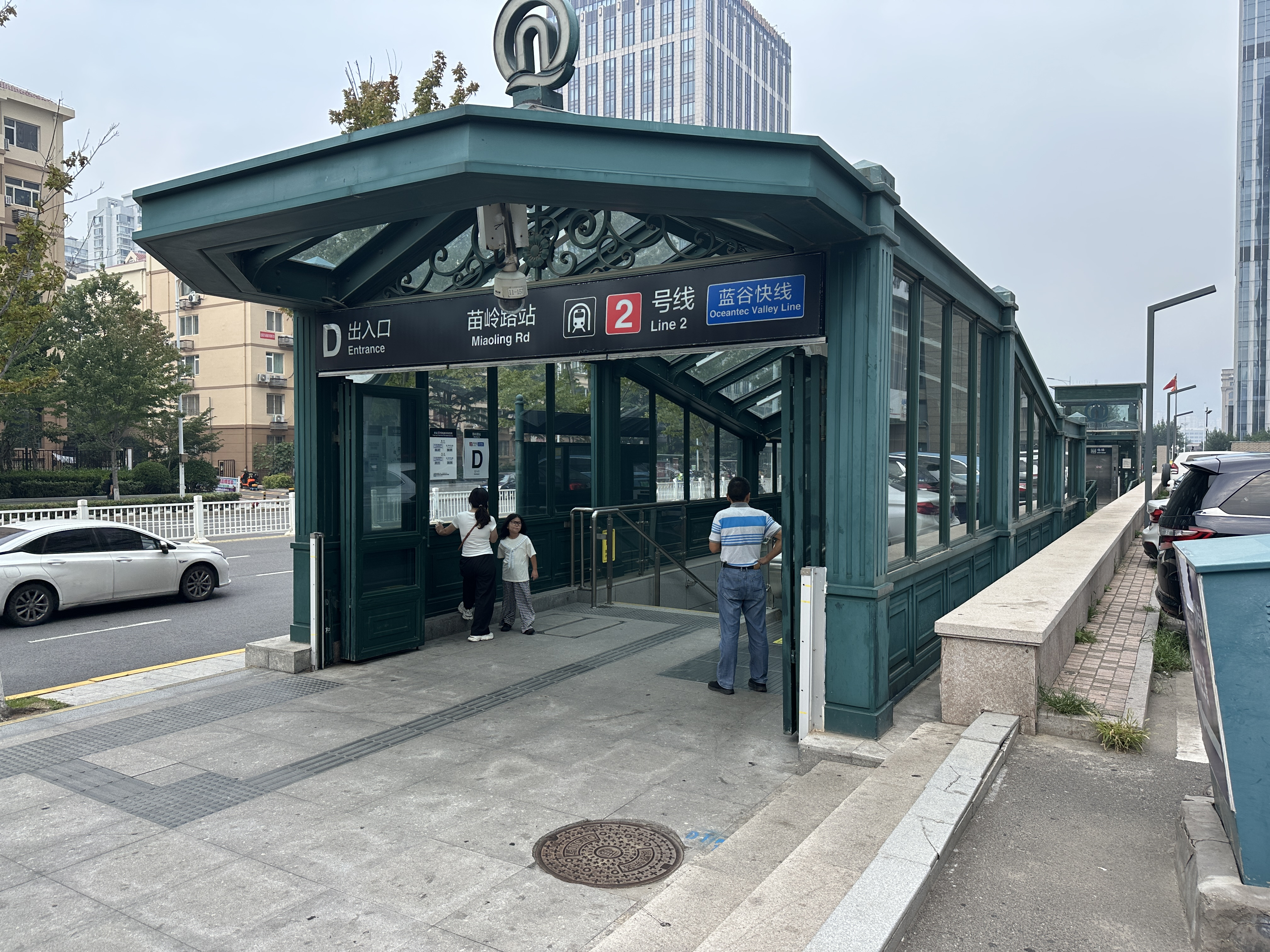
Entrance D

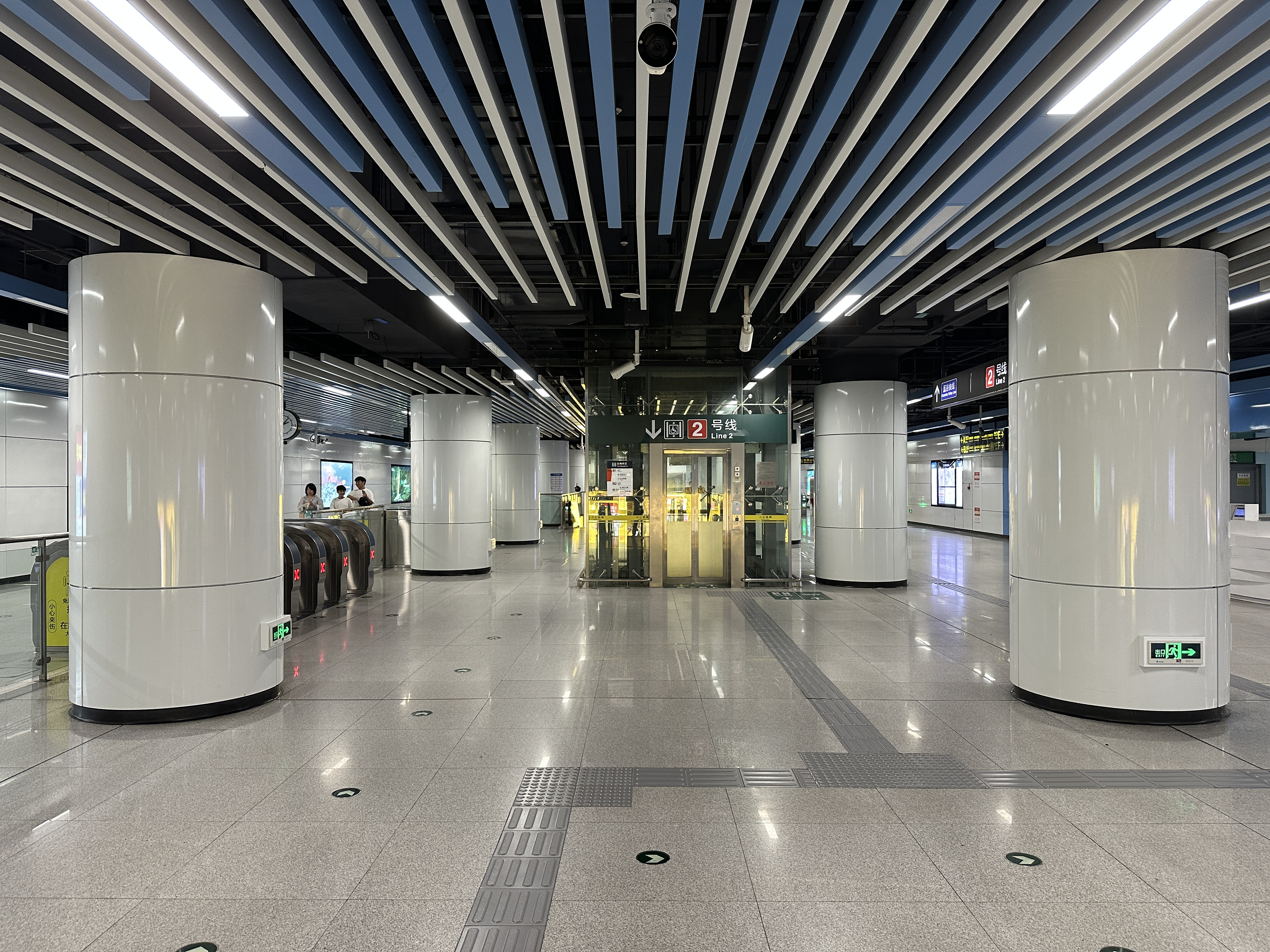
Line 2 Concourse

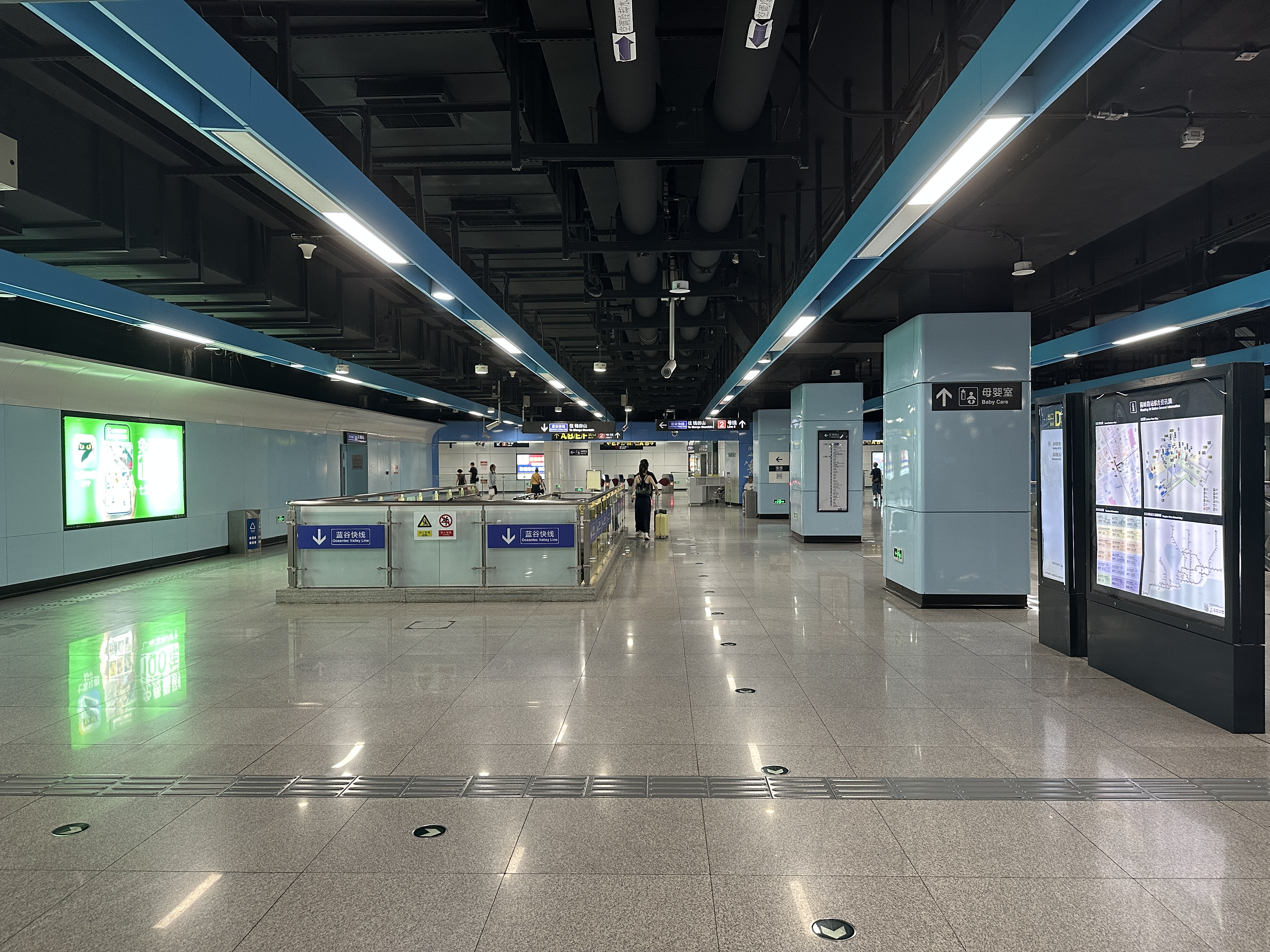
Line 11 Concourse

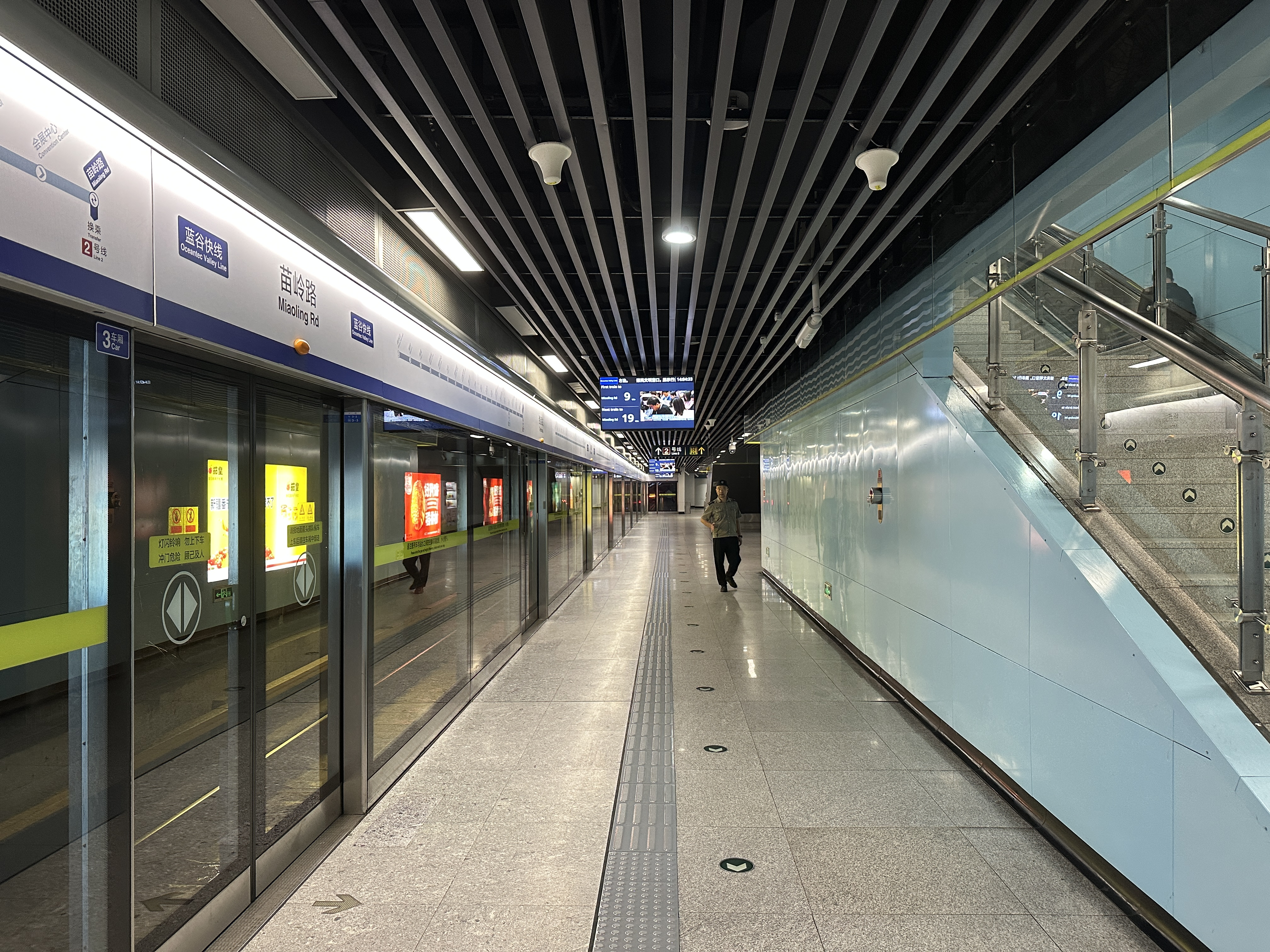
Line 11 platform
