= Taidong station =

Qingdao Metro station

Taidong 台东
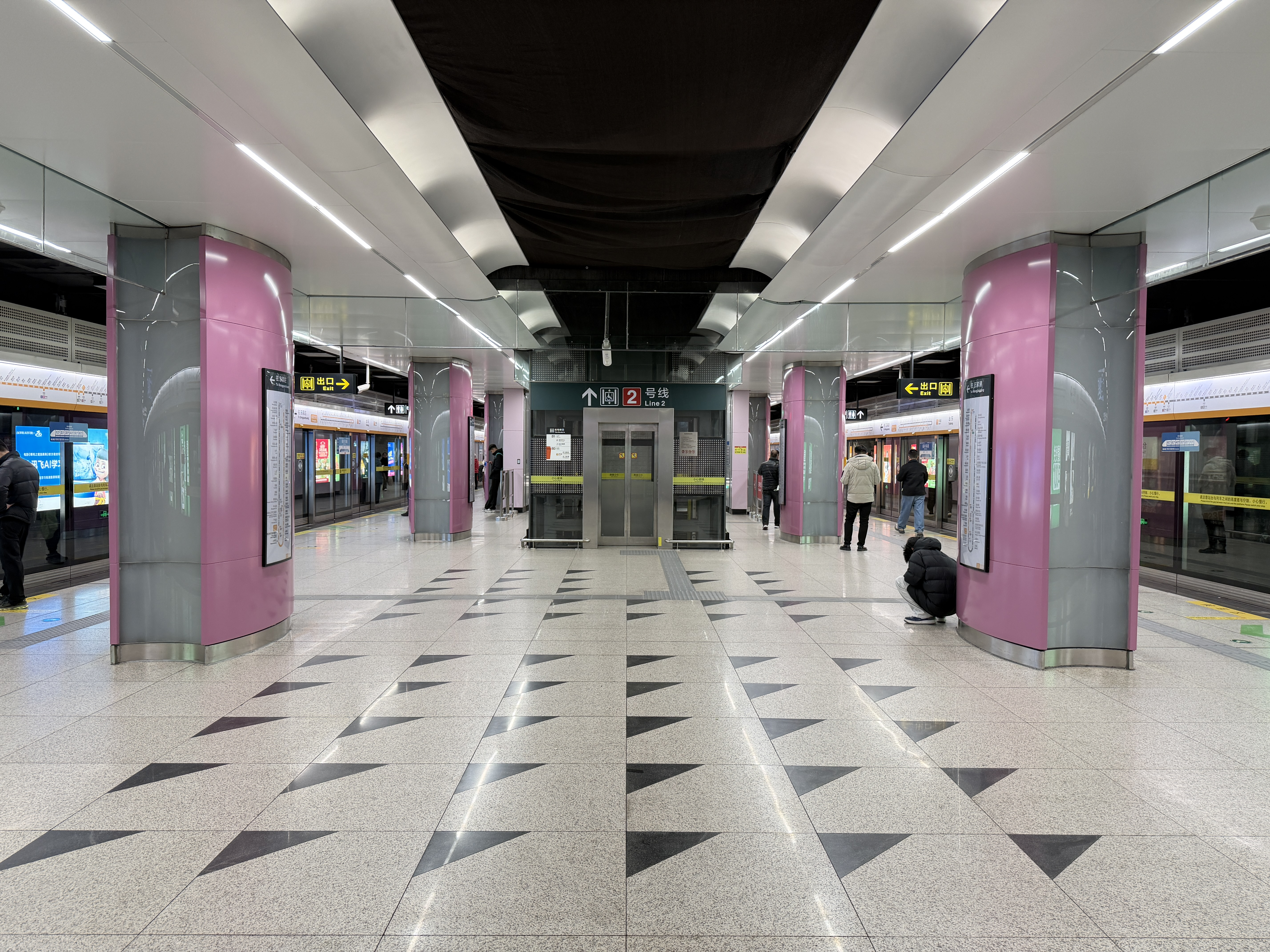
- Line 1 platform

General information
- Location: Shibei District, Qingdao, Shandong; China
- Coordinates: 36.0820°N 120.3490°E
- Operator: Qingdao Metro Corporation
- Lines: Line 1 Line 2
- Platforms: 4 (2 island platforms)

History
- Opened: 16 December 2019; 6 years ago

Services
Preceding station	Qingdao Metro	Following station
Guangrao Road towards Wangjiagang	Line 1	Haipo Bridge (Hiser Hospital) towards Dongguozhuang
Lijin Road towards Sichuan Road (Qingdao Ferry Terminal)	Line 2	Haixin Bridge towards Licun Park
Location

Taidong (Chinese: 台东) is a station on Line 1 and Line 2 of the Qingdao Metro. It opened on 16 December 2019.

== Gallery ==
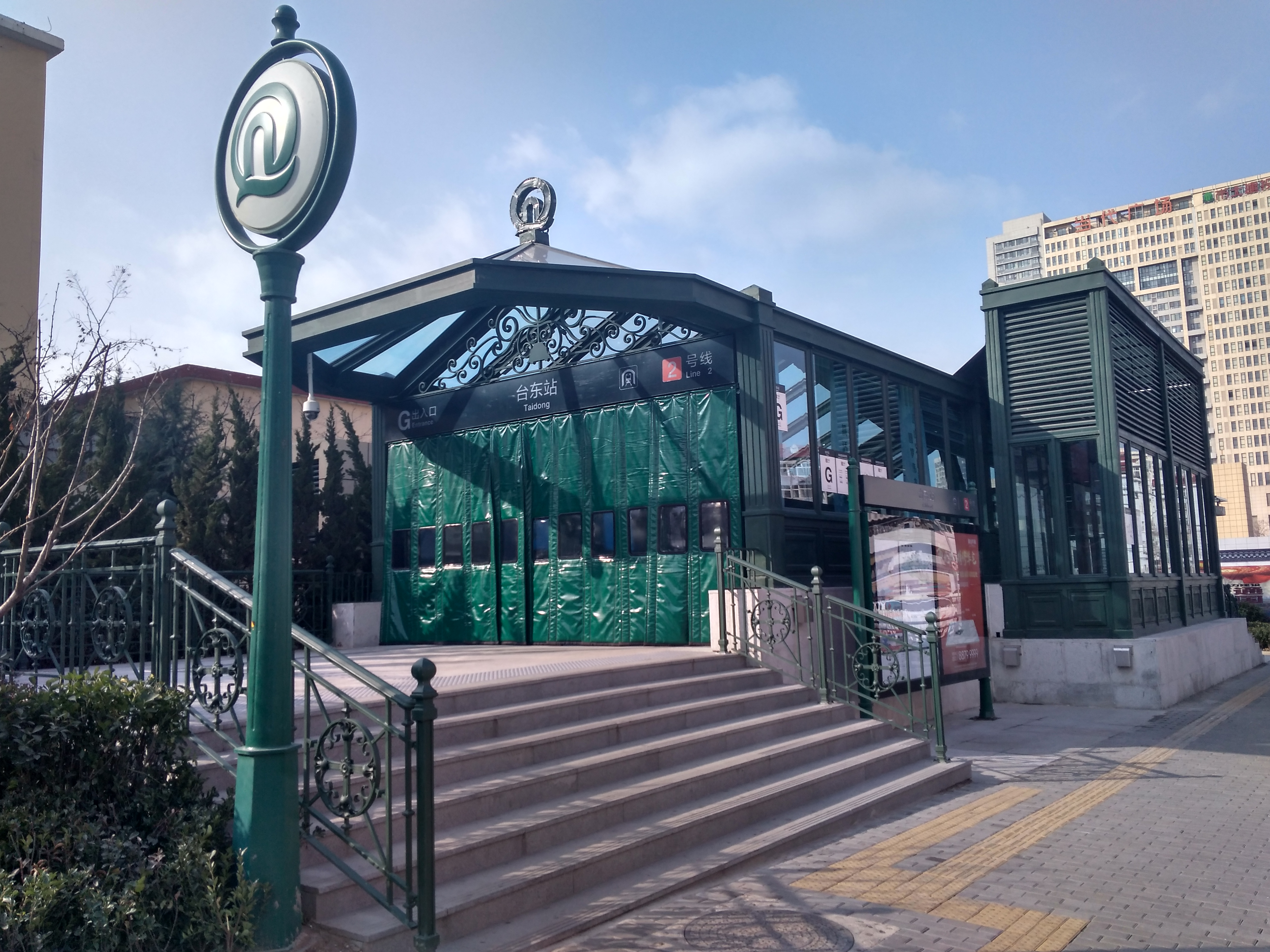
Entrance G

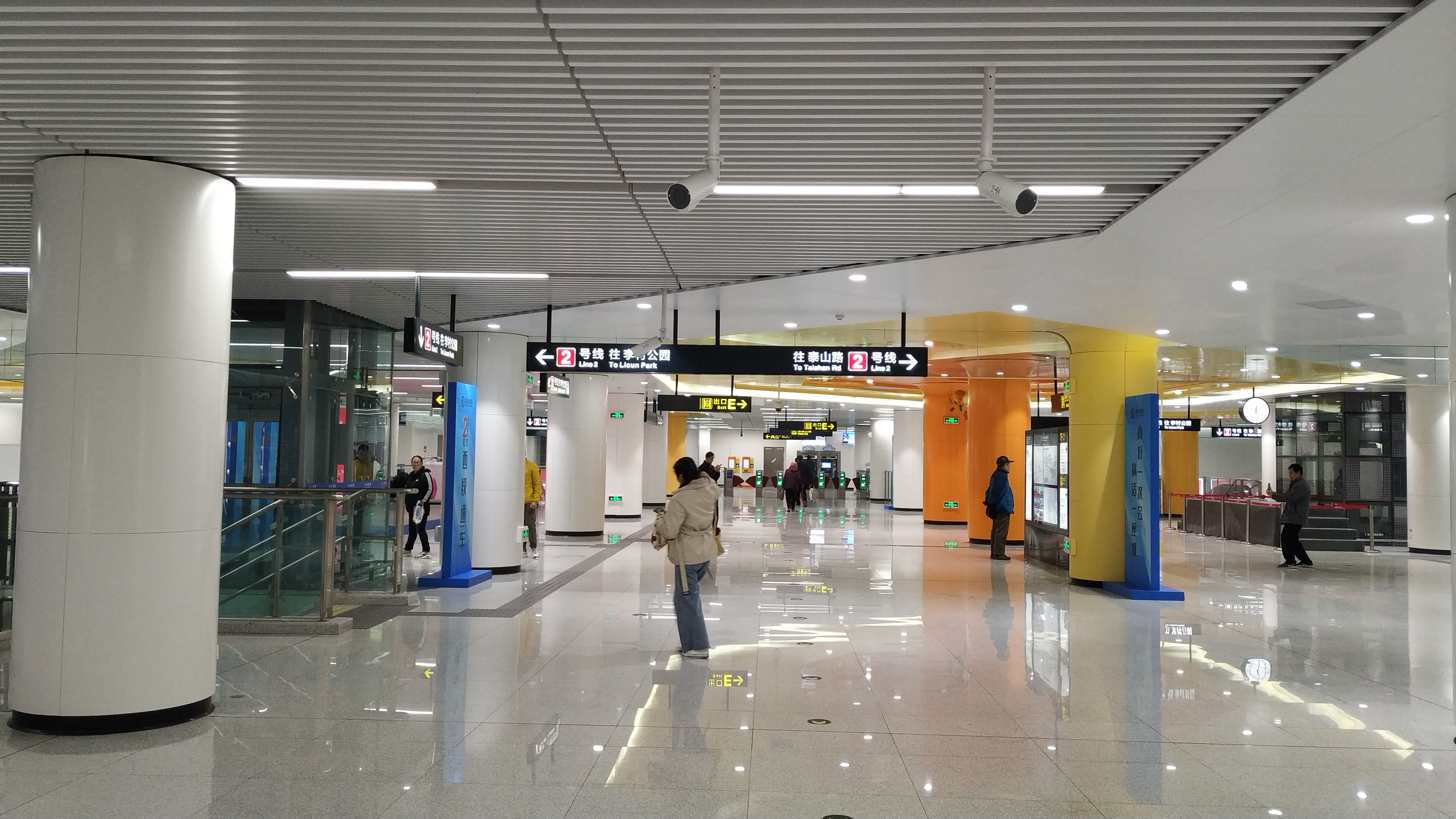
Concourse

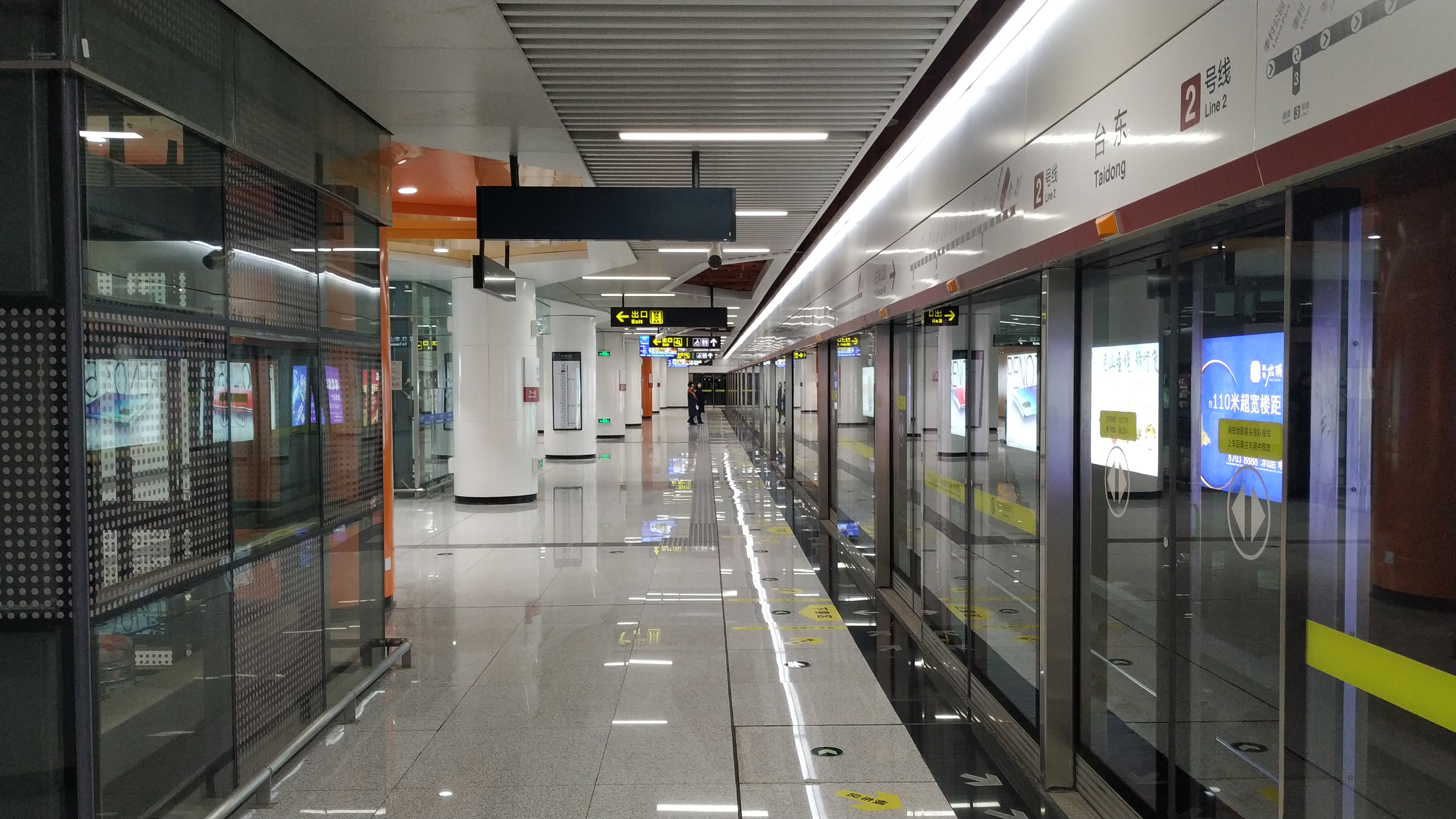
Line 2 platform
