= Line 1 (Qingdao Metro) =

Metro line in Qingdao, China

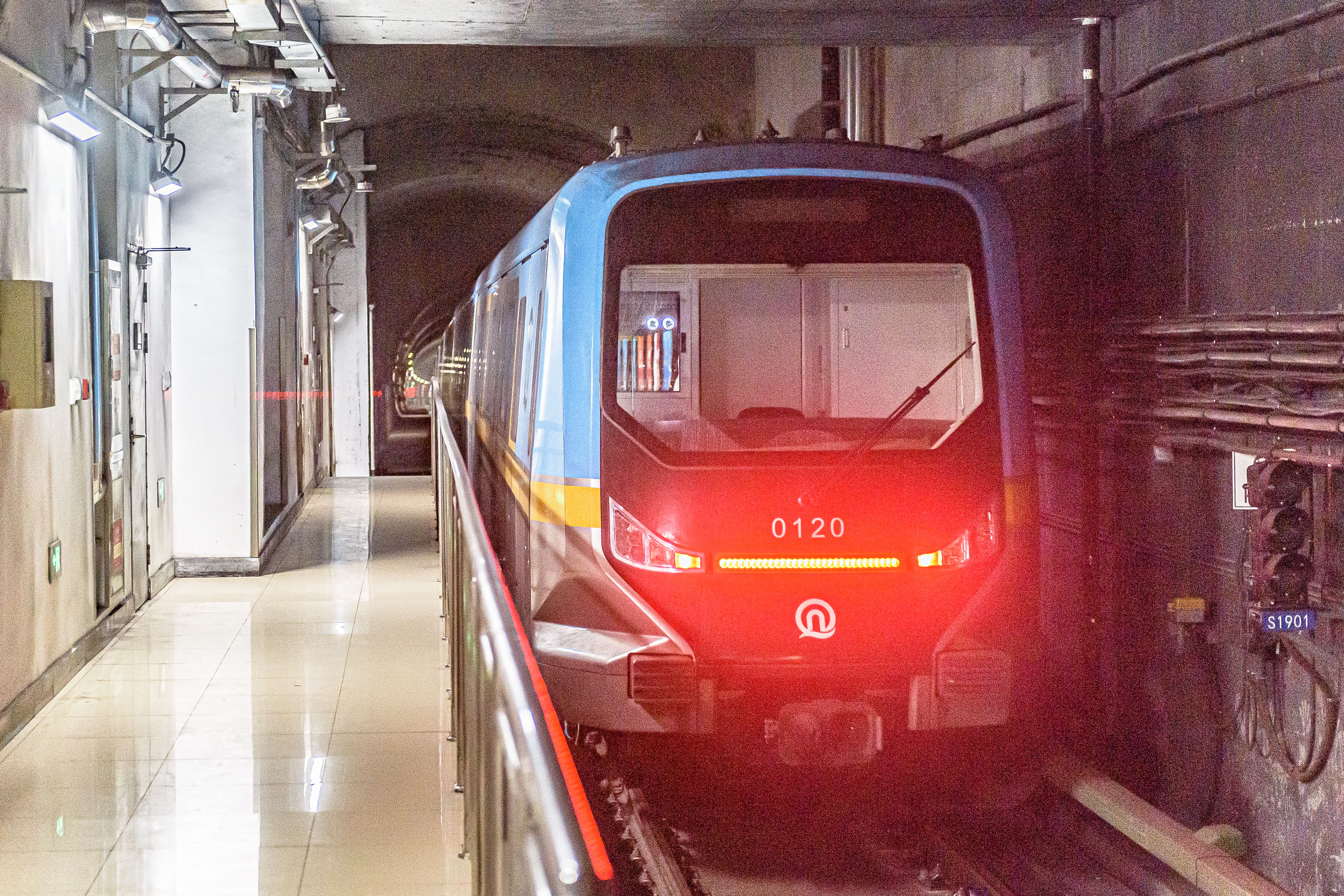
- A Line 1 train leaving Taidong station

Overview
- Status: In operation
- Owner: Government of Qingdao
- Locale: Qingdao, Shandong Province, China
- Termini: Wangjiagang; Dongguozhuang
- Stations: 41

Service
- Type: Rapid transit
- System: Qingdao Metro
- Services: 1
- Operator(s): Qingdao Metro Corporation
- Rolling stock: Chinese Type B1

History
- Opened: 24 December 2020; 4 years ago

Technical
- Line length: 59.818 km (37.17 mi)
- Number of tracks: 2
- Character: Underground
- Track gauge: 1,435 mm (4 ft 8 1/2 in)

Line 1 of Qingdao Metro (Chinese: 青岛地铁1号线) is an underground metro line in Qingdao. It crosses Jiaozhou Bay between Fenghuangdao and Tuandao stations by a cross-sea tunnel parallels with the road tunnel.

== History ==
The northern section was opened on 24 December 2020 with 15 stations from Qingdao North Railway Station to Dongguozhuang. Note that section between Xingguo Road and Dongguozhuang is planned to split from line 1 to be the Phase 1 section of line 7 in the future.

The southern section from Wangjiagang to Qingdao North Railway Station opened on December 30, 2021. Xizhen station on the section is not opened.

== Opening timeline ==
Segment	Commencement	Length	Station(s)	Name
Qingdao North Railway Station — Dongguozhuang	24 December 2020	21.182 km (13.16 mi)	15	Phase 1 (Northern section)
Wangjiagang — Qingdao North Railway Station	30 December 2021	38.636 km (24.01 mi)	26	Phase 1 (Southern section)
Xizhen	25 July 2023	-	1	Infill station

== Stations ==
Station name		Connections	Distance km		Location
English	Chinese	Connections	Distance km		Location
Wangjiagang	王家港	6	0.400	0.400	Huangdao
China University of Petroleum	石油大学		0.983	1.383	Huangdao
Taihangshan Road	太行山路		0.875	2.258	Huangdao
Jinggangshan Road	井冈山路	West Coast	0.813	3.071	Huangdao
Dingjiahe	丁家河		1.334	4.405	Huangdao
Xuejiadao	薛家岛		1.667	6.072	Huangdao
Tianmushan Road	天目山路	12	0.903	6.975	Huangdao
Anzi	安子		0.942	7.917	Huangdao
Xingangshan Road	新港山路		1.092	9.009	Huangdao
Nanbeitun	南北屯		1.986	10.995	Huangdao
Shanli	山里		2.461	13.456	Huangdao
Fenghuangdao	凤凰岛		1.622	15.078	Huangdao
Tuandao	团岛		6.729	21.807	Shinan
Xizhen	西镇		0.700	22.507	Shinan
Qingdao Railway Station	青岛站	3 QDK	0.859	23.366	Shinan
Zhongshan Road	中山路		1.208	24.574	Shibei
Guanxiangshan (Qingdao Municipal Hospital)	观象山（市立医院）	4	0.728	25.302	Shibei / Shinan
Guangrao Road	广饶路		1.214	26.516	Shibei
Taidong	台东	2	1.311	27.827	Shibei
Haipo Bridge (Hiser Hospital)	海泊桥（海慈医疗）	4	1.565	29.392	Shibei
Xiaocunzhuang	小村庄		1.225	30.617	Shibei
Beiling	北岭		1.279	31.896	Shibei
Shuiqinggou	水清沟		1.538	33.434	Shibei
Qingdao Central Hospital	中心医院		1.563	34.997	Shibei
Shengli Bridge (Textile Valley)	胜利桥（纺织谷）	5	0.989	35.986	Shibei
Anshun Road	安顺路		1.521	37.507	Licang
Qingdao North Railway Station	青岛北站	3 8 QR QHK	1.129	38.636	Licang
Cang'an Road	沧安路		1.444	40.080	Licang
Yongnian Road	永年路		1.243	41.323	Licang
Xingguo Road	兴国路	7 (Note: The section from Xingguo Road to Dongguozhuang is planned to be split into Line 7 once Line 7 is completed)	1.415	42.738	Licang
Nanling	南岭		1.161	43.899	Licang
Zunyi Road	遵义路		1.465	45.364	Licang
Ruijin Road	瑞金路		1.461	46.825	Licang
Xianjiazhai (North Coach Station)	仙家寨（汽车北站）		1.383	48.208	Chengyang
Liuting	流亭	10	3.242	51.450	Chengyang
Fenggang Road	凤岗路		1.962	53.412	Chengyang
Xiaozhaizi	小寨子		1.279	54.691	Chengyang
Zhengyang Middle Road	正阳中路	9	1.068	55.759	Chengyang
Qingdao Agricultural University	农业大学	Qingdao Chengyang Tram	1.083	56.842	Chengyang
Goucha	沟岔	15	1.613	58.455	Chengyang
Dongguozhuang	东郭庄		1.363	59.818	Chengyang
