= Lijin Road station =

Qingdao Metro station

Lijin Road 利津路
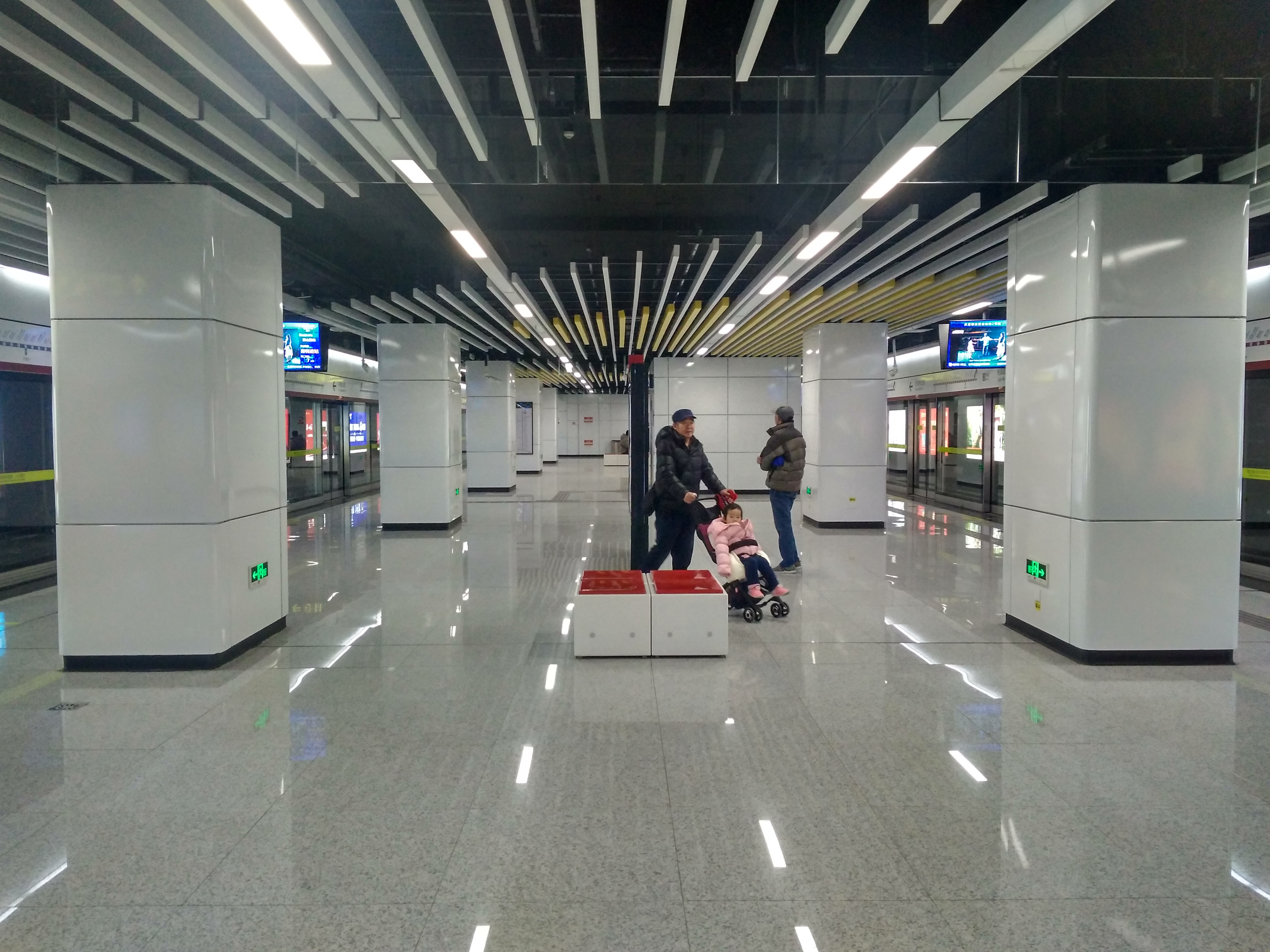

General information
- Location: Shibei District, Qingdao, Shandong; China
- Operated by: Qingdao Metro Corporation
- Line: Line 2
- Platforms: 2 (1 island platform)

History
- Opened: 16 December 2019; 6 years ago

Services
Preceding station	Qingdao Metro	Following station
Taishan Road Terminus	Line 2	Taidong towards Licun Park
Location

Lijin Road (Chinese: 利津路) is a station on Line 2 of the Qingdao Metro. It opened on 16 December 2019.

== Gallery ==
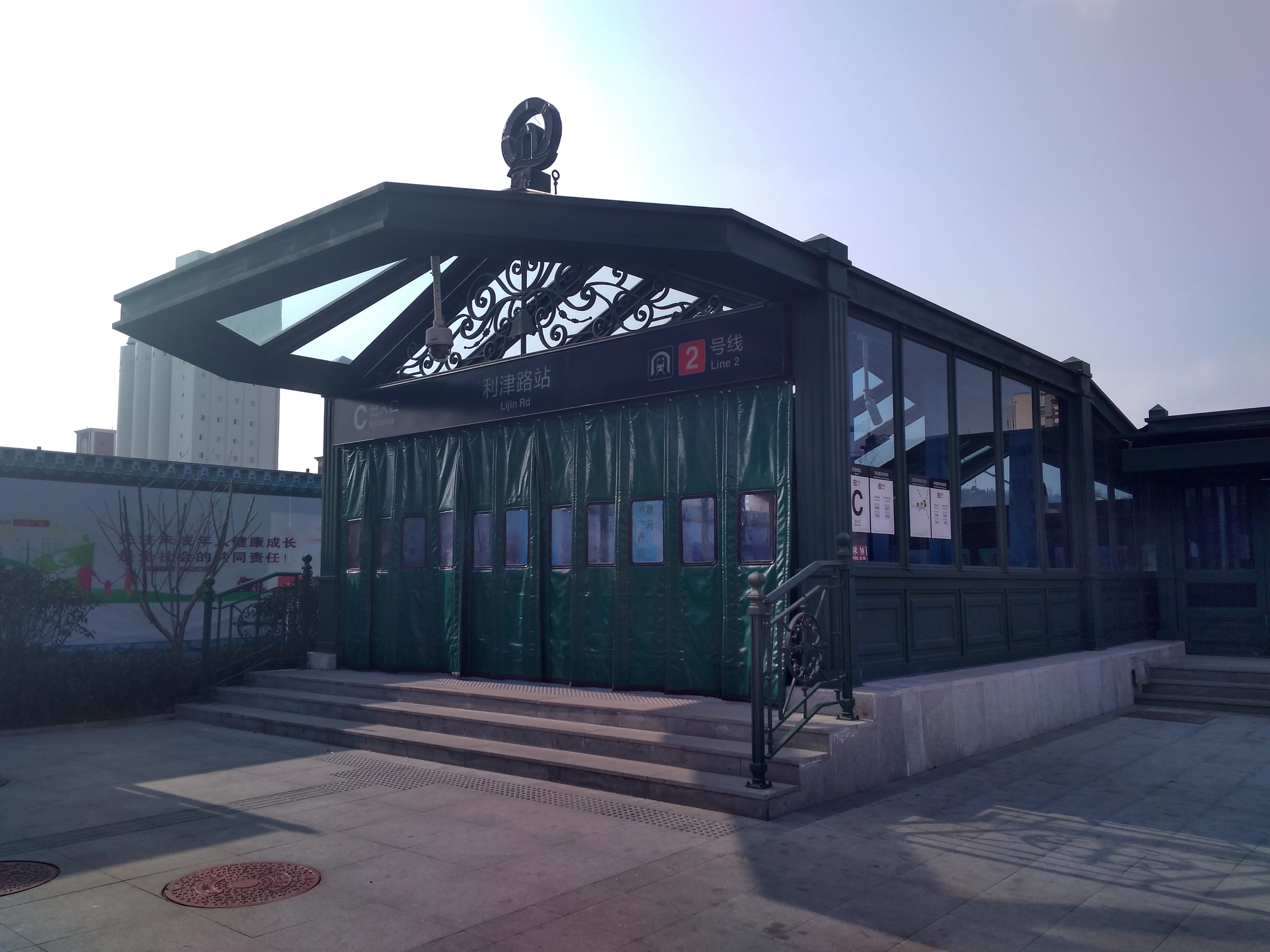
Entrance C

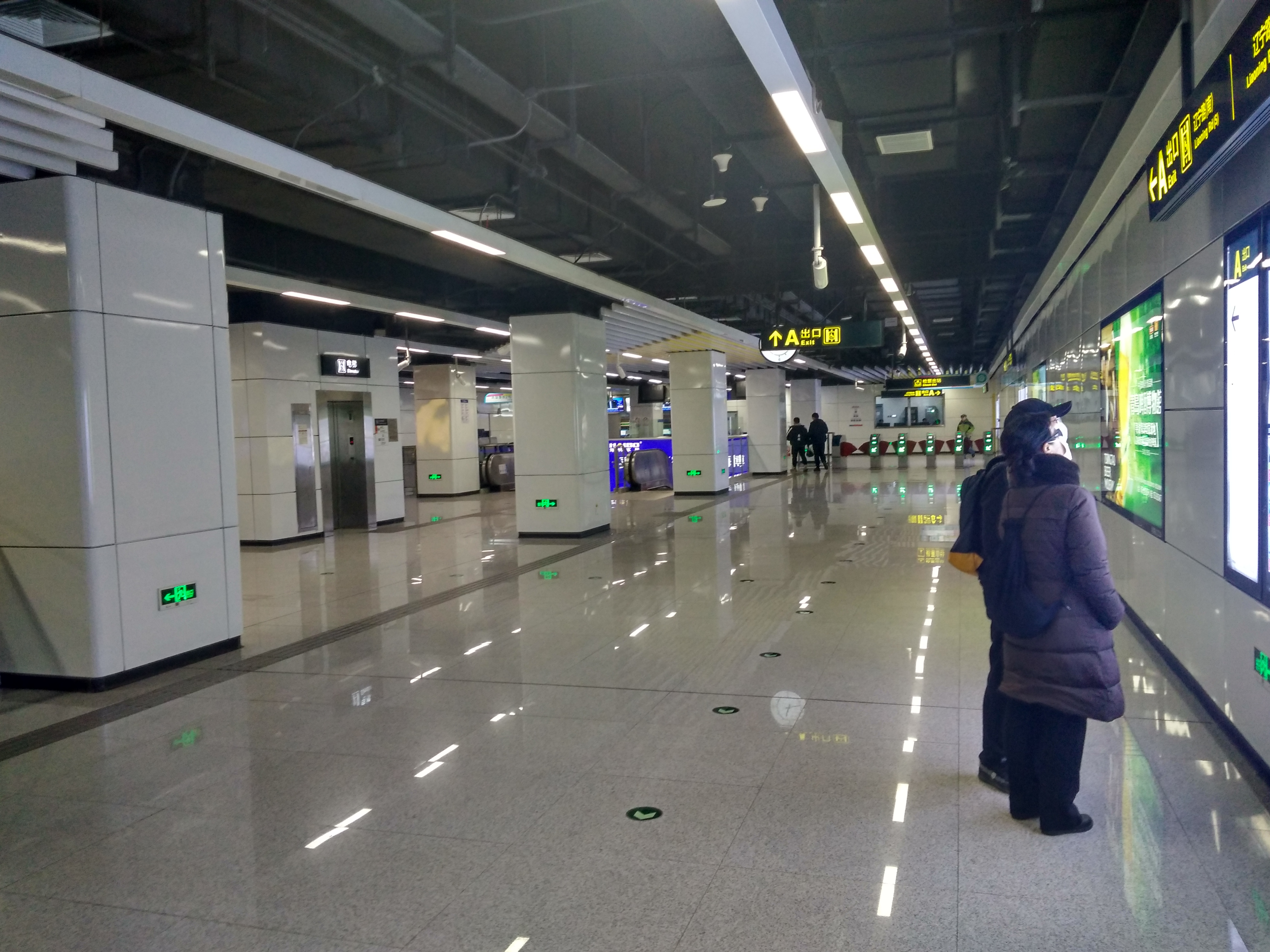
Concourse
