= Line 6 (Qingdao Metro) =

Metro line in Qingdao, China

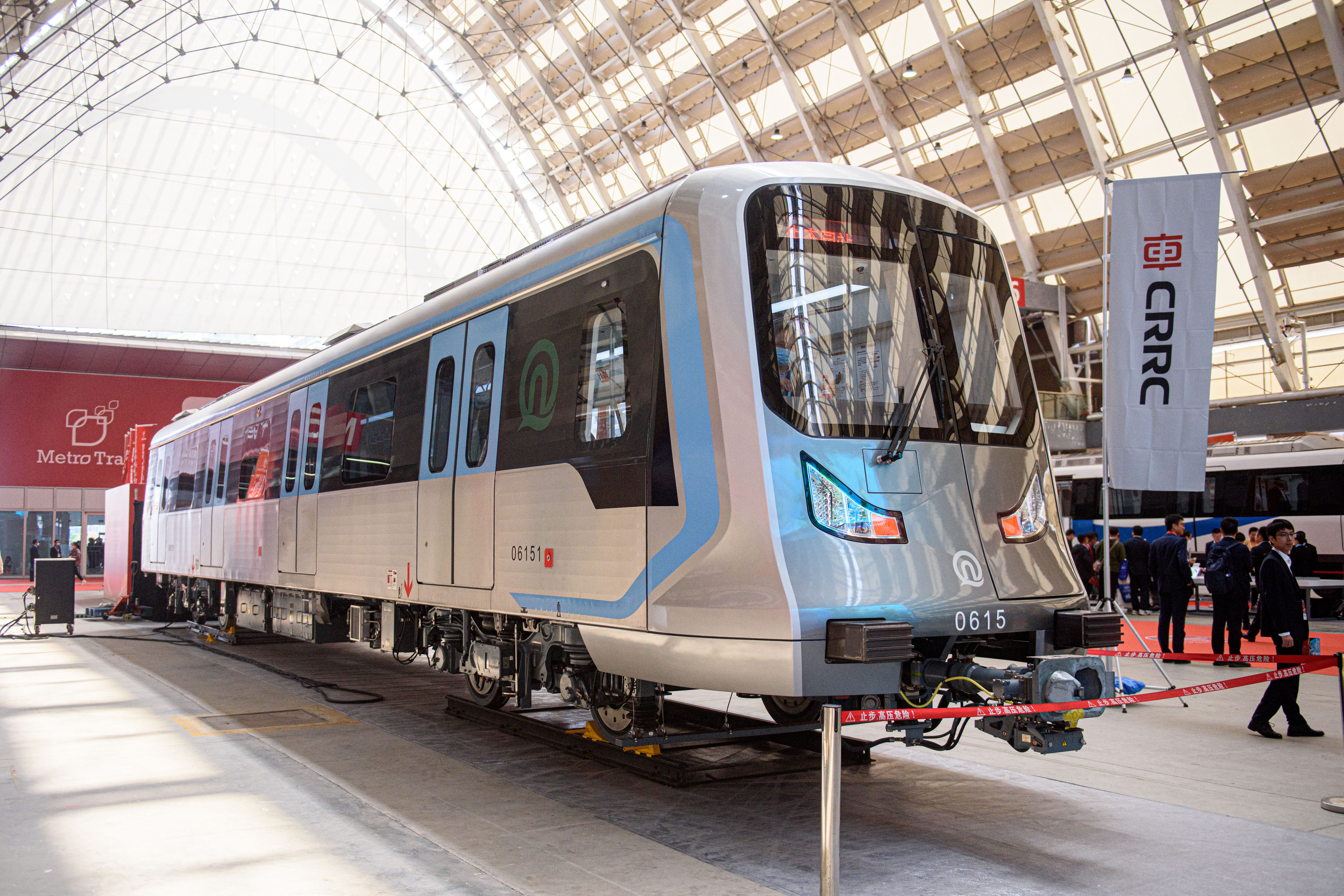
- A train of Qingdao Metro Line 6

Overview
- Status: In operation
- Owner: Government of Qingdao
- Locale: Qingdao, China
- Termini: Lingshan Bay; Hengyunshan Road
- Stations: 21 (Phase 1)

Service
- Type: Rapid transit
- System: Qingdao Metro
- Services: 1
- Operator: Qingdao Metro Corporation
- Depot: Zhuamashan depot

History
- Opened: 26 April 2024; 2 years ago

Technical
- Line length: 30.762 km (19.11 mi) (Phase 1)
- Number of tracks: 2
- Character: Underground
- Track gauge: 1,435 mm (4 ft 8 1/2 in)
- Electrification: Third rail

Line 6 of Qingdao Metro (Chinese: 青岛地铁6号线) is an underground metro line in Qingdao. It's the first automatic operation metro line in Qingdao.

== History ==
=== Phase I ===
Construction of phase I of line 6 started on 16 December 2019. Test run (without passengers) started on 12 September 2023. The phase I has started operation on 26 April 2024. It runs from Lingshan Bay to Hengyunshan Road. The section is 30.762 km in length with 21 stations.

=== Phase II ===
Construction of phase II of Line 6, 13.85 km with 10 stations from Qingdao West railway station to Lingshan Bay, started on 2 July 2022.

== Opening timeline ==
| Segment | Commencement | Length | Station(s) | Name |
|---|---|---|---|---|
| Lingshan Bay — Hengyunshan Road | 26 April 2024 | 30.762 km (19.11 mi) | 21 | Phase 1 |
| Qingdao West railway station — Lingshan Bay | TBA | 13.85 km (8.61 mi) | 10 | Phase 2 |

== Stations ==
| Station name | | Connections | Distance km | | Location |
| English | Chinese | Connections | Distance km | | Location |
|---|---|---|---|---|---|
| Qingdao West railway station | 青岛西站 | | | | Huangdao |
| Haixi Road | 海西路 | | | | Huangdao |
| Dongyue Road | 东岳路 | | | | Huangdao |
| Lingshanwan Road | 灵山湾路 | | | | Huangdao |
| Langyatai Road | 琅琊台路 | | | | Huangdao |
| Shuangzhu Road | 双珠路 | West Coast | | | Huangdao |
| Fenghuangshan Road | 凤凰山路 | | | | Huangdao |
| Chaoyangshan Road | 朝阳山路 | | | | Huangdao |
| Hainan Road | 海南路 | | | | Huangdao |
| Hongshulin | 红树林 | | | | Huangdao |
| Lingshan Bay | 灵山湾 | | - | 0 | Huangdao |
| Xintun | 辛屯 | West Coast | | | Huangdao |
| Huashan | 华山 | | | | Huangdao |
| Xinghaitan Road | 星海滩路 | | | | Huangdao |
| Zhaojiamiao (Film Metropolis) | 赵家庙（影视产业园） | | | | Huangdao |
| Maojiashan (Qingdao Huanghai University) | 毛家山（黄海学院） | | | | Huangdao |
| Ximenwai | 西门外 | | | | Huangdao |
| Beimenwai | 北门外 | | | | Huangdao |
| Wangjiagang | 王家港 | 1 | | | Huangdao |
| Jiudingshan | 九顶山 | | | | Huangdao |
| Qiantangjiang Road (Qingdao Technical College) | 钱塘江路（青职学院） | | | | Huangdao |
| Pashan (Qingdao Binhai University) | 扒山（滨海学院） | | | | Huangdao |
| West Coast Campus of the Affiliated Hospital of Qingdao University | 青大附院西海岸院区 | | | | Huangdao |
| Gangtou | 港头 | | | | Huangdao |
| Xuejiapozi | 薛家泊子 | | | | Huangdao |
| Majialou | 马家楼 | | | | Huangdao |
| Zhuamashan | 抓马山 | | | | Huangdao |
| Qingdao No.9 High School (Xingfuxiaozhen) | 青岛九中（幸福小镇） | | | | Huangdao |
| Heluobu (Sino-German Ecopark) | 河洛埠（中德生态园） | | | | Huangdao |
| Shanwanghe (Fulai Community) | 山王河（福莱社区） | | | | Huangdao |
| Hengyunshan Road | 横云山路 | | | | Huangdao |
