= West Coast Line (Qingdao Metro) =

Metro line in Qingdao, China

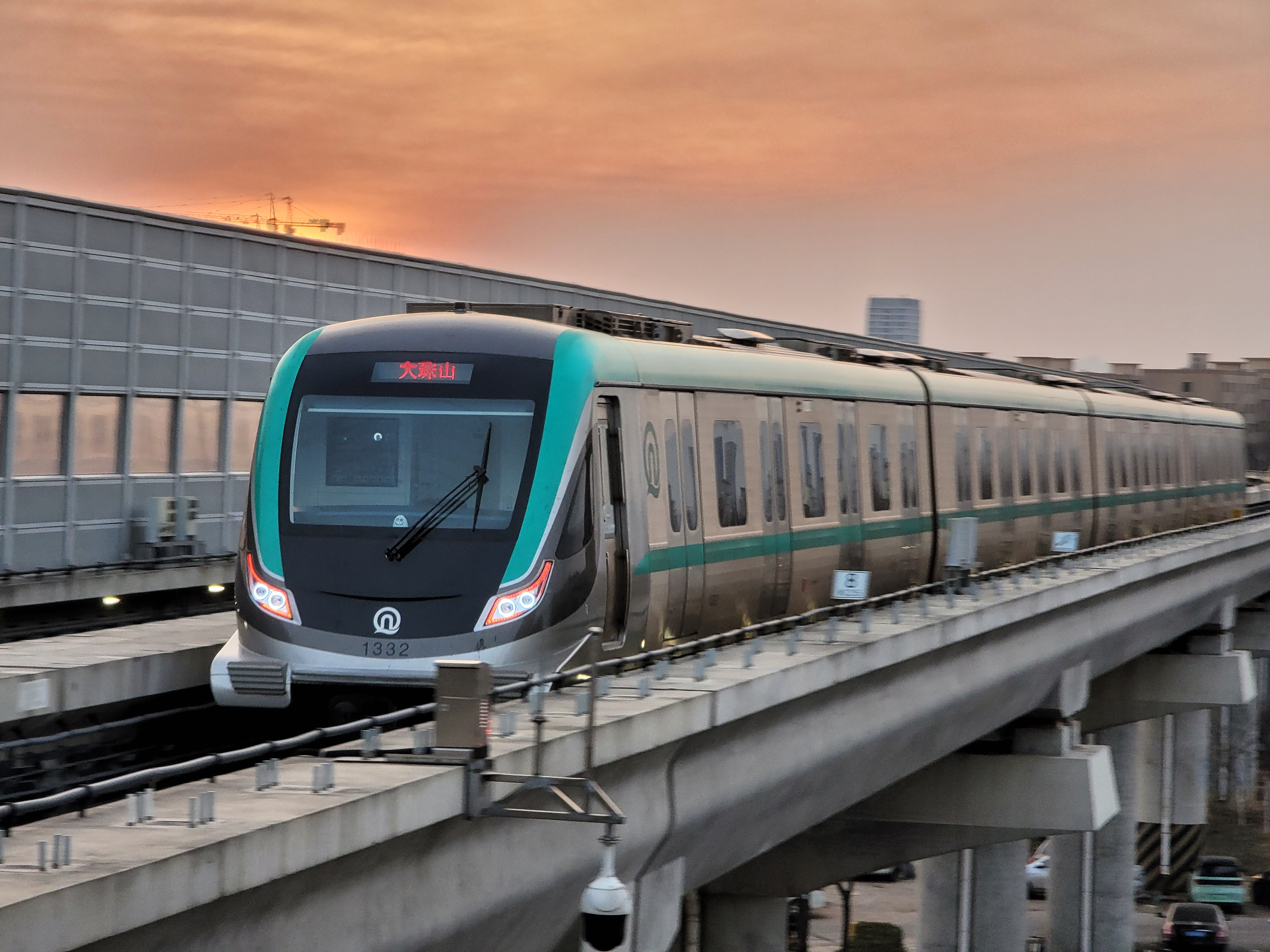
- A train leaving Fenghuangshan Road station

Overview
- Other name(s): Line 13 (13号线); West Coast Rail Transit Express Line (西海岸轨道交通快线); Line R3 (R3线); Jiaonan line (胶南线); Hongdao–Jiaonan intercity rail transit Southern section (红岛到胶南城际轨道交通南段)
- Status: In operation
- Owner: Government of Qingdao
- Locale: Qingdao, China
- Termini: Jialingjiang West Road; Dongjiakou Railway Station
- Stations: 23

Service
- Type: Rapid transit
- System: Qingdao Metro
- Services: 1
- Operator(s): Qingdao West Coast Mass Rail Transit Corporation
- Rolling stock: Chinese Type B1

History
- Opened: 26 December 2018; 6 years ago

Technical
- Line length: 69.6 km (43.25 mi)
- Number of tracks: 2
- Character: Underground and elevated
- Track gauge: 1,435 mm (4 ft 8 1/2 in)

The West Coast Line (西海岸快线) of the Qingdao Metro, formerly Line 13, is a suburban metro line in Qingdao. The line runs across much of coastal Huangdao District in Qingdao. It is connected via the southern section of Line 1.

The line was put into trial operation on December 26, 2018.The total length of the line is about 70km, mainly laid on elevated tracks, with 23 stations, 1 vehicle base, and 2 parking lots. In October 2023, the line was extended 2.8 kilometers to the north.

== Opening timeline ==
Segment	Commencement	Length	Station(s)	Name
Jinggangshan Road — Dongjiakou Railway Station	26 December 2018	66.813 km (41.52 mi)	21	Phase 1 & Phase 2 South section
Jinggangshan Road — Jialingjiang West Road	26 October 2023	2.8 km (1.74 mi)	2	Phase 2 North section

== Stations ==
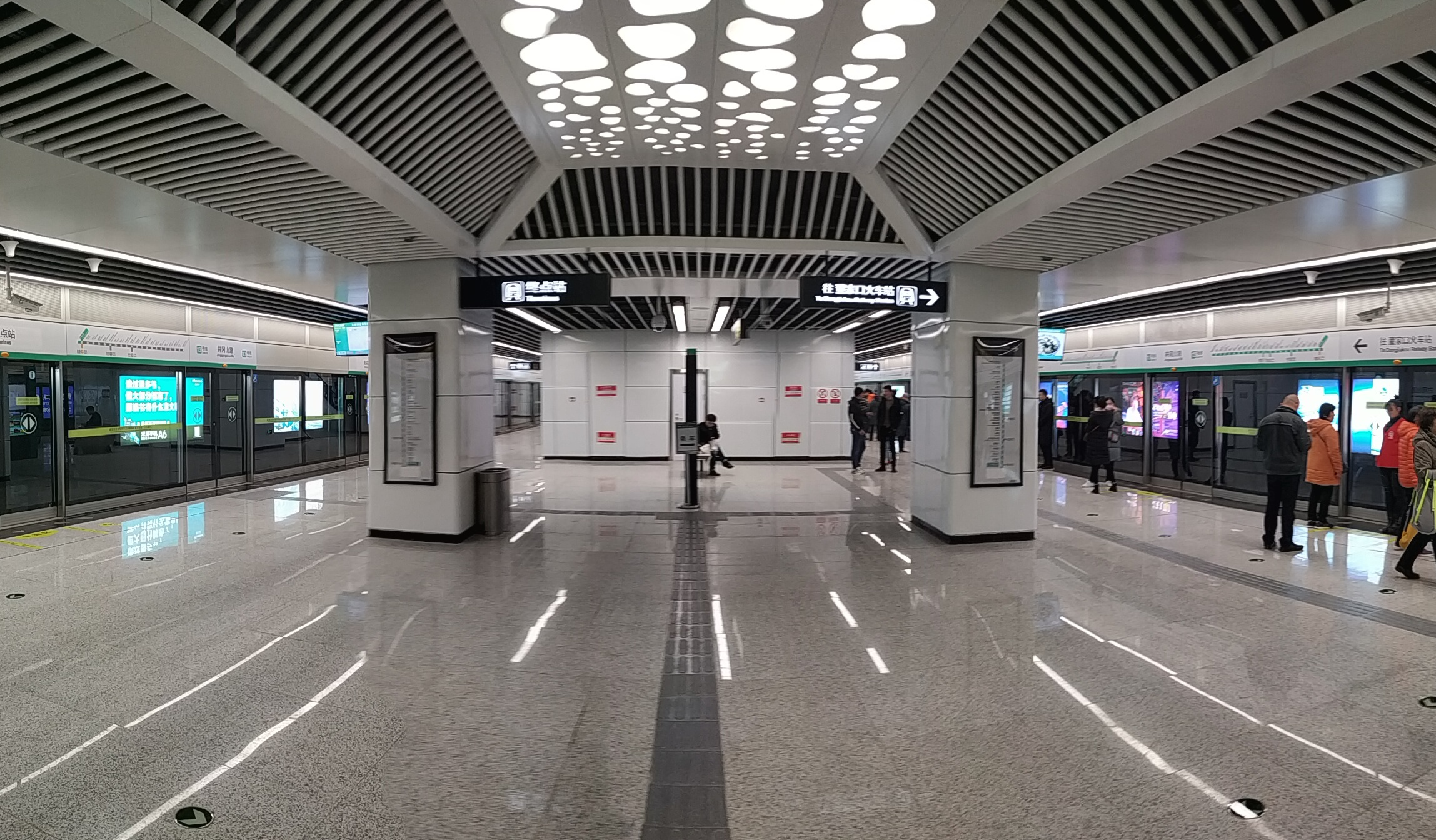
Platform of Jinggangshan Road station

Station name		Connections	Distance km		Location
English	Chinese	Connections	Distance km		Location
Jialingjiang West Road	嘉陵江西路	12 (Planned)			Huangdao
Xiangjiang Road	香江路				Huangdao
Jinggangshan Road	井冈山路	1	0.0000	0.0000	Huangdao
Jimiya	积米崖		3.9493	3.9493	Huangdao
Lingshanwei	灵山卫		2.4894	6.4387	Huangdao
Xueyuan Road	学院路		1.8875	8.3262	Huangdao
Chaoyangshan	朝阳山		1.9967	10.3229	Huangdao
Xintun	辛屯	6	1.6053	11.9282	Huangdao
Lianghe	两河		1.9995	13.9277	Huangdao
Yinzhu	隐珠		2.9802	16.9709	Huangdao
Fenghuangshan Road	凤凰山路		1.1276	18.0355	Huangdao
Shuangzhu Road	双珠路	6 (unconfirmed)	2.4400	20.4755	Huangdao
Shiji Avenue	世纪大道		2.7609	23.2364	Huangdao
Shenghai Road (World Expo City)	盛海路（世博城）		2.4783	25.7147	Huangdao
Dazhu Mountain	大珠山		2.2812	27.9959	Huangdao
Zhangjialou	张家楼		6.2500	34.2459	Huangdao
Guzhenkou	古镇口		5.9347	40.1806	Huangdao
Longwan Bay	龙湾		7.6700	47.8506	Huangdao
Langya	琅琊		3.8788	51.7294	Huangdao
Gongkou Bay	贡口湾		3.5130	55.2424	Huangdao
Dongjiakou Port	董家口港		3.7655	59.0079	Huangdao
Poli	泊里		2.7792	61.7871	Huangdao
Dongjiakou Railway Station	董家口火车站	DTK	4.9243	66.7114	Huangdao
