= Qingdao Metro =

Rapid transit system in Qingdao, China

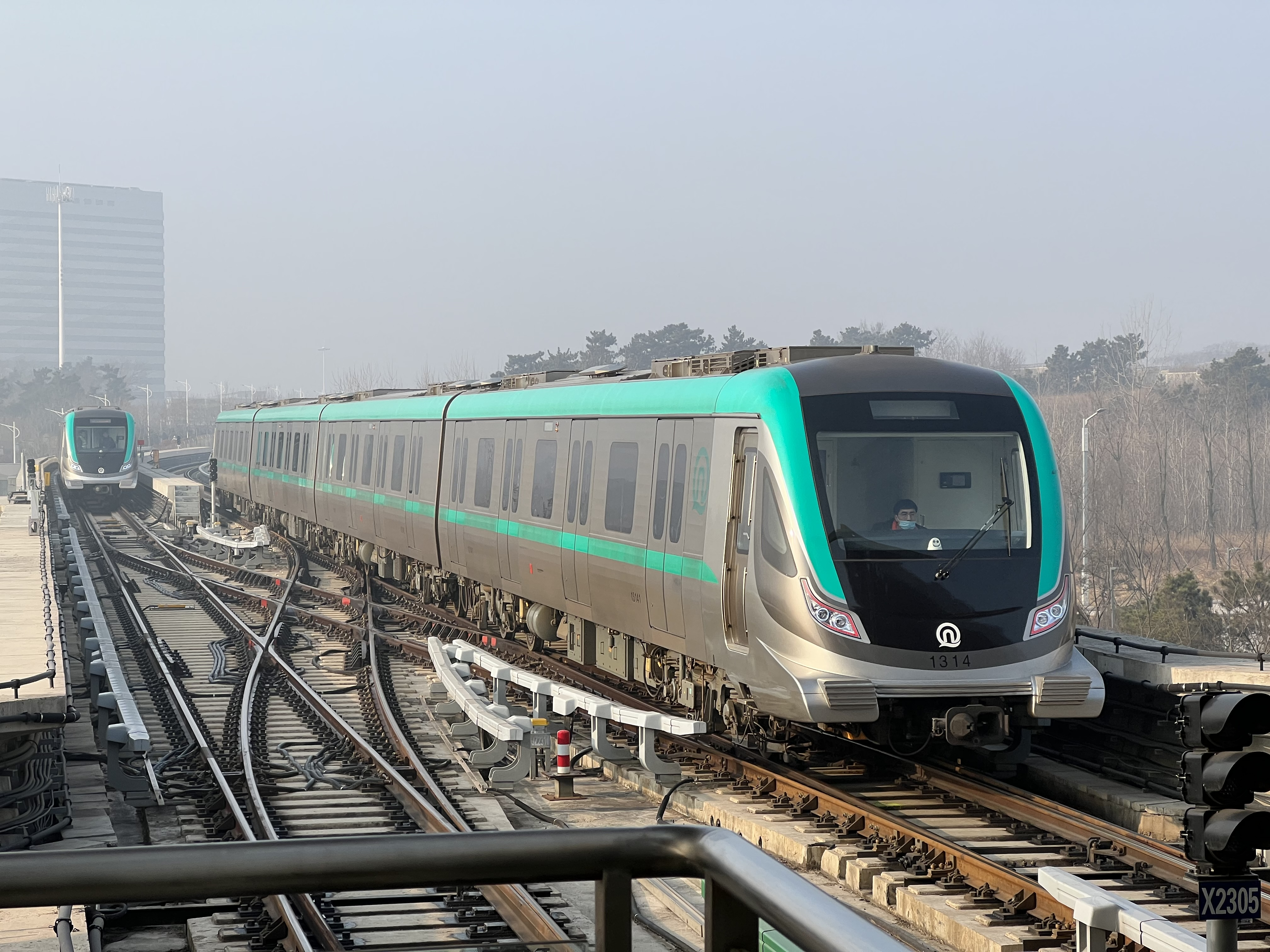

Overview
- Owner: Qingdao Metro Corporation
- Locale: Qingdao, Shandong, China
- Transit type: Rapid transit
- Number of lines: 8 (operating)
- Number of stations: 176 (operating)
- Daily ridership: 2.2443 million (highest record on 1 May 2023); 2.28 million (highest record in 2025, cumulative passenger volume from 31 December 2025 on 12:00 am to 1 January 2026 on 3:57 am)
- Annual ridership: 410.955 million (2023)
- Website: www.qd-metro.com

Operation
- Began operation: December 16, 2015; 10 years ago
- Operator: Qingdao Metro Corporation
- Number of vehicles: >86

Technical
- System length: 359.36 km (223.3 mi) (operating)
- Track gauge: 1,435 mm (4 ft 8 1/2 in) standard gauge
System map

Qingdao Metro
- Simplified Chinese: 青岛地铁
- Traditional Chinese: 青島地鐵
Transcriptions
Standard Mandarin
- Hanyu Pinyin: Qīngdǎo Dìtiě

Qingdao Metro (Chinese: 青岛地铁; pinyin: Qīngdǎo dìtiě) is a rapid transit system in Qingdao, Shandong province, China. The first line, Line 3 (north section) began operation on December 16, 2015.

== Visual Recognition/Logo ==
The text part of the logo is the company's abbreviation Chinese "青岛地铁" and English capital "QINGDAO METRO". The graphical part is based on the English word initials "Q" (as for Qingdao) as the main element. The overall shape is round, and the interior is shown in the subway tunnel entrance. The waves below highlight the characteristics of the coastal city. The overall green application means that the metro is a green and environmentally friendly vehicle.

According to their official website, the current motto of Qingdao Metro is Prosperous happiness (畅达幸福).

== Lines in operation ==
Line	Terminals (District)		Commencement	Newest Extension	Length km	Stations
1	Wangjiagang (Huangdao)	Dongguozhuang (Chengyang)	December 24, 2020	December 30, 2021	59.82	41
2	Sichuan Road (Qingdao Ferry Terminal) (Shibei)	Licun Park (Licang)	December 10, 2017	December 28, 2024	28.227	25
3	Qingdao Railway Station (Shinan)	Qingdao North Railway Station (Licang)	December 16, 2015	December 18, 2016	24.472	22
4	Hall of the People (Shinan)	Dahedong (Laoshan)	December 26, 2022	—	30.71	25
6	Hengyunshan Road (Huangdao)	Lingshan Bay (Huangdao)	April 26, 2024	—	30.76	21
8	May 4th Square (Shinan)	Jiaozhou North Railway Station (Jiaozhou)	December 24, 2020	September 22, 2026	61.4	18
Oceantec Valley	Miaoling Road (Laoshan)	Qiangu Mountain (Jimo)	April 23, 2018	—	54.371	21
West Coast	Jialingjiang West Road (Huangdao)	Dongjiakou Railway Station (Huangdao)	December 26, 2018	October 26, 2023	69.6	23
Total					359.36	176

=== Line 1 ===
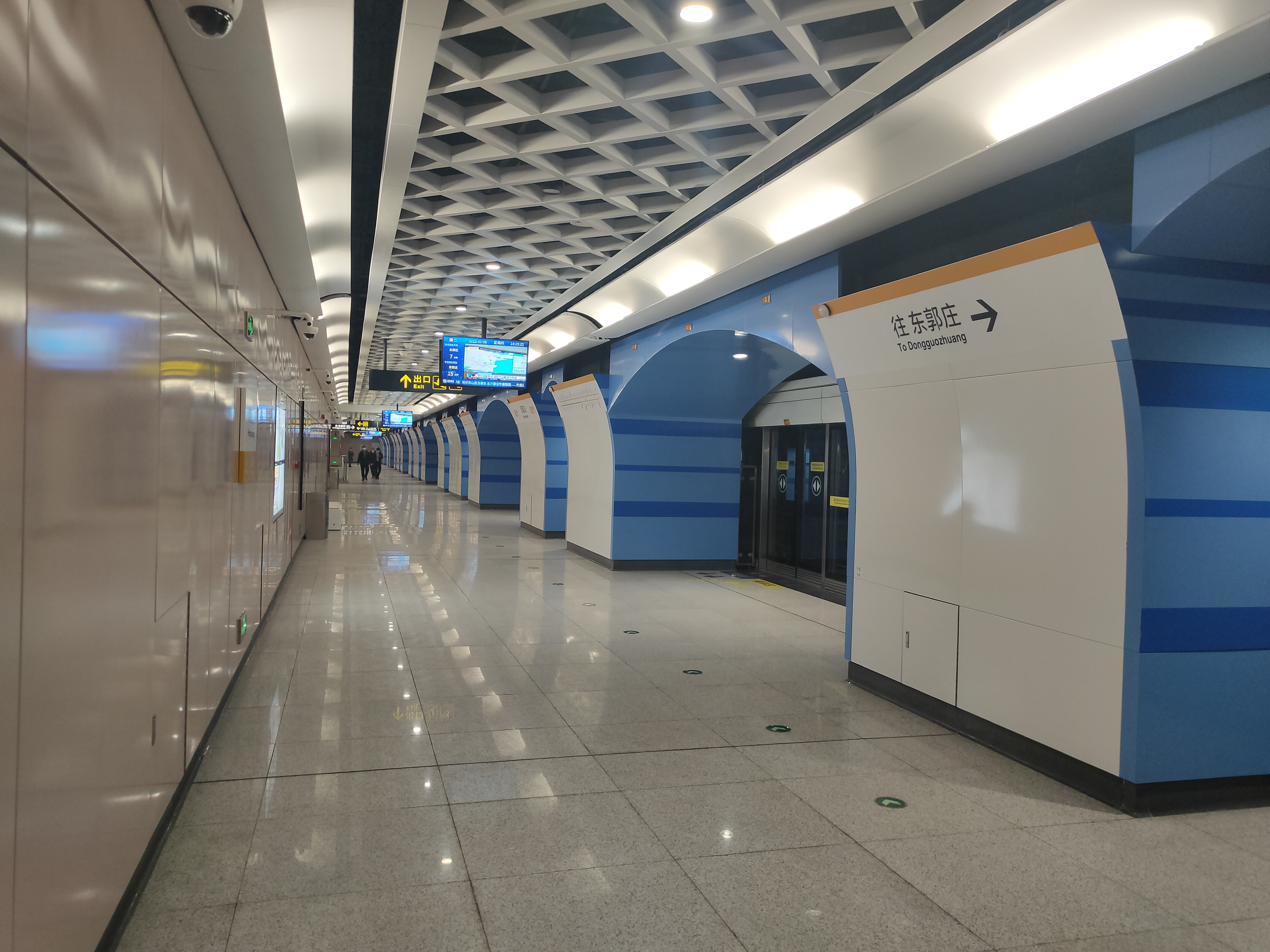
Fenghuangdao station of Line 1

The northern section between Qingdao North Railway Station and Dongguozhuang Station was opened on 24 December 2020. The southern section between Qingdao North Railway Station and Wangjiagang Station was opened on 30 December 2021. The north section is 22 km (13.7 mi) and the south section is 38 km (23.6 mi), the entire of Line 1 is 60 km (37.3 mi) in length. Line 1's color is yellow.

=== Line 2 ===
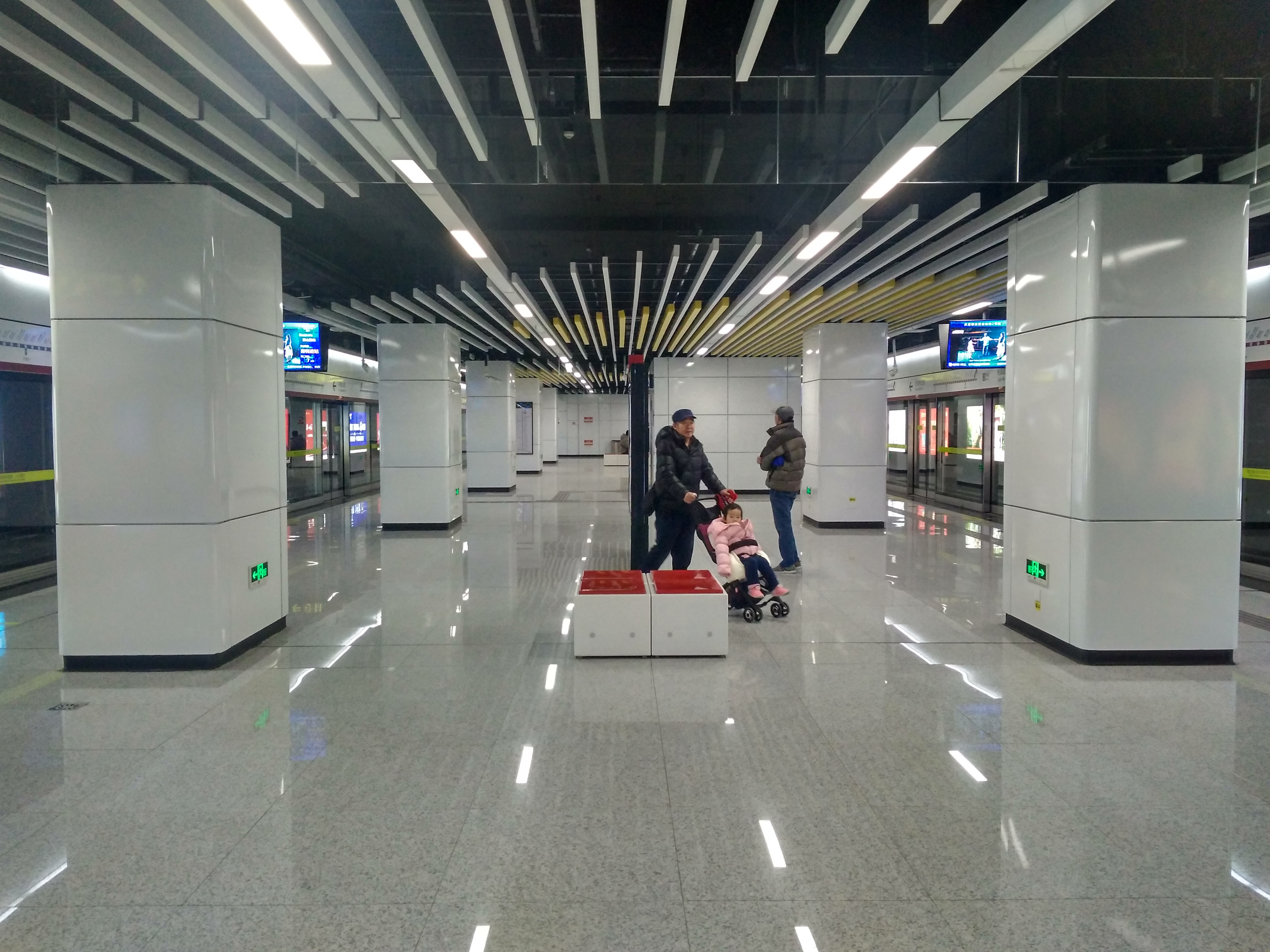
Lijin Road station of Line 2

Construction on Line 2 began in 2012, and the completed line will comprise 22 stations, with a total length of 24.4 km (15.2 mi). Line 2 began passenger service on December 10, 2017, between Zhiquan Road station and Licun Park station. The western section from Zhiquan Road station to Taishan Road station opened on December 16, 2019. The 3.84 km (2.39 mi) extension from Taishan Road station to Sichuan Road (Qingdao Ferry Terminal) opened on 18 December 2024.Line 2's color is red.

=== Line 3 ===
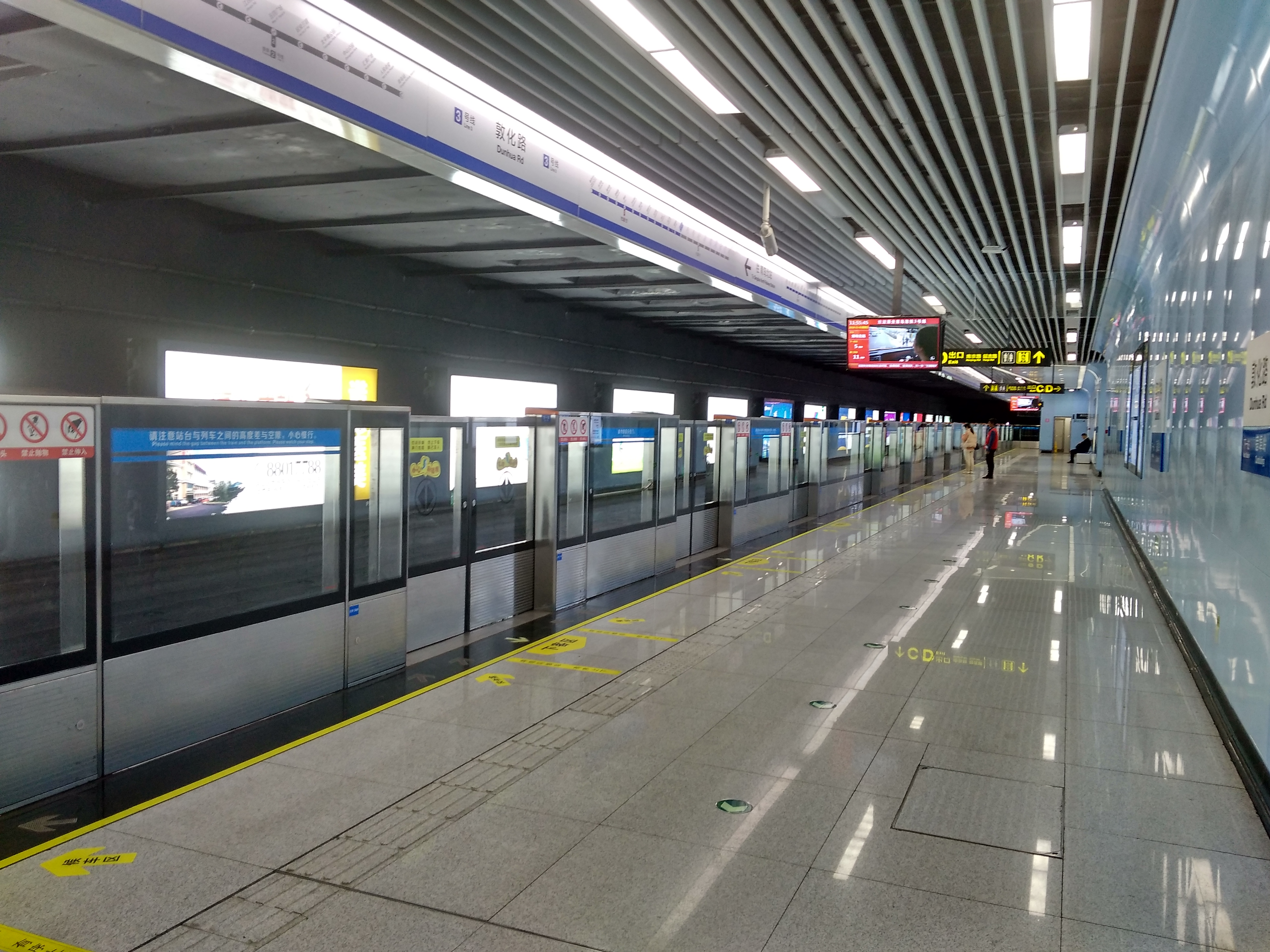
Dunhua Road station of Line 3

The construction of the first line, Line 3, began on November 30, 2009. With 13 billion yuan ($1.9 billion) of funding, the line comprises 22 stations, with a total length of 24.5 km (15.2 mi). The northern half of Line 3 began trial passenger operation on December 16, 2015, and the southern half opened a year later, on December 18, 2016. Line 3's color is blue.

=== Line 4 ===
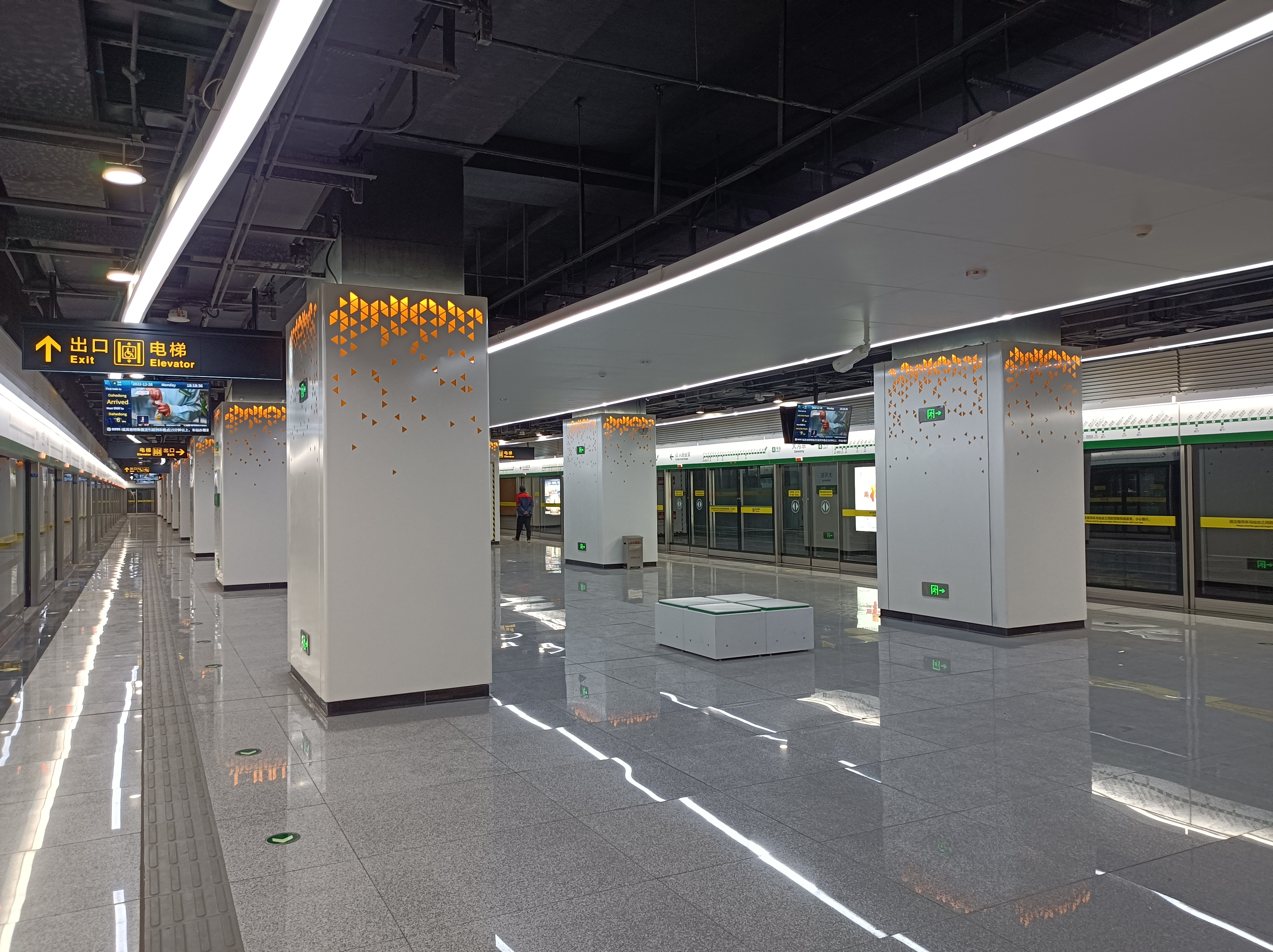
Dahedong station of Line 4

Line 4 between Hall of the People station and Dahedong station operation on December 26, 2022, with 25 stations and 30.7 km (19.1 mi) of track. Line 4's color is green.

=== Line 6 ===
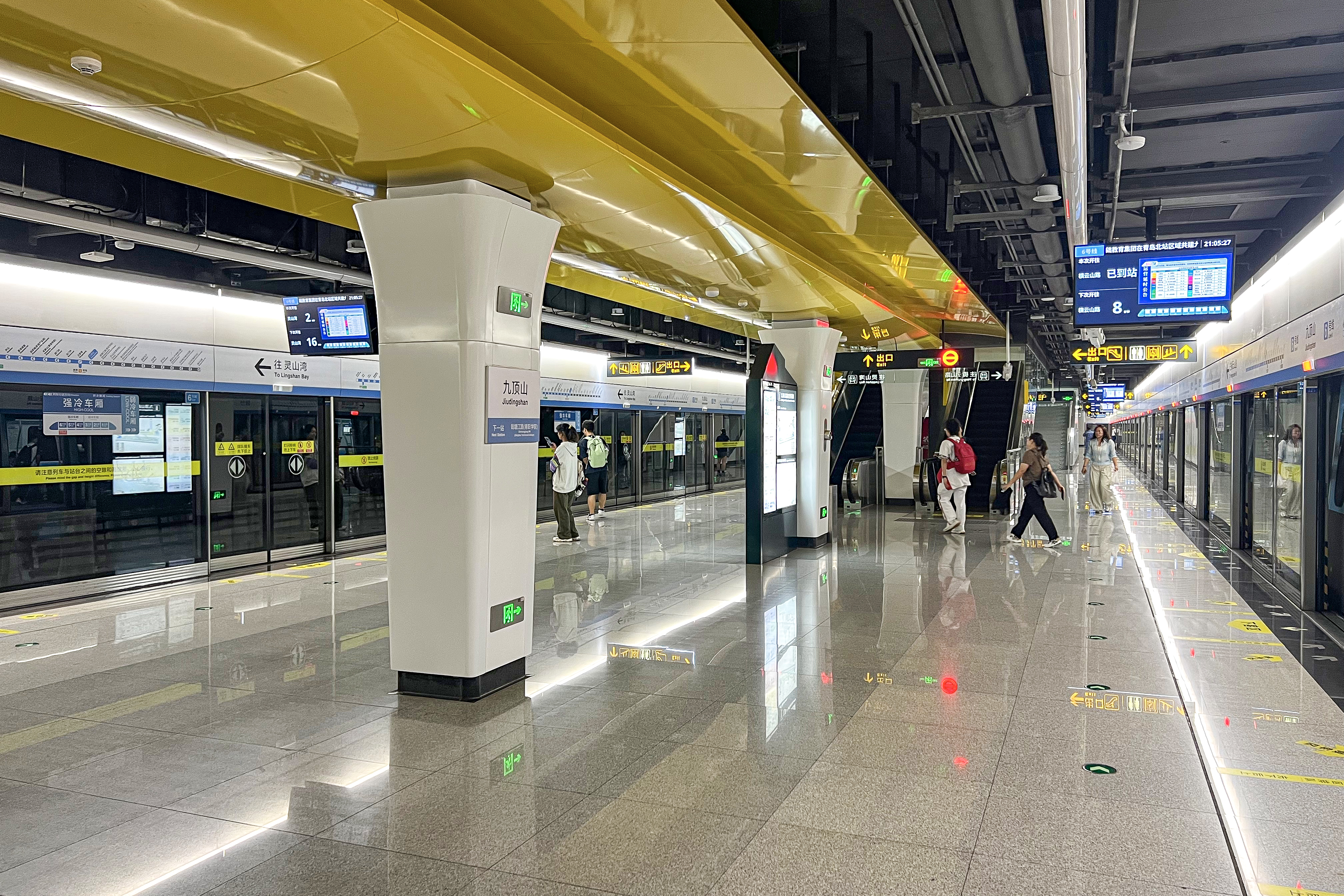
Jiudingshan station of Line 6

Construction for Line 6 Phase I started on December 16, 2019. Line 6 (Phase 1, Lingshan Bay station to Hengyunshan Rd station) is a 30.762 km (19.115 mi) line with 21 underground stations. Phase 1 of Line 6 opened on April 26, 2024. Line 6's color is light blue, and is currently the only line with driverless capacity.

=== Line 8 ===
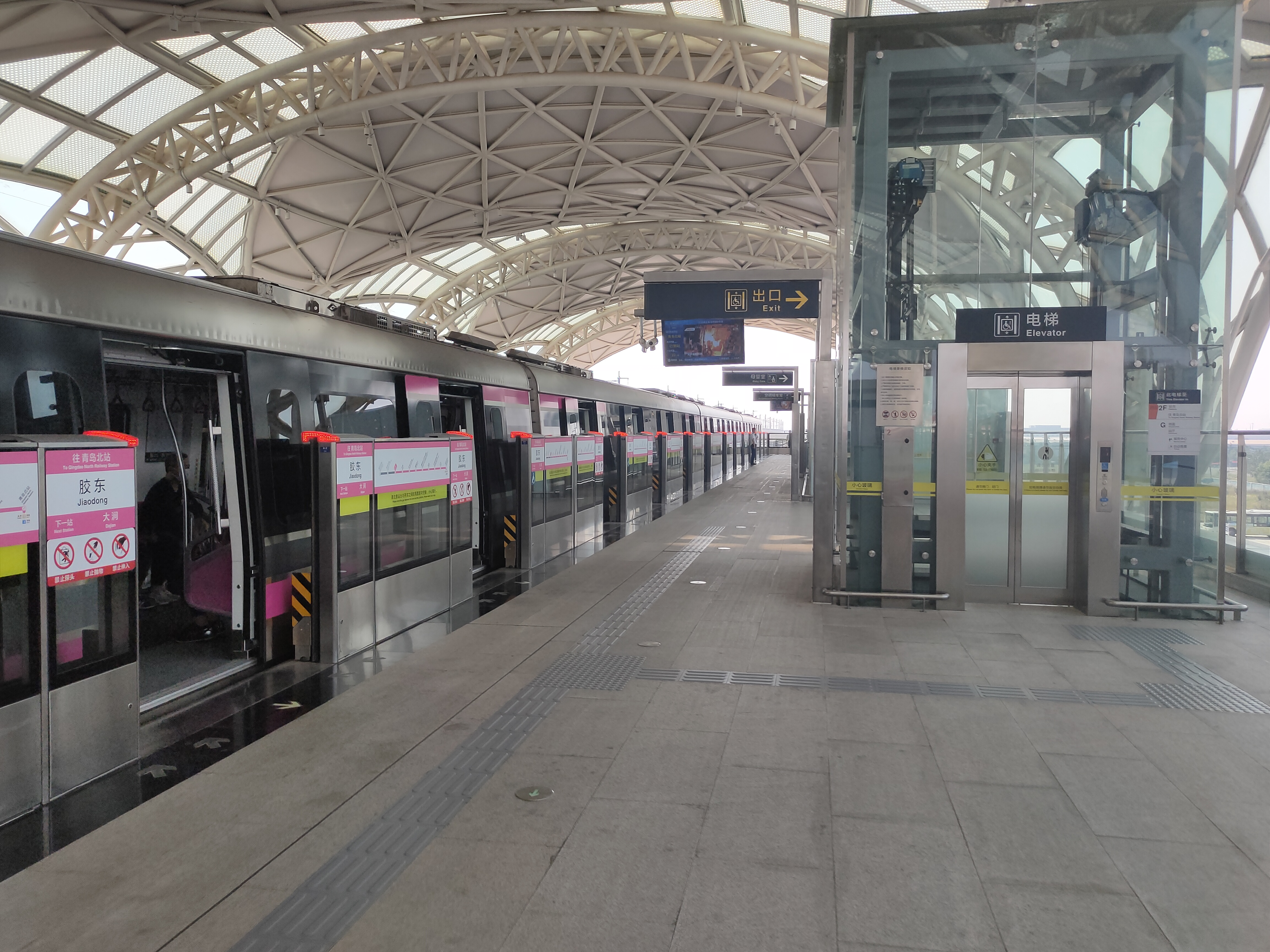
Jiaodong station of Line 8

The northern section opened in December 2020, and the southern section and the branch is currently under construction. Line 8's color is pink.

=== Oceantec Valley Line (Line 11) ===
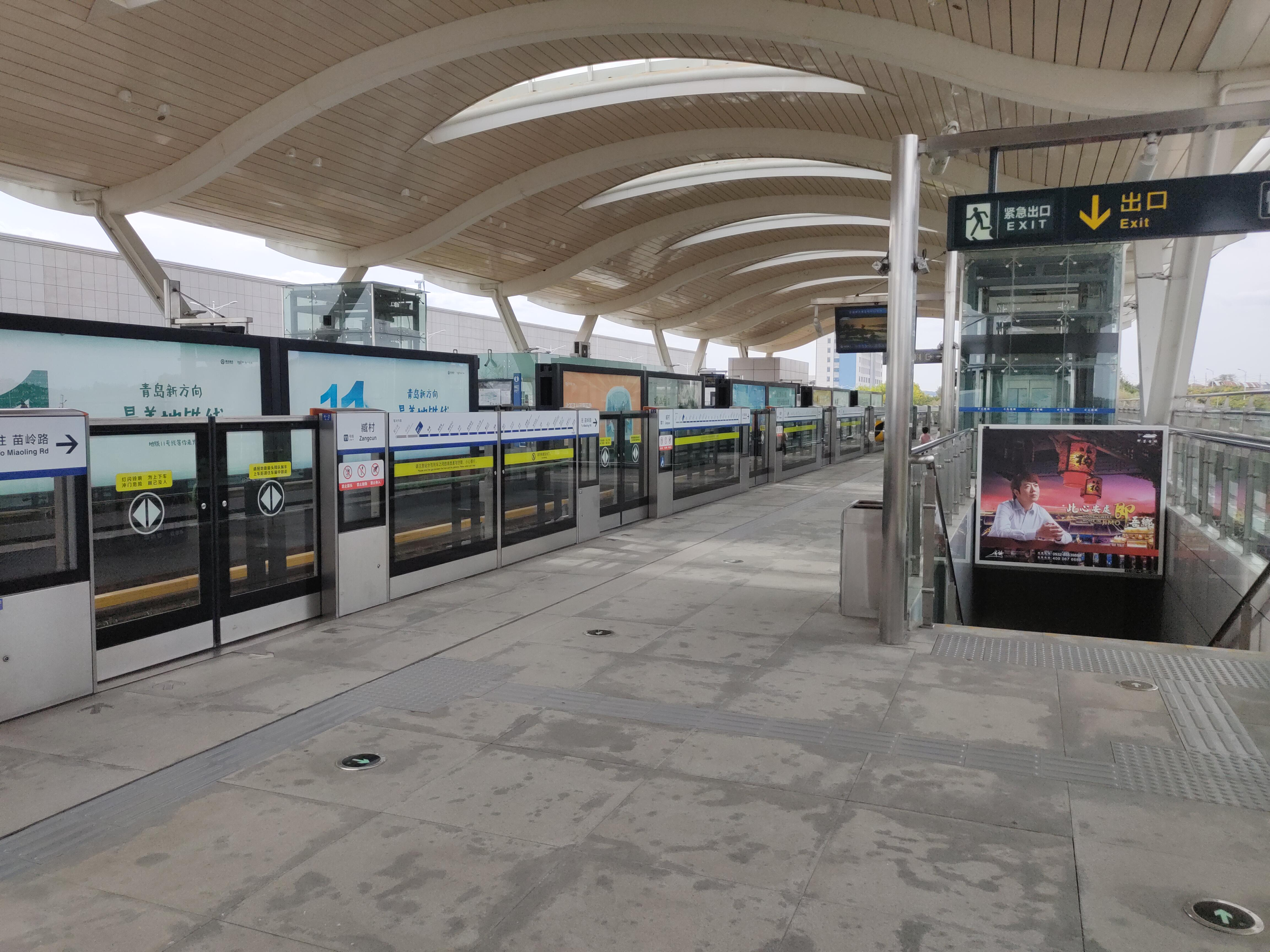
Zhangcun station of the Oceantec Valley Line

Phase I of Line 11 between Miaoling Road station and Qiangu Mountain station, which extends from Laoshan District to Jimo District, with 21 stations and 54.4 km (33.8 mi) of track, began operation on April 23, 2018. Line 11's (renamed the Oceantec Valley Line in 2024) color is dark blue.

=== West Coast Line (Line 13) ===
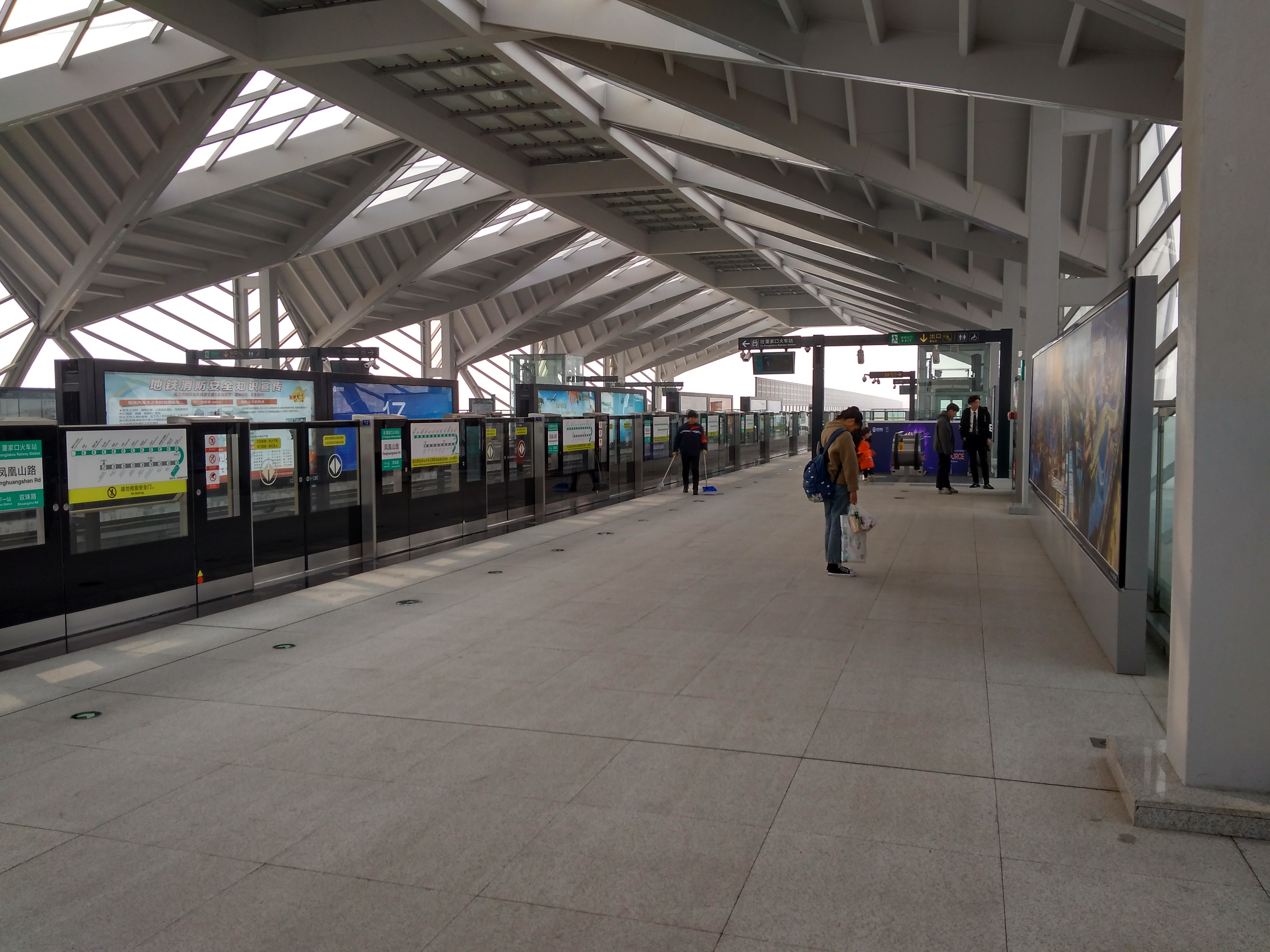
Fenghuangshan Road station of the West Coast Line

Phase I and Phase II of Line 13 between Jinggangshan Road and Dongjiakou Railway Station started operation on December 26, 2018, with 21 stations and 66.813 km (41.516 mi) of track. Line 13's (renamed the West Coast Line in 2024) color is teal. A 2.8 km (1.7 mi) extension to the north opened in 2023.

== History ==
=== Project Proposal (1935) ===
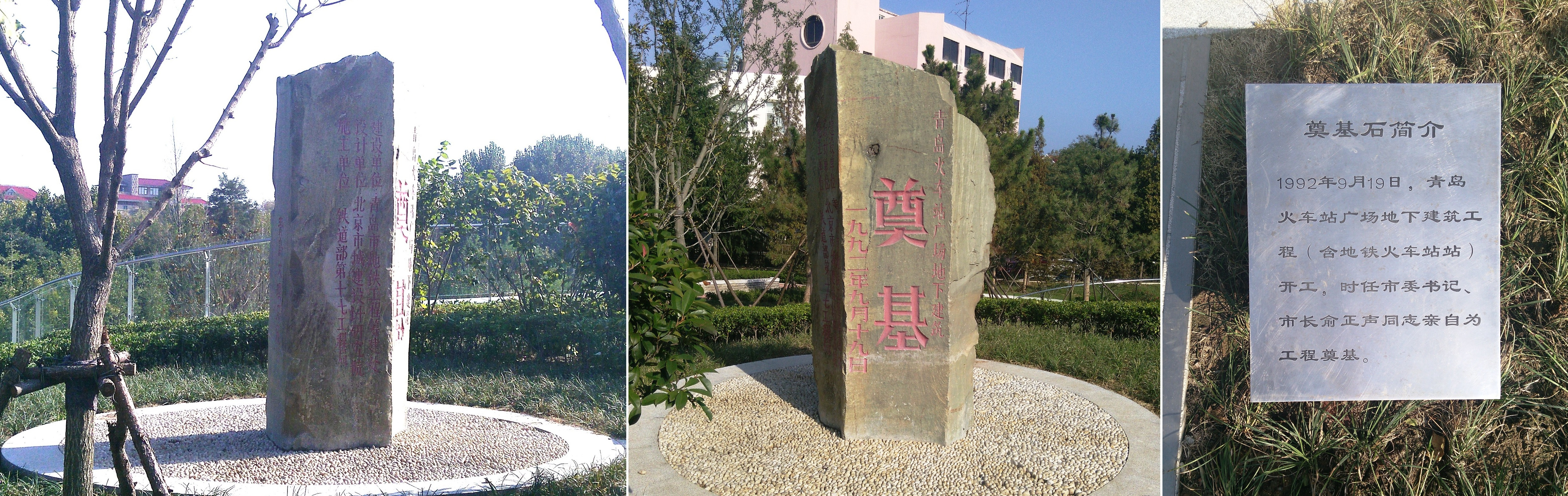
The founding stone of Qingdao Metro at Taipingjiao Park

Evolution of Qingdao Metro (2015 - 2021)

In 1935, Qingdao proposed an urban development plan that included the construction of "inner city high-speed transportation" systems, specifically rail transit express lines. This made Qingdao the first city in China to propose building a metro. The planners emphasized the importance of early preparation, cautioning against neglecting the project simply because the need for high-speed transportation seemed distant. The plan outlined a total of 42 kilometers of track, with underground lines in the city center and elevated lines out in the suburbs. All vehicles were to be powered by electricity to maintain a clean and hygienic city environment. However, due to the social unrest of the time, these plans remained on paper and were never realized.

=== First Construction Attempt (1987-2000) ===
In April 1987, Qingdao officially began planning and conducting feasibility studies for a rail transit network. By 1989, an initial plan for a "two lines and one loop" network, covering about 48 km, was developed. In 1990, the Qingdao Municipal Planning Commission submitted a proposal for the first phase of the Qingdao metro project to the National Planning Commission. By June 1991, the project had gained approval from the State Council, with the official project document numbered (1991).

In 1993, the Qingdao Metro Engineering Construction Office was set up, followed by the formation of the Qingdao Metro Company to oversee the metro planning and construction. In 1994, the "Qingdao Urban Comprehensive Transportation Plan" expanded the network plan to a "four lines and one loop" structure, totaling approximately 96 km. That same year, the Qingdao Metro Company was officially established, and on December 24, construction began on a test section of the Line 1 Phase 1 project, which included "two stations and one section of track."

However, on December 28, 1995, the State Council issued a notice to halt the approval of urban metro projects, requiring that several approved projects stop signing external contracts. The National Planning Commission suspended the approval of feasibility study reports and construction starts. By 2000, the test section of the Metro was completed and inspected, and the "Qingdao Metro Phase 1 Feasibility Study Report" was submitted to the National Planning Commission for approval, but no response was received.

=== Substantial Construction (2008–Present) ===
In September 2008, the "Qingdao Urban Rapid Transit Construction Plan"—which included Lines 1, 2, and 3—was submitted to the National Development and Reform Commission (NDRC) for approval. In December, the Ministry of Environmental Protection issued a document (No. 85 [2009]) approving the environmental impact report, and the NDRC's expert review approved the construction plan. This marked the official start of preliminary work on the new metro test section, with its scope initially defined.

On February 20, 2009, the construction of a new metro test section, which included one station, Hexi Station (now called Metro Building) and one section of track from Hexi Station to Bao'er Station (now called Changsha Road), was confirmed. In April, a review meeting was held for the "Qingdao Urban Rapid Transit Construction Plan (2009-2016)," which resulted in the adjustment of the plan to focus only on Lines 2 and 3. The first phase of Line 2 and Line 3 were scheduled for construction in two phases from 2010 to 2016, with a total length of 54.7 km and 46 stations.

On June 26, 2009, construction of the test section began. On November 30, a groundbreaking ceremony for the Qingdao Metro was held at Metro Building Station. During the construction of Line 3, various challenges such as geological issues and relocation difficulties caused delays. The first section of Line 3 opened December 16, 2015.

== Short-term plan ==
=== Phase 3 construction plan ===
The Phase 3 construction plan (2021-2026) of Qingdao Metro was approved by National Development and Reform Commission on August 19, 2021.

Line	Terminals		Construction started	Opening date	Length in km	New stations	Source
2 Phase 2	Licun Park	International Horticultural Expo Garden	2021	2026	8.9	8	
5	Maidao	Yunling Road	2021	2028	32.7	29	
6 (Phase 2)	Xintun Road	Qingdao West railway station	2022	2027	14.7	10	
7 (Phase 2 North)	Dongguozhuang	Yingpu Road	2021	2027	12.8	11	
7 (Phase 2 South)	Xingguo Road	Cangkou	2021	2027	3.7	3	
8 (Branch)	Dajian	Jiaozhou Railway Station	2022	2027	20.4	11	
9	Haixicun	Gongdiansuo	2022	2027	16.6	13	
15	Xiawangbu	Sifangchang	2022	2028	30.8	15	

== Rolling stock ==
All lines use standard B1 type rolling stock. Typically they operate as six-car-trains, whereas Oceantec Valley Line and West Coast Line use four-car-trains. Power is supplied via a third rail with 1500 V DC. On each line run trains with different appearance and livery.

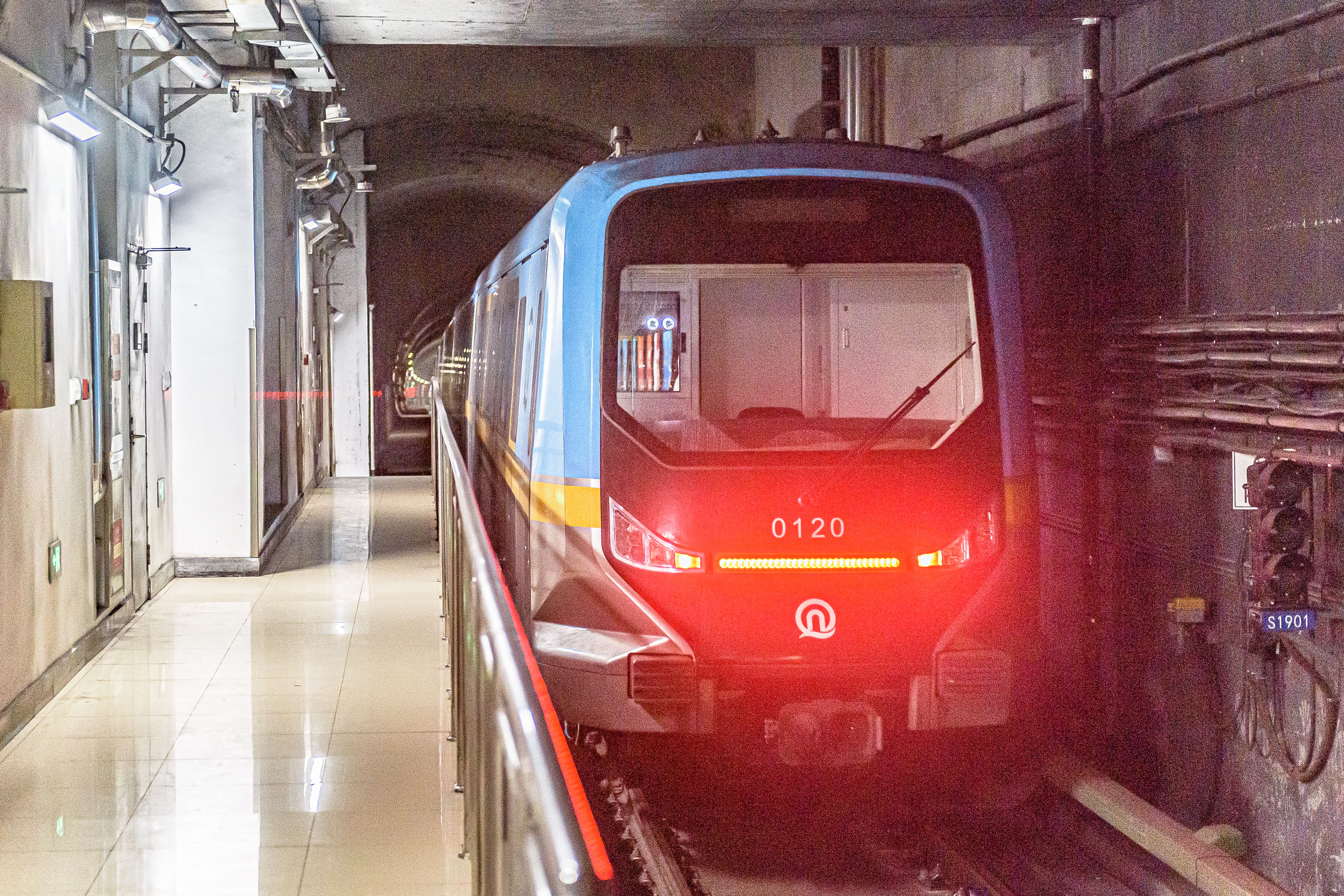
Line 1

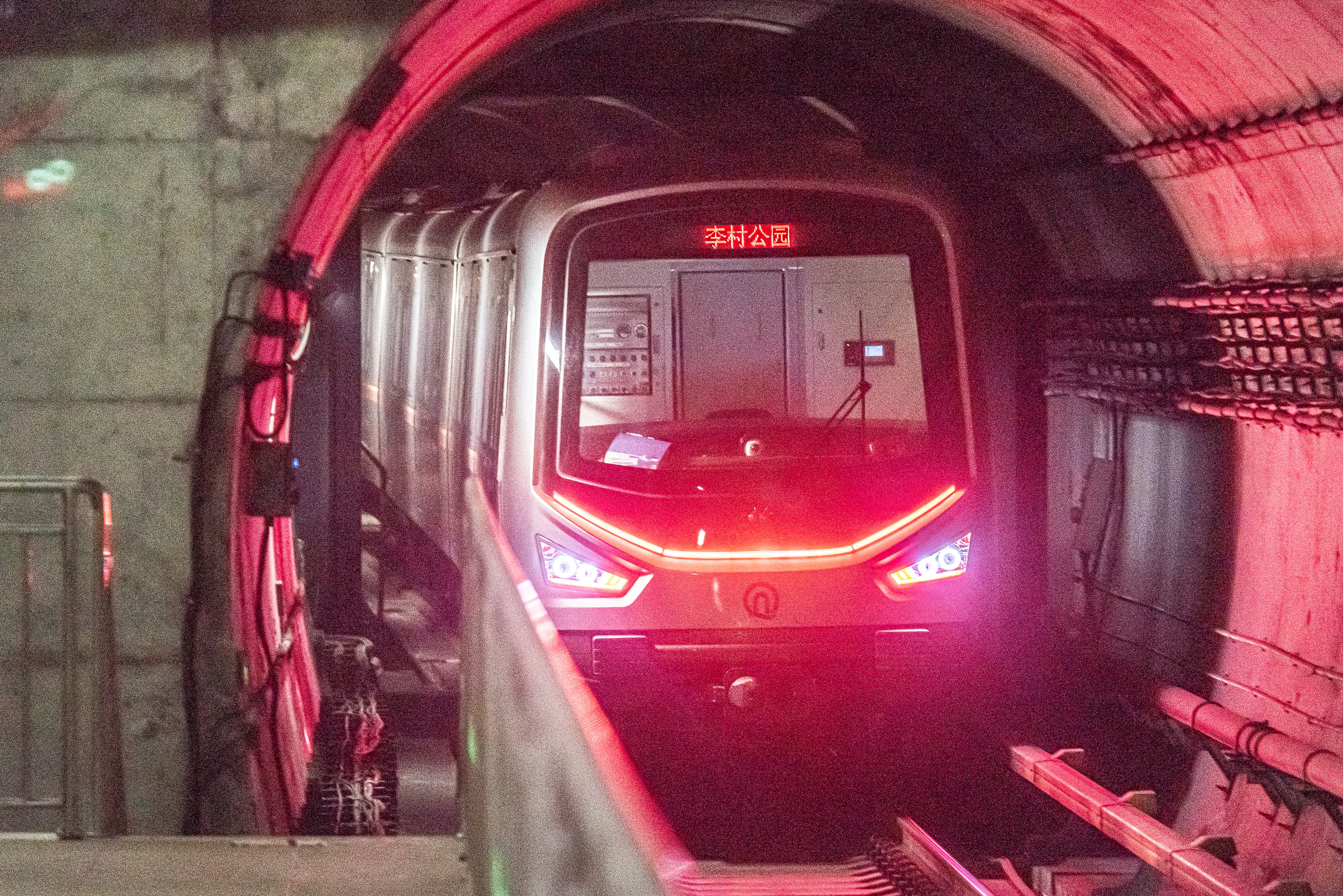
Line 2

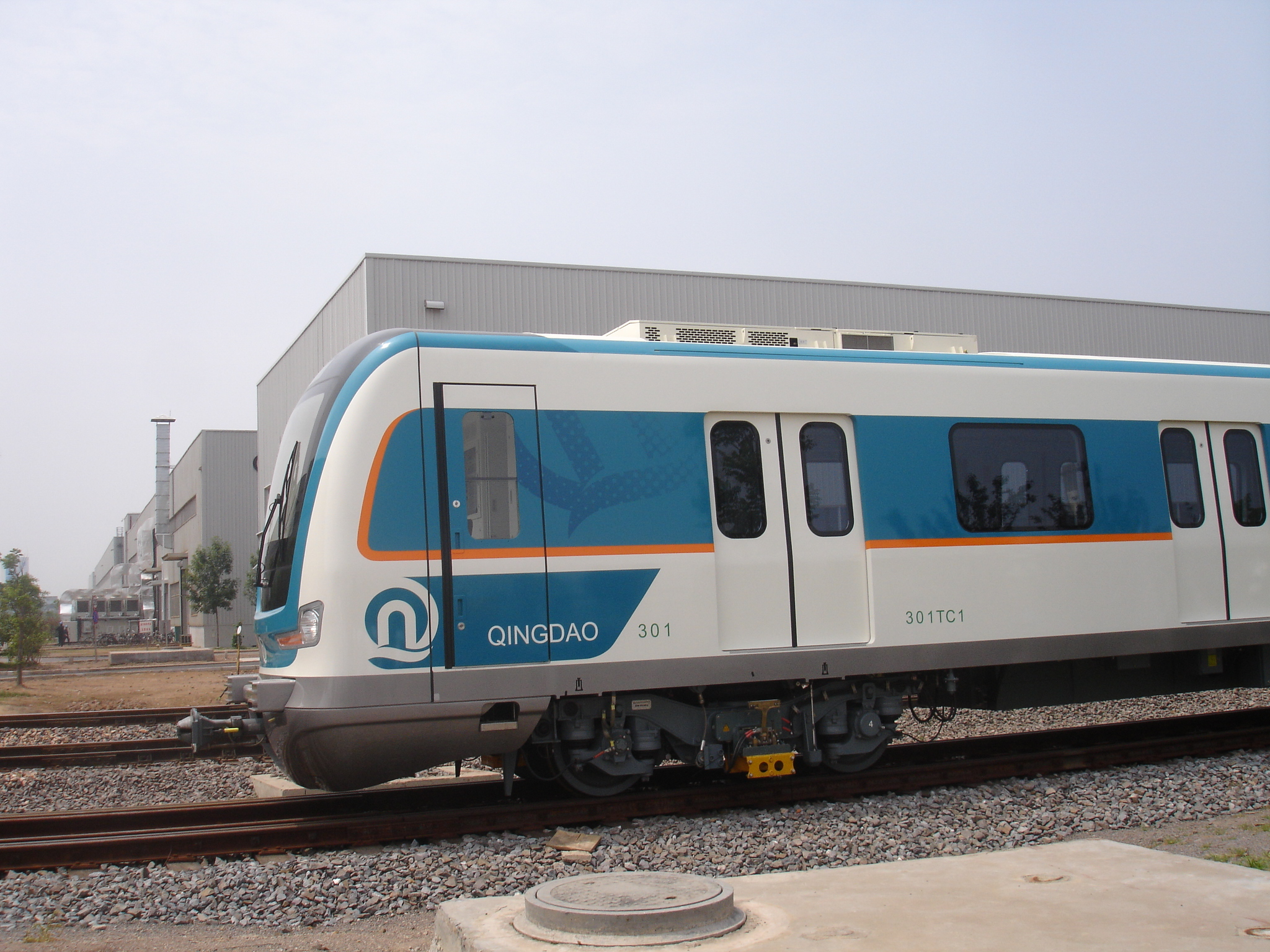
Line 3

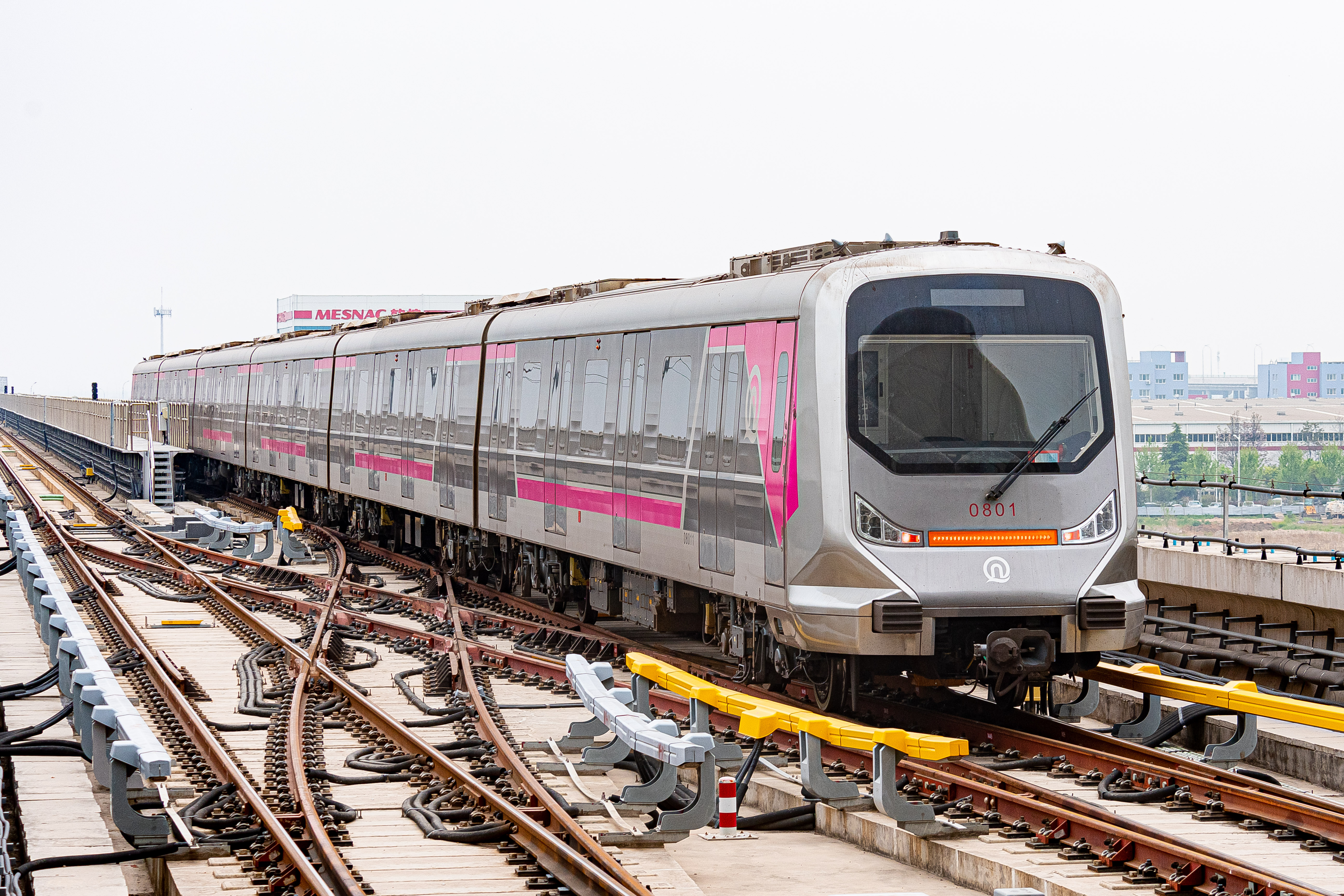
Line 8

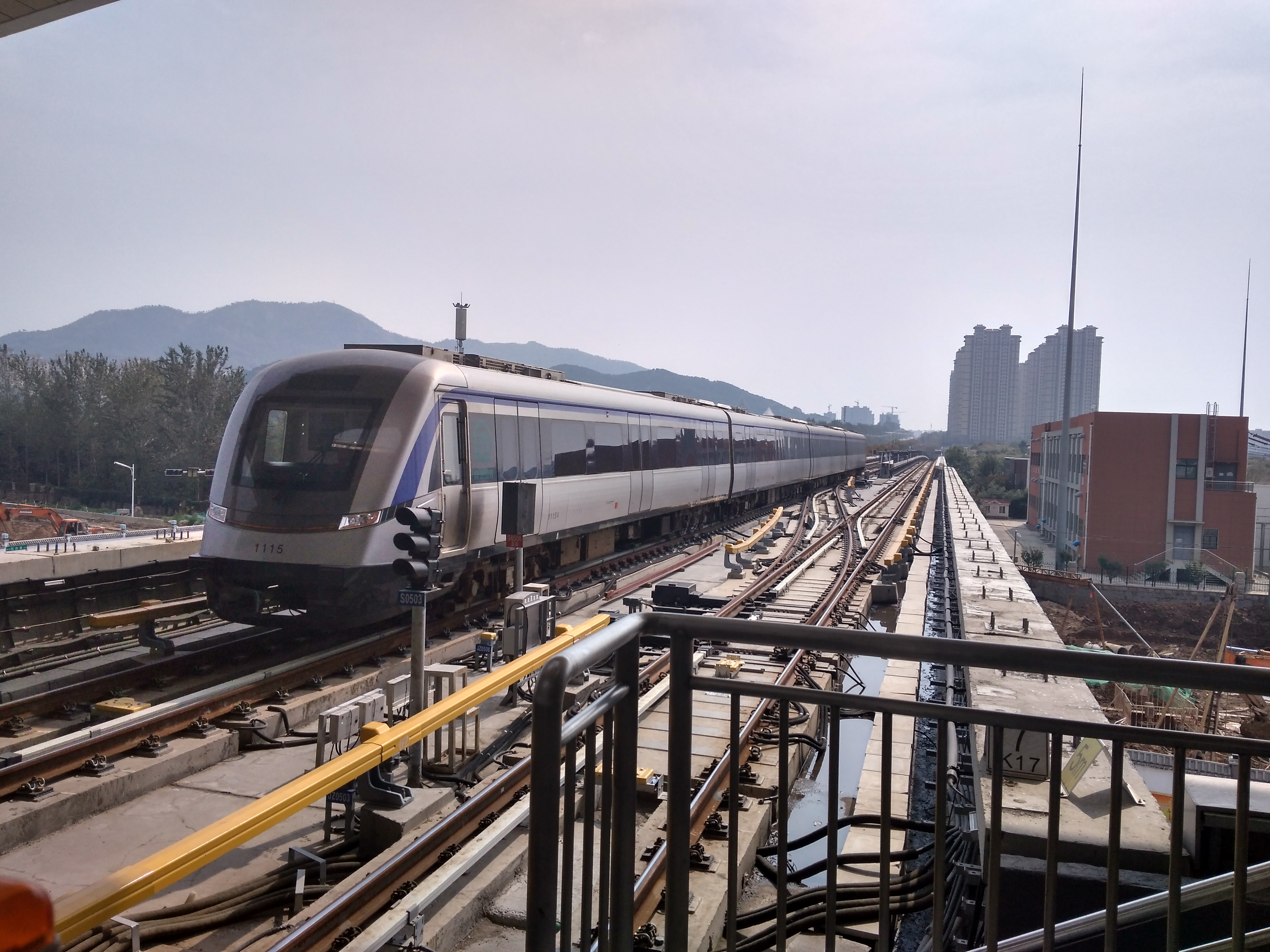
Oceantec Valley Line

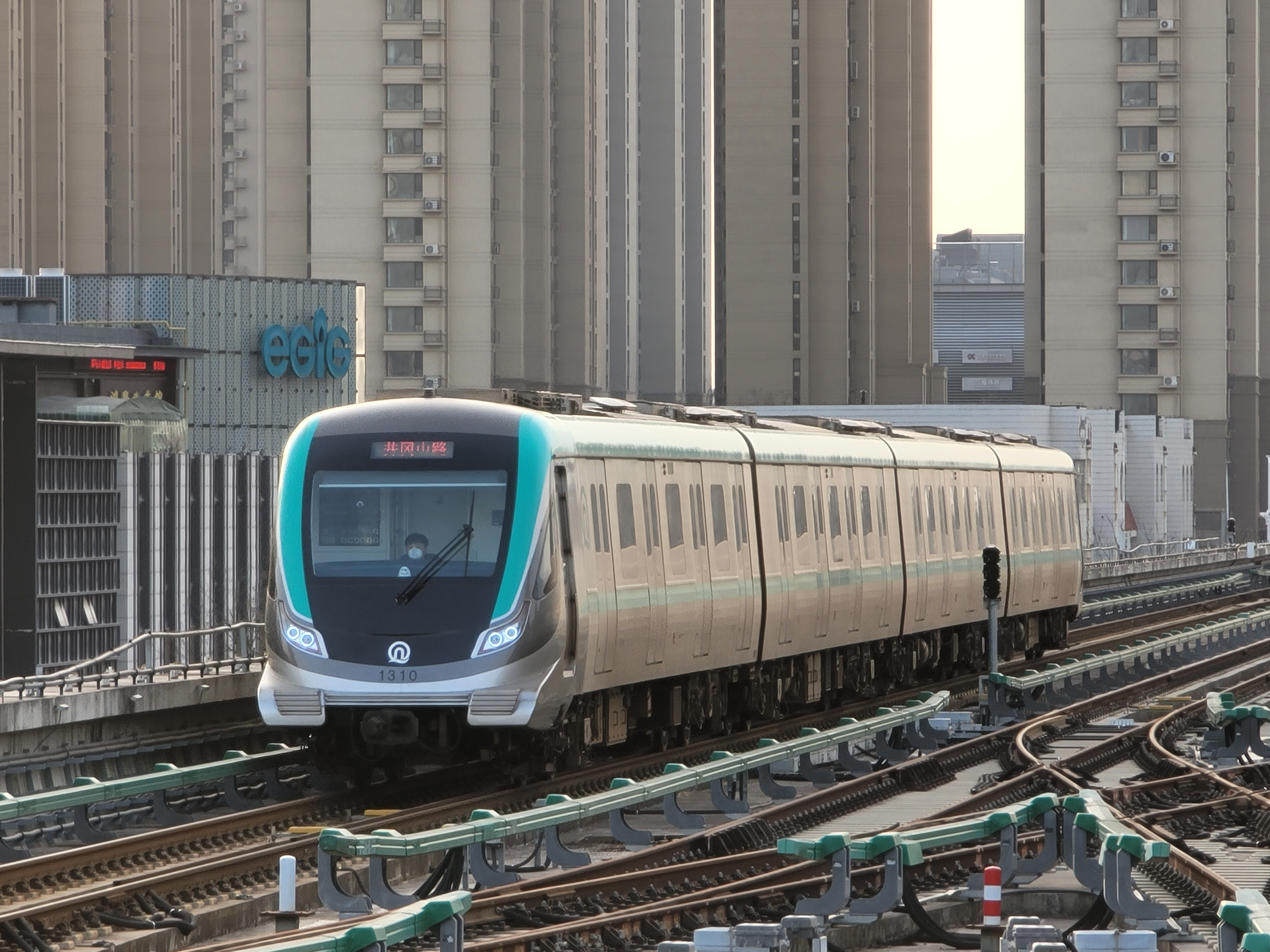
West Coast Line

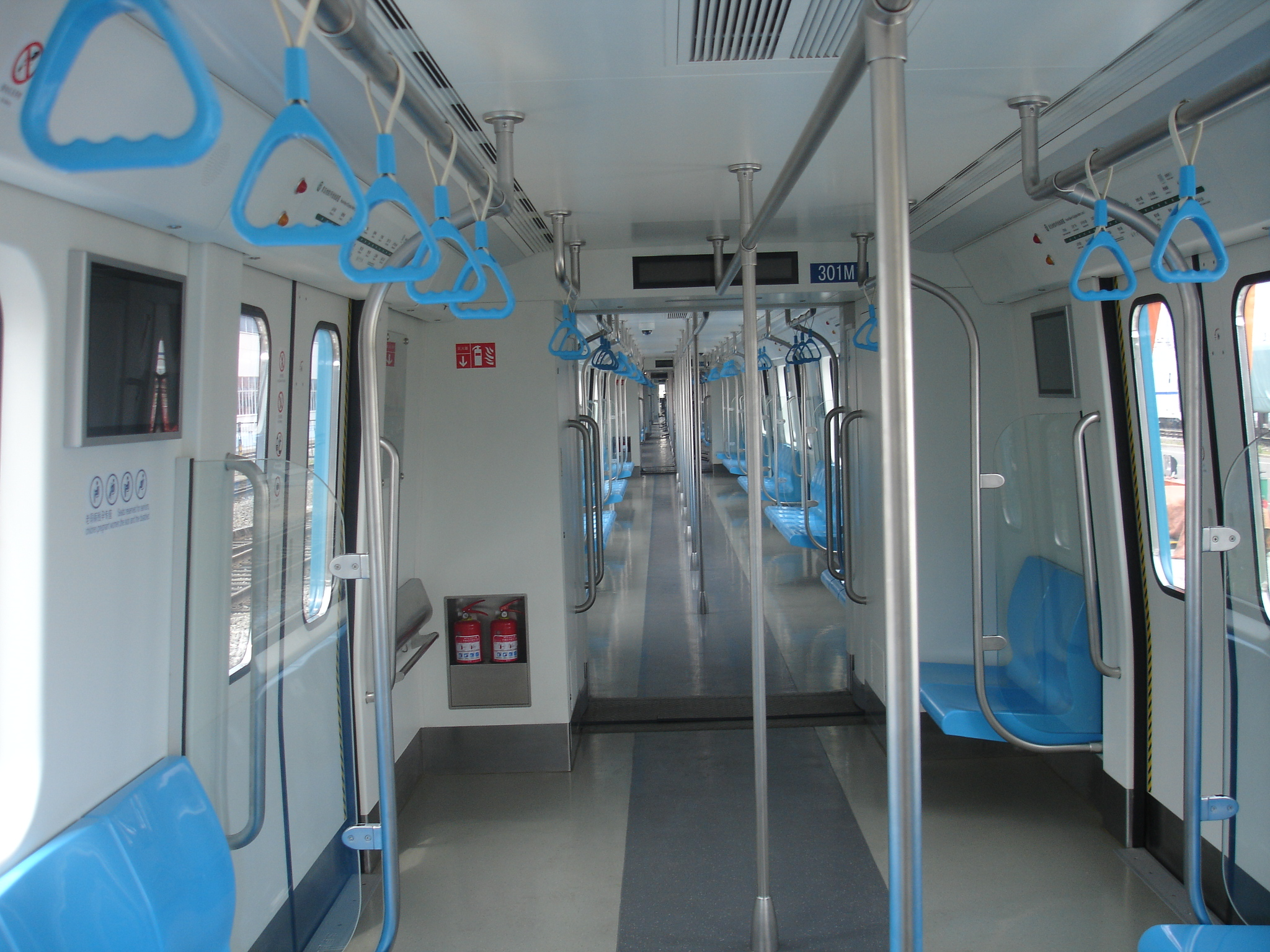
typical interior

== Ticketing ==
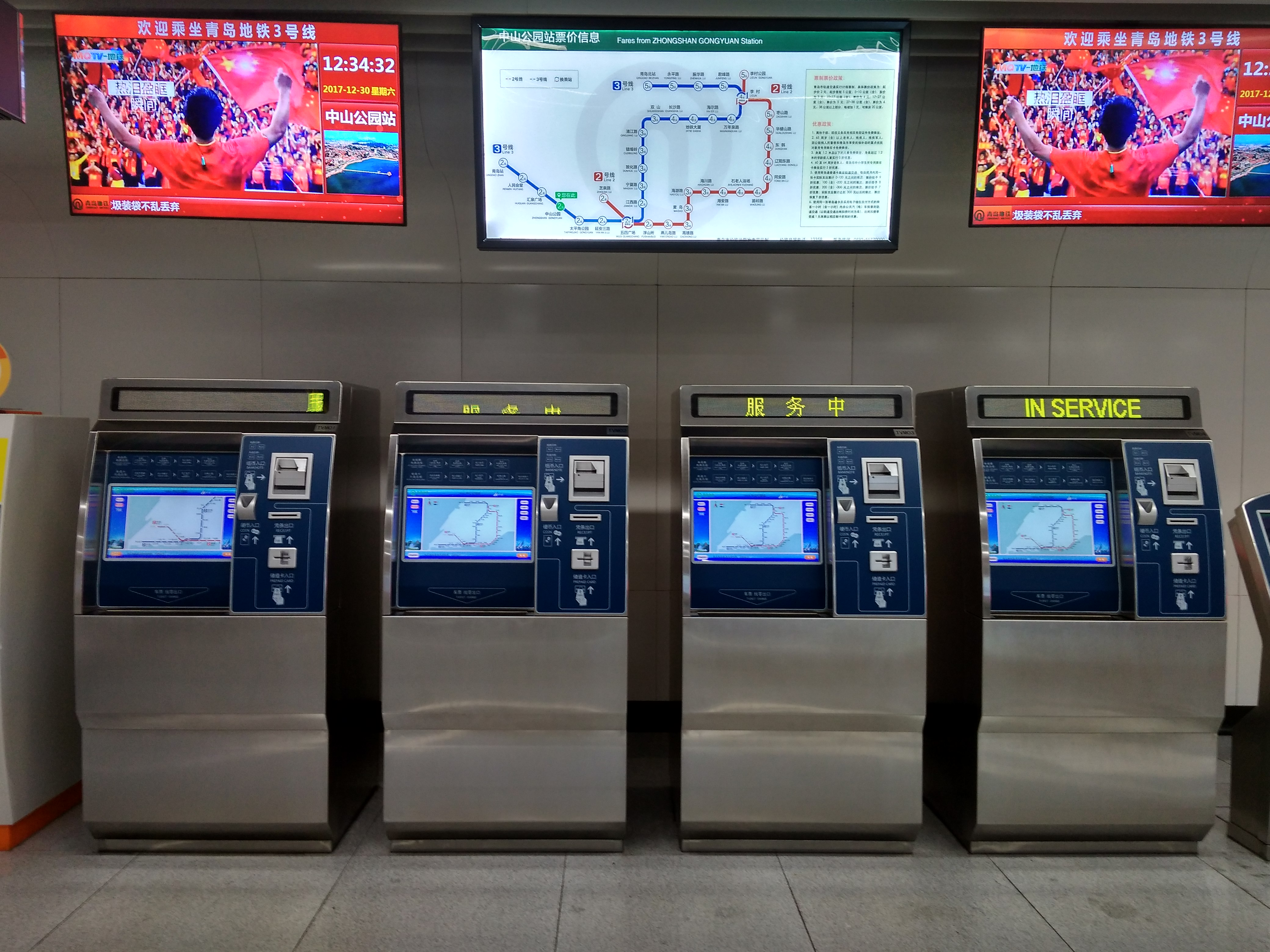
TVMs at Zhongshan Park

The Automated Fare Collection (AFC) system at Qingdao Metro stations includes several key machines:

Ticket Vending Machines (TVM): Located in the non-paid area of the station, these machines allow you to buy single-ride tickets, top-up stored-value cards, or collect pre-purchased tickets. You can pay with cash, mobile payment apps like Alipay or WeChat, or scan a QR code from the Qingdao Metro app.

Ticket Checking Machines (TCM): Also in the non-paid area, these machines let you check the type, validity, balance, and recent transactions of your ticket or card.

Automatic Gates (AGM): Positioned between the non-paid and paid areas, these gates require you to swipe your card or scan a code to enter or exit. At the exit, one-way tickets are collected, and fares are deducted for stored-value card users.

Staffed Service Machines (BOM): Located at the station service center, these machines allow staff to help with issues like ticket refunds, lost or invalid cards, overcharges, and other problems that can't be resolved by the TVMs.

Self-Service Terminals (STT): Also at the station service center, these terminals are for passengers inside the paid area to handle their own ticket-related tasks, such as card updates, balance inquiries, and resolving ticket issues.

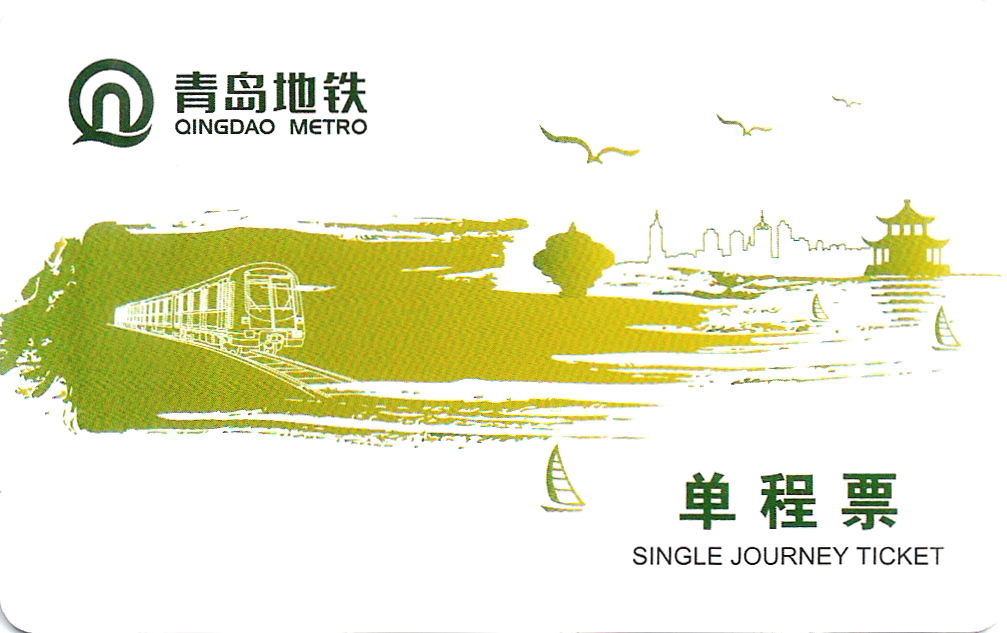
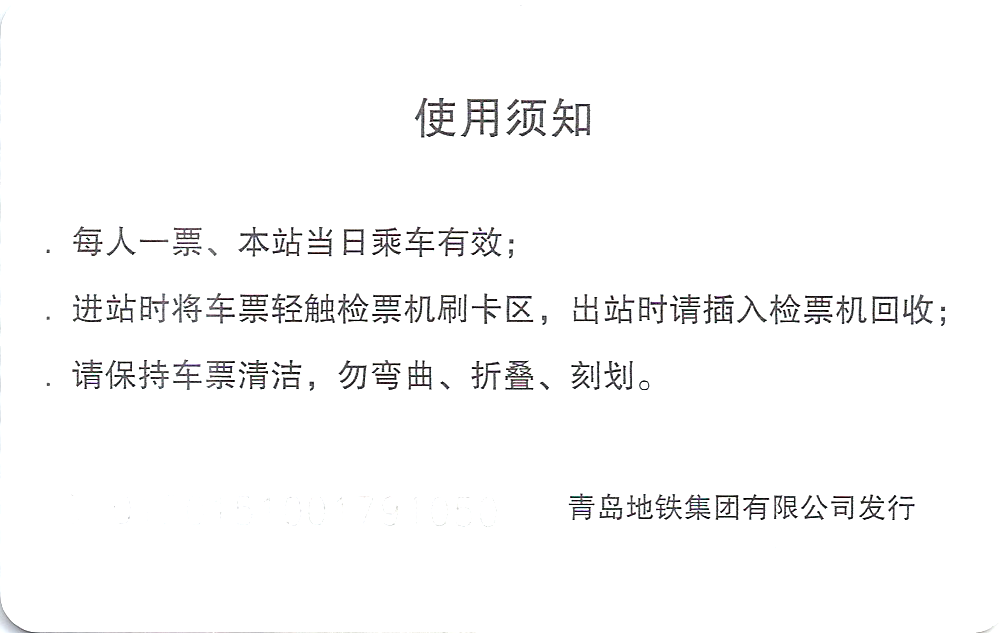
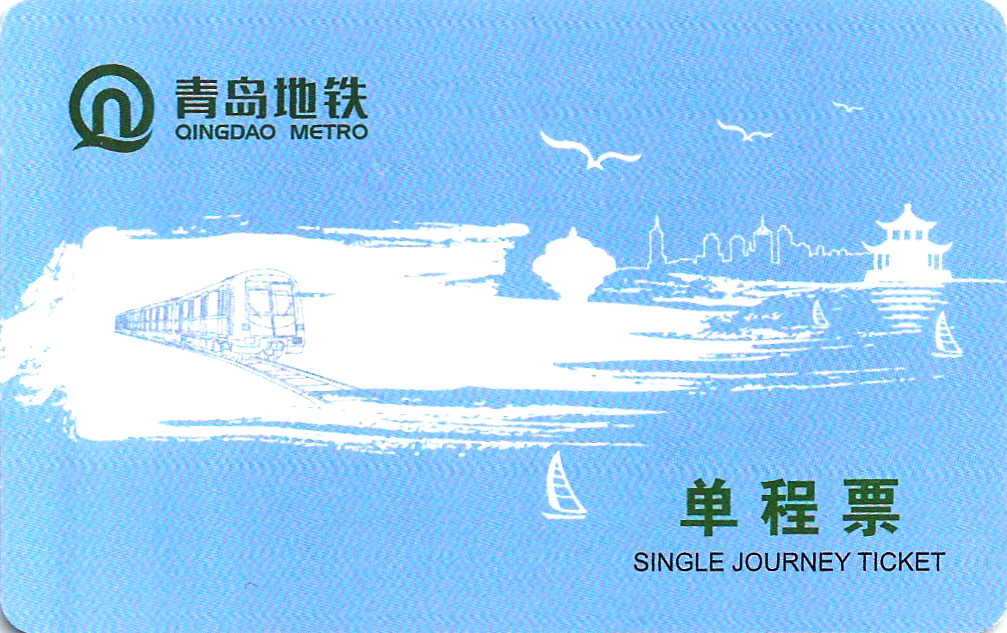
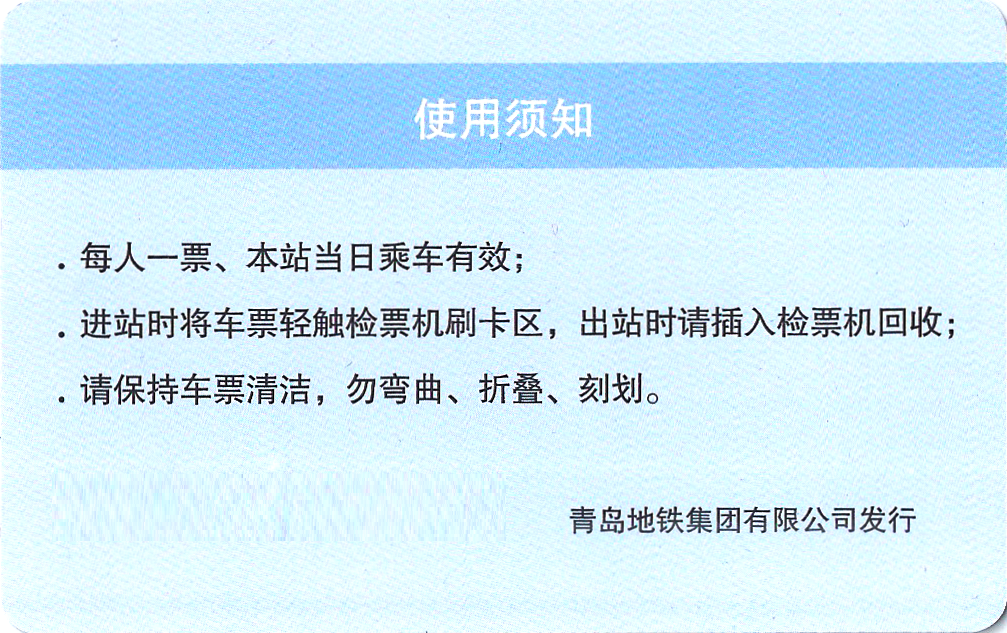
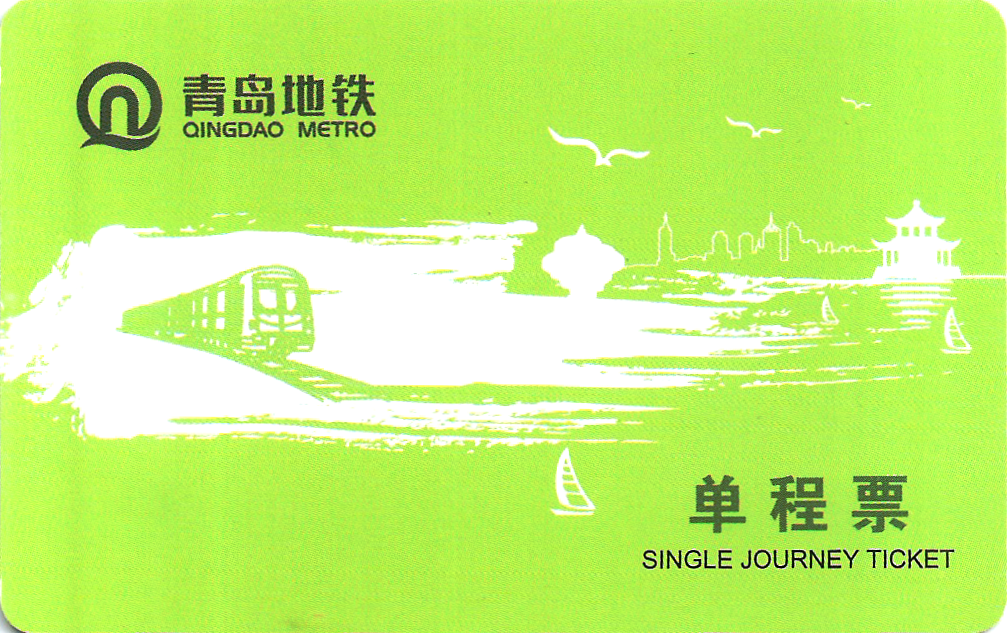
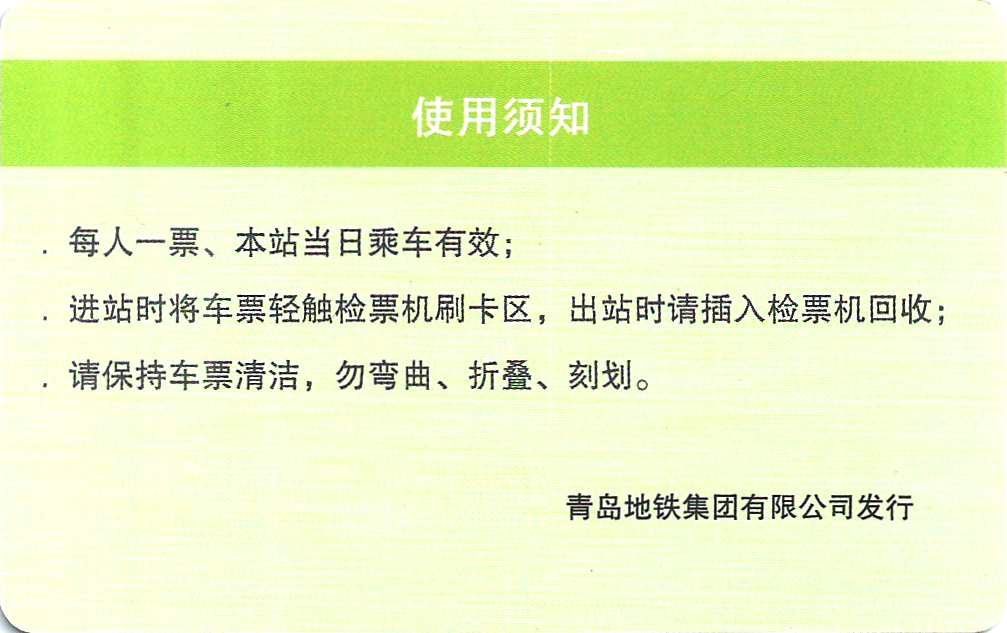
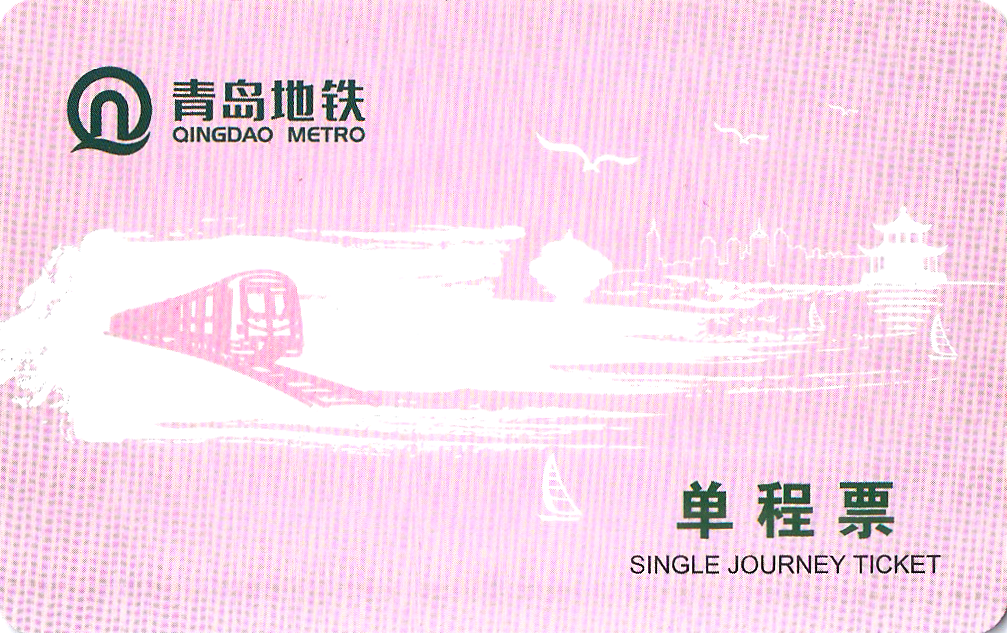
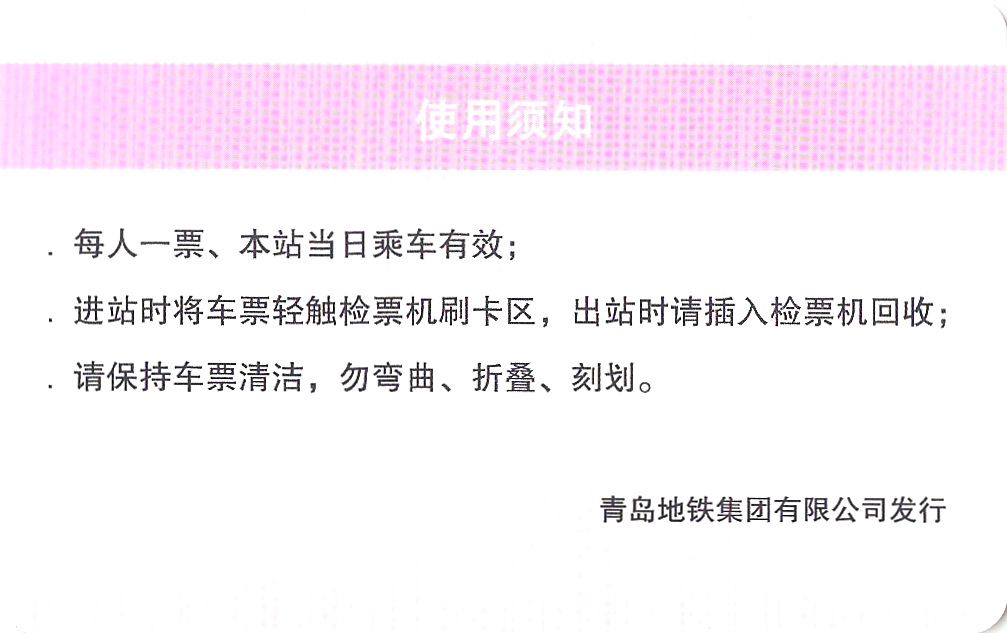
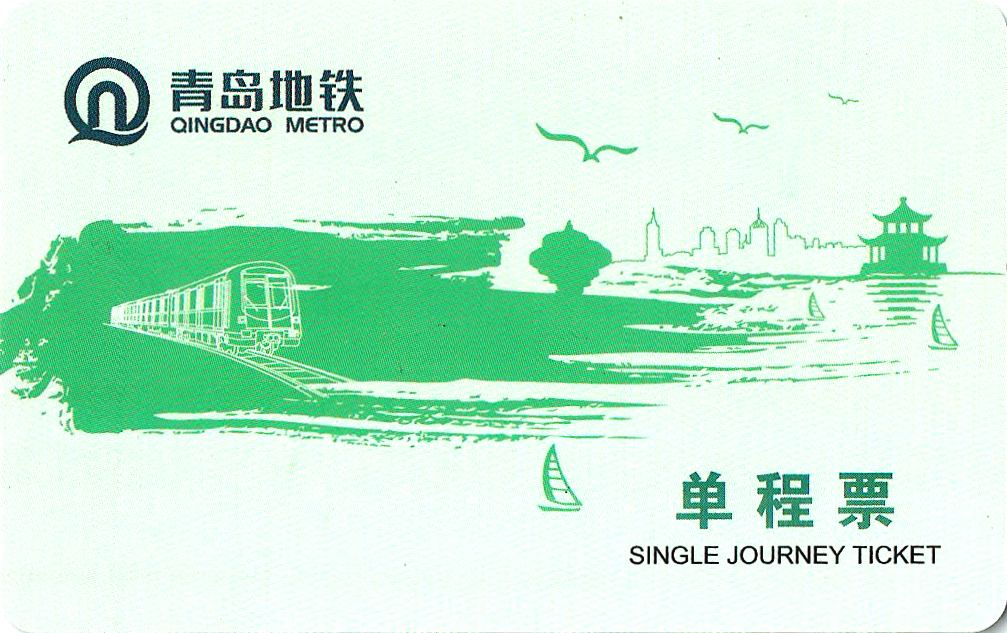
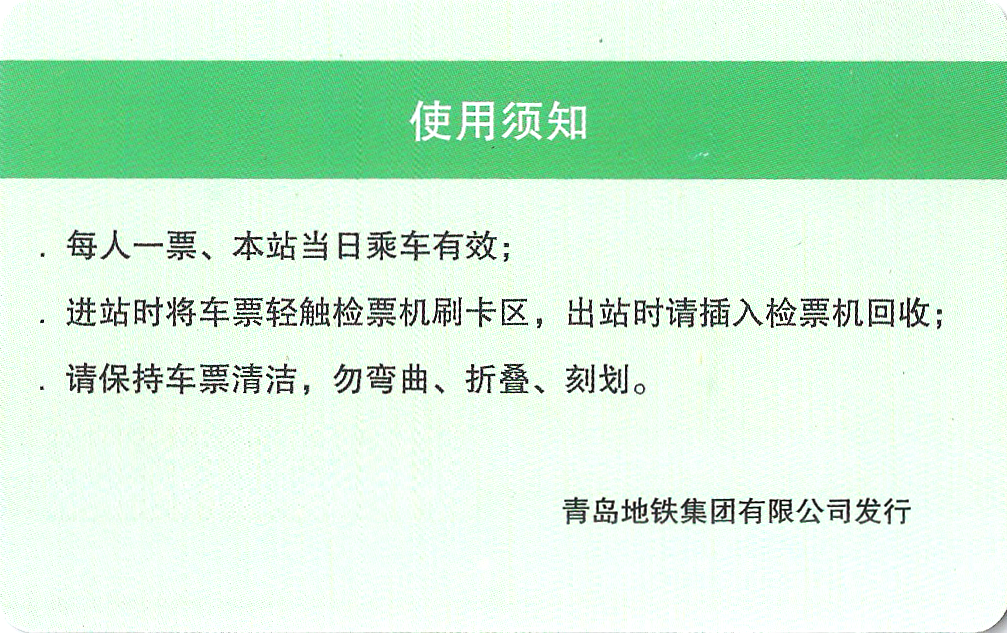
6 Types of one way tickets, front and back

== Ticket Fares ==
Qingdao Metro adopts mileage-based pricing. The starting fare is RMB 2 (excluding discounts). The starting mileage is 5 km; the fare is 3 yuan for 5~10 km; the fare is 4 yuan for 10~17 km; 17 ~27 km, the fare is 5 yuan; 27~38 km, the fare is 6 yuan; for every 1 yuan increase in fare above 38 km.

== Accidents and incidents ==
On April 13, 2018, the ground collapsed near the Haixin Bridge Station in the western section of Line 2 and there were no casualties.

On November 26, 2018, a partial detachment occurred during the 01-2 workspace jet operation of Line 8 B2, causing a worker to fall from the work platform and die after being sent to the hospital for rescue.

On December 20, 2018, a production accident occurred at a construction site on Line 4, killing one person.

On May 27, 2019, the construction section of the quicksand area of Line 4 collapsed, killing 5 people.

On February 20, 2023, at the Shilaoren Beach Station project site of Line 5, an accident occurred while repairing a rotary drilling rig, resulting in the death of a maintenance worker.

== See also ==
- List of metro systems
- Urban rail transit in China
