= Line 3 (Qingdao Metro) =

Metro line in Qingdao, China

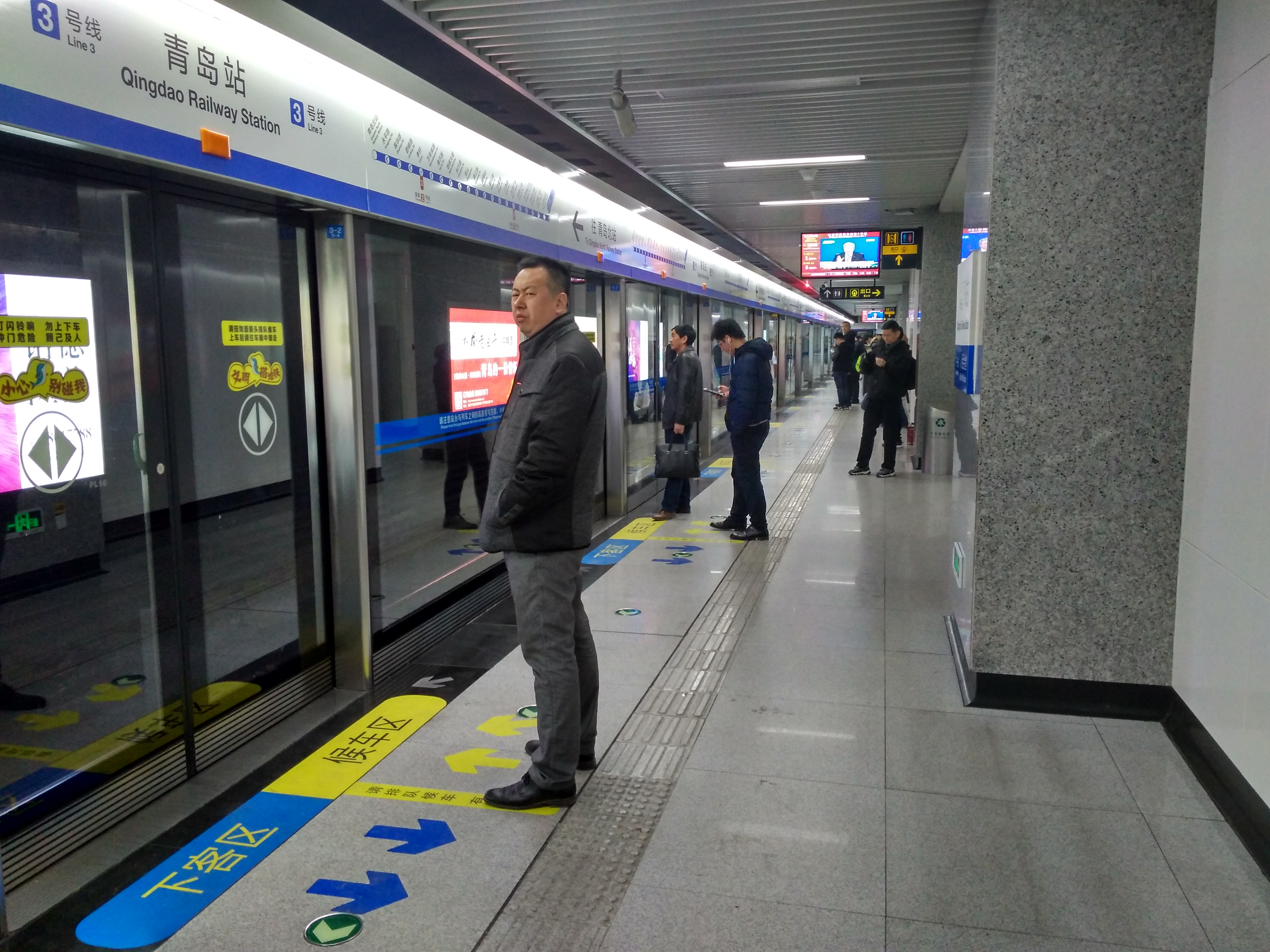
- Line 3 platform at Qingdao Railway Station

Overview
- Status: In operation
- Owner: Government of Qingdao
- Locale: Qingdao, China
- Termini: Qingdao Railway Station; Qingdao North Railway Station
- Stations: 22

Service
- Type: Rapid transit
- System: Qingdao Metro
- Services: 1
- Operator: Qingdao Metro Corporation
- Rolling stock: Chinese Type B1

History
- Opened: December 16, 2015; 10 years ago (North section); December 18, 2016; 9 years ago (South section)

Technical
- Line length: 24.8 km (15.41 mi)
- Number of tracks: 2
- Character: Underground
- Track gauge: 1,435 mm (4 ft 8 1/2 in)

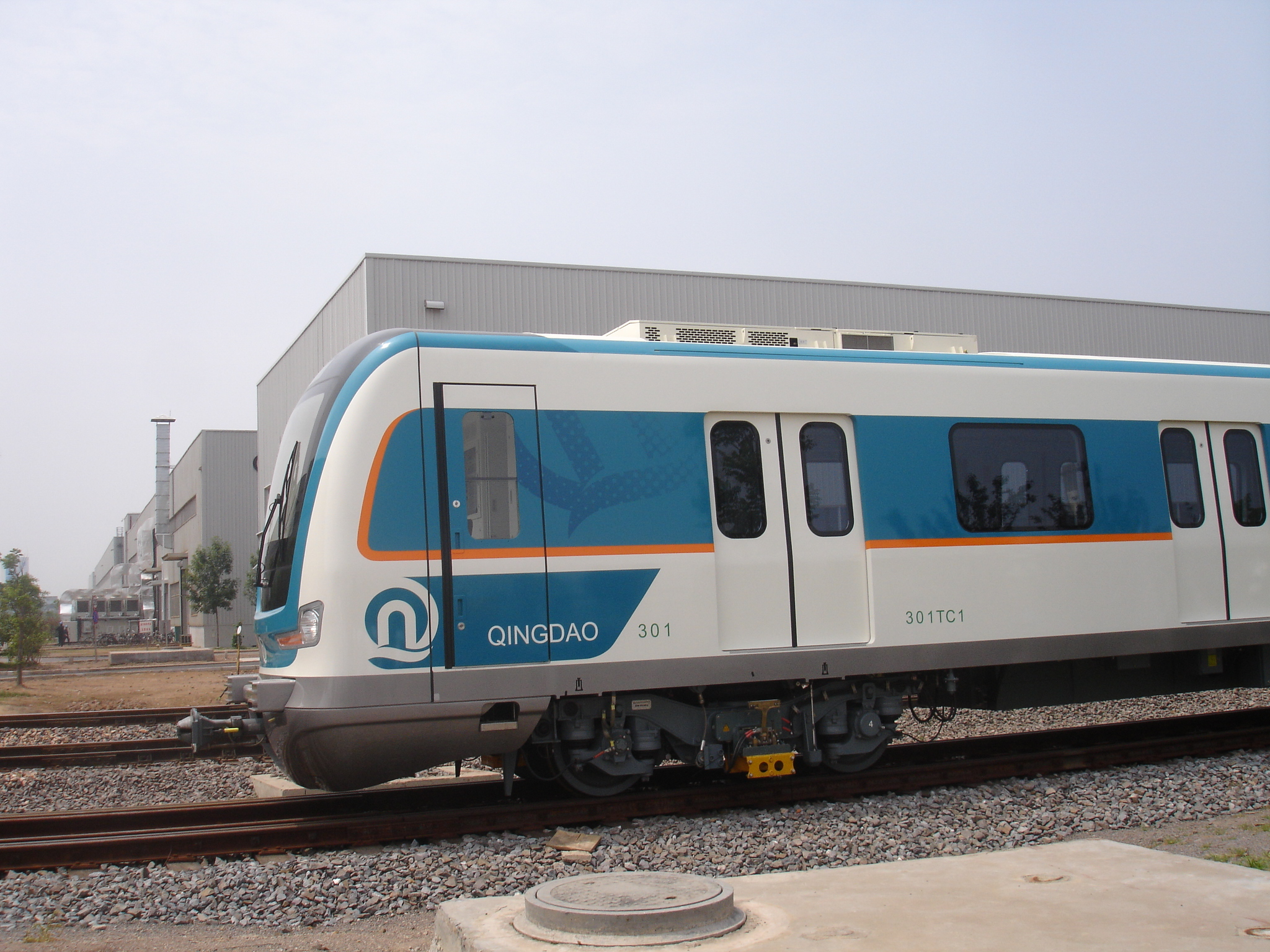
Line 3 train

Line 3 of Qingdao Metro (Chinese: 青岛地铁3号线) is an underground metro line in Qingdao. The north section began operation on December 16, 2015, and the south section began operation on December 18, 2016.

== Opening timeline ==
Segment	Commencement	Length	Station(s)	Name
Qingdao North Railway Station — Shuangshan	16 December 2015	12.0 km (7.46 mi)	10	Phase 1 (northern section)
Shuangshan — Qingdao Railway Station	18 December 2016	12.8 km (7.95 mi)	12	Phase 1 (southern section)

== Stations ==
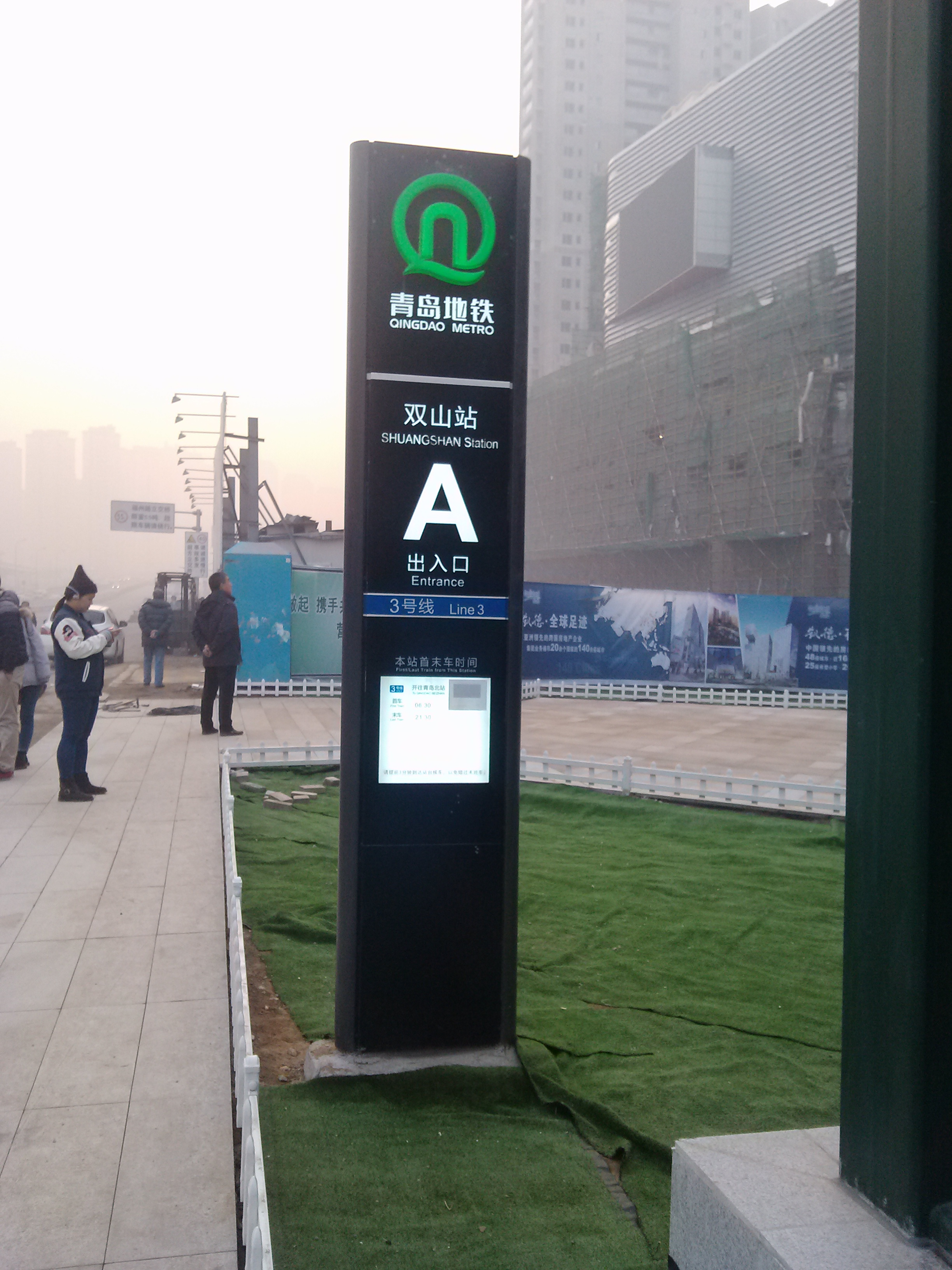
Shuangshan station

station name		Connections	Distance km		Location
English	Chinese	Connections	Distance km		Location
Qingdao Railway Station	青岛站	1 QDK	0.000	0.000	Shinan
Hall of the People	人民会堂	4	1.410	1.410	Shinan
Huiquan Square	汇泉广场		1.278	2.688	Shinan
Zhongshan Park	中山公园		0.875	3.563	Shinan
Taipingjiao Park	太平角公园		1.021	4.584	Shinan
Yan'an 3rd Road	延安三路		1.496	6.080	Shinan
May 4th Square	五四广场	2 8	0.755	6.835	Shinan
Jiangxi Road	江西路	5	1.551	6.386	Shinan
Ningxia Road	宁夏路		0.917	9.303	Shinan
Dunhua Road	敦化路		0.778	10.081	Shibei / Shinan
Cuobuling	错埠岭	4	0.801	10.882	Shibei
Qingjiang Road	清江路		1.389	12.271	Shibei
Shuangshan	双山		1.251	13.522	Shibei
Changsha Road	长沙路	7	0.851	14.373	Shibei
Metro Building	地铁大厦		1.469	15.842	Laoshan / Shibei
Hai'er Road	海尔路		1.153	16.995	Laoshan
Wannianquan Road	万年泉路		1.376	18.371	Licang
Licun	李村	2	1.316	19.687	Licang
Junfeng Road	君峰路		1.055	20.742	Licang
Zhenhua Road	振华路	7	0.966	21.708	Licang
Yongping Road	永平路		1.227	22.935	Licang
Qingdao North Railway Station	青岛北站	1 8 QR QHK	1.537	24.472	Licang
