= Changsha Road station =

Qingdao Metro station

Changsha Road 长沙路
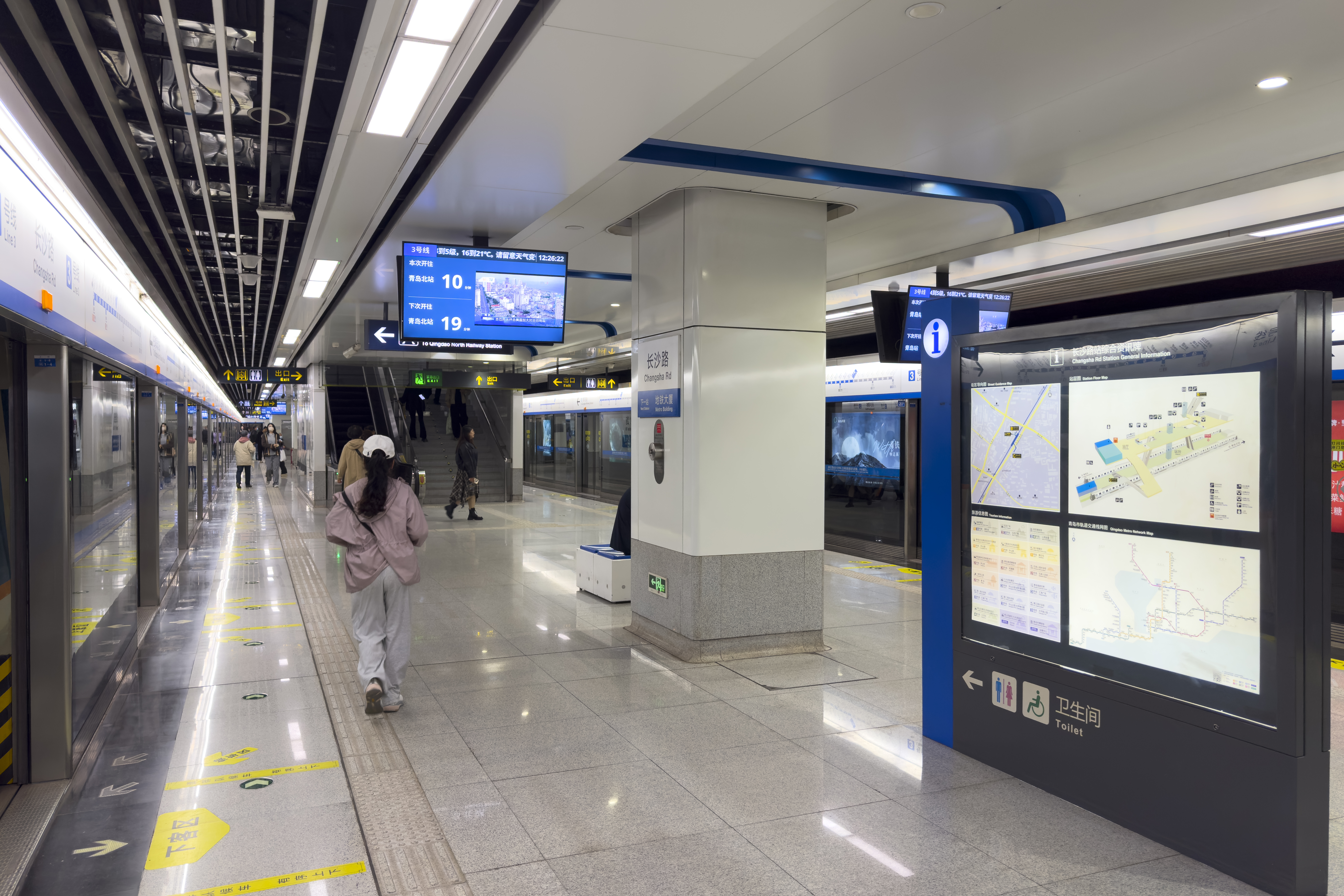

General information
- Location: Shibei District, Qingdao, Shandong; China
- Coordinates: 36.12028°N 120.39722°E
- Operator: Qingdao Metro Corporation
- Line: Line 3
- Platforms: 2 (1 island platform)

History
- Opened: 16 December 2015; 10 years ago

Services
Preceding station	Qingdao Metro	Following station
Shuangshan towards Qingdao Railway Station	Line 3	Metro building towards Qingdao North Railway Station
Location

Changsha Road (Chinese: 长沙路) is a station of the Qingdao Metro on Line 3, which opened on December 16, 2015.
