= Qingjiang Road station =

Qingdao Metro station

Qingjiang Road 清江路
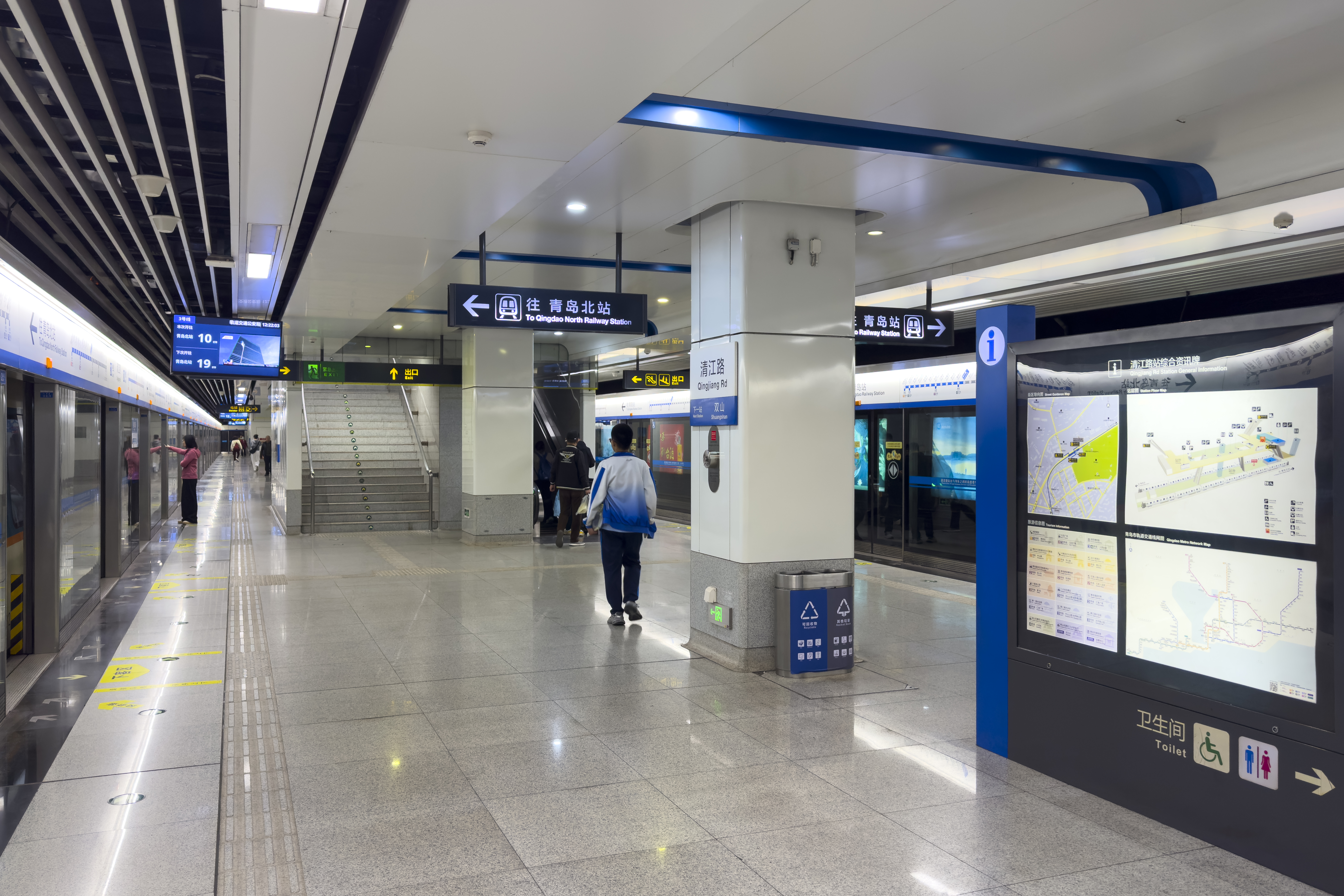

General information
- Location: Shibei District, Qingdao, Shandong; China
- Coordinates: 36.11°N 120.38°E
- Operator: Qingdao Metro Corporation
- Line: Line 3
- Platforms: 2 (1 island platform)

History
- Opened: 18 December 2016; 9 years ago

Services
Preceding station	Qingdao Metro	Following station
Cuobuling towards Qingdao Railway Station	Line 3	Shuangshan towards Qingdao North Railway Station
Location

Qingjiang Road (Chinese: 清江路) is a station on Line 3 of the Qingdao Metro. It opened on 18 December 2016.

== Gallery ==
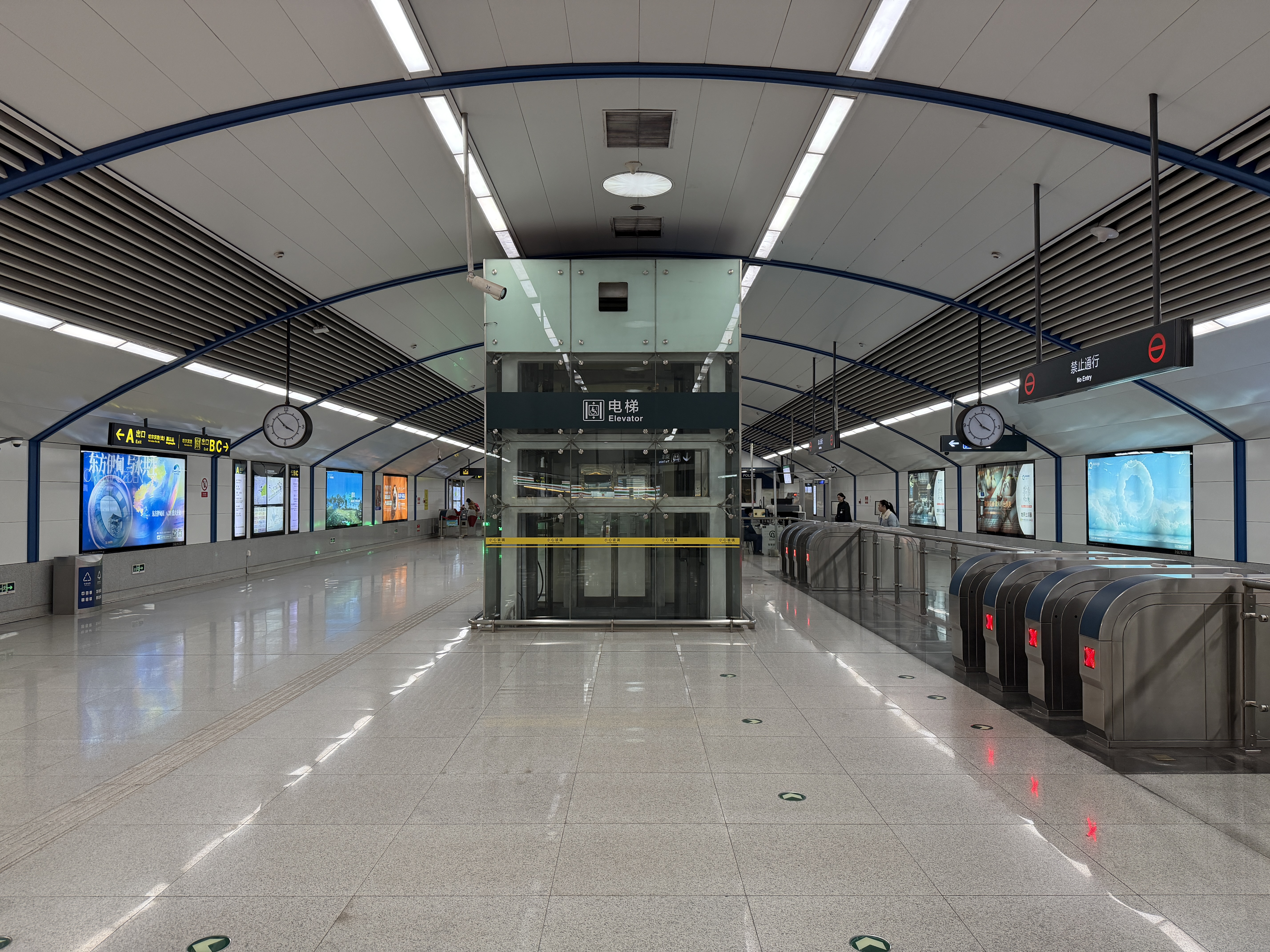
Concourse

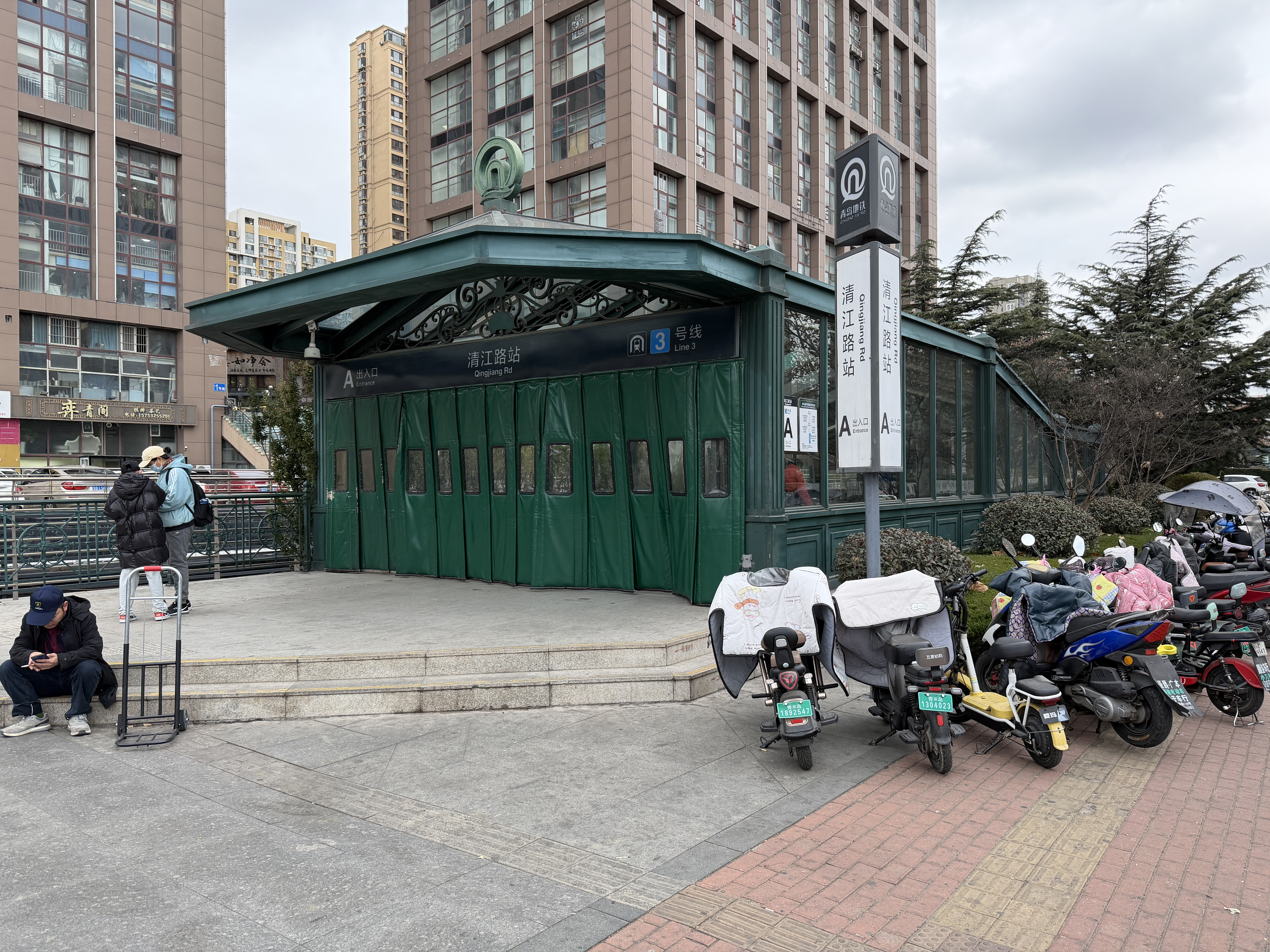
Entrance A

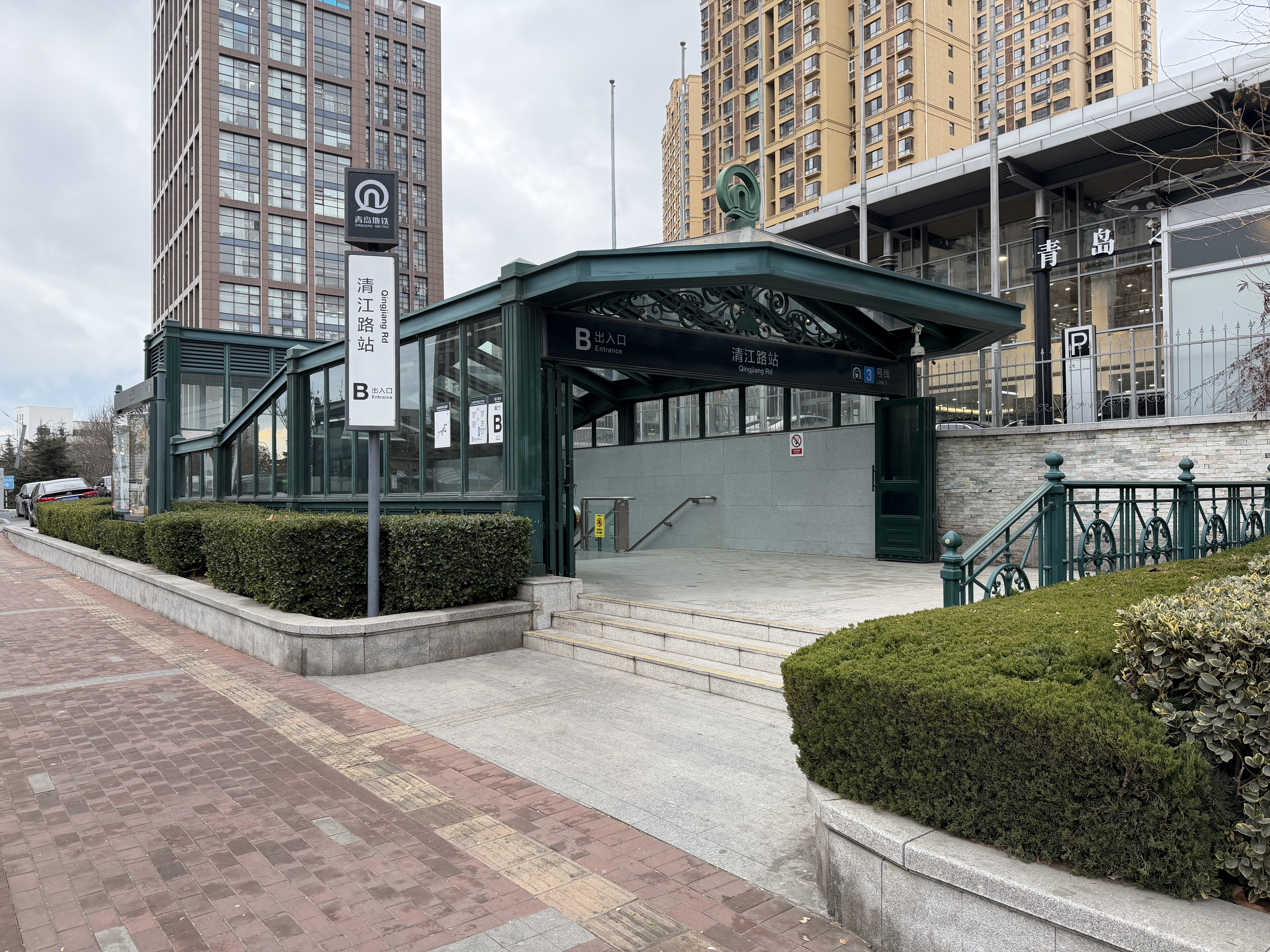
Entrance B

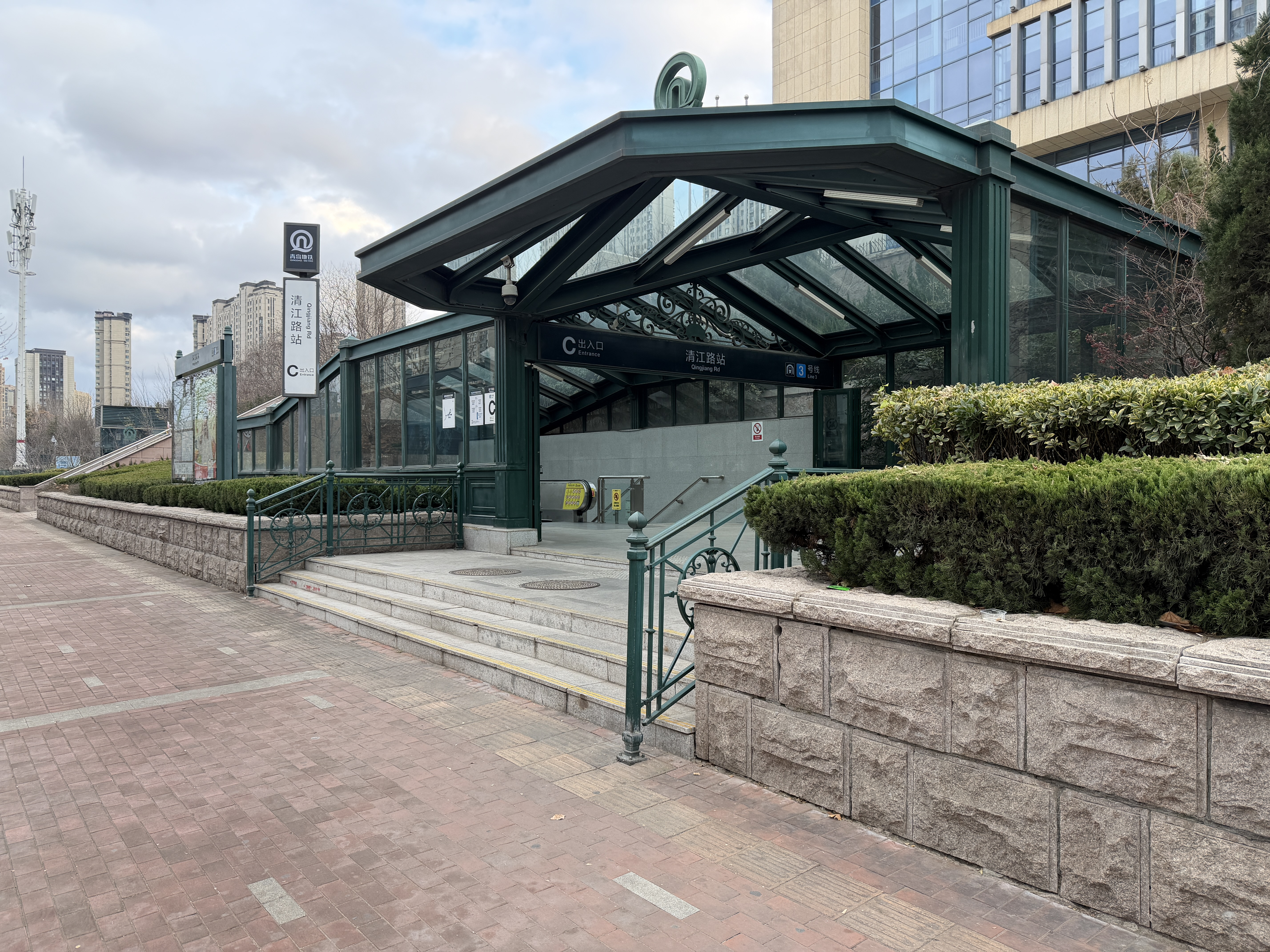
Entrance C
