= Cuobuling station =

Qingdao Metro station

Cuobuling 错埠岭
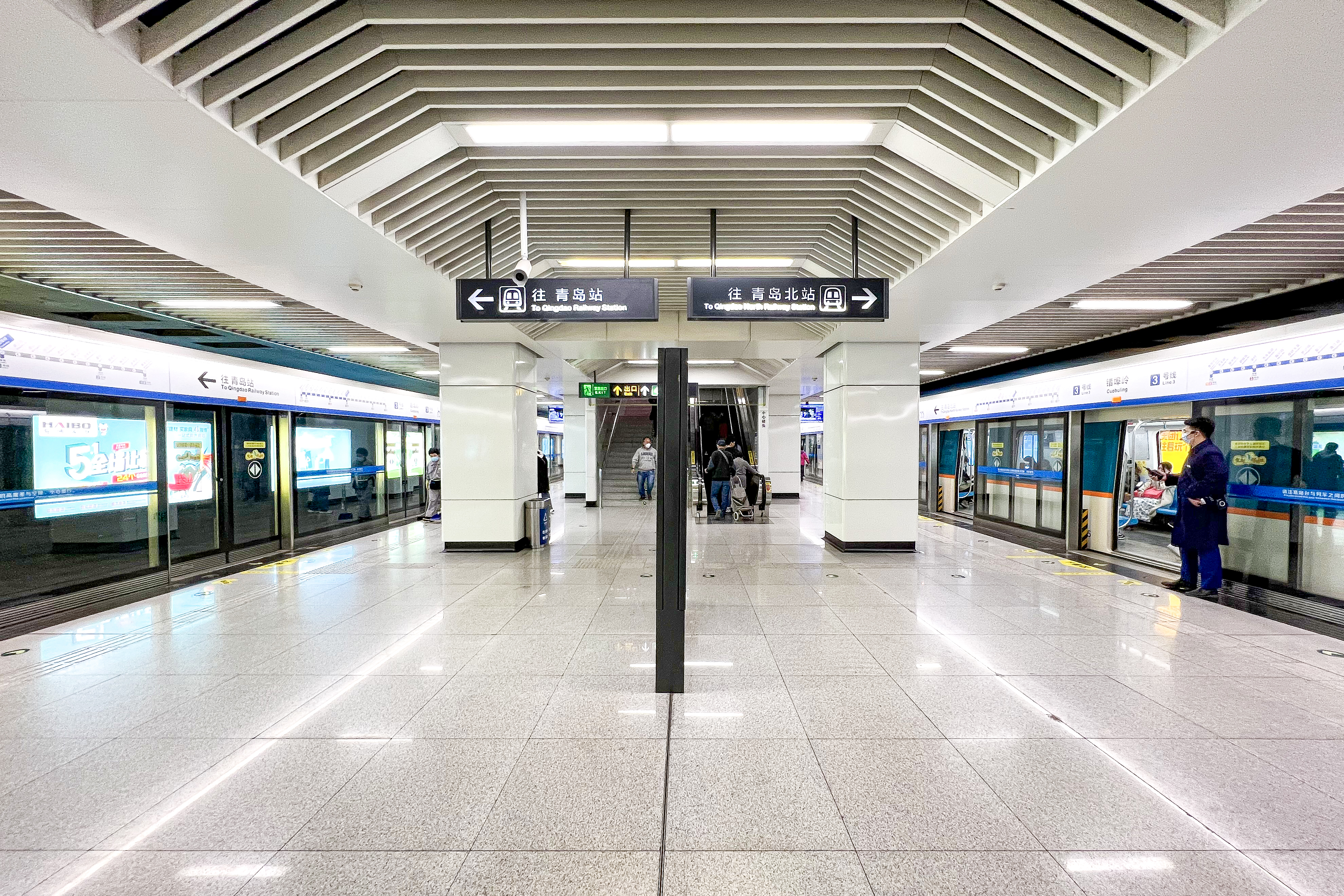
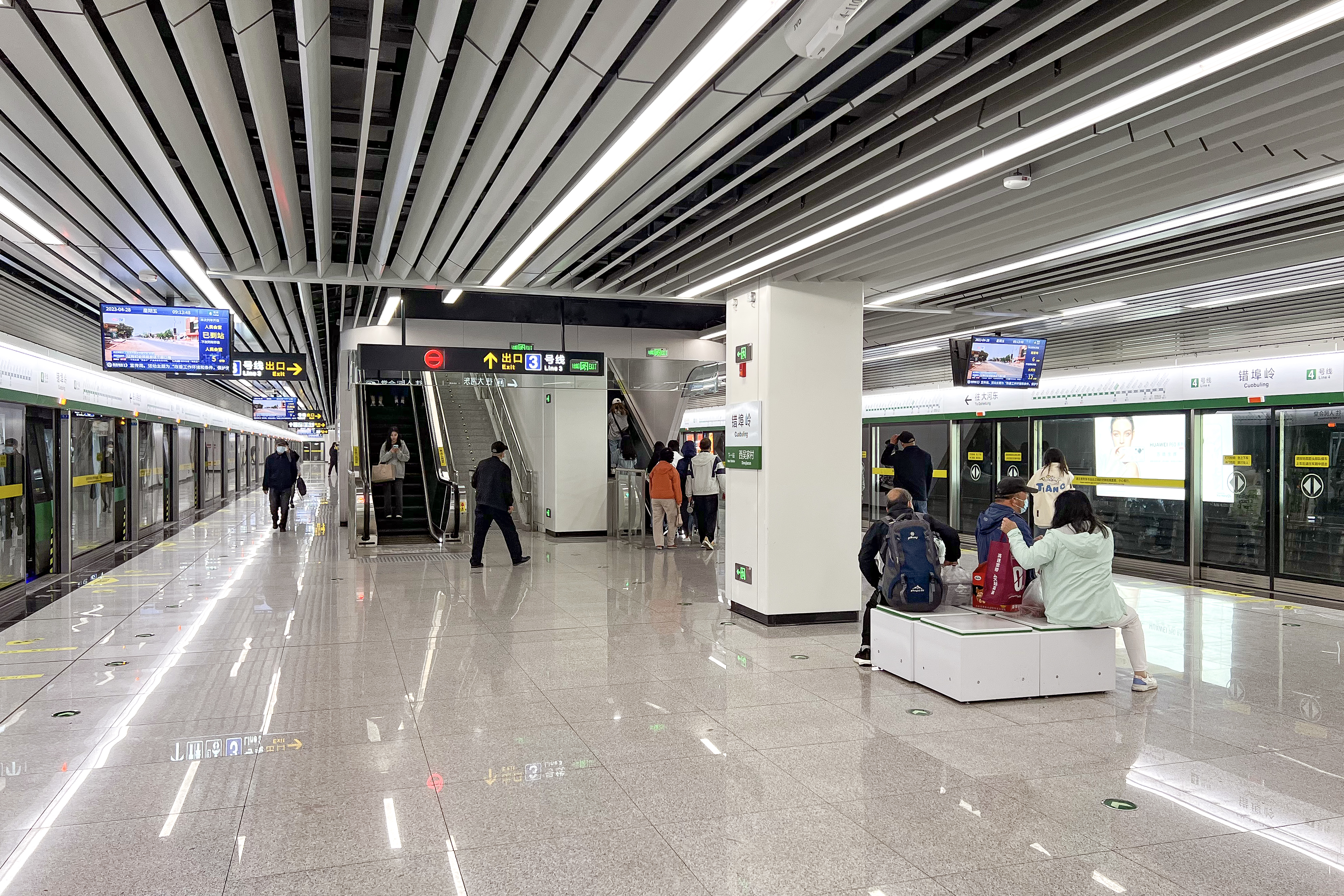
- Line 3 platform Line 4 platform

General information
- Location: Shibei District, Qingdao, Shandong; China
- Operator: Qingdao Metro Corporation
- Lines: Line 3 Line 4
- Platforms: 4 (2 island platforms)

History
- Opened: 18 December 2016; 9 years ago

Services
Preceding station	Qingdao Metro	Following station
Dunhua Road towards Qingdao Railway Station	Line 3	Qingjiang Road towards Qingdao North Railway Station
Xiwujiacun towards Hall of the People	Line 4	Fuliao Flyover towards Dahedong
Location

Cuobuling (Chinese: 错埠岭) is a station on Line 3 and Line 4 of the Qingdao Metro. It opened on 18 December 2016.
