= Shuangshan station =

Qingdao Metro station

Coordinates: 36.1140°N 120.3920°E

Shuangshan 双山
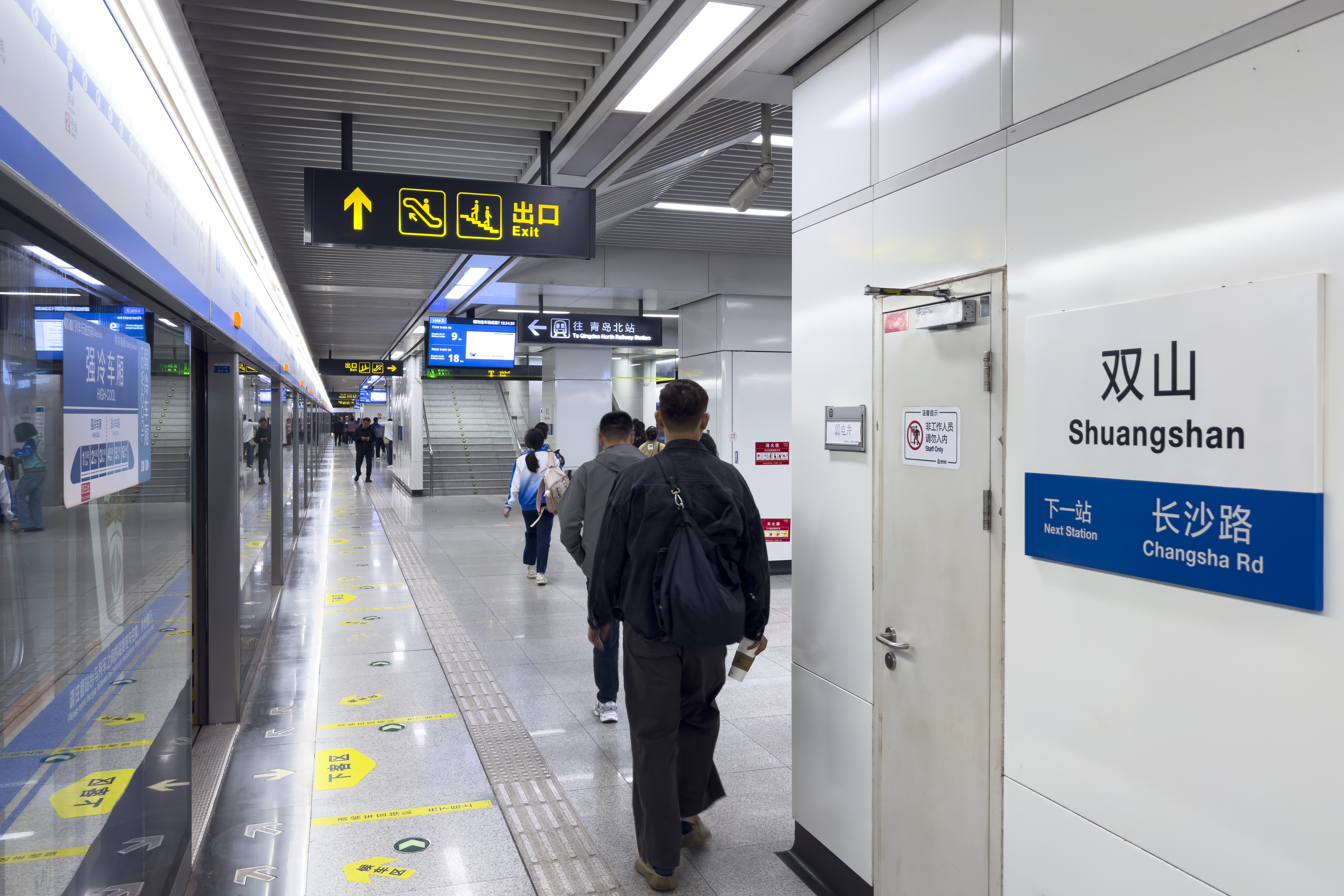

General information
- Location: Shibei District, Qingdao, Shandong; China
- Operator: Qingdao Metro Corporation
- Line: Line 3
- Platforms: 2 (1 island platform)

History
- Opened: 16 December 2015; 10 years ago

Services
Preceding station	Qingdao Metro	Following station
Qingjiang Road towards Qingdao Railway Station	Line 3	Changsha Road towards Qingdao North Railway Station
Location

Shuangshan (Chinese: 双山) is a station on Line 3 of the Qingdao Metro. It opened on 16 December 2015.
