= Metro Building station =

Qingdao Metro station

Metro Building 地铁大厦
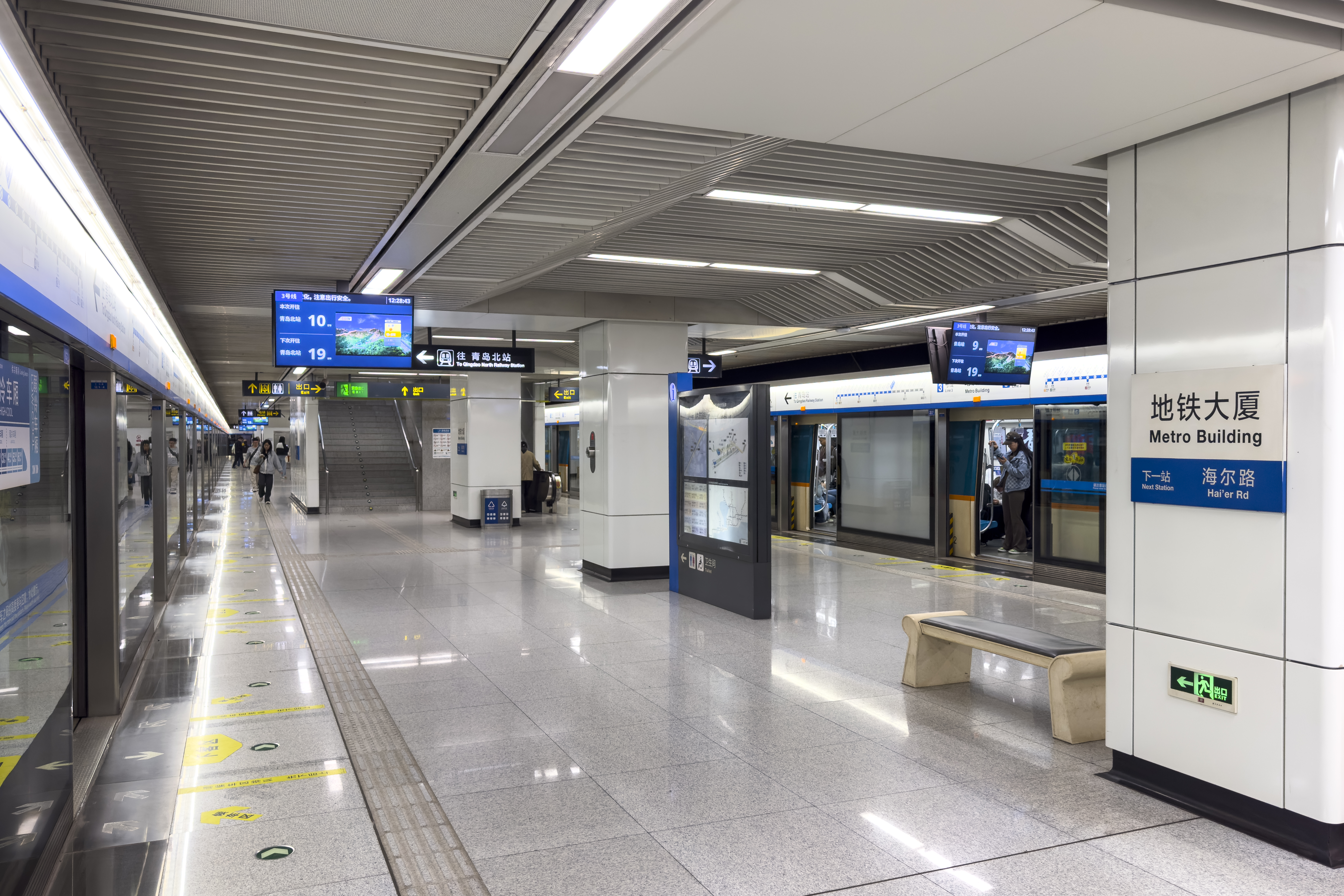
- Line 3 platform

General information
- Location: Heilongjiang South Road × Changning Road; Shibei District, Qingdao, Shandong; China
- Coordinates: 36°08′N 120°25′E
- Operated by: Qingdao Metro Corporation
- Line: Line 3
- Platforms: 2 (1 island platform)

History
- Opened: 16 December 2015; 10 years ago

Services
| Preceding station | Qingdao Metro | Following station |
|---|---|---|
| Changsha Rd towards Qingdao Railway Station | Line 3 | Hai'er Rd towards Qingdao North Railway Station |
Location

Metro Building, formerly known as Ditie Dasha (simplified Chinese: 地铁大厦; traditional Chinese: 地鐵大廈) is a station of the Qingdao Metro on Line 3, which opened on 16 December 2015.
