= Yan'an 3rd Road station =

Qingdao Metro station

Yan'an 3rd Road 延安三路
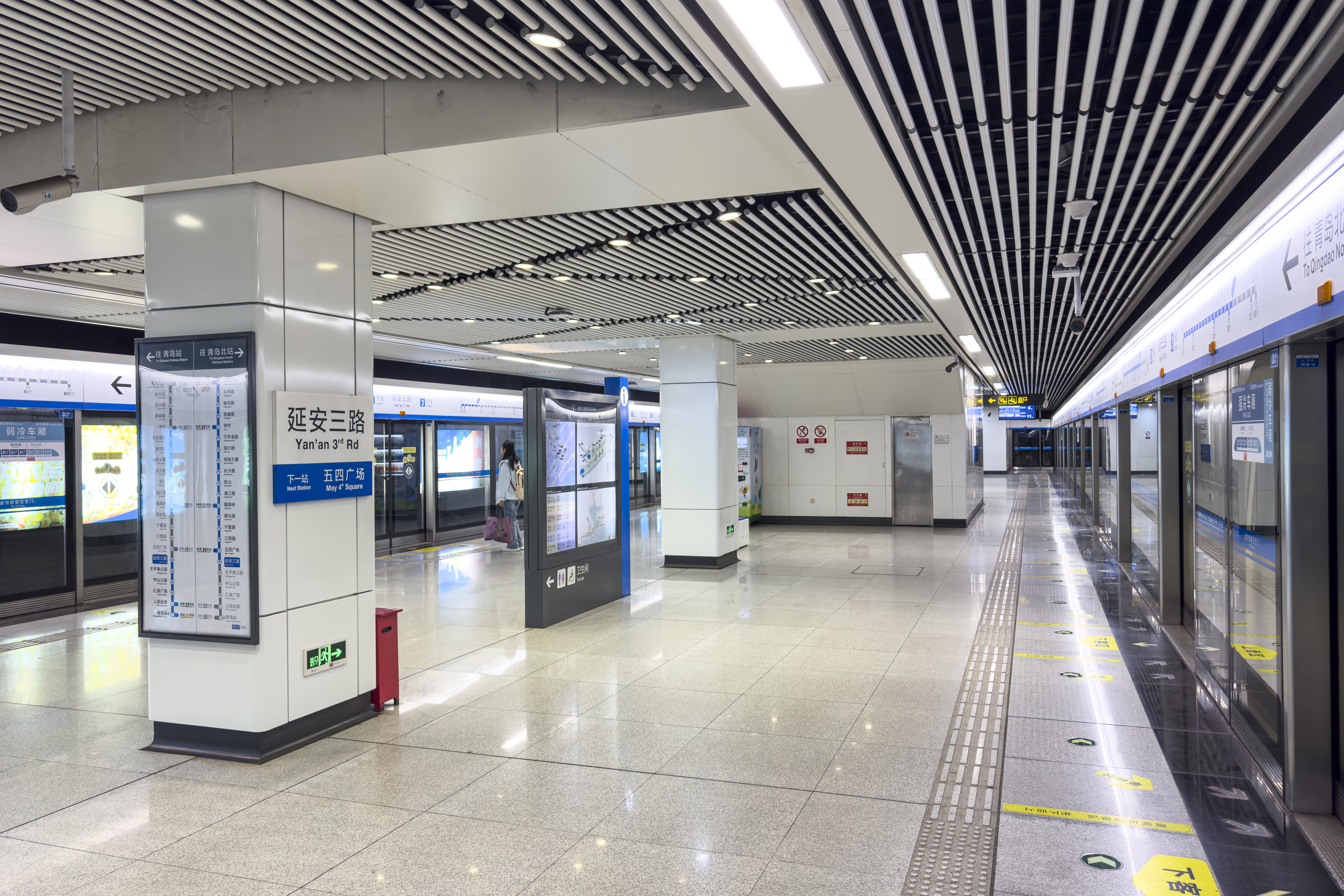

General information
- Location: Shinan District, Qingdao, Shandong; China
- Coordinates: 36.0607°N 120.3689°E
- Operator: Qingdao Metro Corporation
- Line: Line 3
- Platforms: 2 (1 island platform)

History
- Opened: 18 December 2016; 9 years ago

Services
Preceding station	Qingdao Metro	Following station
Taipingjiao Park|Taipingjiao Park (Yiliao) towards Qingdao Railway Station	Line 3	May 4th Square towards Qingdao North Railway Station
Location

Yan'an 3rd Road, formerly known as Yan'an 3 Lu (Chinese: 延安三路) is a station on Line 3 of the Qingdao Metro. It opened on 18 December 2016.

== Gallery ==
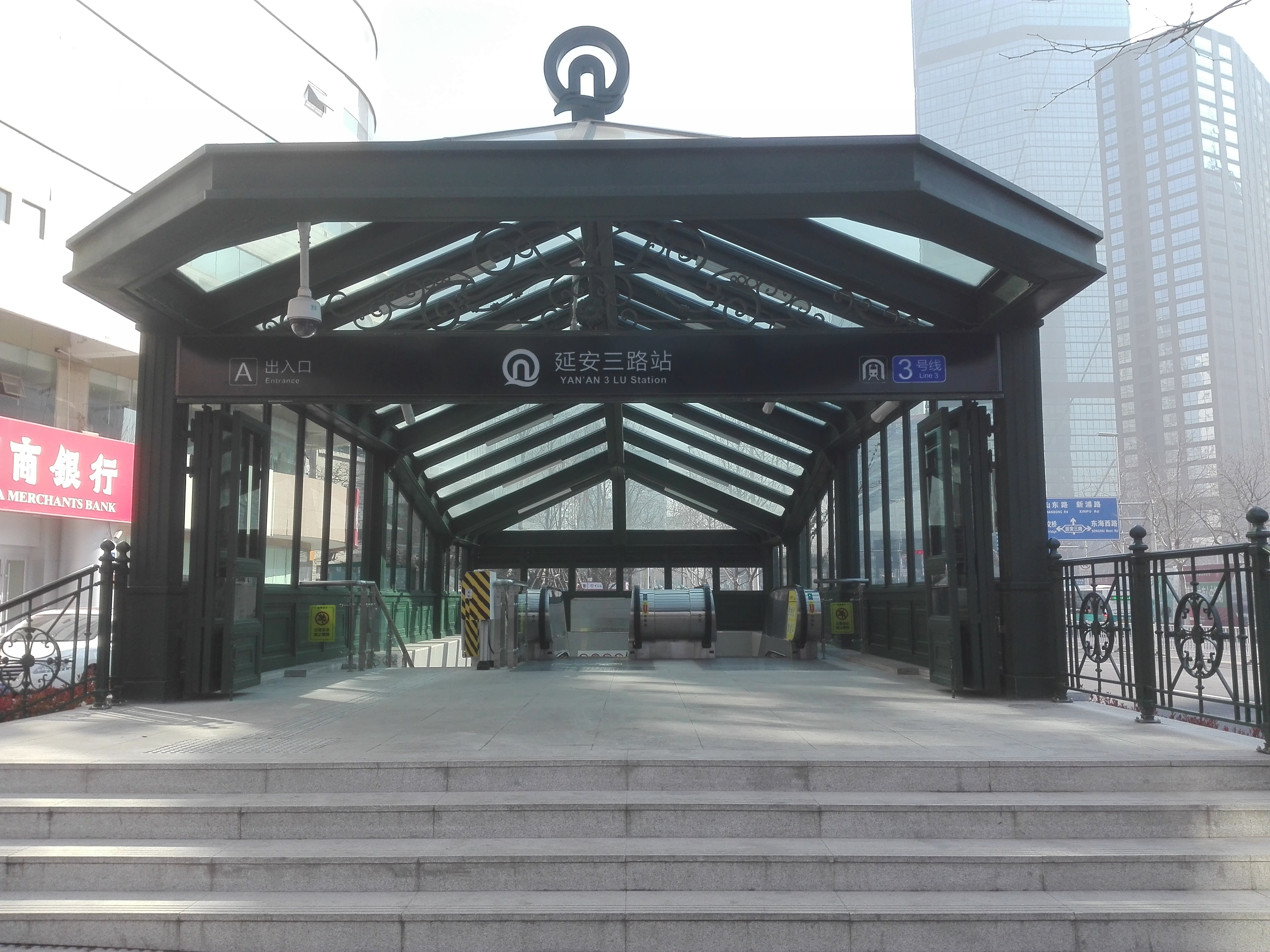
Entrance A

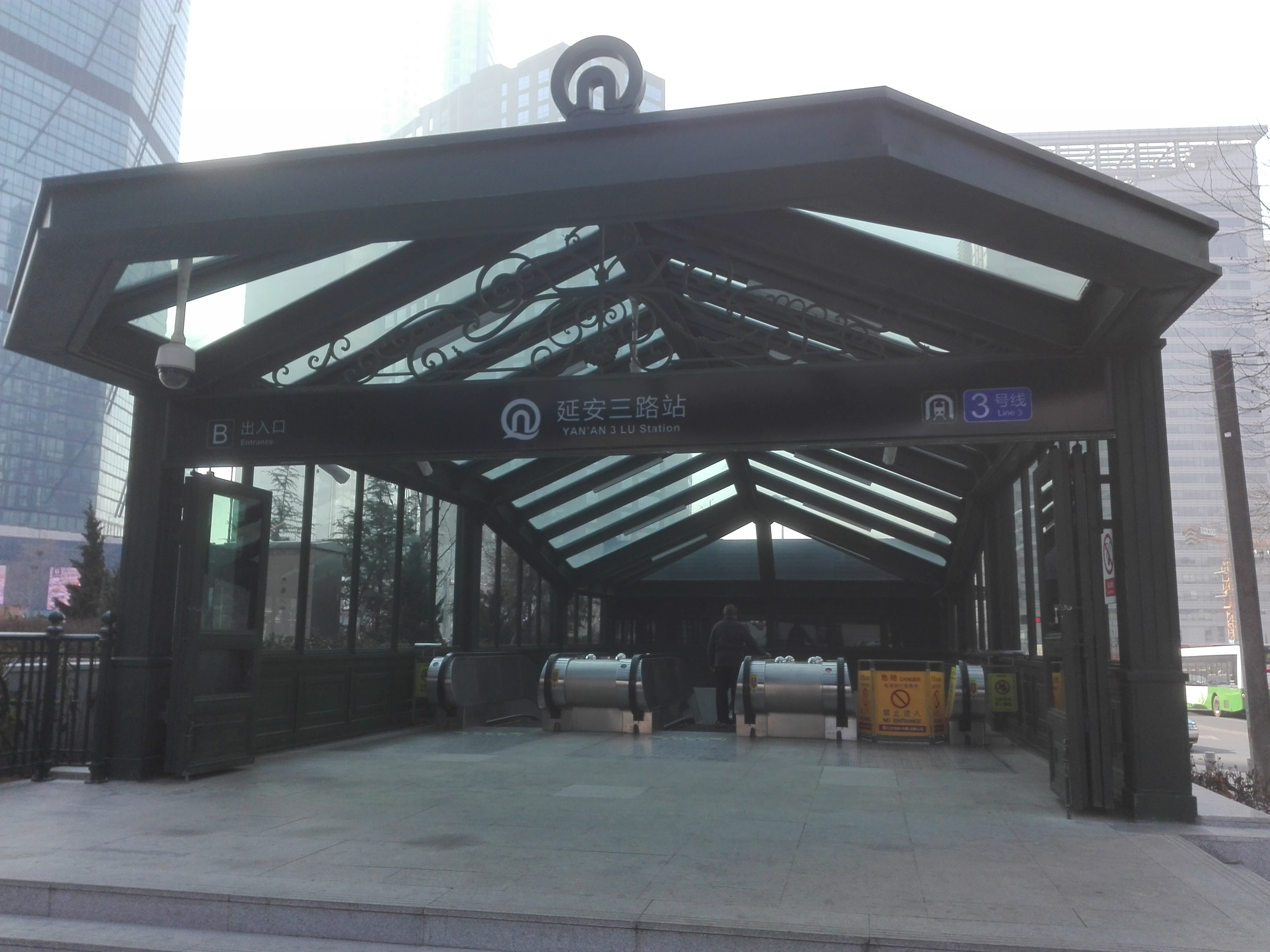
Entrance B

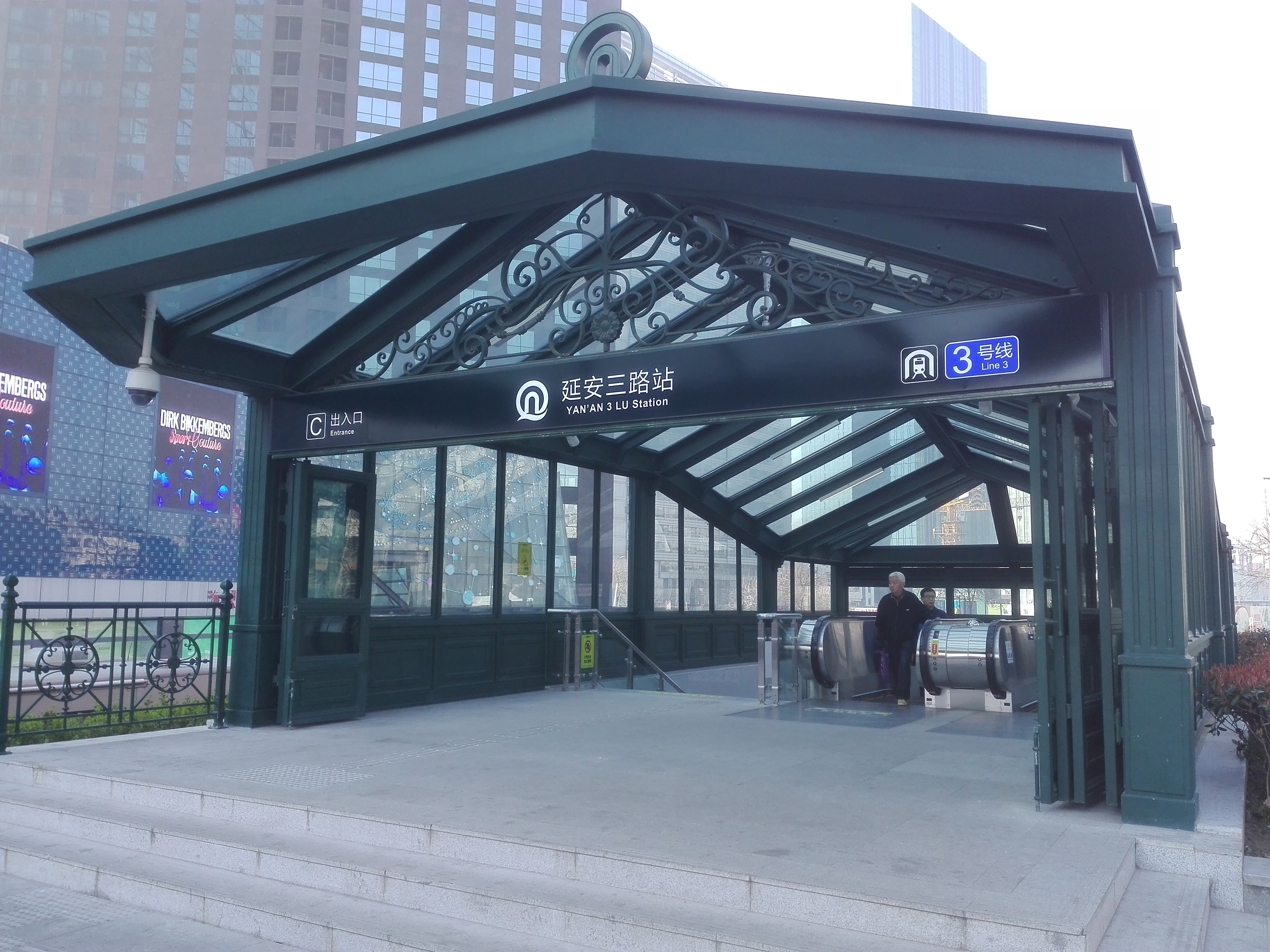
Entrance C

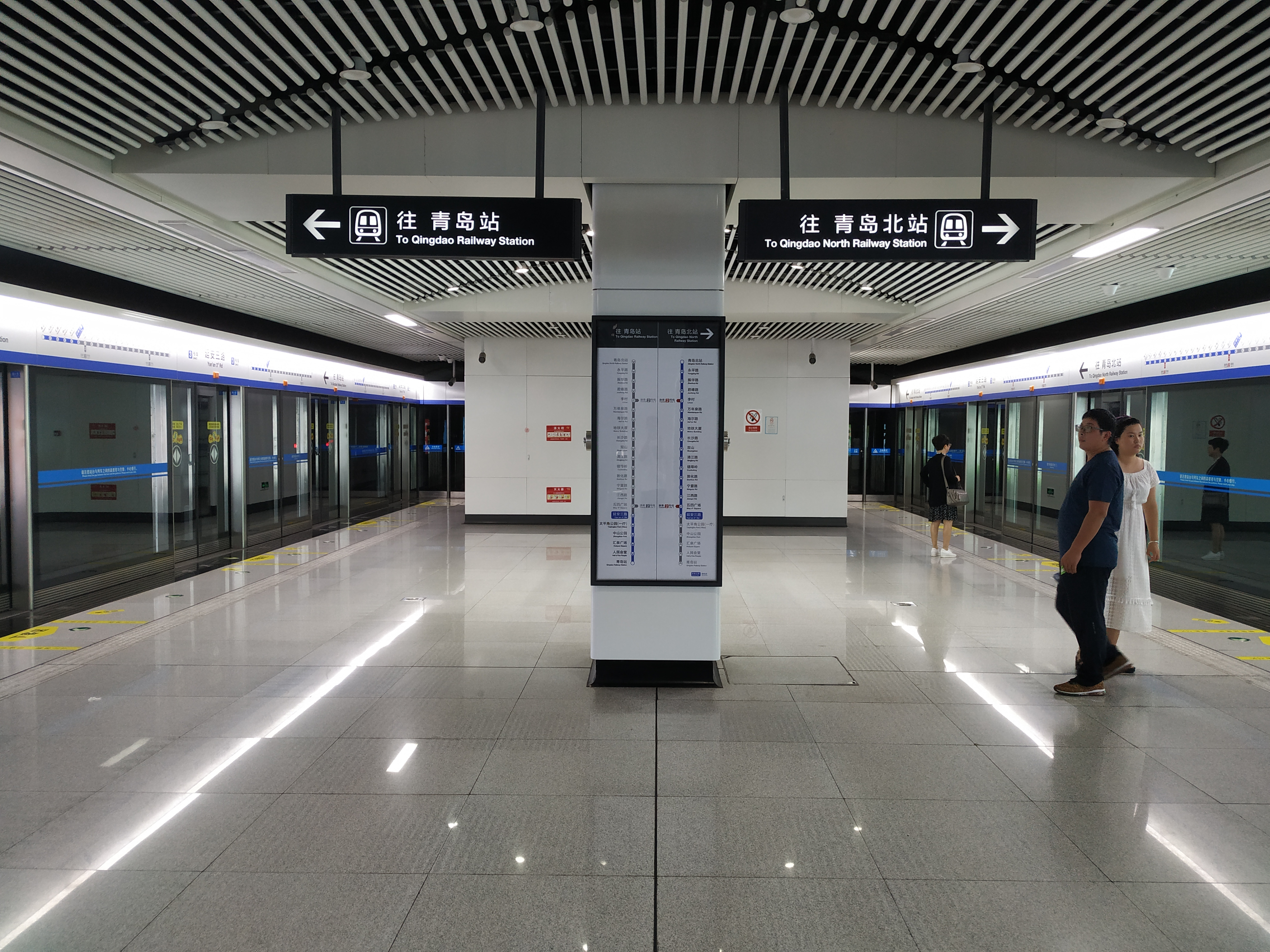
Platform
