= Licun station =

Qingdao Metro station

Licun 李村
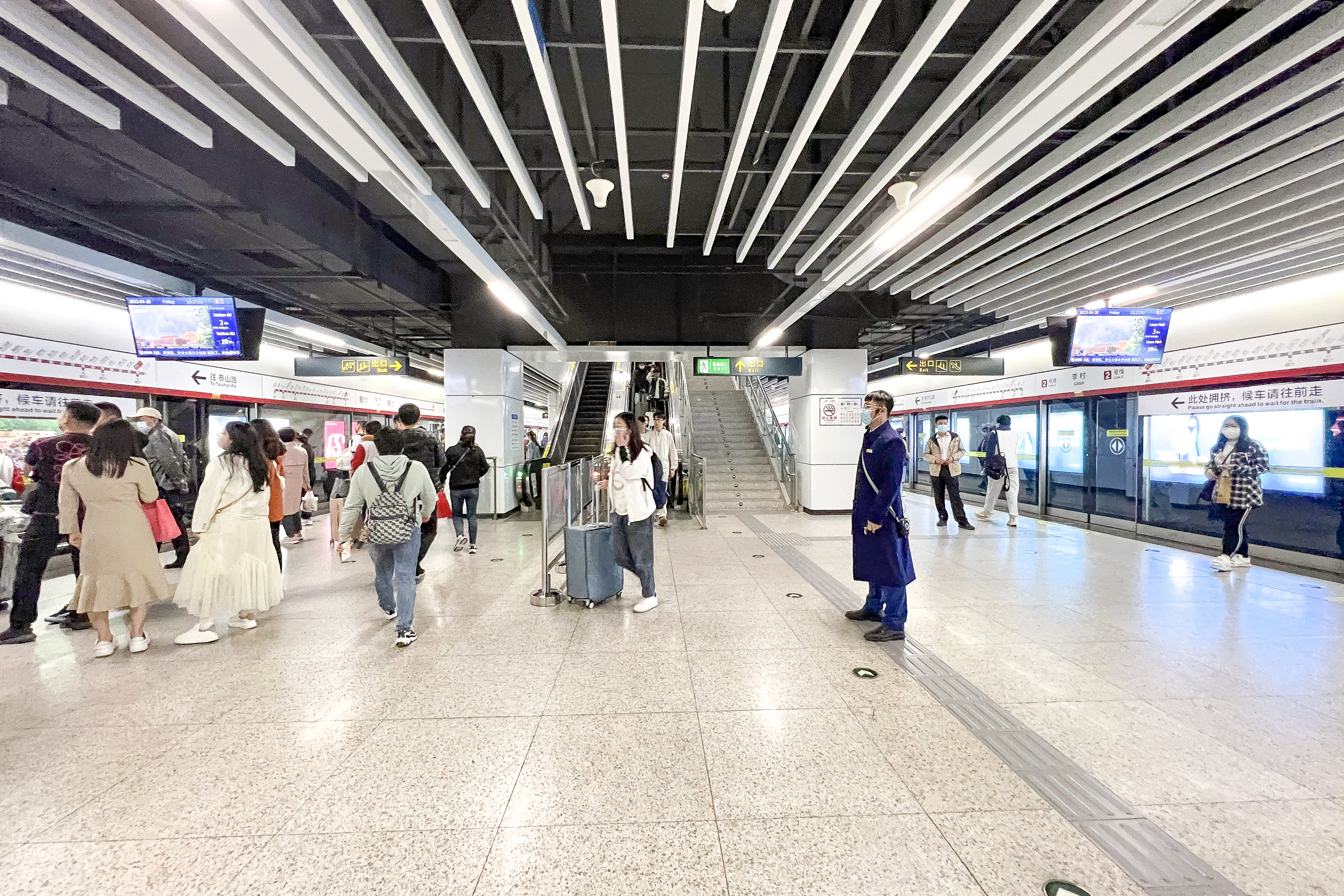
- Line 2 platform

General information
- Location: Licang District, Qingdao, Shandong; China
- Operator: Qingdao Metro Corporation
- Lines: Line 2 Line 3
- Platforms: 4 (2 island platforms)

History
- Opened: 16 December 2015; 10 years ago

Services
Preceding station	Qingdao Metro	Following station
Zaoshan Road towards Sichuan Road (Qingdao Ferry Terminal)	Line 2	Licun Park Terminus
Wannianquan Road towards Qingdao Railway Station	Line 3	Junfeng Road towards Qingdao North Railway Station
Location

Licun (Chinese: 李村) is a transfer station of the Qingdao Metro on Line 2 and Line 3. It opened on 16 December 2015.

== Gallery ==
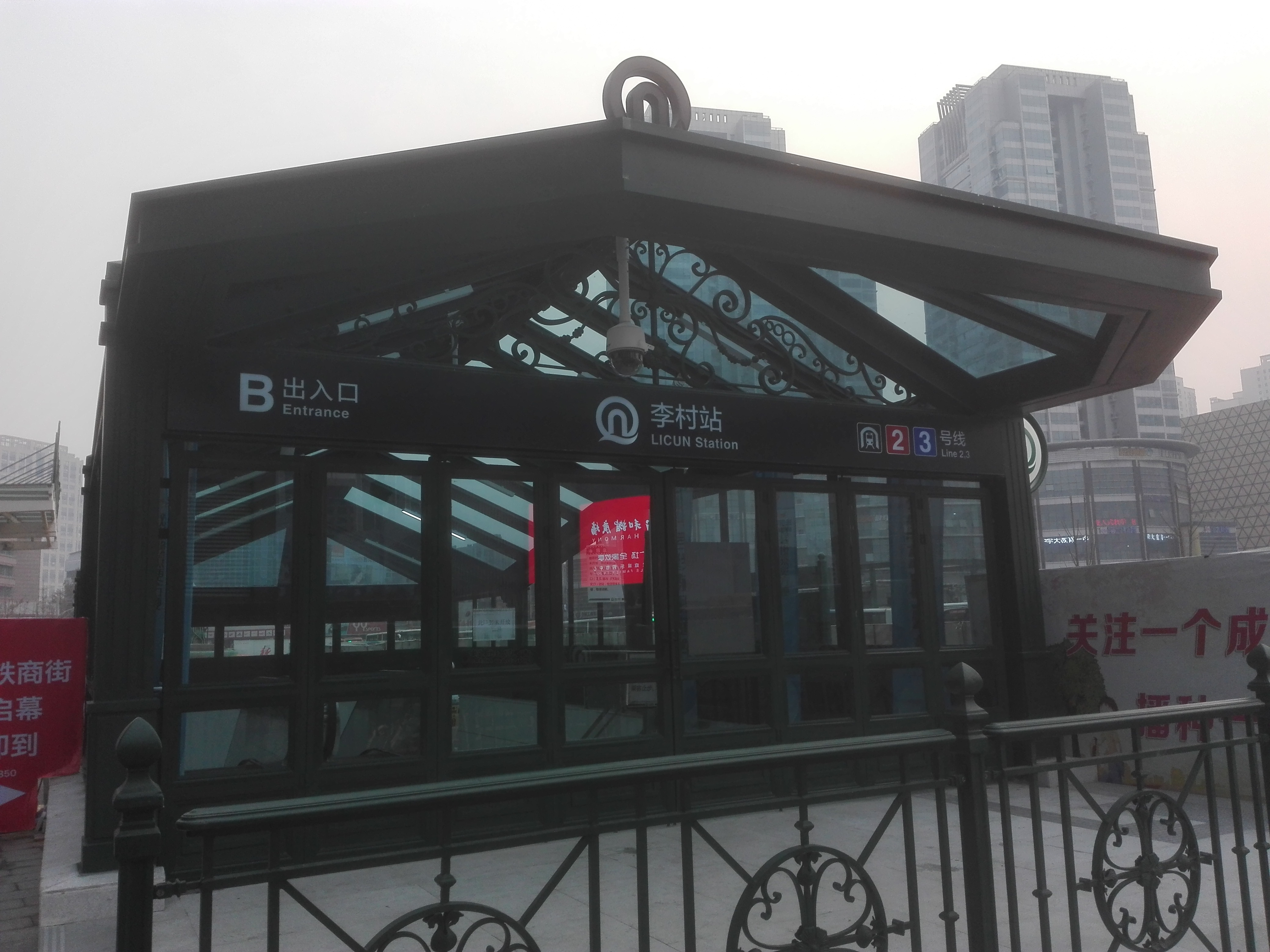
Entrance B

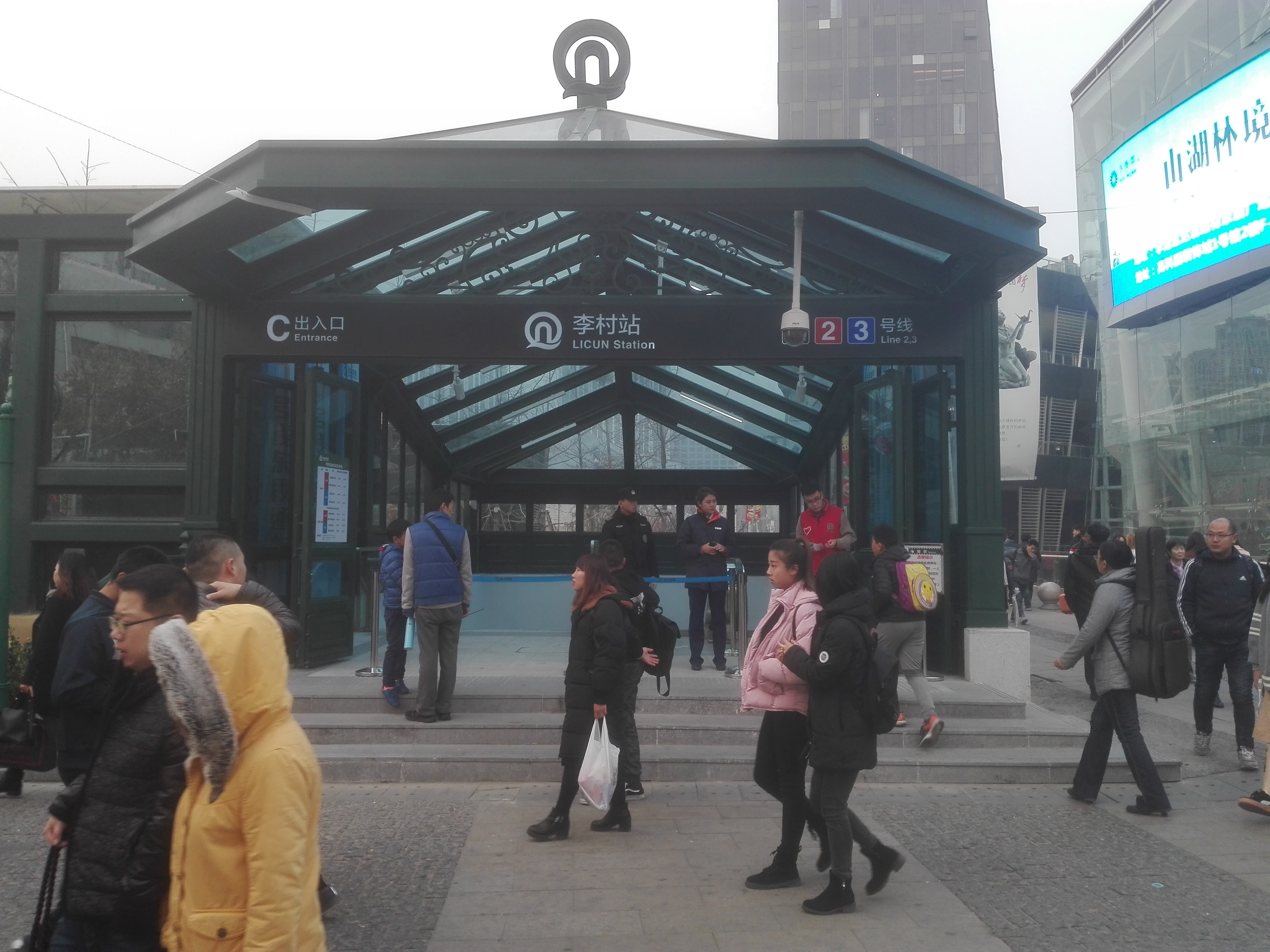
Entrance C

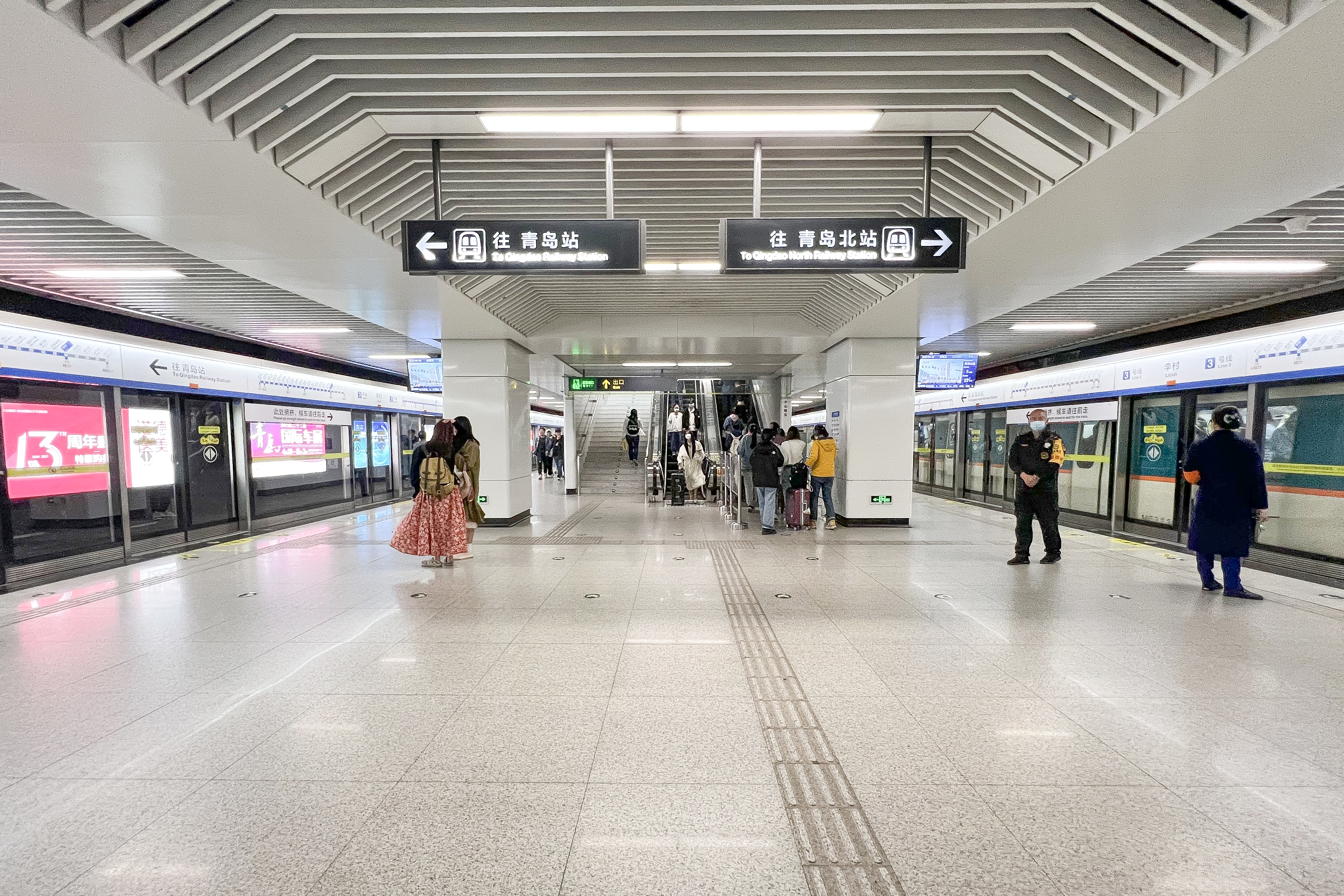
Line 3 platform
