= Wannianquan Road station =

Qingdao Metro station

Wannianquan Road 万年泉路
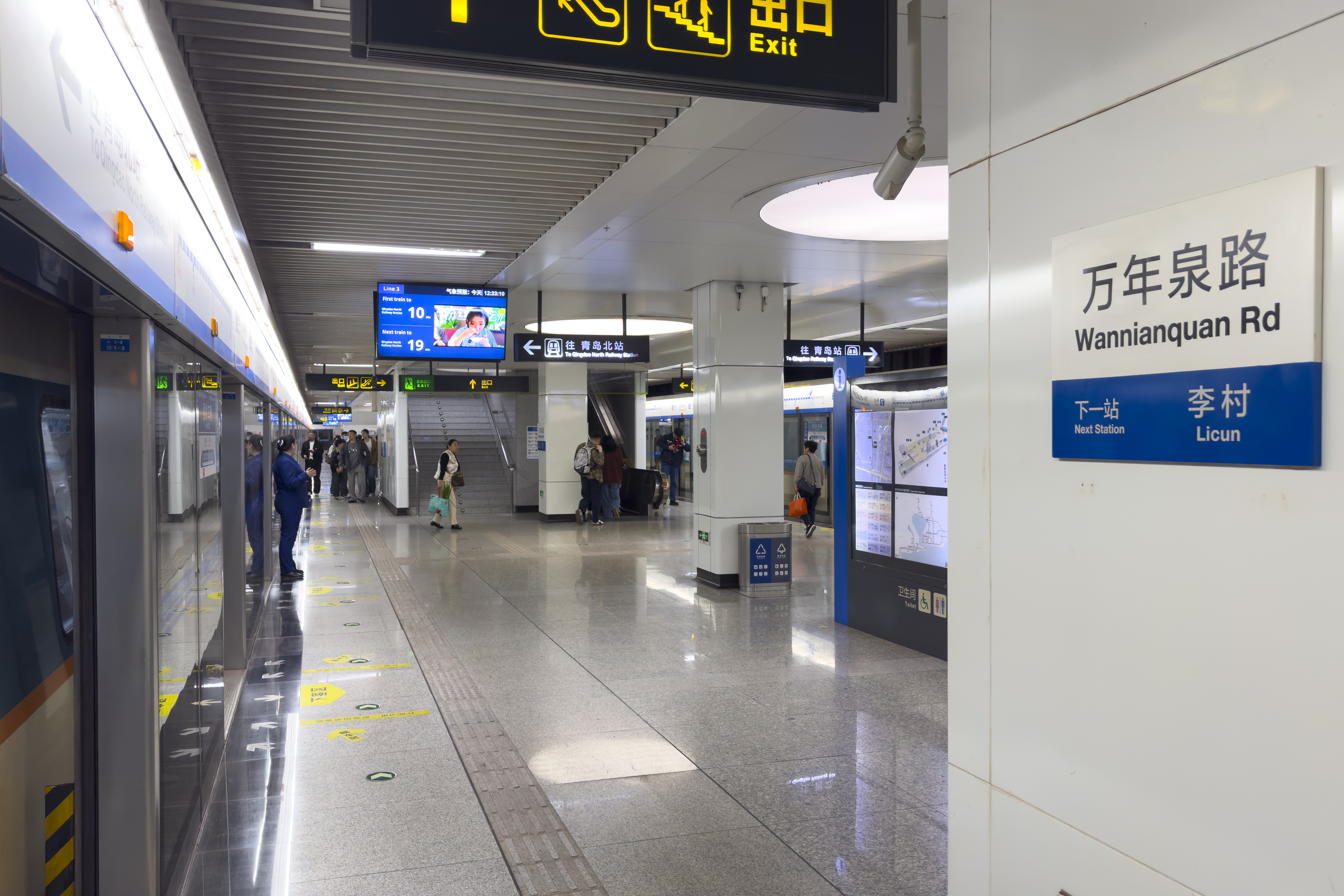

General information
- Location: Licang District, Qingdao; China
- Coordinates: 36.1481°N 120.4225°E
- Operated by: Qingdao Metro Corporation
- Line: Line 3
- Platforms: 2 (1 island platform)

History
- Opened: 16 December 2015; 10 years ago

Services
| Preceding station | Qingdao Metro | Following station |
|---|---|---|
| Hai'er Road towards Qingdao Railway Station | Line 3 | Licun towards Qingdao North Railway Station |
Location

Wannianquan Road (Chinese: 万年泉路) is a station of the Qingdao Metro on Line 3, which opened on 16 December 2015.
