= Dunhua Road station =

Qingdao Metro station

Dunhua Road 敦化路
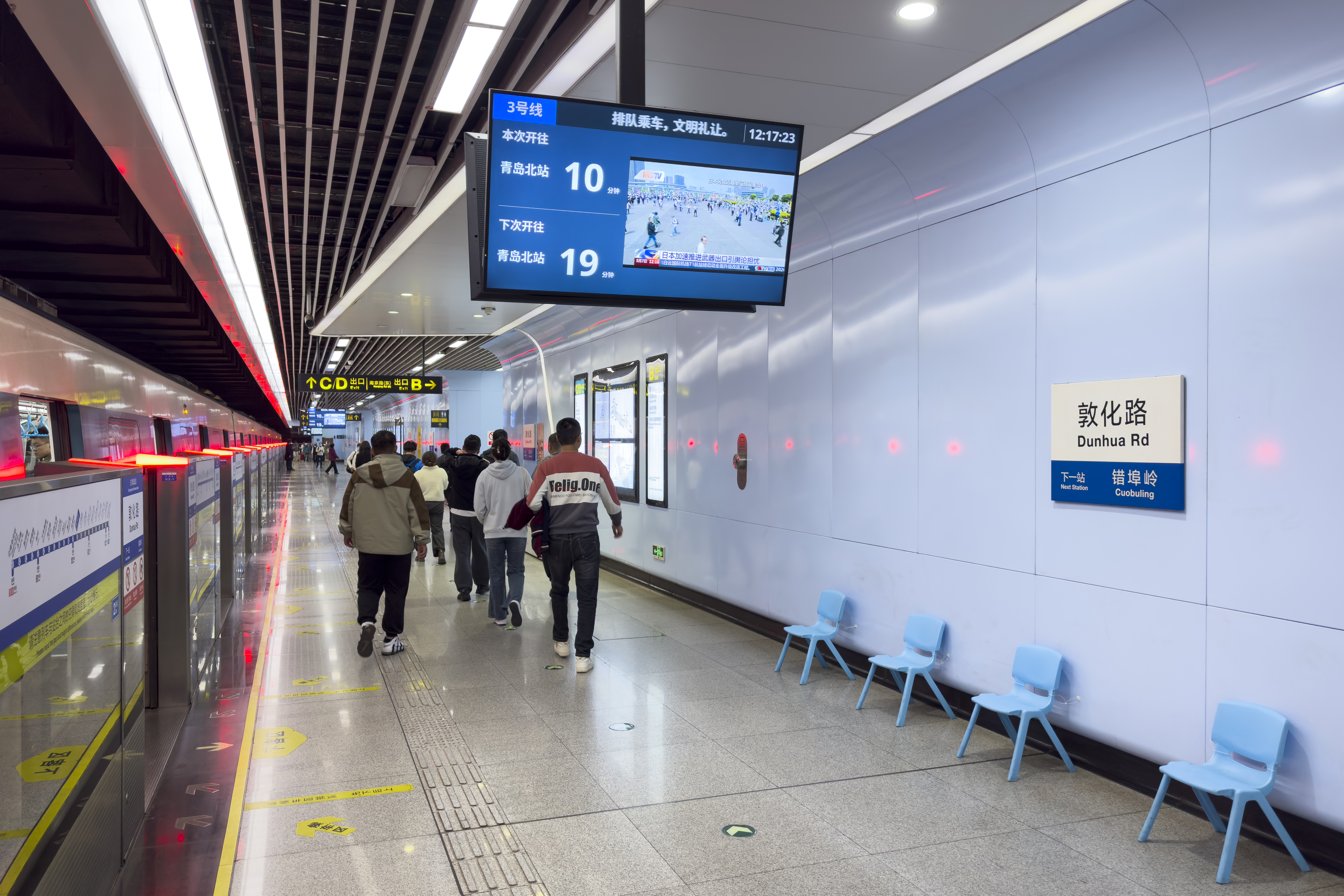

General information
- Location: Shinan District, Qingdao, Shandong; China
- Operator: Qingdao Metro Corporation
- Line: Line 3
- Platforms: 2 (1 island platform)

History
- Opened: 18 December 2016; 9 years ago

Services
| Preceding station | Qingdao Metro | Following station |
|---|---|---|
| Ningxia Road towards Qingdao Railway Station | Line 3 | Cuobuling towards Qingdao North Railway Station |
Location

Dunhua Road (Chinese: 敦化路) is a station on Line 3 of the Qingdao Metro. It opened on 18 December 2016.

== Gallery ==
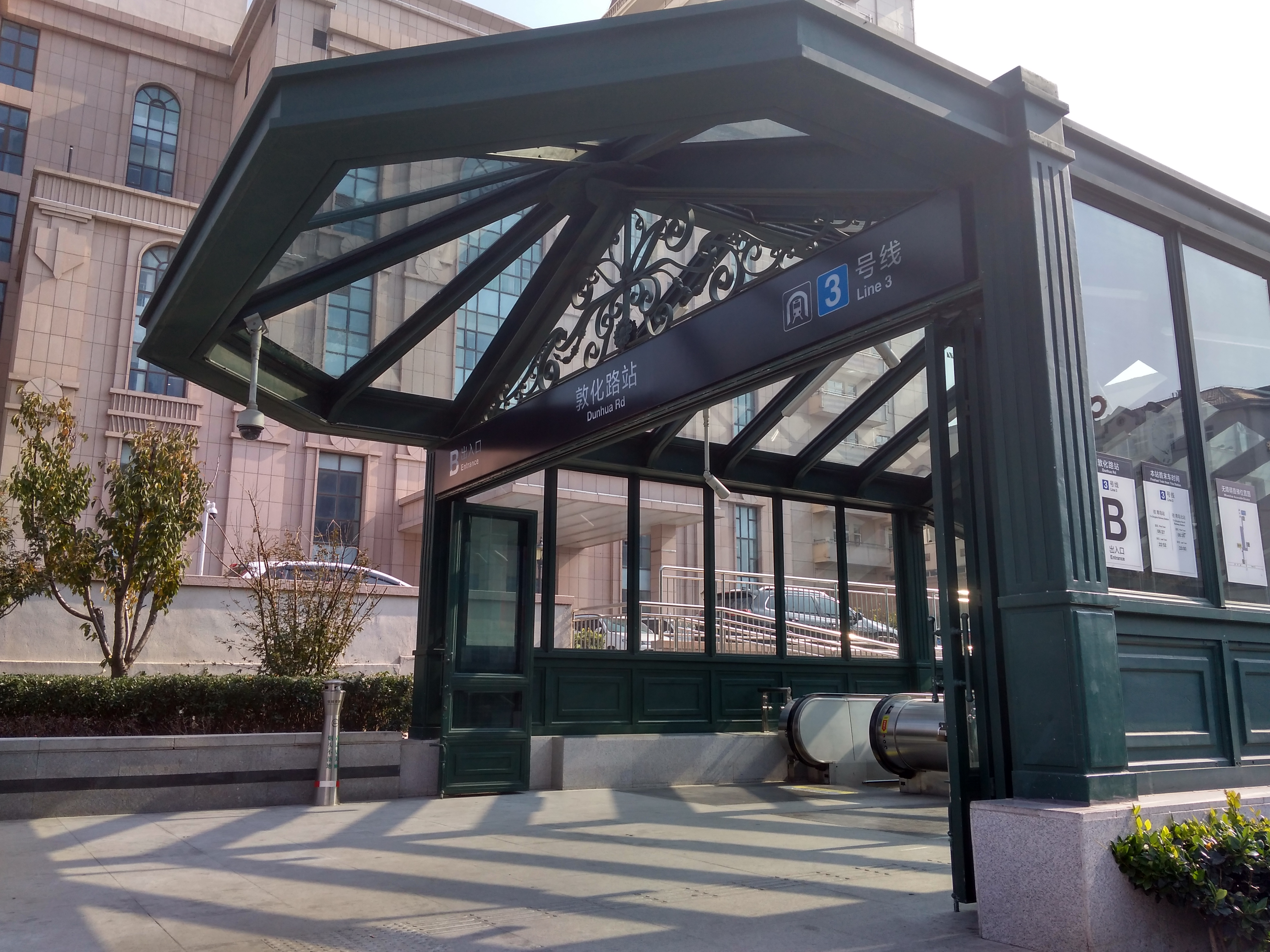
Entrance B

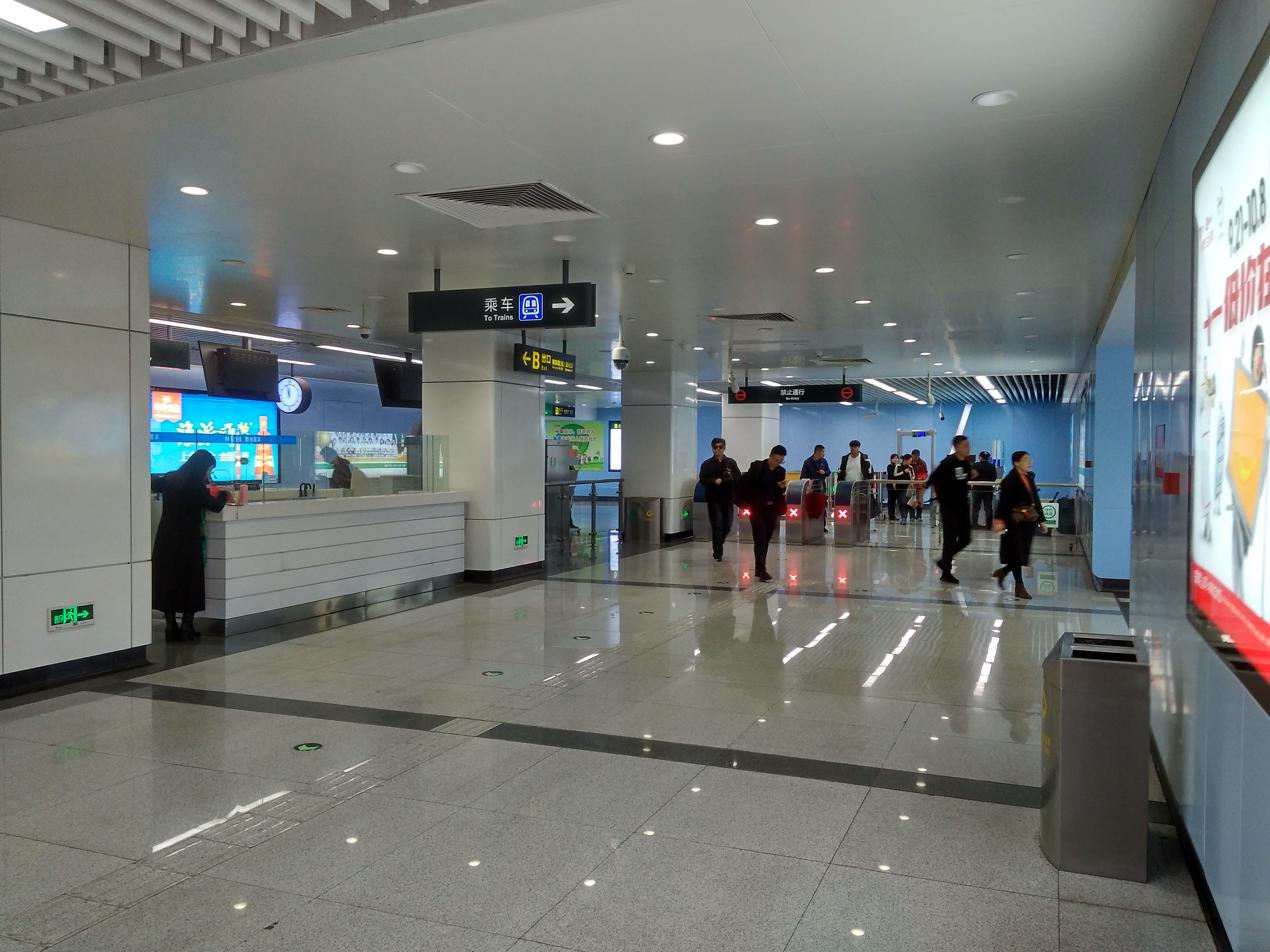
Concourse

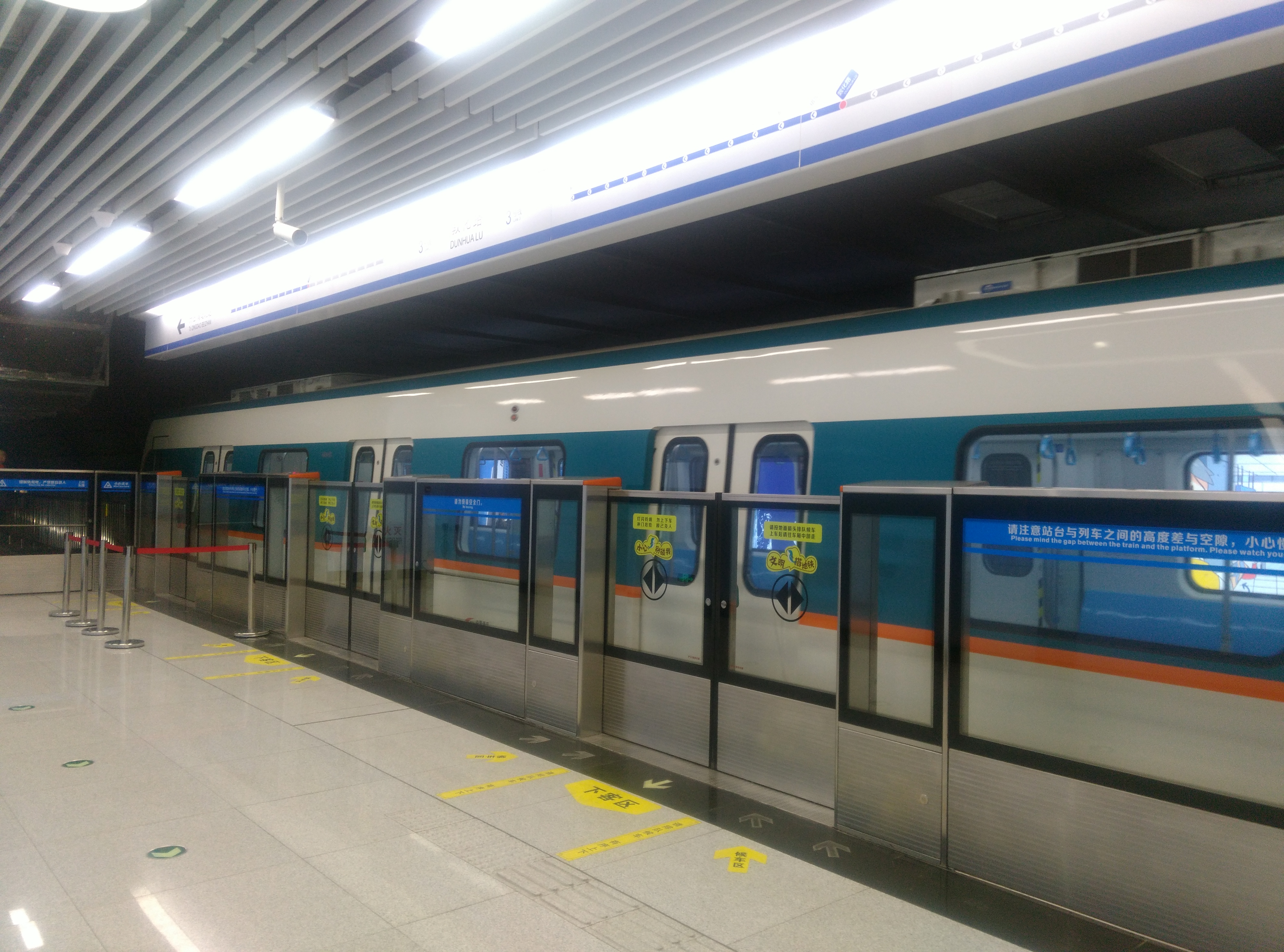
Platform
