= Hai'er Road station =

Qingdao Metro station

Hai'er Road 海尔路
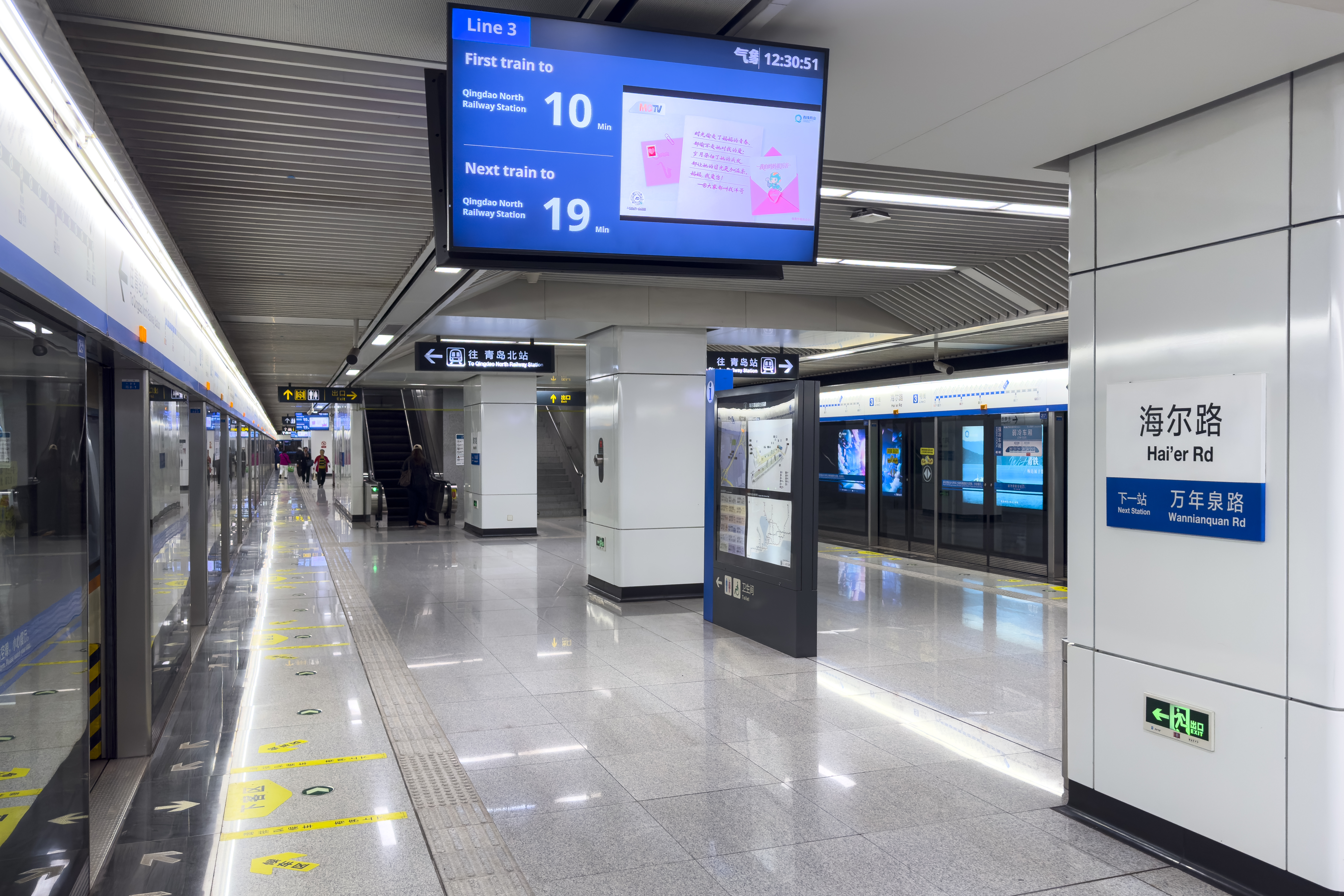

General information
- Location: Licang District, Qingdao, Shandong; China
- Operated by: Qingdao Metro Corporation
- Line: Line 3
- Platforms: 2 (1 island platform)

History
- Opened: 16 December 2015; 10 years ago

Services
Preceding station	Qingdao Metro	Following station
Metro building towards Qingdao Railway Station	Line 3	Wannianquan Road towards Qingdao North Railway Station
Location

Hai'er Road (Chinese: 海尔路) is a station of the Qingdao Metro on Line 3, which opened on 16 December 2015. The station is near the headquarters of Haier.
