= Sifang District =

Sifang District 四方区
- District
- Location of the former seat in Shandong Sifang District (Shandong)
- Coordinates: 36°06′25″N 120°21′33″E
- Country: People's Republic of China
- Province: Shandong
- Sub-provincial city: Qingdao

Area
  - Total: 34.55 km^{2} (13.34 sq mi)
- Elevation: 24 m (79 ft)

Population (2003)
  - Total: 383,700
  - Density: 11,110/km^{2} (28,760/sq mi)
- Time zone: UTC+8 (China Standard)
- Postal code: 266000
- Area code: 0532

Sifang (Chinese: 四方; pinyin: Sìfāng; lit. 'four-way') is a former district at the core of Qingdao, People's Republic of China. In 2003, it had an area of 34.55 square kilometres (13.34 sq mi) and around 383,700 inhabitants. In December 2012, it was merged into Shibei District.
