= Ningxia Road station =

Qingdao Metro station

Ningxia Road 宁夏路
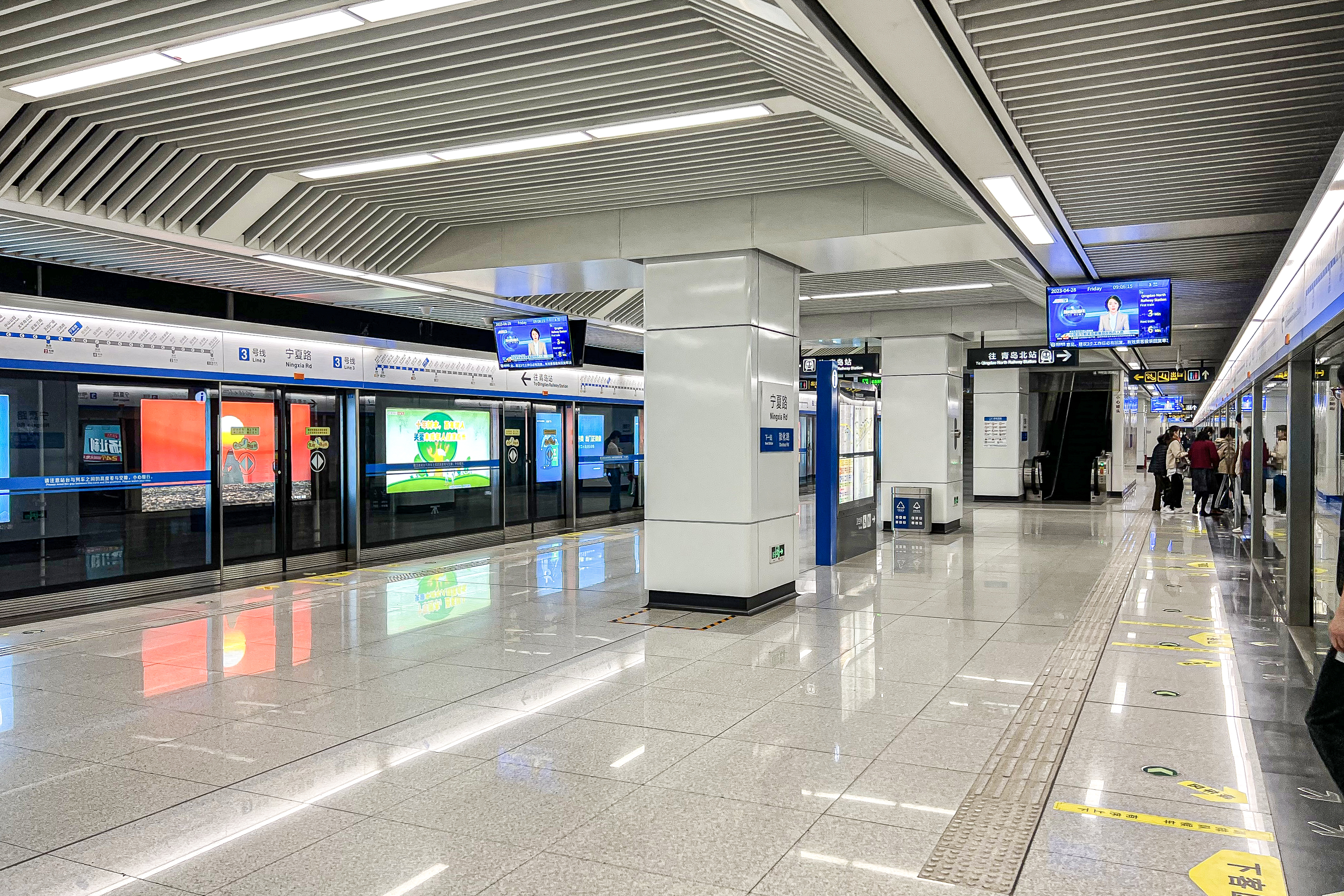

General information
- Location: Shinan District, Qingdao, Shandong; China
- Operator: Qingdao Metro Corporation
- Line: Line 3
- Platforms: 2 (1 island platform)

History
- Opened: 18 December 2016; 9 years ago

Services
Preceding station	Qingdao Metro	Following station
Jiangxi Road towards Qingdao Railway Station	Line 3	Dunhua Road towards Qingdao North Railway Station
Location

Ningxia Road (Chinese: 宁夏路) is a station on Line 3 of the Qingdao Metro. It opened on 18 December 2016.
