= Taipingjiao Park station =

Qingdao Metro station

Taipingjiao Park 太平角公园
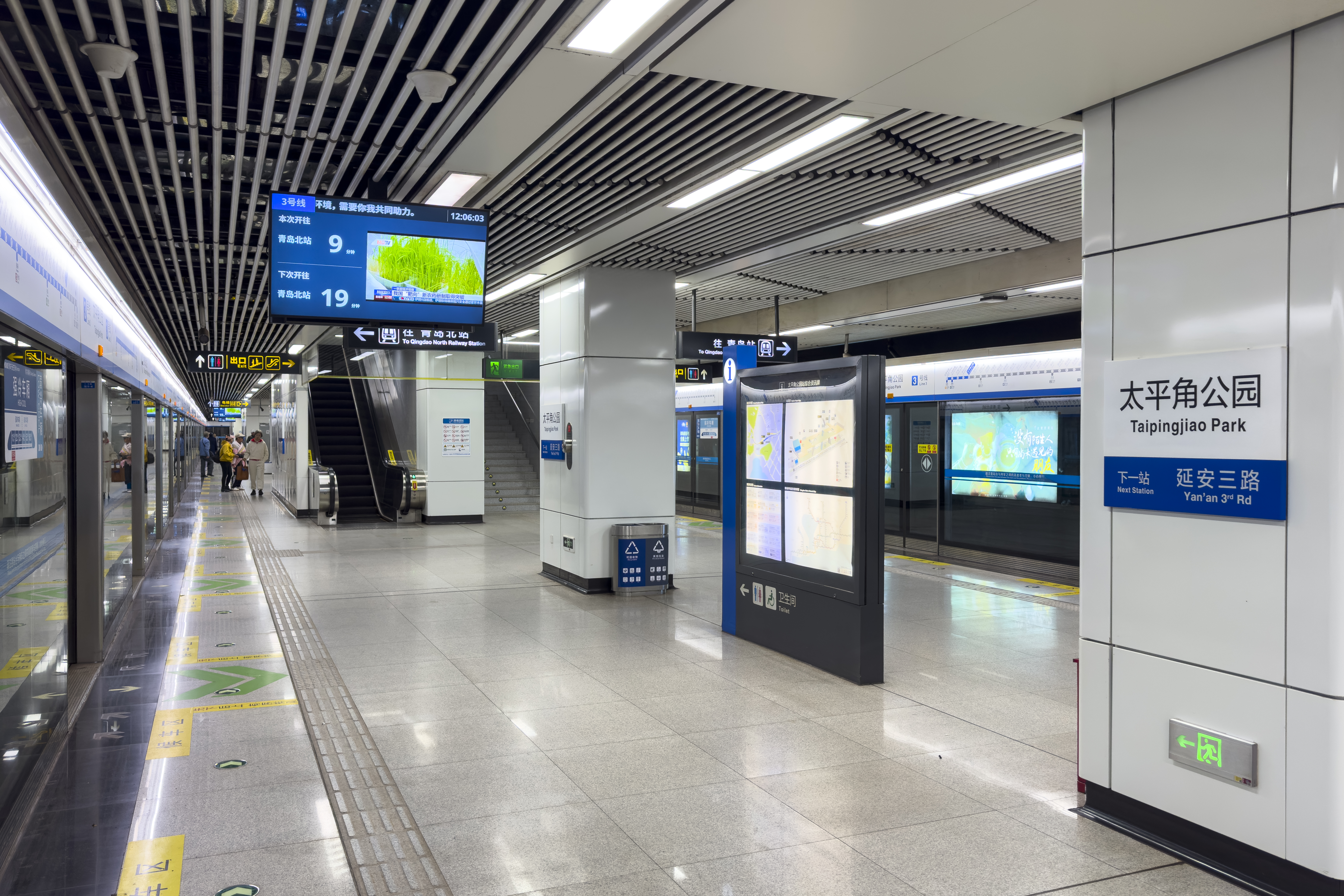

General information
- Location: Shinan District, Qingdao, Shandong; China
- Coordinates: 36.053611°N 120.354722°E
- Operator: Qingdao Metro Corporation
- Line: Line 3
- Platforms: 2 (1 island platform)

History
- Opened: 18 December 2016; 9 years ago

Services
| Preceding station | Qingdao Metro | Following station |
|---|---|---|
| Zhongshan Park towards Qingdao Railway Station | Line 3 | Yan'an 3rd Road towards Qingdao North Railway Station |
Location

Taipingjiao Park, formerly known as Taipingjiao Gongyuan • Yiliao (Chinese: 太平角公园) is a station on Line 3 of the Qingdao Metro. It opened on 18 December 2016.

== Gallery ==
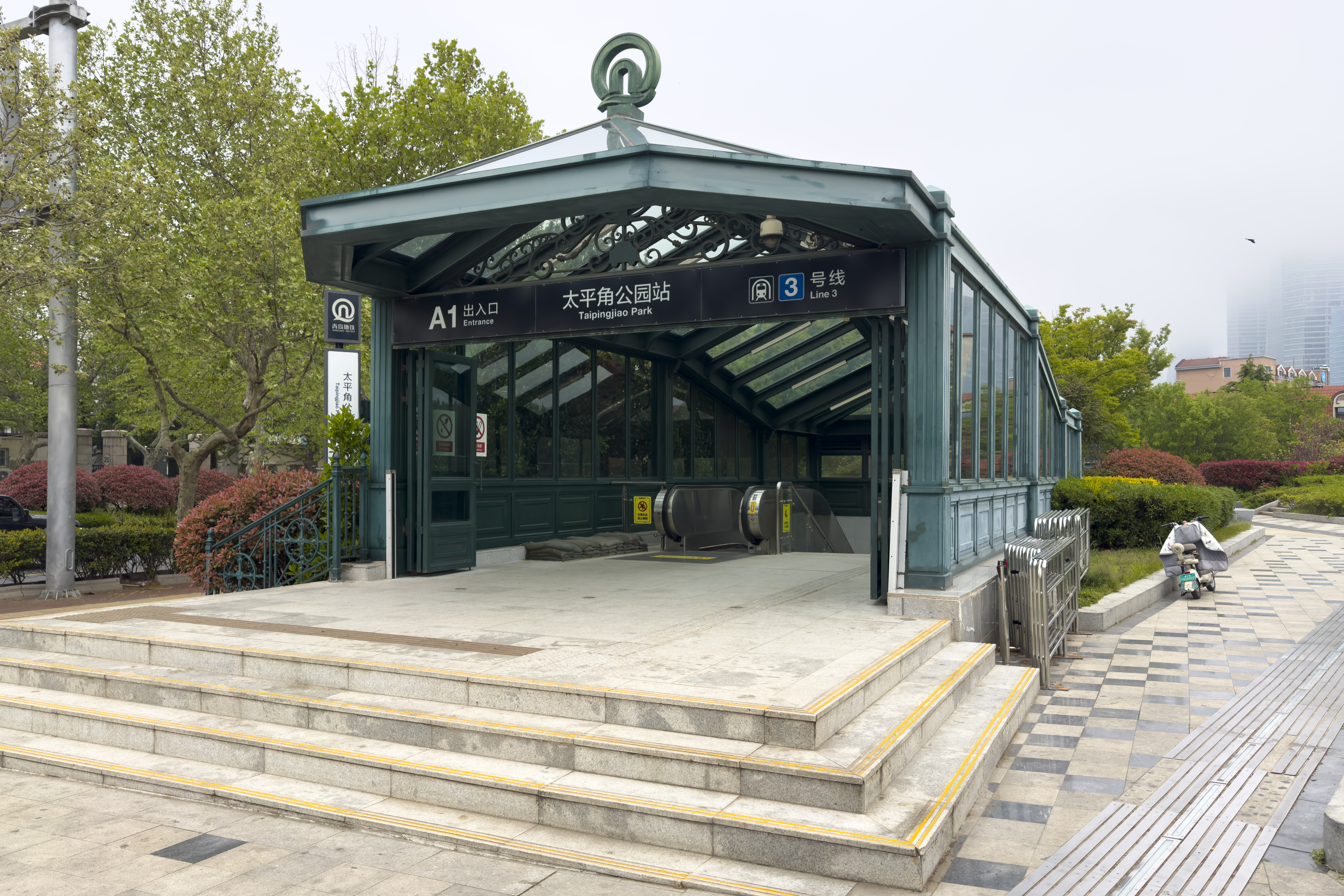
Entrance A1

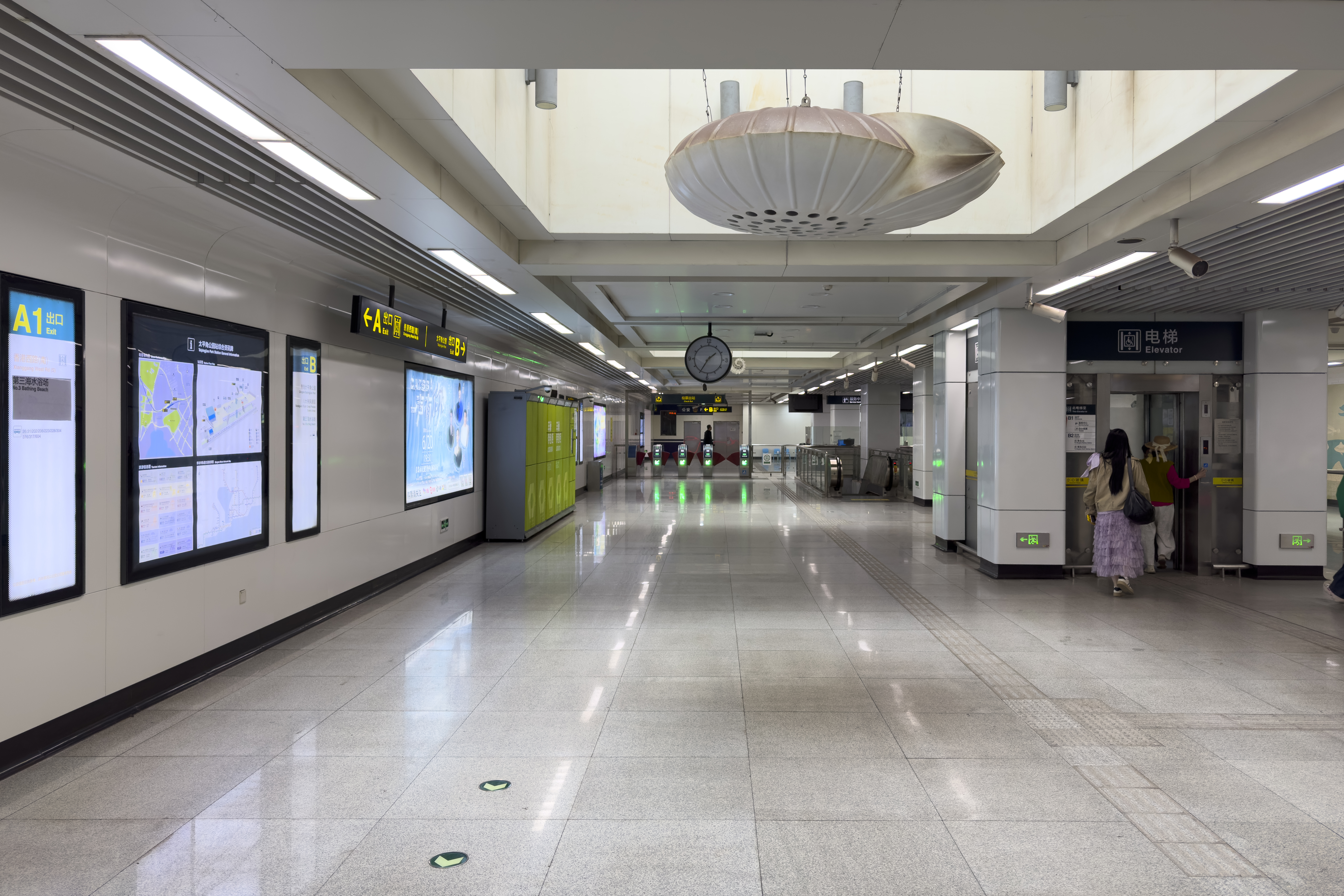
Concourse
