= Shibei, Qingdao =

Shibei 市北区
- District
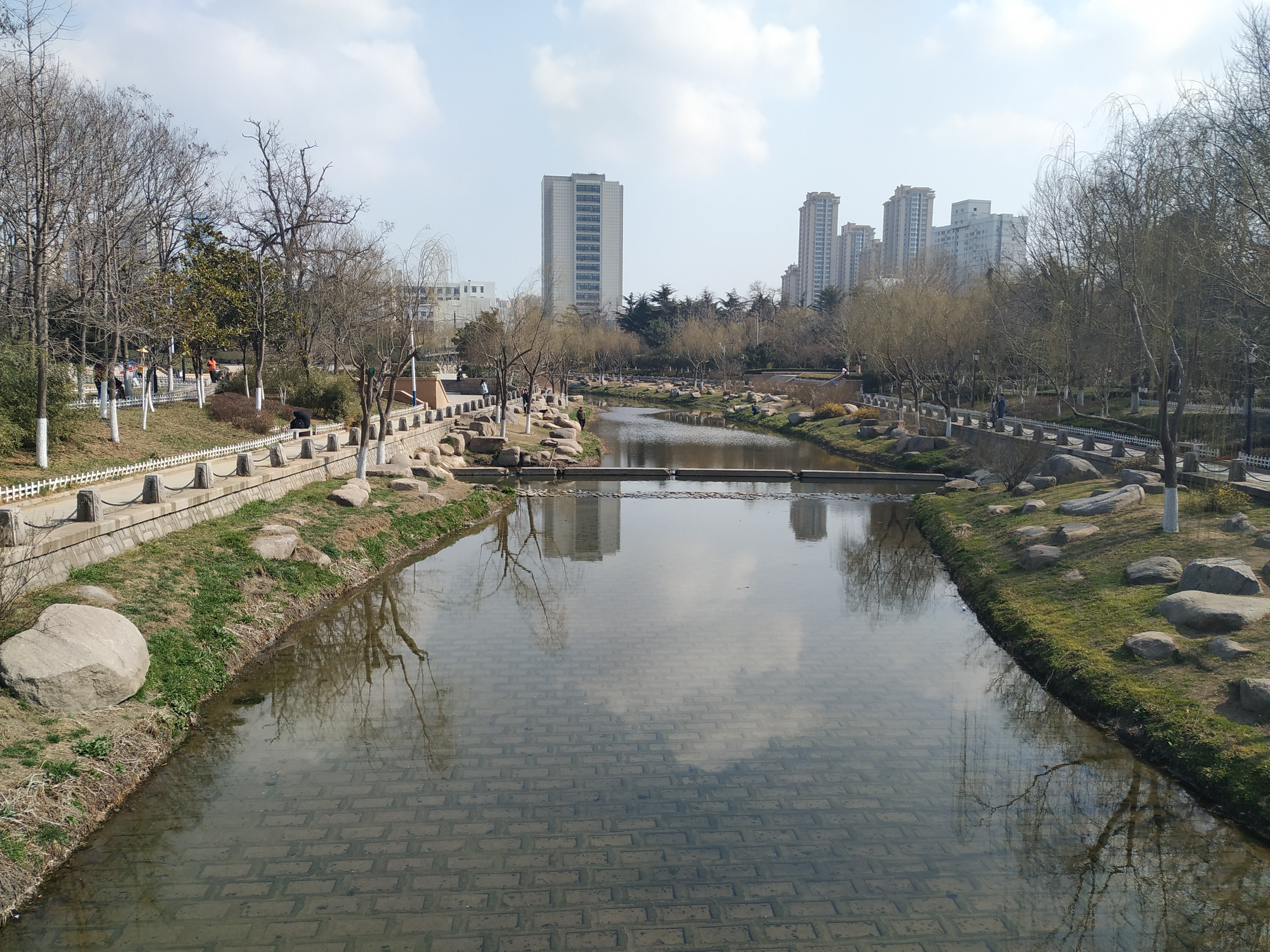

- Shibei in Qingdao

- Location in Shandong
- Coordinates: 36°05′15″N 120°22′30″E
- Country: People's Republic of China
- Province: Shandong
- Sub-provincial city: Qingdao
- Township-level divisions: 23 subdistricts
- District seat: Dunhua Road Subdistrict (敦化路街道)

Area
  - Total: 63.18 km^{2} (24.39 sq mi)
- Elevation: 32 m (105 ft)

Population (2019)
  - Total: 1,111,000
  - Density: 17,580/km^{2} (45,540/sq mi)
- Time zone: UTC+8 (China Standard)
- Postal code: 266011
- Area code: 0532
- Website: shibei.qingdao.gov.cn

Shibei District (Chinese: 市北区; pinyin: Shìběi Qū; lit. 'North City District') is an urban district of Qingdao, Shandong Province, People's Republic of China. As of 2010, it has an area of 63.18 square kilometres (24.39 sq mi) and around 1,027,000 inhabitants. In December 2012, the neighbouring Sifang District was merged into Shibei.

== Administrative divisions ==
Shibei District is divided into 23 subdistricts, the latter seven of which were ceded from Sifang District:

- Liaoning Road Subdistrict (辽宁路街道)
- Yan'an Road Subdistrict (延安路街道)
- Huayang Road Subdistrict (华阳路街道)
- Dengzhou Road Subdistrict (登州路街道)
- Ningxia Road Subdistrict (宁夏路街道)
- Dunhua Road Subdistrict (敦化路街道)
- Liaoyuan Road Subdistrict (辽源路街道)
- Hefei Road Subdistrict (合肥路街道)
- Xiaogang Subdistrict (小港街道)
- Dagang Subdistrict (大港街道)
- Jimo Road Subdistrict (即墨路街道)
- Taidong Subdistrict (台东街道)
- Zhenjiang Road Subdistrict (镇江路街道)
- Hongshanpo Subdistrict (洪山坡街道)
- Tong'an Road Subdistrict (同安路街道)
- Fushan New Area Subdistrict (浮山新区街道)
- Fuxin Road Subdistrict (阜新路街道)
- Hailun Road Subdistrict (海伦路街道)
- Jiaxing Road Subdistrict (嘉兴路街道)
- Xinglong Road Subdistrict (兴隆路街道)
- Shuiqinggou Subdistrict (水清沟街道)
- Luoyang Road Subdistrict (洛阳路街道)
- Hexi Subdistrict (河西街道)

== Economy ==
=== Port ===
Shibei is home to part of the Qingdao Port, one of China's major trade ports and the seventh busiest in the world, with wharves for ore, crude oil, and coal. It operates more than 125 international sea routes to more than 450 ports in more than 130 countries and regions around the world. In 2009, the port handled 317 million tons of cargo, with 222 million tons from foreign trade and 10.28 million standard containers, making it the world's seventh largest port (ninth in foreign cargo).
