= Qingdao Central Legal-Services District (Yan'erdao Road) station =

Qingdao Metro station

Qingdao Central Legal-Services District (Yan'erdao Road) 青岛中央法务区（燕儿岛路）
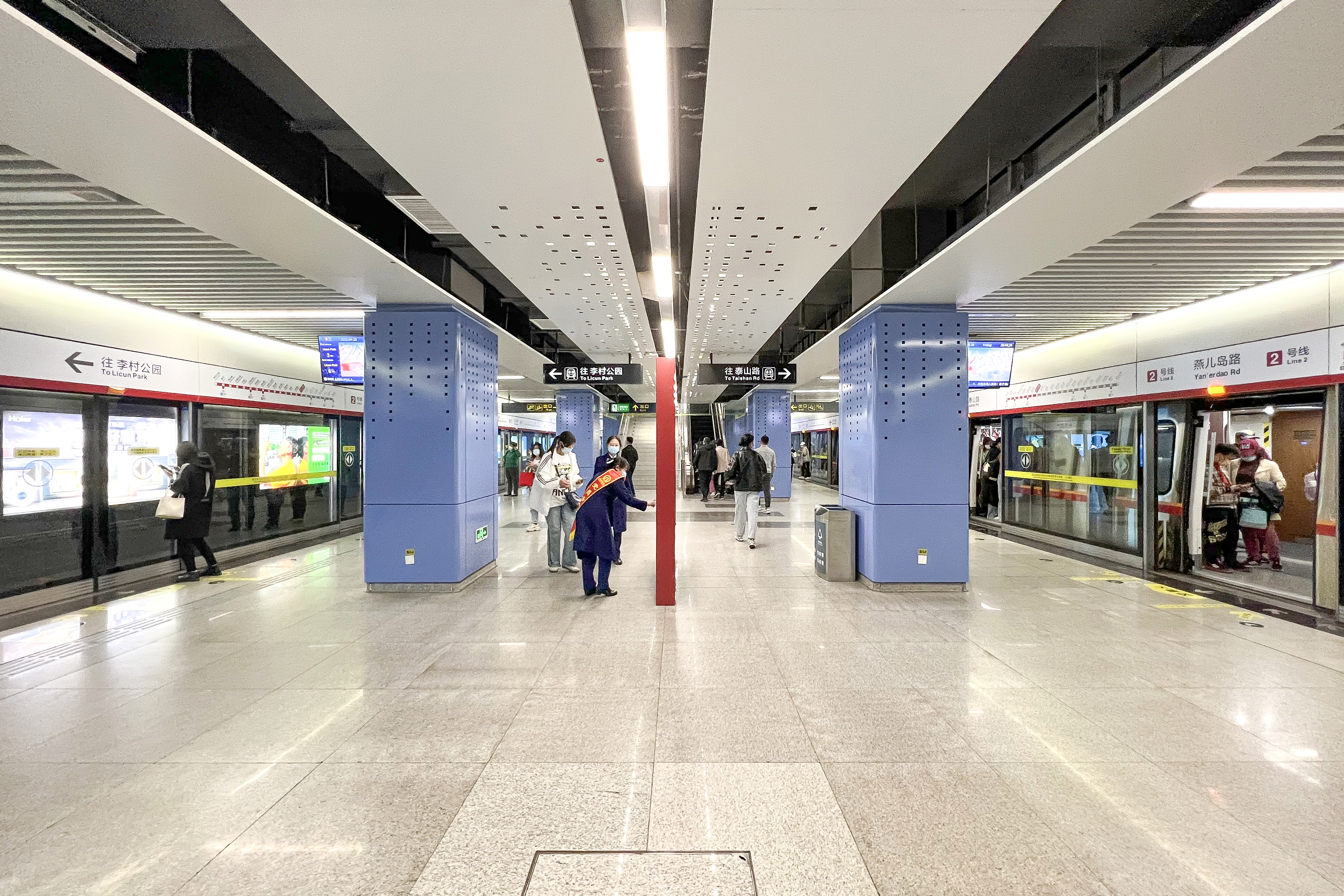

General information
- Location: Shinan District, Qingdao, Shandong; China
- Operator: Qingdao Metro Corporation
- Line: Line 2
- Platforms: 2 (1 island platform)

History
- Opened: 10 December 2017; 8 years ago

Services
Preceding station	Qingdao Metro	Following station
Fushansuo towards Sichuan Road (Qingdao Ferry Terminal)	Line 2	Gaoxiong Road towards Licun Park
Location

Qingdao Central Legal-Services District (Yan'erdao Road) station (Chinese: 青岛中央法务区（燕儿岛路）站) is a station on Line 2 of the Qingdao Metro. It opened on 10 December 2017. The station renamed to its current name in 2026.

== Gallery ==
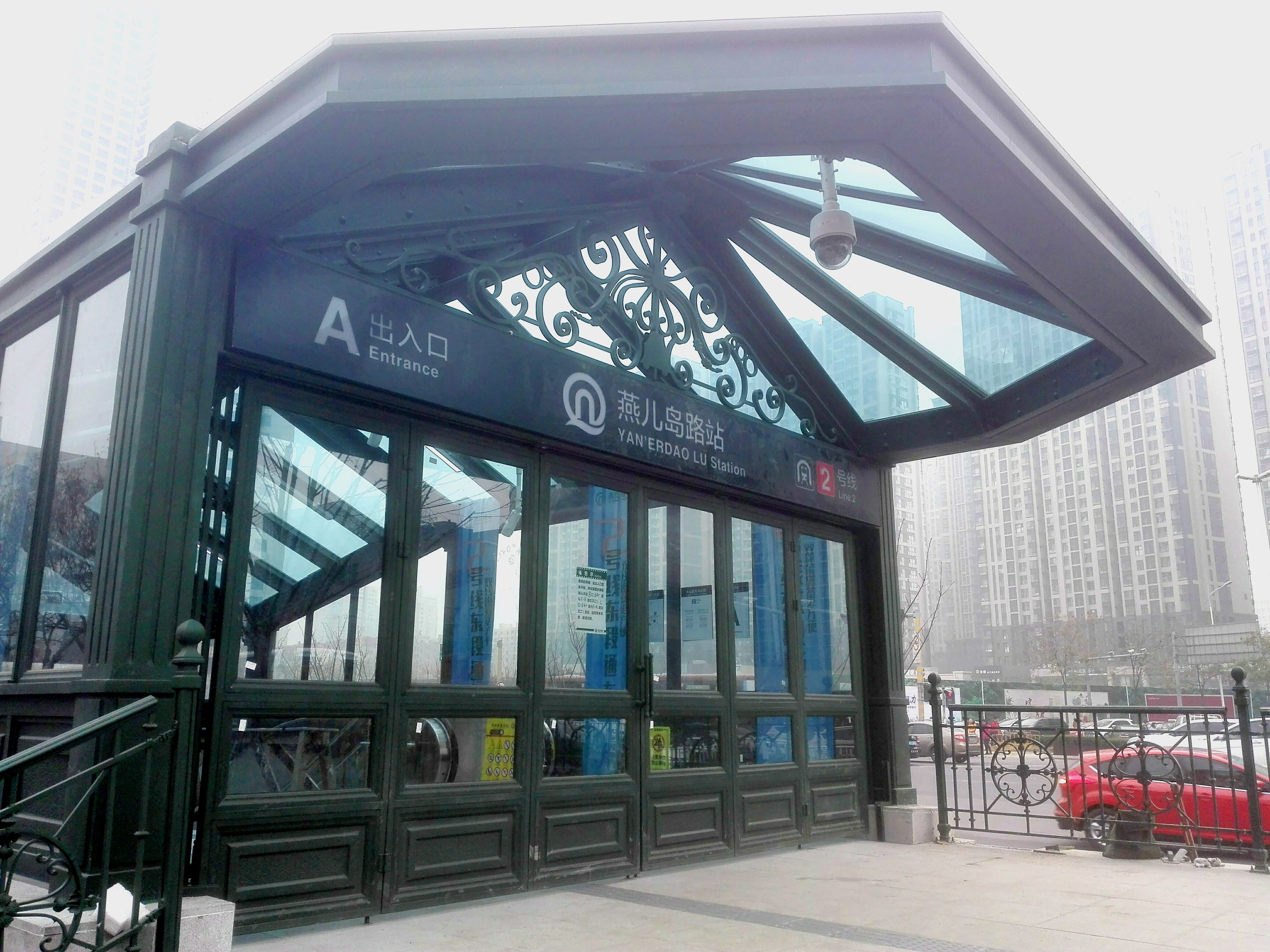
Entrance A

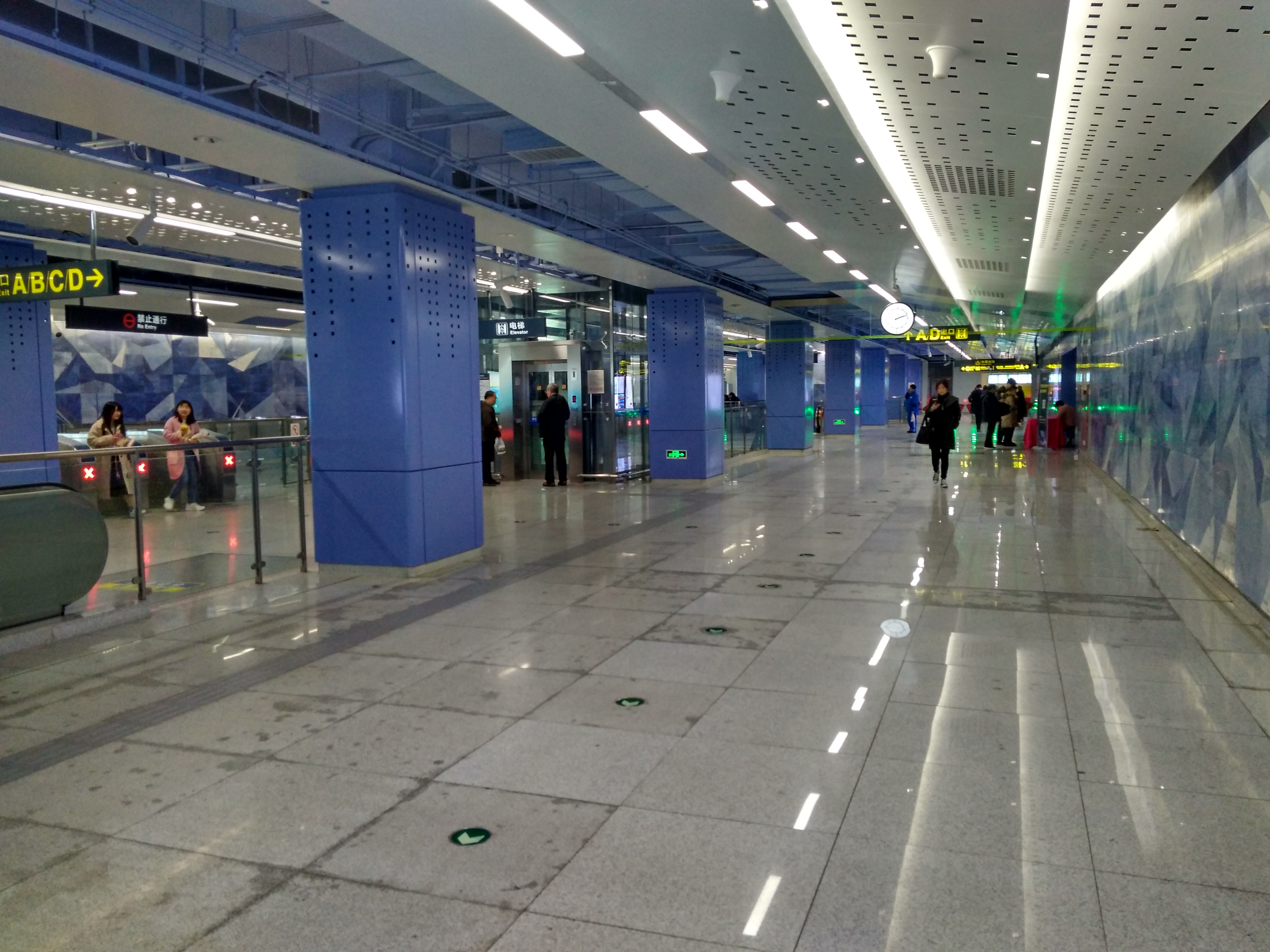
Concourse
