= Haiyou Road station =

Qingdao Metro station

Haiyou Road 海游路
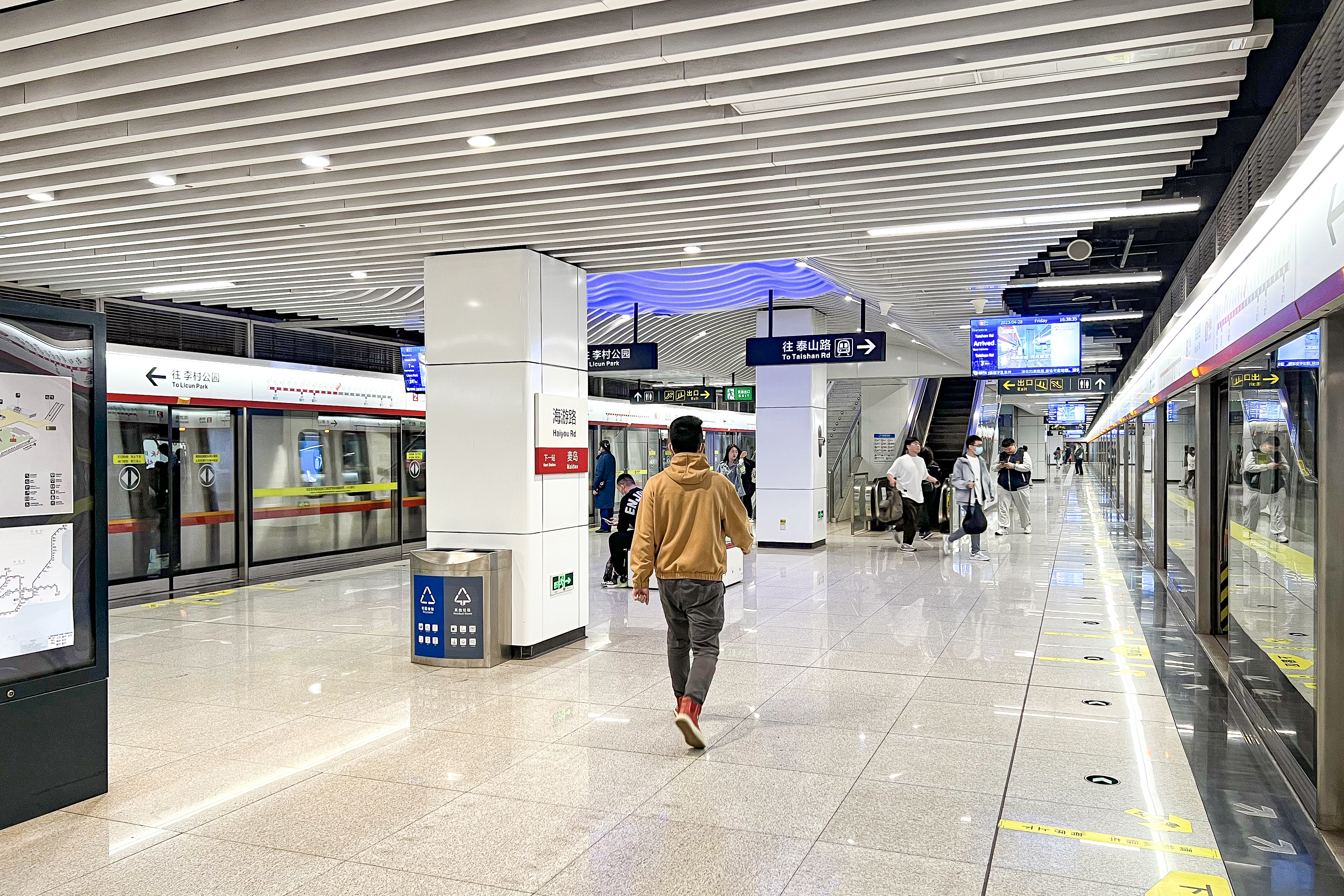

General information
- Location: Laoshan District, Qingdao, Shandong; China
- Coordinates: 36°4′17.44″N 120°25′47.39″E
- Operated by: Qingdao Metro Corporation
- Line(s): Line 2
- Platforms: 2 (1 island platform)

History
- Opened: 10 December 2017; 7 years ago

Services
Preceding station	Qingdao Metro	Following station
Maidao towards Taishan Road	Line 2	Haichuan Road towards Licun Park
Location

Haiyou Road (Chinese: 海游路) is a station on Line 2 of the Qingdao Metro. It opened on 10 December 2017.
