= Line 2 (Qingdao Metro) =

Metro line in Qingdao, China

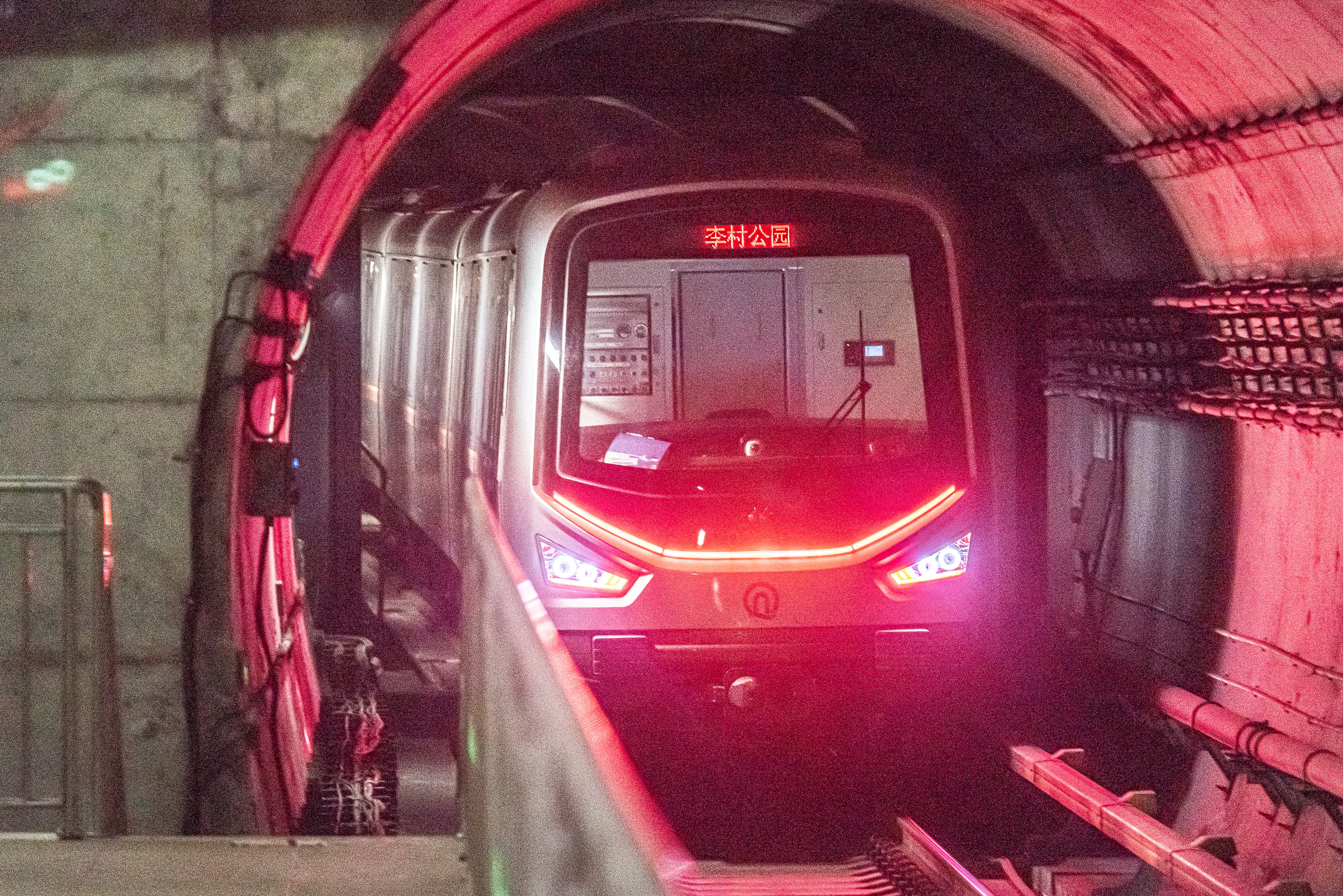
- A train leaving Miaoling Rd station

Overview
- Status: In operation
- Owner: Government of Qingdao
- Locale: Qingdao, China
- Termini: Sichuan Road (Qingdao Ferry Terminal); Licun Park
- Stations: 25

Service
- Type: Rapid transit
- System: Qingdao Metro
- Services: 1
- Operator: Qingdao Metro Corporation
- Rolling stock: Chinese Type B1

History
- Opened: 10 December 2017; 8 years ago

Technical
- Line length: 24.387 km (15.153 mi)
- Number of tracks: 2
- Character: Underground
- Track gauge: 1,435 mm (4 ft 8 1/2 in)
- Electrification: Third rail 1,500 V DC

Line 2 of Qingdao Metro (Chinese: 青岛地铁2号线) is an underground metro line in Qingdao, in the eastern Shandong Province of China.

== History ==
The eastern section was opened on 10 December 2017 with 18 stations from Zhiquan Road to Licun Park.

The western section from Zhiquan Road station to Taishan Road station opened on 16 December 2019. Haixin Bridge station opened on 30 June 2023.

The construction of a 3.84 km (2.39 mi) extension from Taishan Road station to Sichuan Road (Qingdao Ferry Terminal) station started on October 26, 2019. It opened on 18 December 2024.

== Opening timeline ==
Segment	Commencement	Length	Station(s)	Name
Zhiquan Road — Licun Park	10 December 2017	20.422 km (12.690 mi)	18	Phase 1 (Eastern section)
Taishan Road — Zhiquan Road	16 December 2019	4.2 km (2.610 mi)	3	Phase 1 (Western section)
Haixin Bridge	30 June 2023	Infill station	1	Phase 1 (Western section)
Sichuan Road (Qingdao Ferry Terminal) — Taishan Road	18 December 2024	3.84 km (2.386 mi)	3	Phase 1 (Western section extension)

== Stations ==
Station name		Connections	Distance km		Location
English	Chinese	Connections	Distance km		Location
Sichuan Road (Qingdao Ferry Terminal)	四川路（轮渡）				Shinan
Xiaogang	小港				Shibei
Qingdao International Cruise Terminal	国际游轮港				Shibei
Taishan Road	泰山路	4	0.000	0.000	Shibei
Lijin Road	利津路	4 5	1.220	1.220	Shibei
Taidong	台东	1	0.769	1.989	Shibei
Haixin Bridge	海信桥		1.104	3.093	Shibei
Zhiquan Road	芝泉路		0.872	3.965	Shinan
May 4th Square	五四广场	3 8	1.555	5.520	Shinan
Fushansuo	浮山所		0.928	6.448	Shinan
Qingdao Central Legal-Services District (Yan'erdao Road)	青岛中央法务区（燕儿岛路）	7	1.038	7.486	Shinan
Gaoxiong Road	高雄路		0.802	8.288	Shinan
Maidao	麦岛	5	1.160	9.448	Laoshan
Haiyou Road	海游路		1.156	10.604	Laoshan
Haichuan Road	海川路		1.005	11.609	Laoshan
Hai'an Road	海安路		1.225	12.834	Laoshan
Shilaoren Beach	石老人浴场	5	1.547	14.381	Laoshan
Miaoling Road	苗岭路	Oceantec Valley	1.043	15.424	Laoshan
Tong'an Road	同安路		1.496	16.920	Laoshan
Liaoyang East Road	辽阳东路	4	0.815	17.735	Laoshan
Donghan	东韩		1.483	19.218	Laoshan
Hualoushan Road	华楼山路		2.255	21.473	Licang
Zaoshan Road	枣山路		0.906	22.379	Licang
Licun	李村	3	1.071	23.450	Licang
Licun Park	李村公园		0.937	24.387	Licang
Xiawangbu (Shandong Foreign Trade Vocational College)	下王埠（外贸学院）	15			Licang
Fo'erya	佛耳崖				Licang
Changjian	长涧				Licang
Shangzang	上臧				Licang
Lijiashangliu (East Campus of Qingdao Eighth People's Hospital)	李家上流（八医东院区）				Licang
Nanwangjiashangliu	南王家上流				Licang
Bijiashangliu	毕家上流				Licang
International Horticulture Expo Garden	世博园	Oceantec Valley			Laoshan

== Future Development ==
An eastern extension is under construction to International Horticulture Expo Garden, and expected to open in 2026.
