= Shilaoren Beach station =

Qingdao Metro station

Shilaoren Beach 石老人浴场
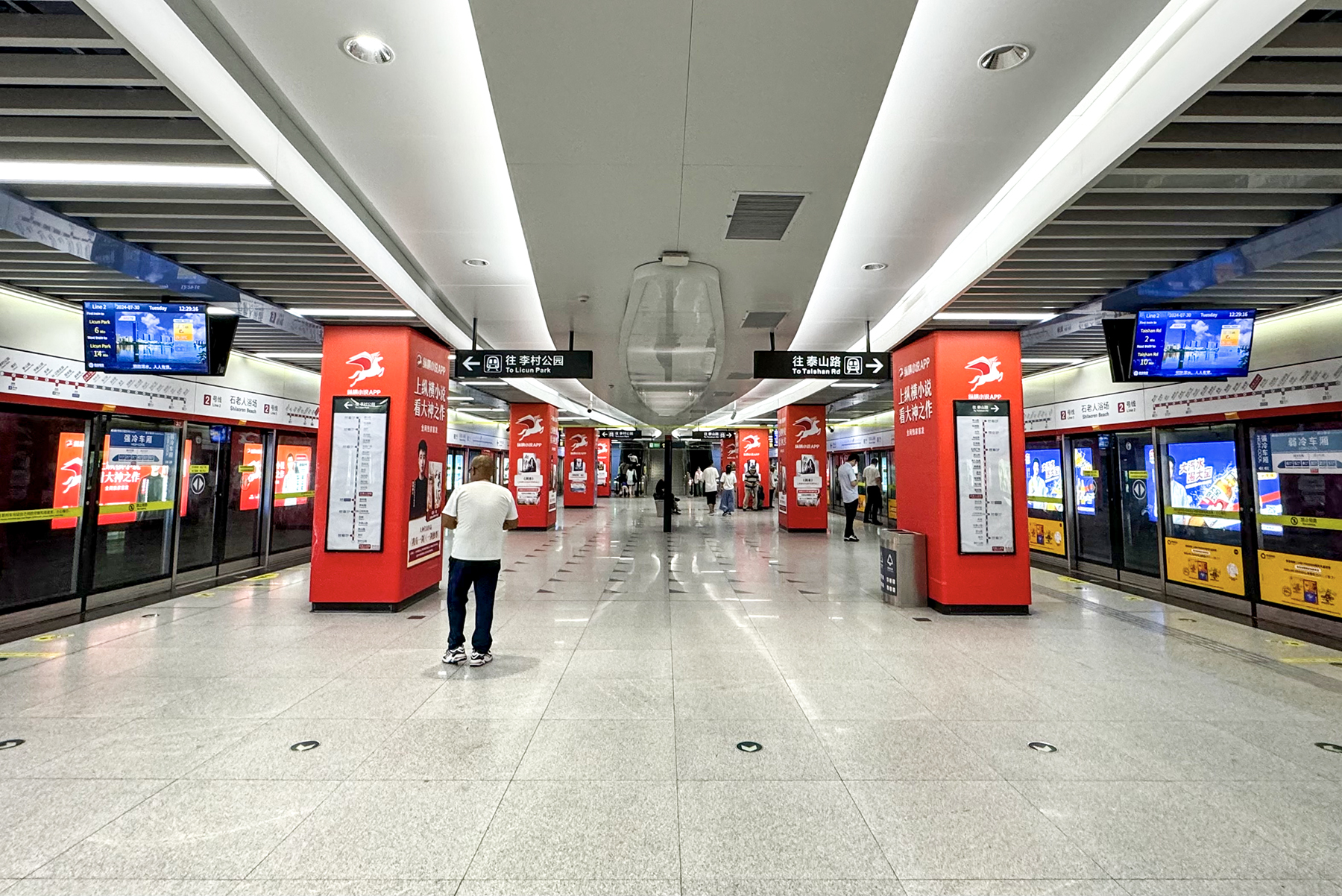

General information
- Location: Laoshan District, Qingdao, Shandong; China
- Coordinates: 36.0932°N 120.4598°E
- Operator: Qingdao Metro Corporation
- Line: Line 2
- Platforms: 2 (1 island platform)

History
- Opened: 10 December 2017; 8 years ago

Services
Preceding station	Qingdao Metro	Following station
Hai'an Road towards Sichuan Road (Qingdao Ferry Terminal)	Line 2	Miaoling Road towards Licun Park
Location

Shilaoren Beach (Chinese: 石老人浴场) is a station on Line 2 of the Qingdao Metro. It opened on 10 December 2017.

== Gallery ==
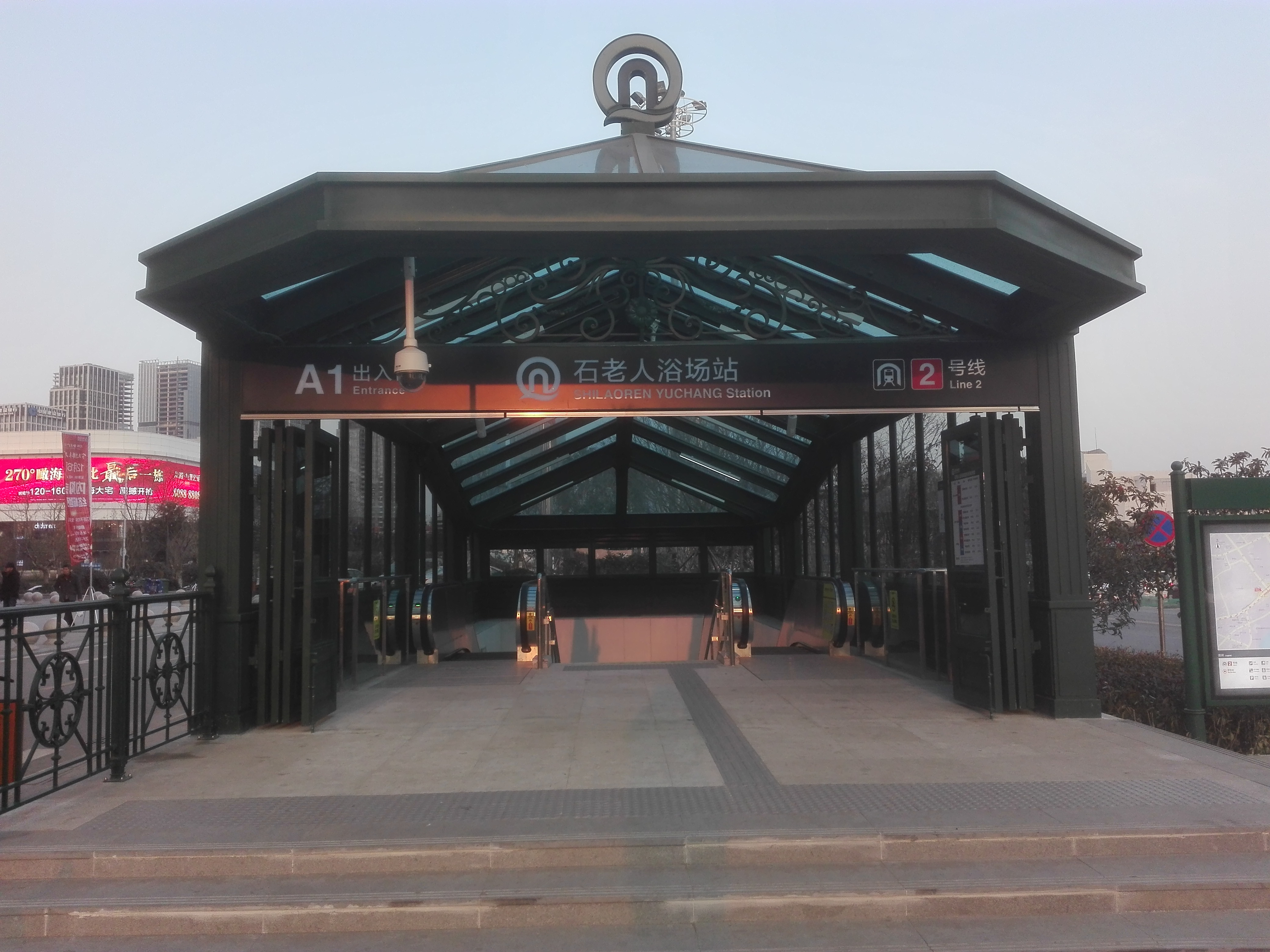
Entrance A1

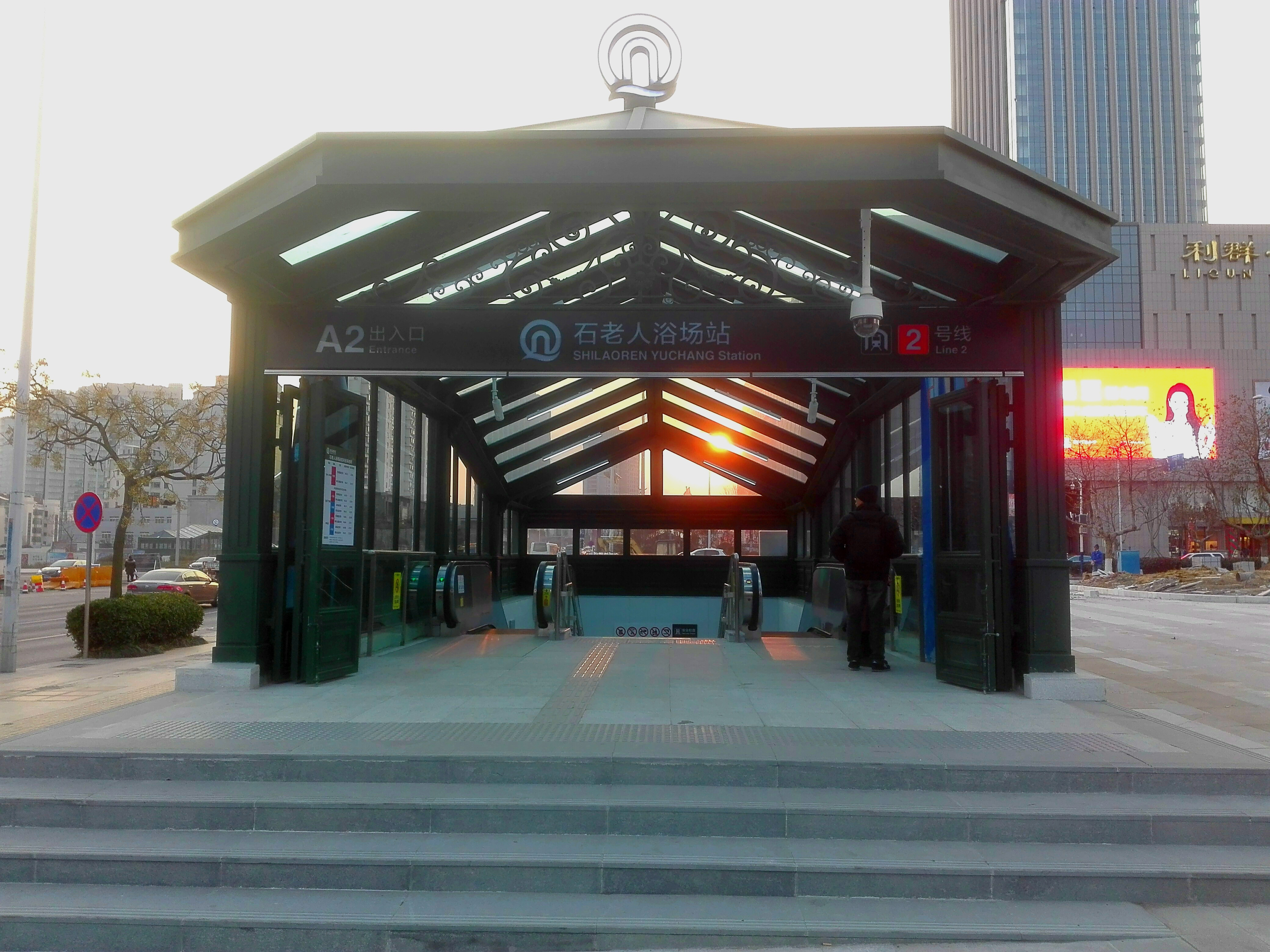
Entrance A2

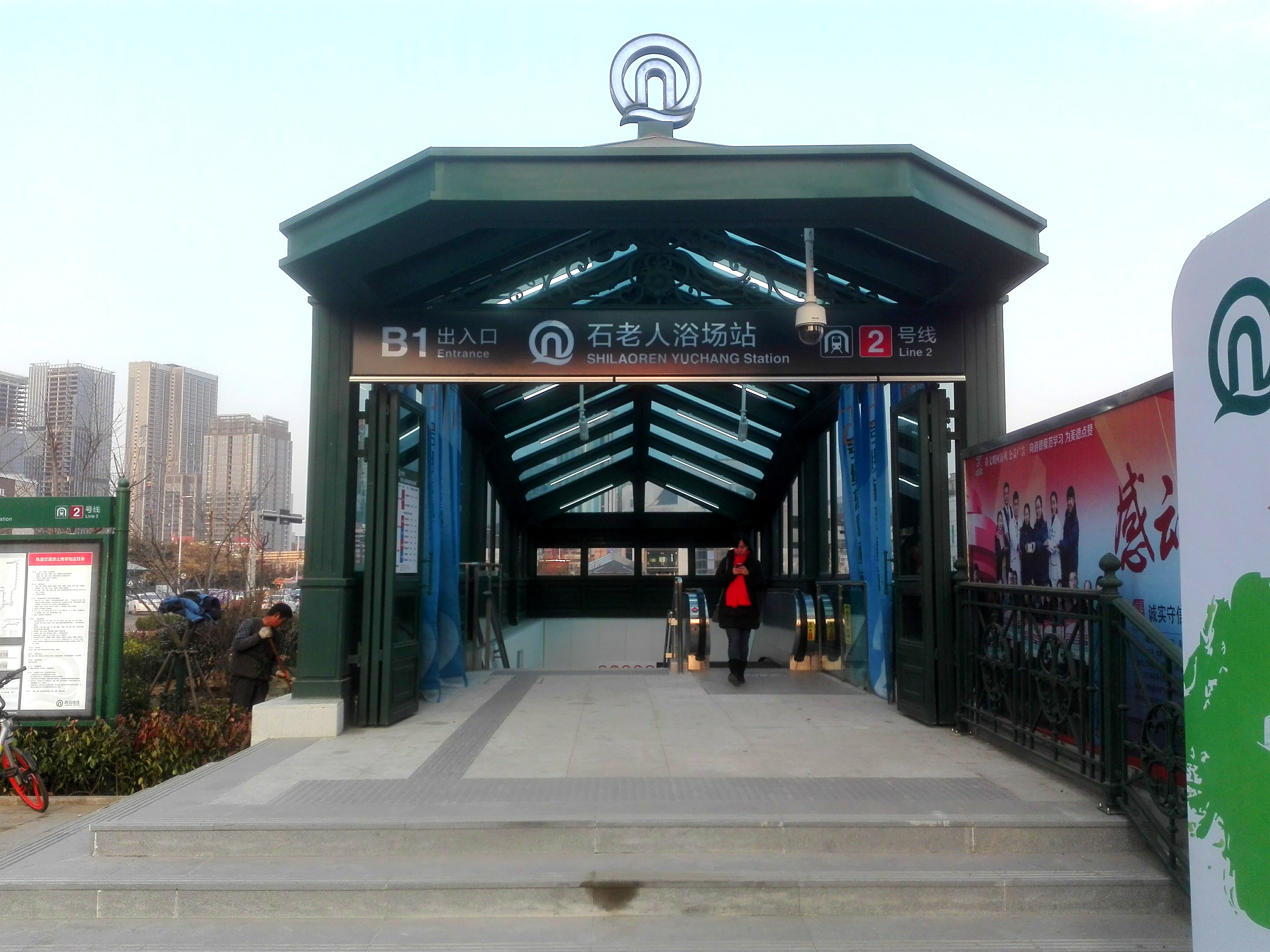
Entrance B1

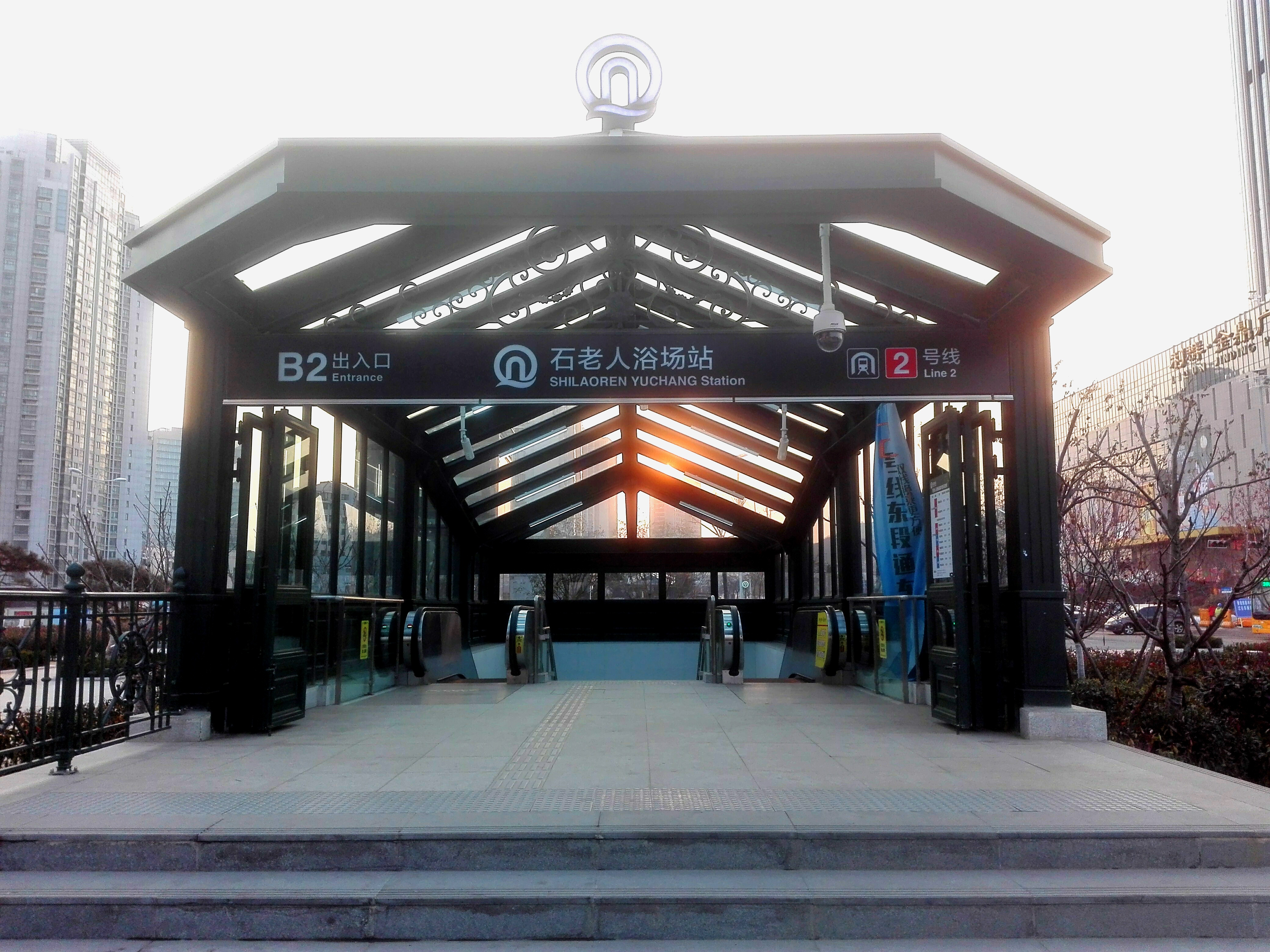
Entrance B2
