= Maidao station =

Qingdao Metro station

Maidao 麦岛
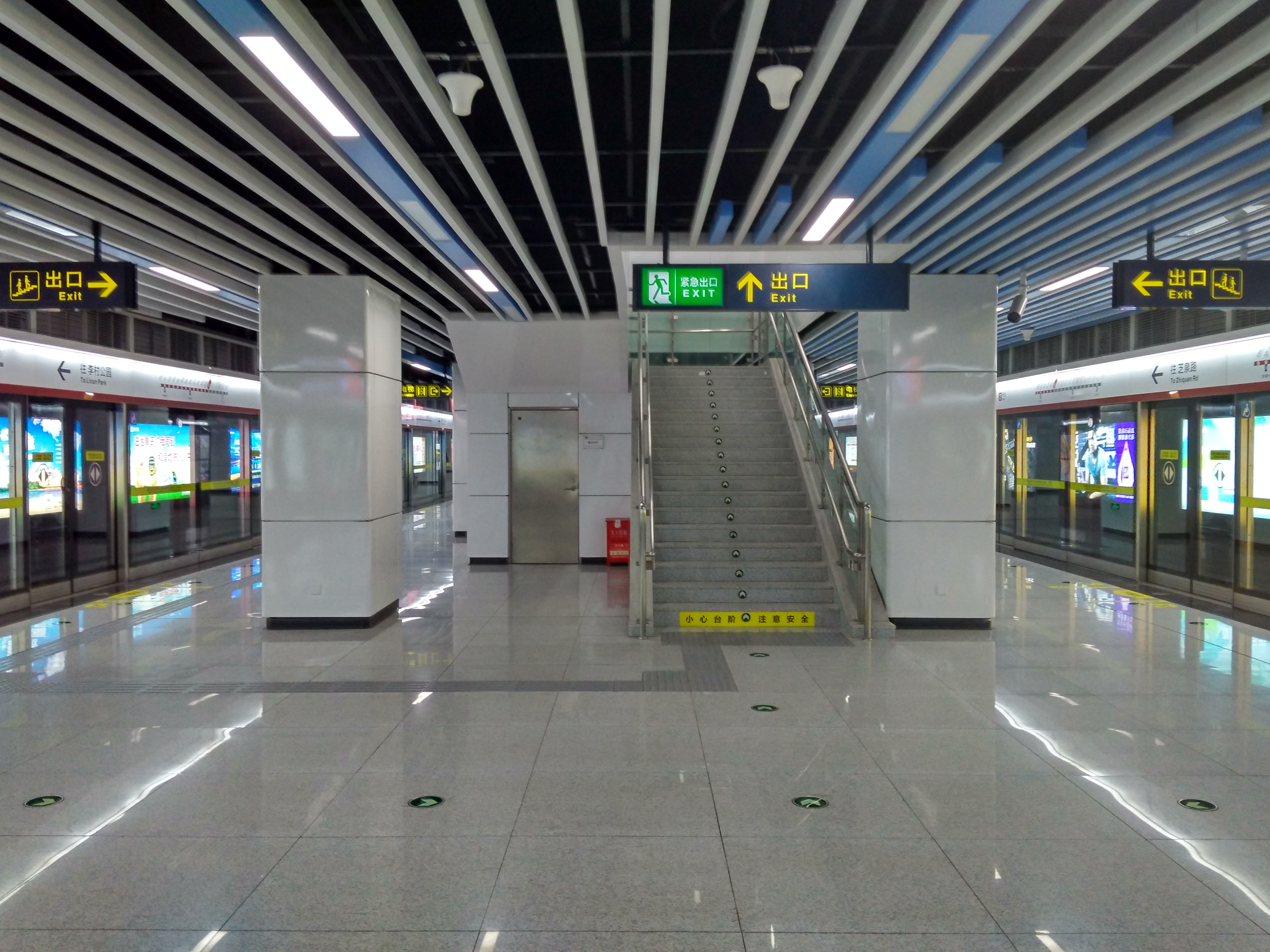

General information
- Location: Shinan District, Qingdao, Shandong; China
- Operated by: Qingdao Metro Corporation
- Line: Line 2
- Platforms: 2 (1 island platform)

History
- Opened: 10 December 2017; 8 years ago

Services
Preceding station	Qingdao Metro	Following station
Gaoxiong Road towards Taishan Road	Line 2	Haiyou Road towards Licun Park
Location

Maidao (Chinese: 麦岛) is a station on Line 2 of the Qingdao Metro. It opened on 10 December 2017.

== Gallery ==
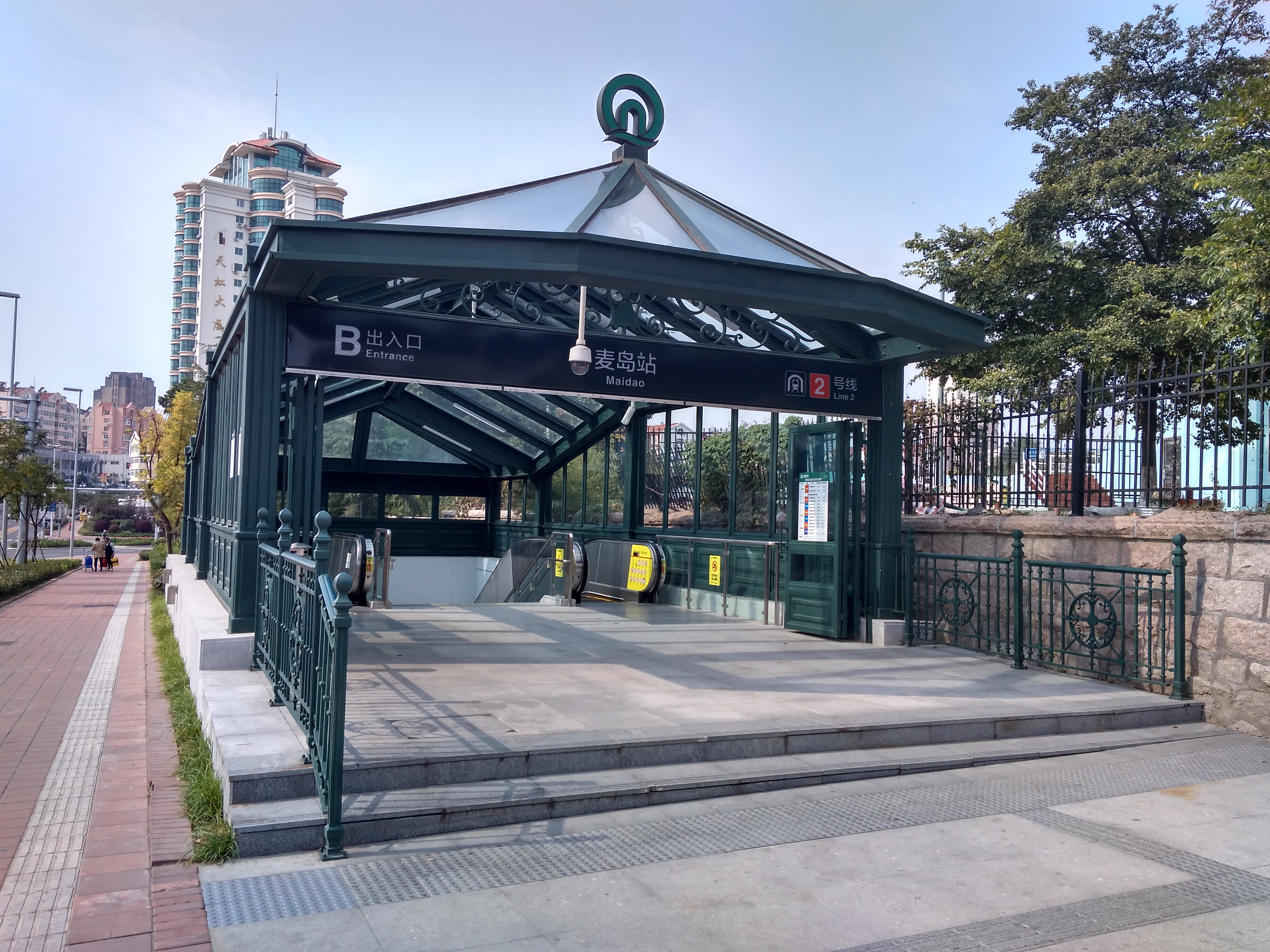
Entrance B

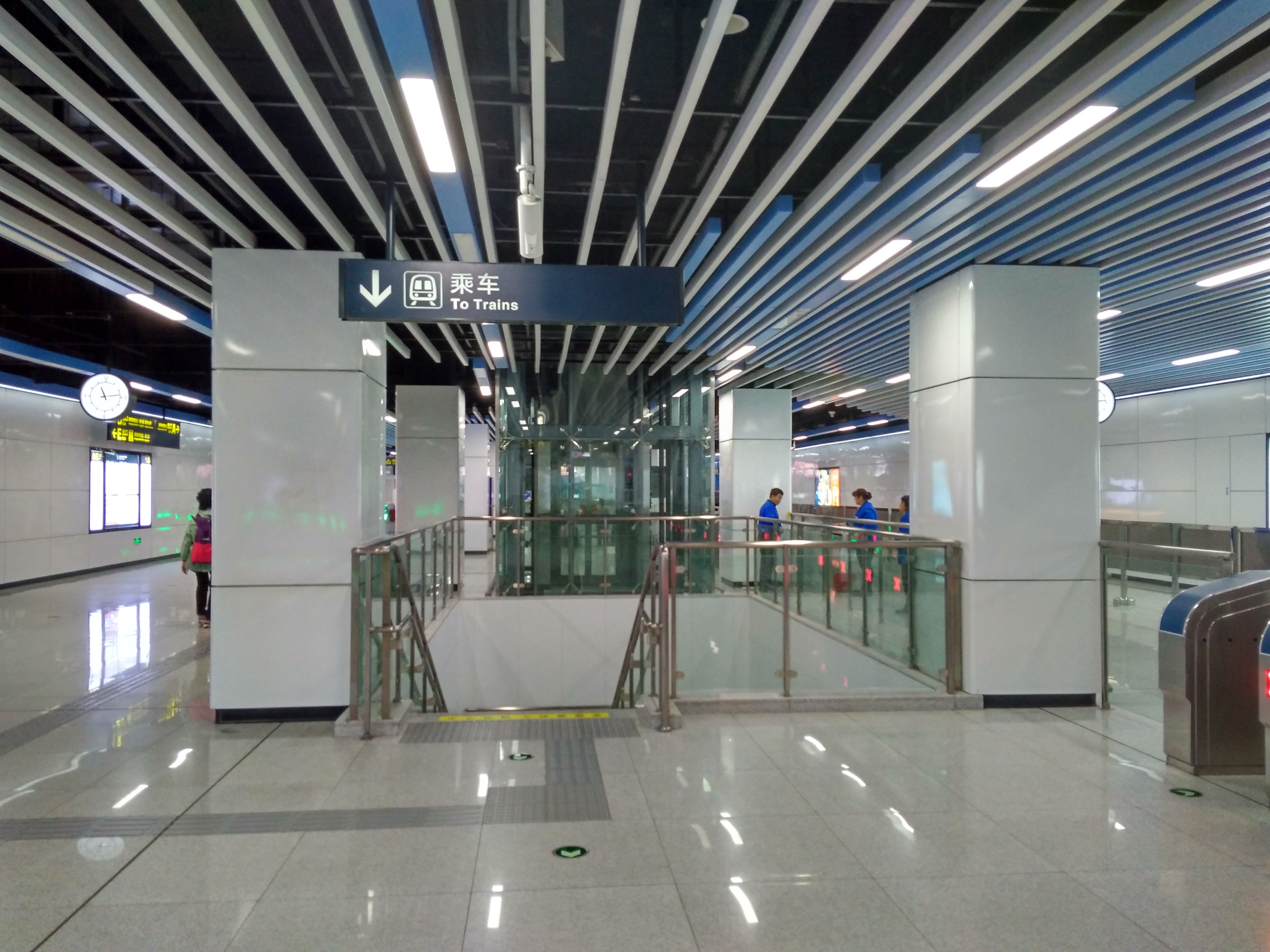
Concourse
