= Haichuan Road station =

Qingdao Metro station

Haichuan Road 海川路
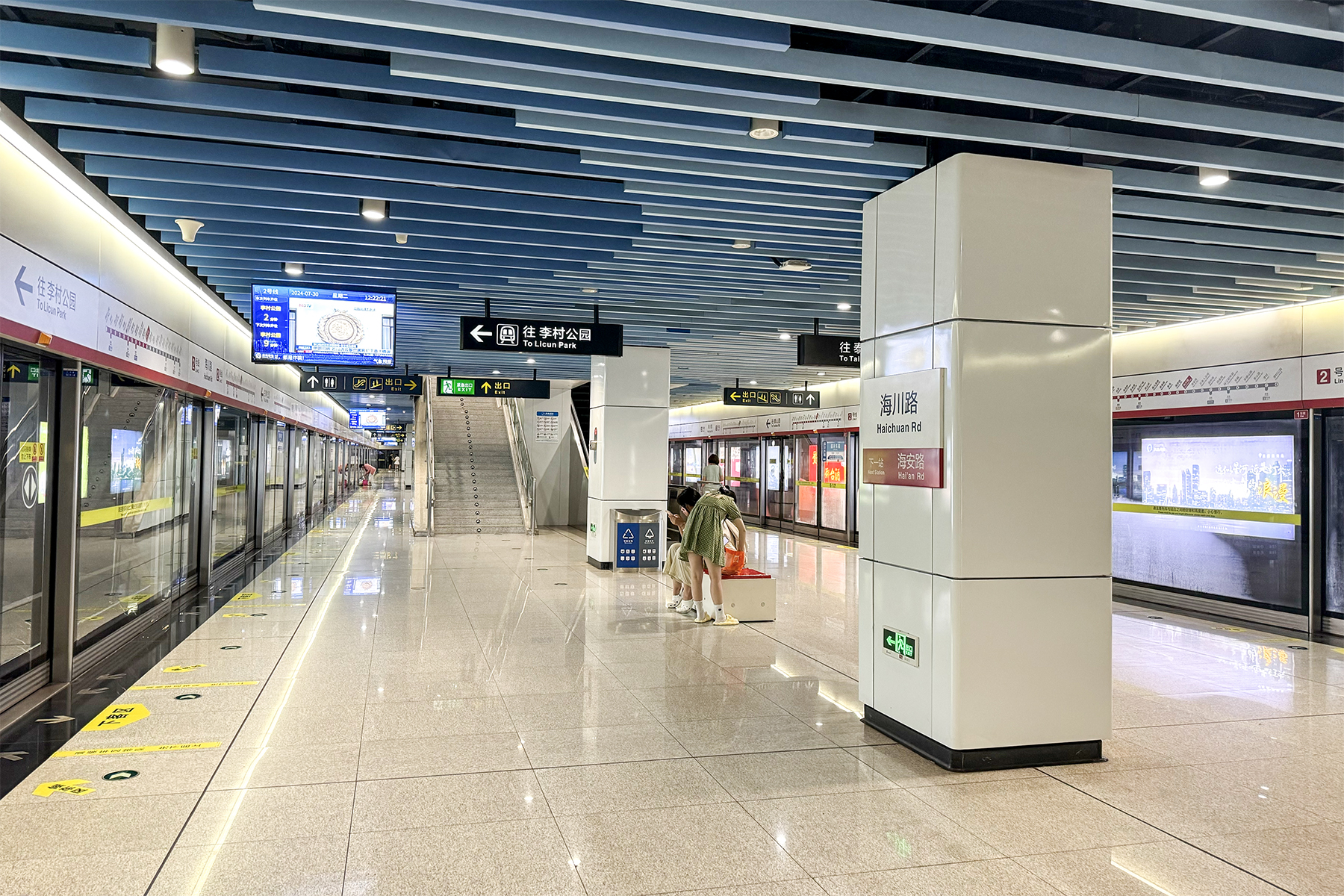

General information
- Location: Laoshan District, Qingdao, Shandong; China
- Coordinates: 36.0762°N 120.4384°E
- Operator: Qingdao Metro Corporation
- Line: Line 2
- Platforms: 2 (1 island platform)

History
- Opened: 10 December 2017; 8 years ago

Services
Preceding station	Qingdao Metro	Following station
Haiyou Road towards Sichuan Road (Qingdao Ferry Terminal)	Line 2	Hai'an Road towards Licun Park
Location

Haichuan Road (Chinese: 海川路) is a station on Line 2 of the Qingdao Metro. It opened on 10 December 2017. It is a station located on line 2 of the Qingdao metro.

== Gallery ==
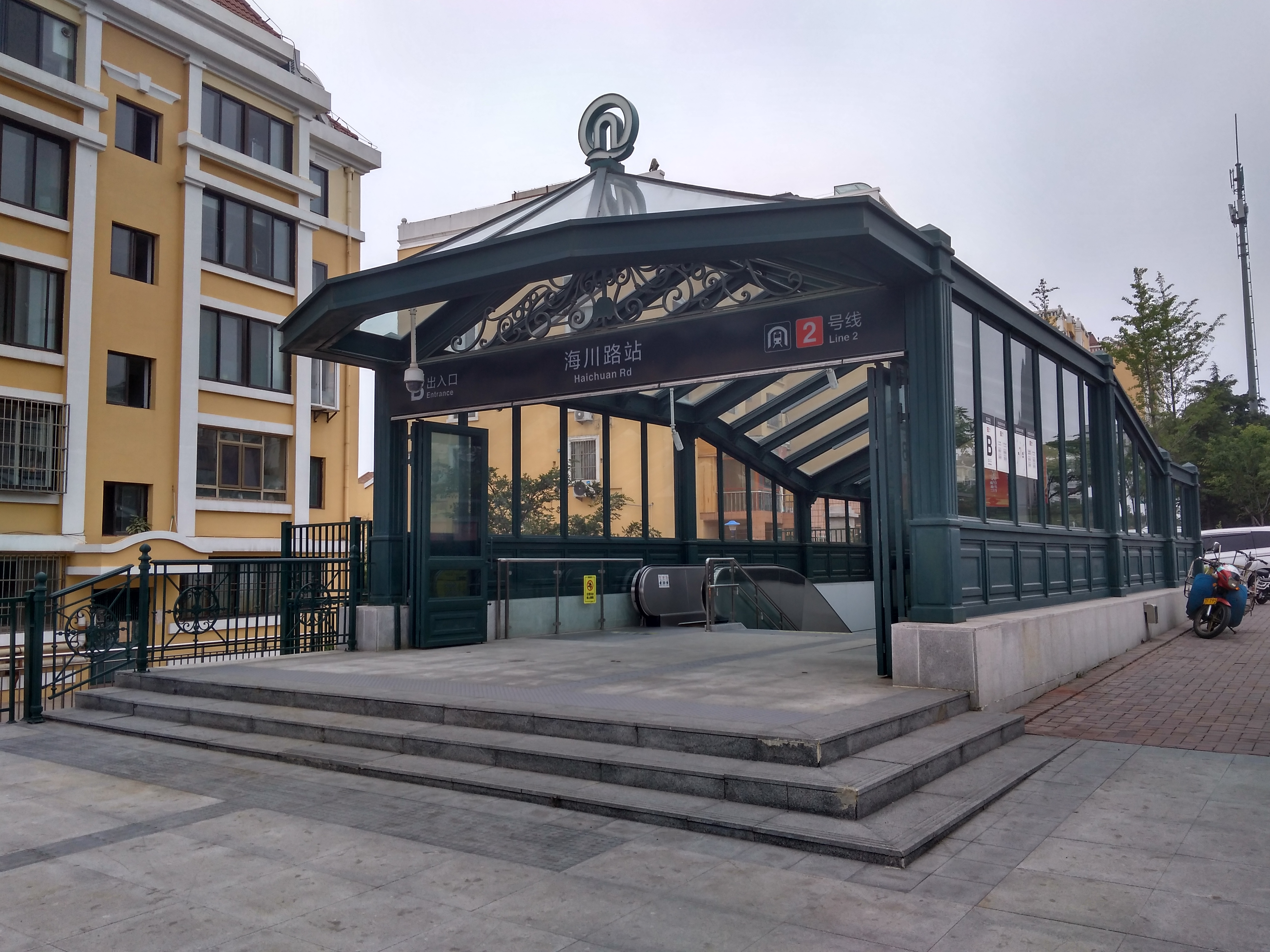
Entrance B

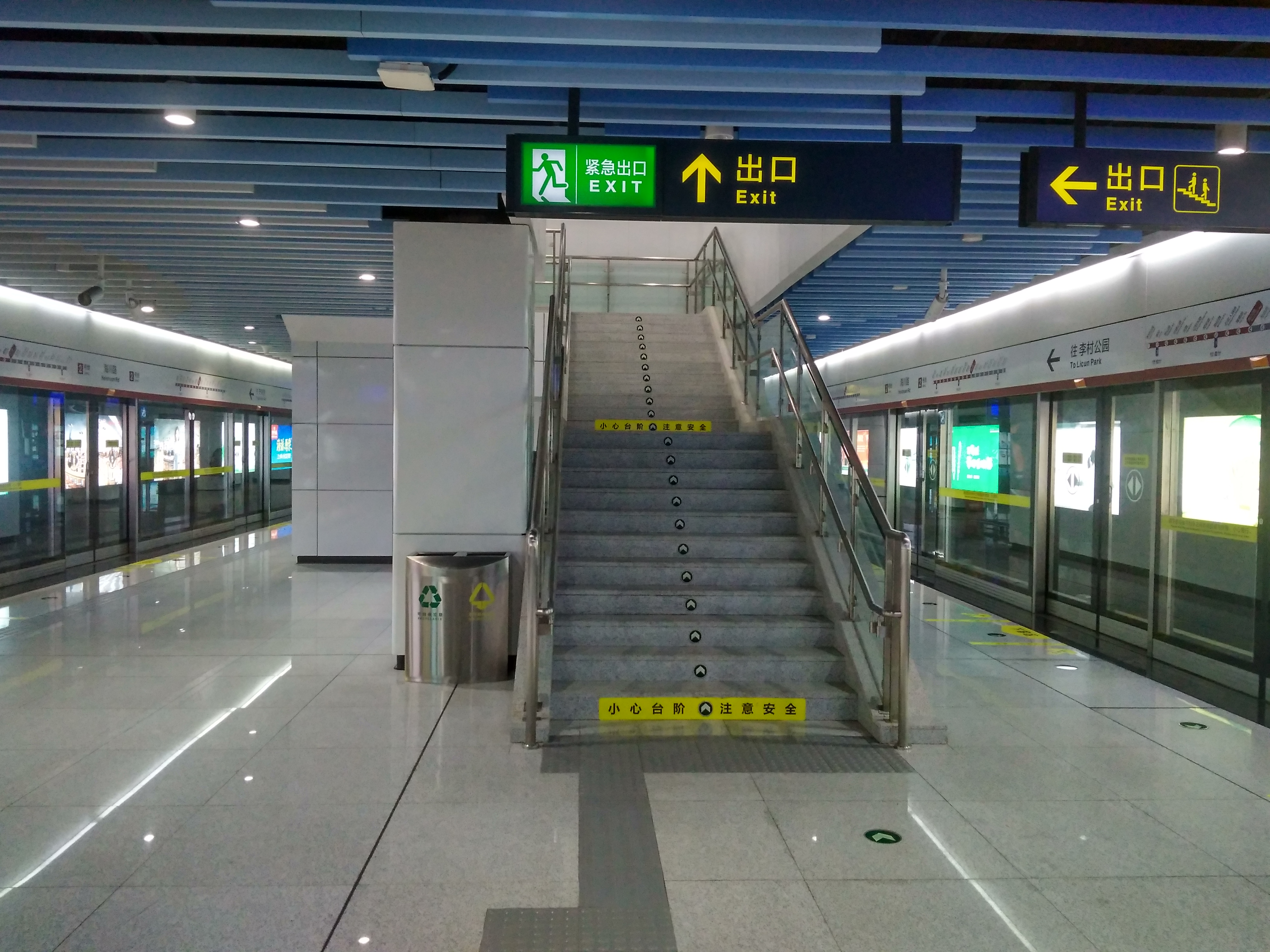
Platform
