= Zhiquan Road station =

Qingdao Metro station

Zhiquan Road 芝泉路
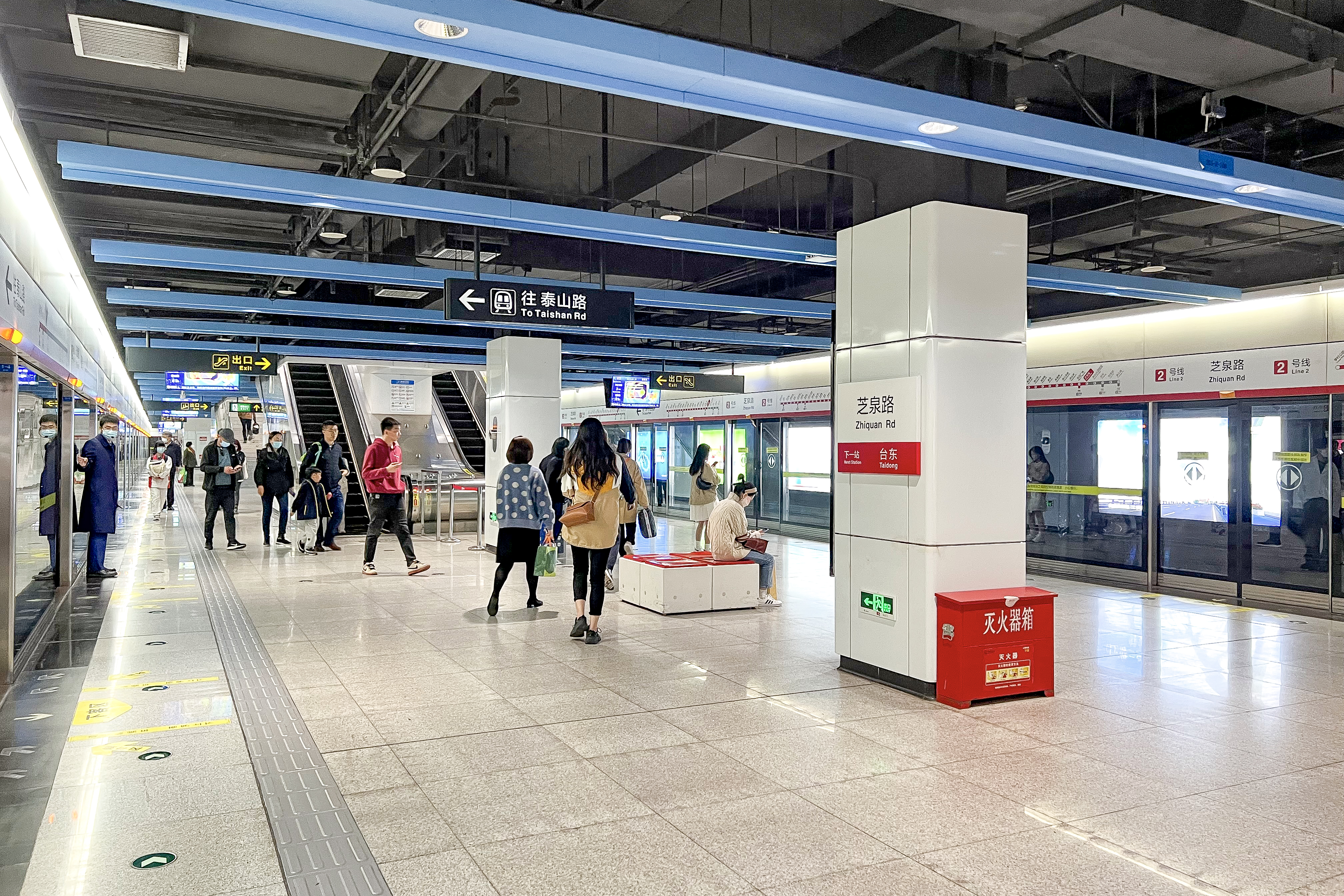

General information
- Location: Shinan District, Qingdao, Shandong; China
- Coordinates: 36.0692°N 120.36353°E
- Operated by: Qingdao Metro Corporation
- Line(s): Line 2
- Platforms: 2 (1 island platform)

History
- Opened: 10 December 2017; 7 years ago

Services
Preceding station	Qingdao Metro	Following station
Haixin Bridge towards Taishan Road	Line 2	May 4th Square towards Licun Park

Zhiquan Road (Chinese: 芝泉路) is a station on Line 2 of the Qingdao Metro. It opened on 10 December 2017.

== Gallery ==
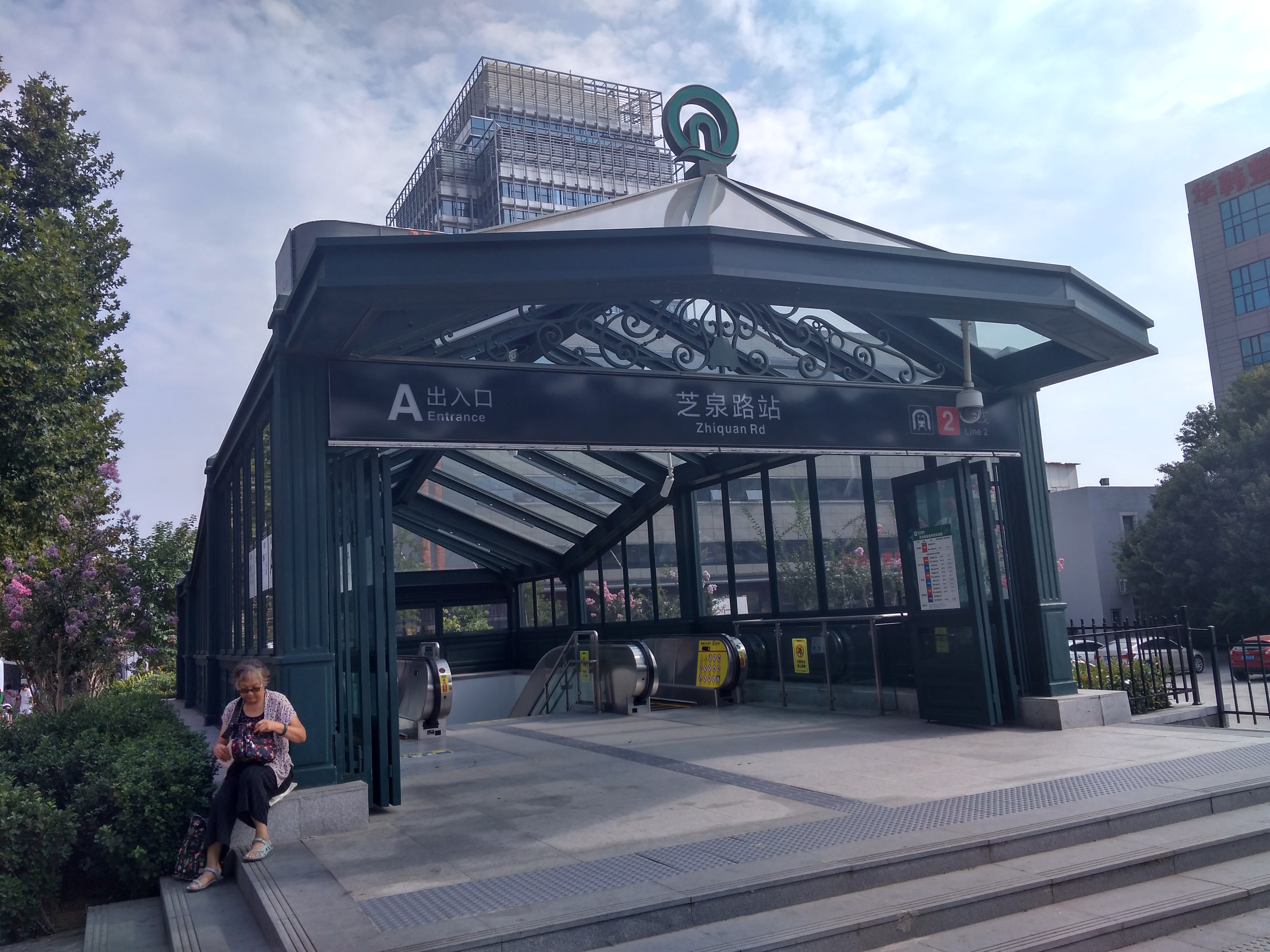
Entrance A

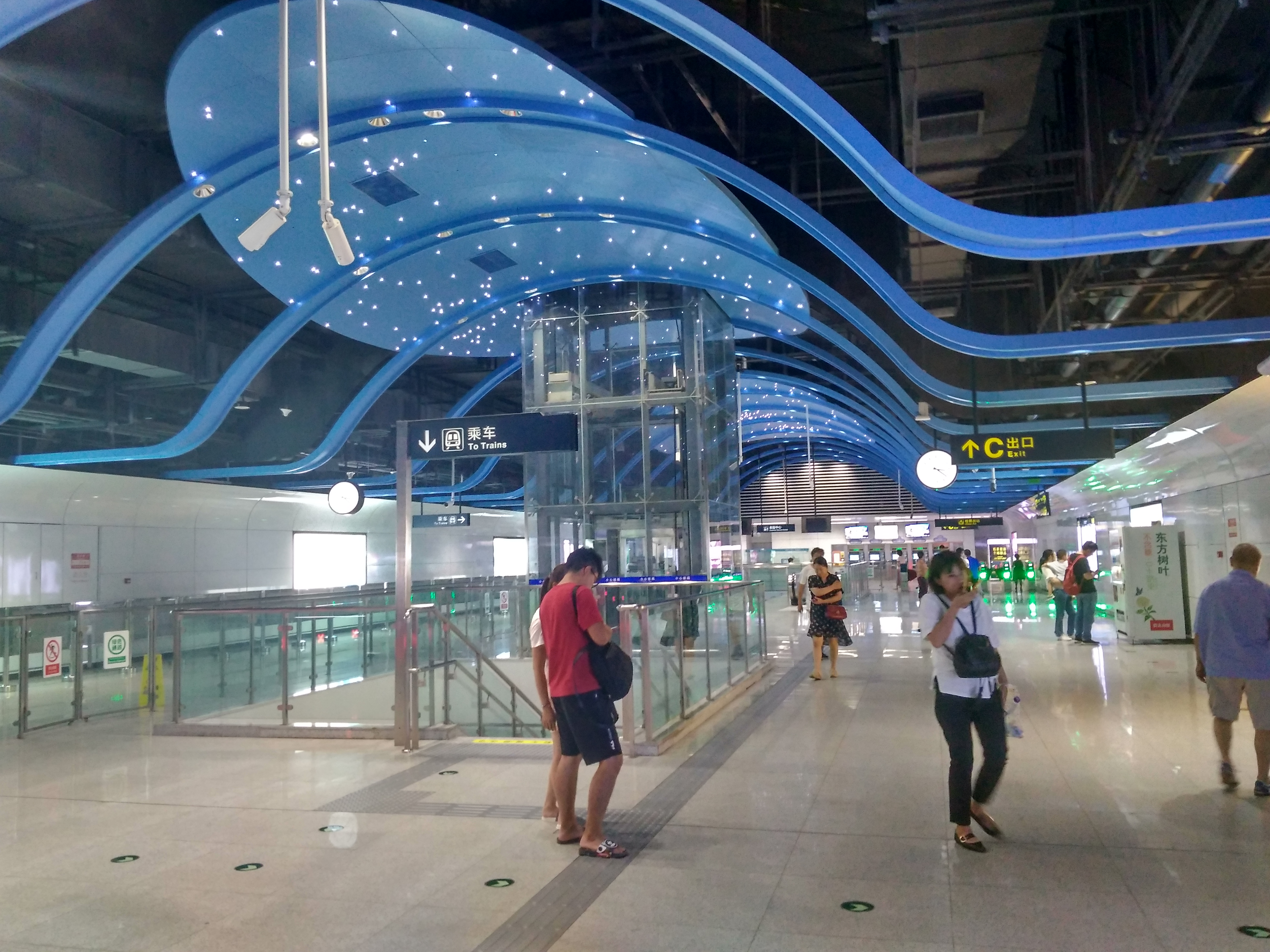
Concourse

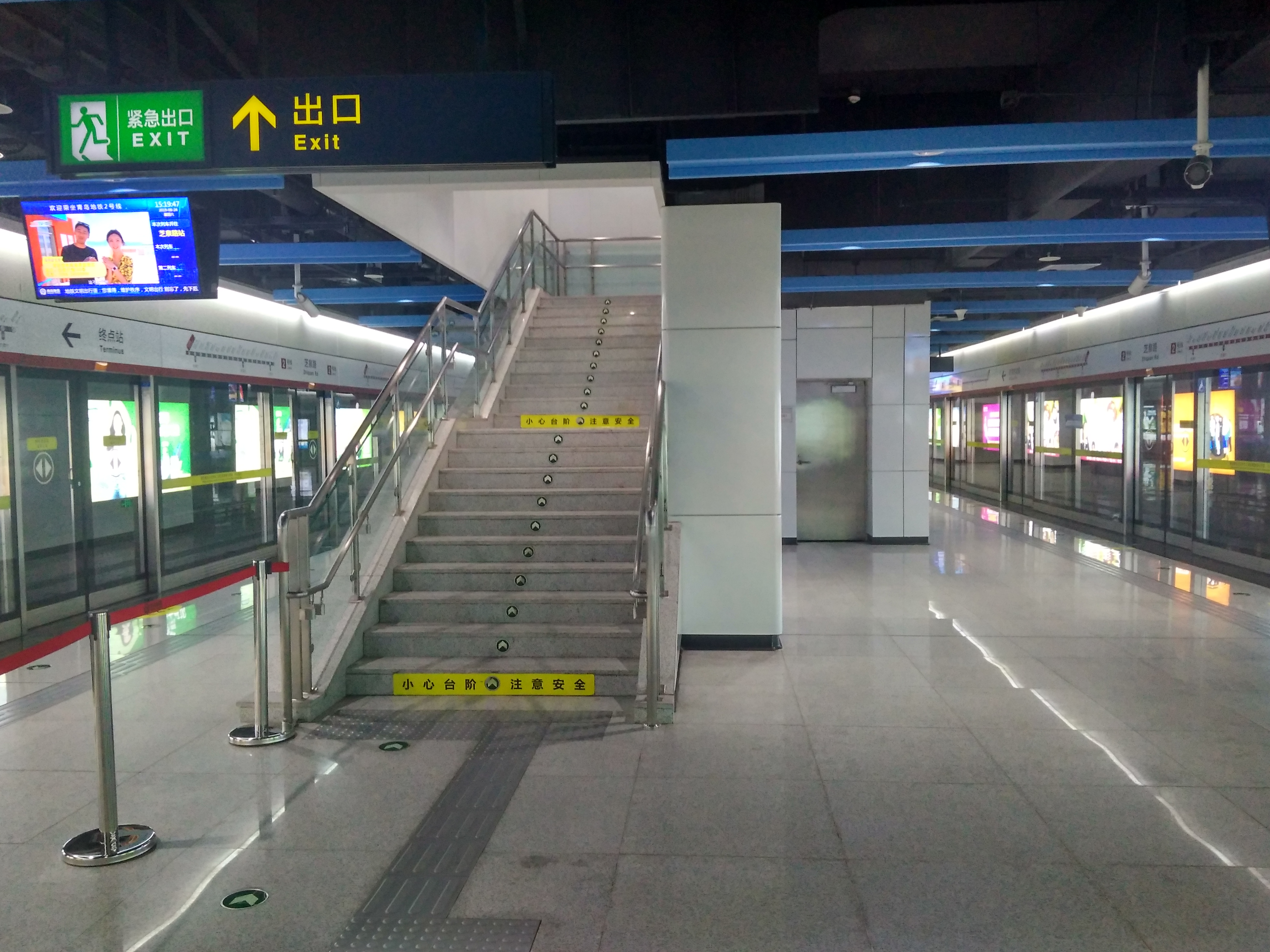
Platform
