= Gaoxiong Road station =

Qingdao Metro station

Gaoxiong Road 高雄路
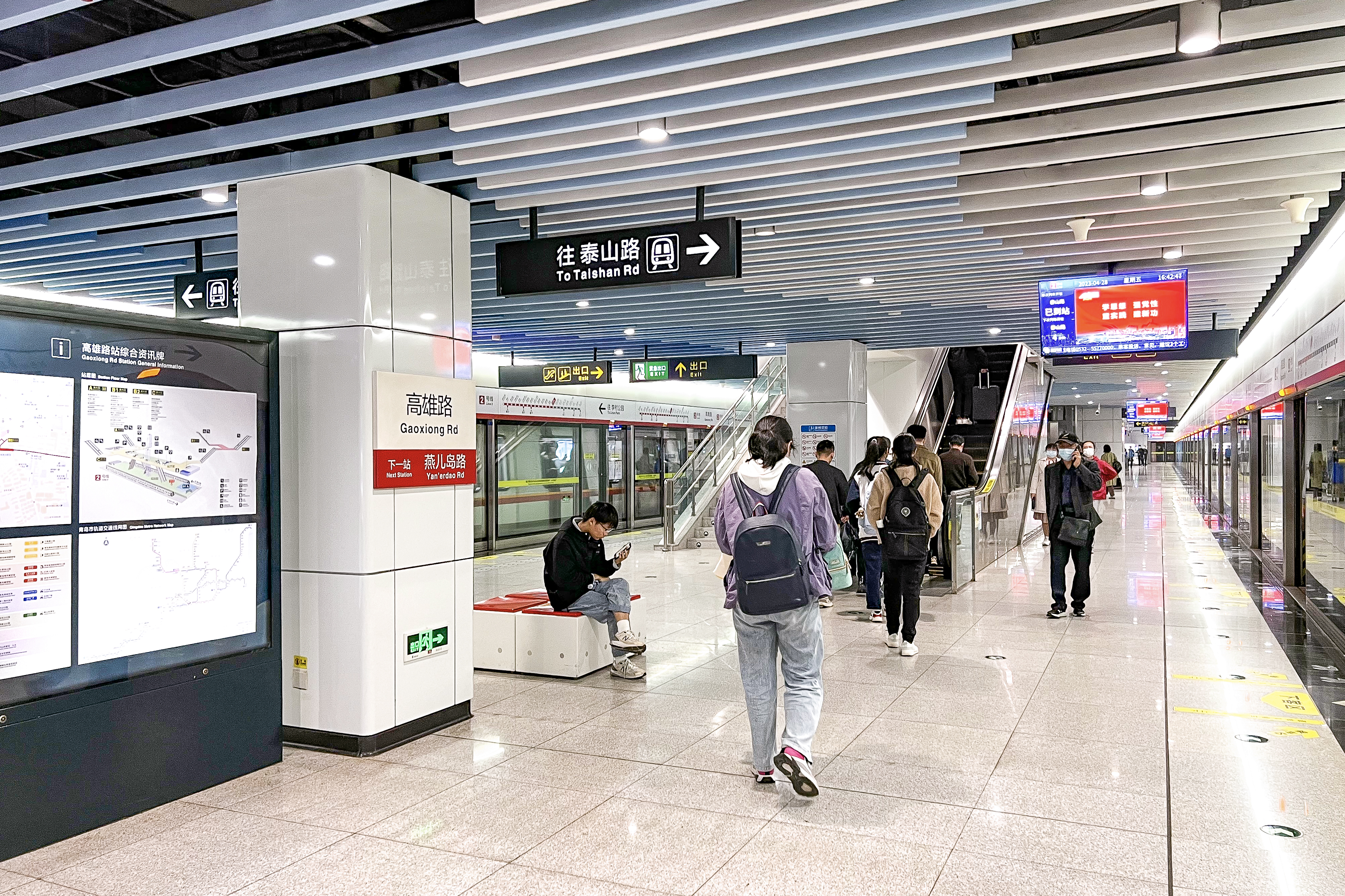

General information
- Location: Shinan District, Qingdao, Shandong; China
- Operated by: Qingdao Metro Corporation
- Line: Line 2
- Platforms: 2 (1 island platform)

History
- Opened: 10 December 2017; 8 years ago

Services
Preceding station	Qingdao Metro	Following station
Yan'erdao Road towards Taishan Road	Line 2	Maidao towards Licun Park
Location

Gaoxiong Road (Chinese: 高雄路) is a station on Line 2 of the Qingdao Metro. It opened on 10 December 2017.

== Gallery ==
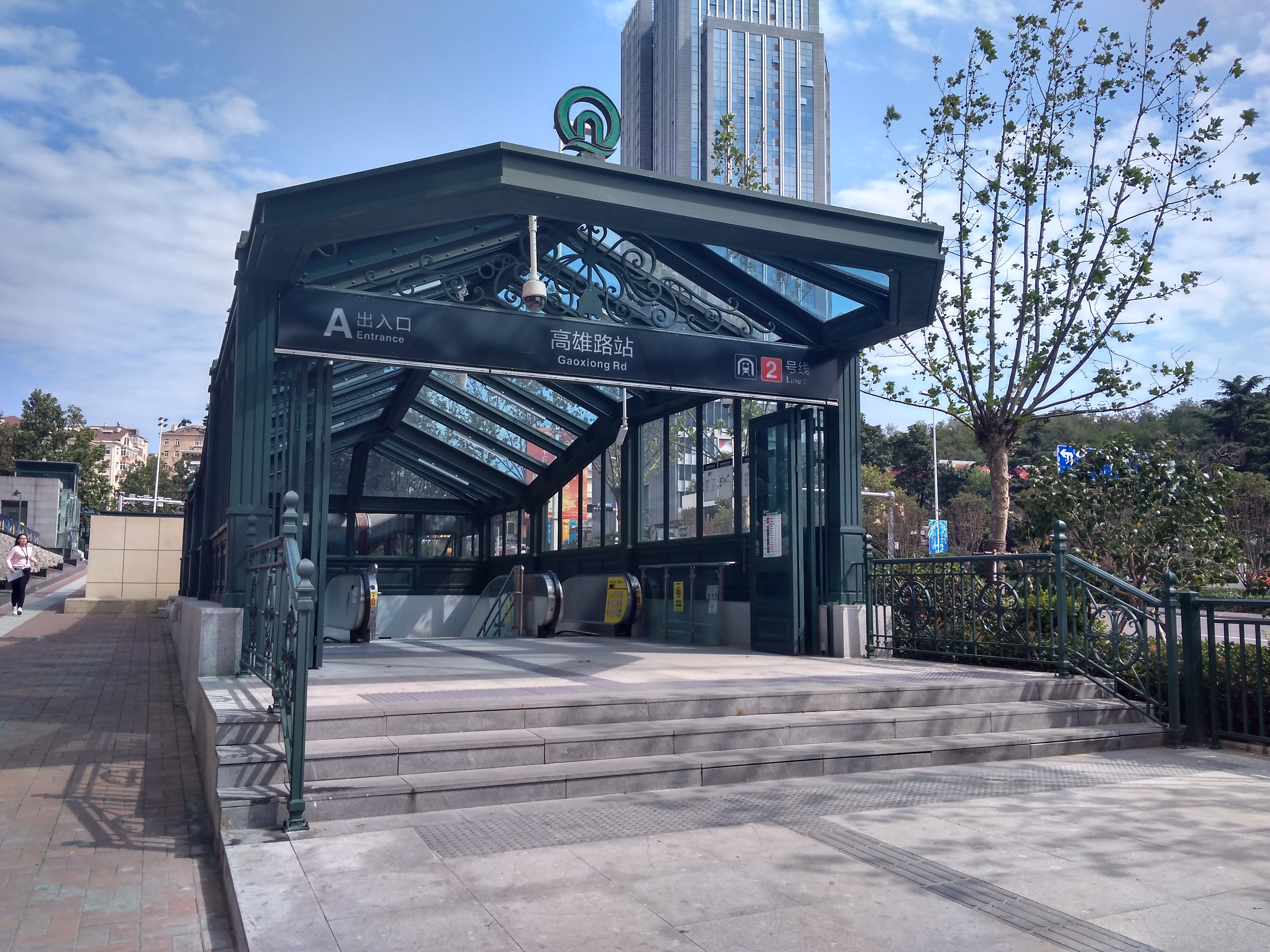
Entrance A

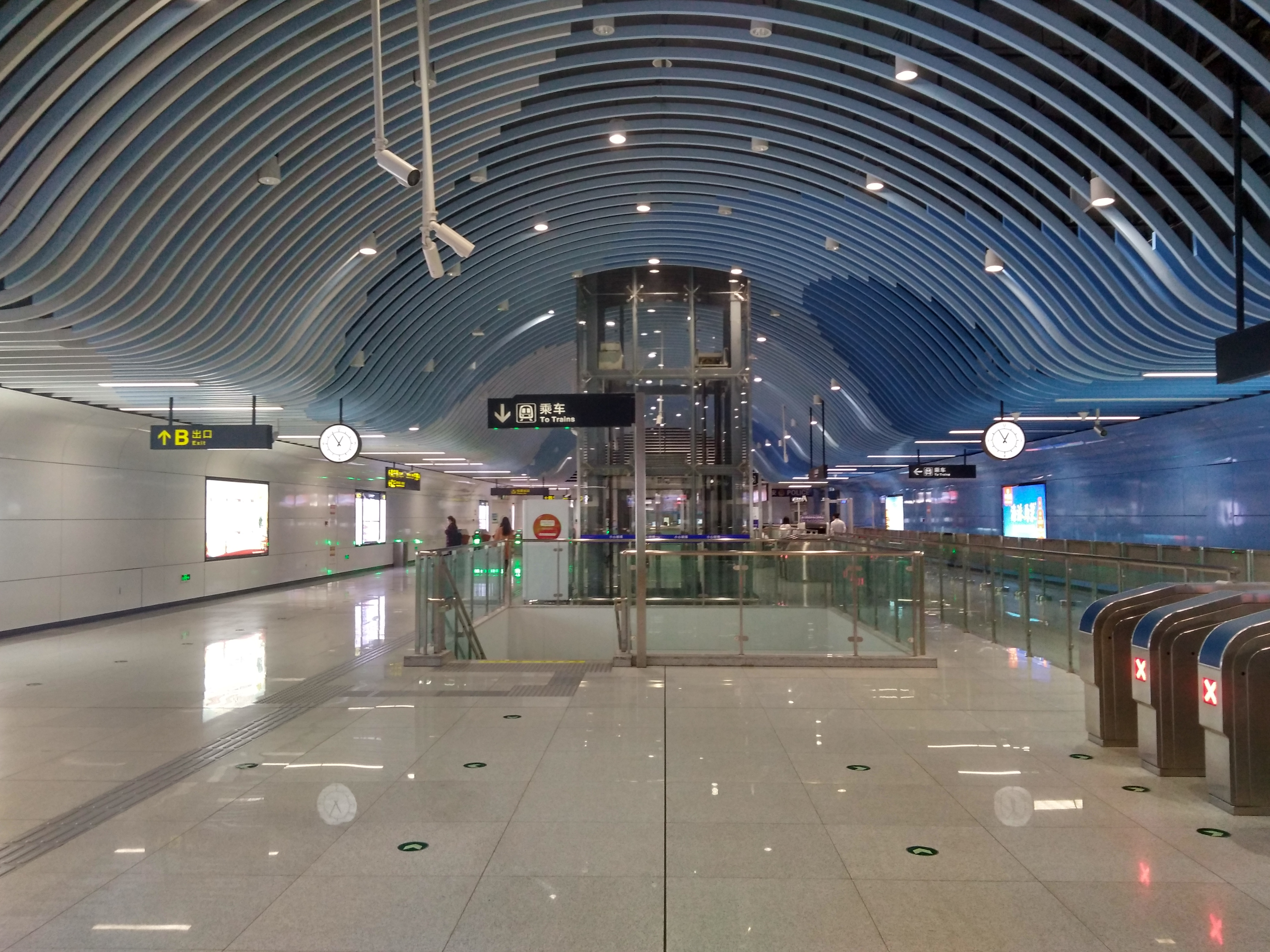
Concourse
