= Hai'an Road station =

Qingdao Metro station

Hai'an Road 海安路
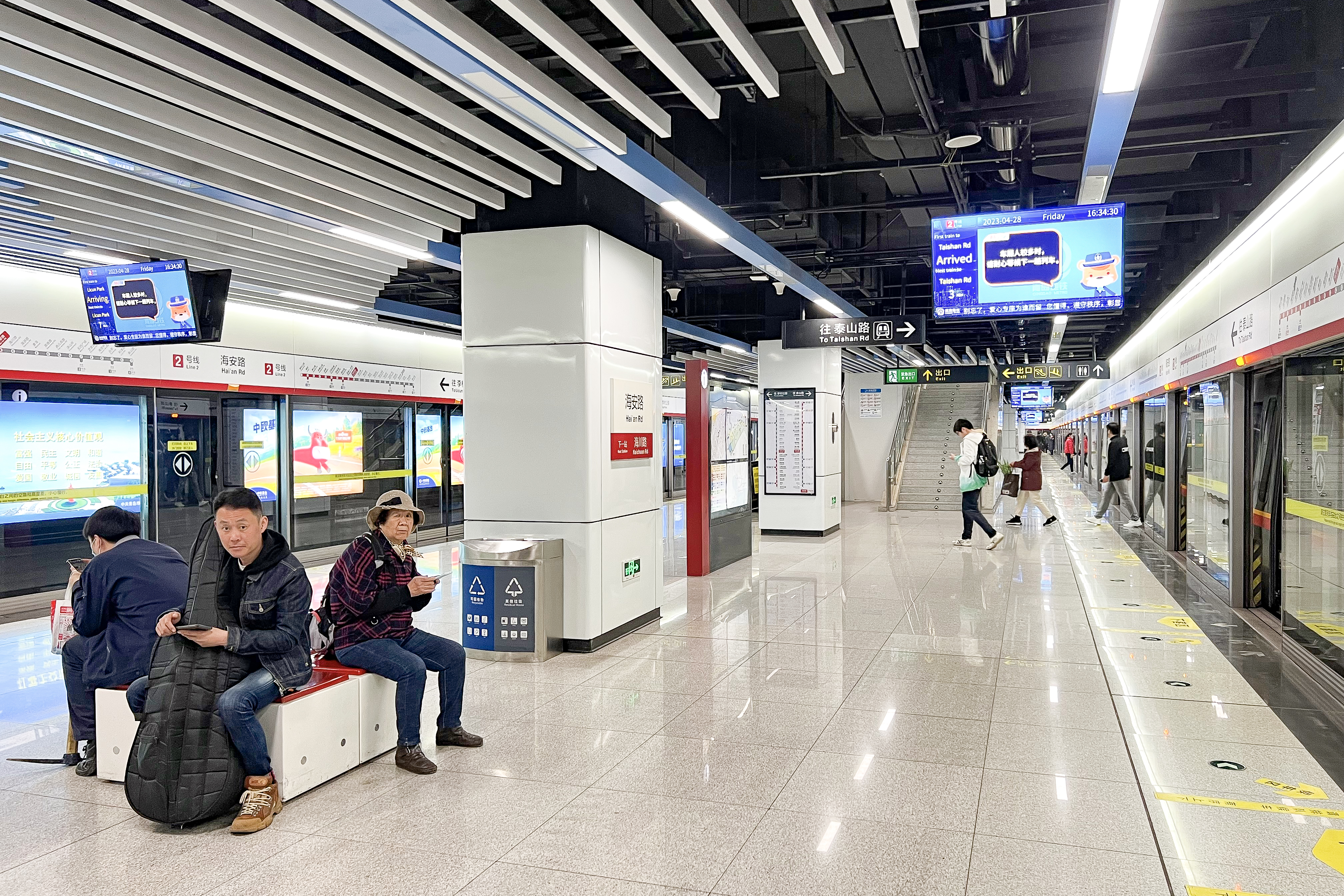

General information
- Location: Laoshan District, Qingdao, Shandong; China
- Coordinates: 36.0855°N 120.4458°E
- Operated by: Qingdao Metro Corporation
- Line: Line 2
- Platforms: 2 (1 island platform)

History
- Opened: 10 December 2017; 8 years ago

Services
| Preceding station | Qingdao Metro | Following station |
|---|---|---|
| Haichuan Road towards Sichuan Road (Qingdao Ferry Terminal) | Line 2 | Shilaoren Beach towards Licun Park |
Location

Hai'an Road (Chinese: 海安路) is a station on Line 2 of the Qingdao Metro. It opened on 10 December 2017.

== Gallery ==
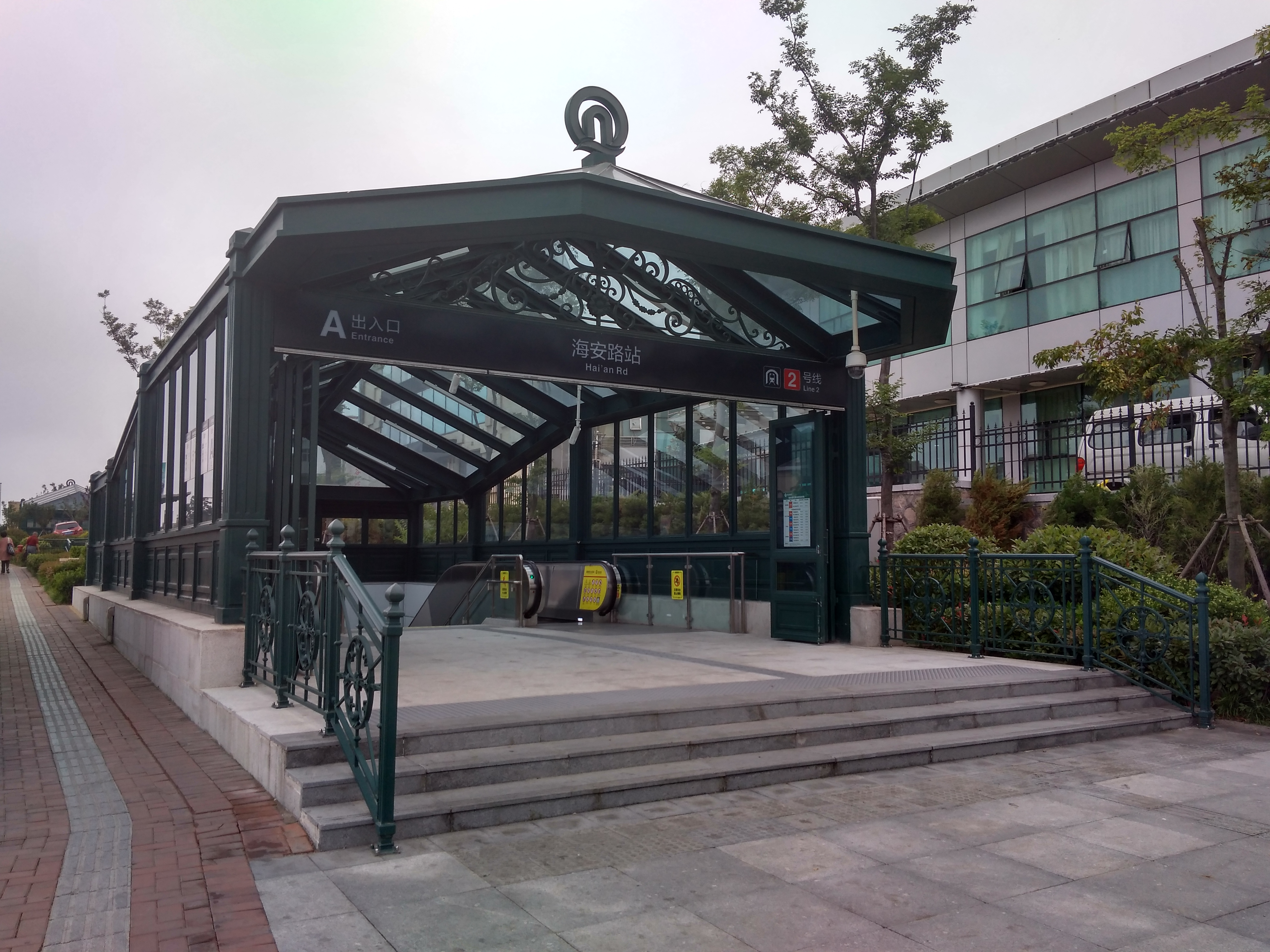
Entrance A

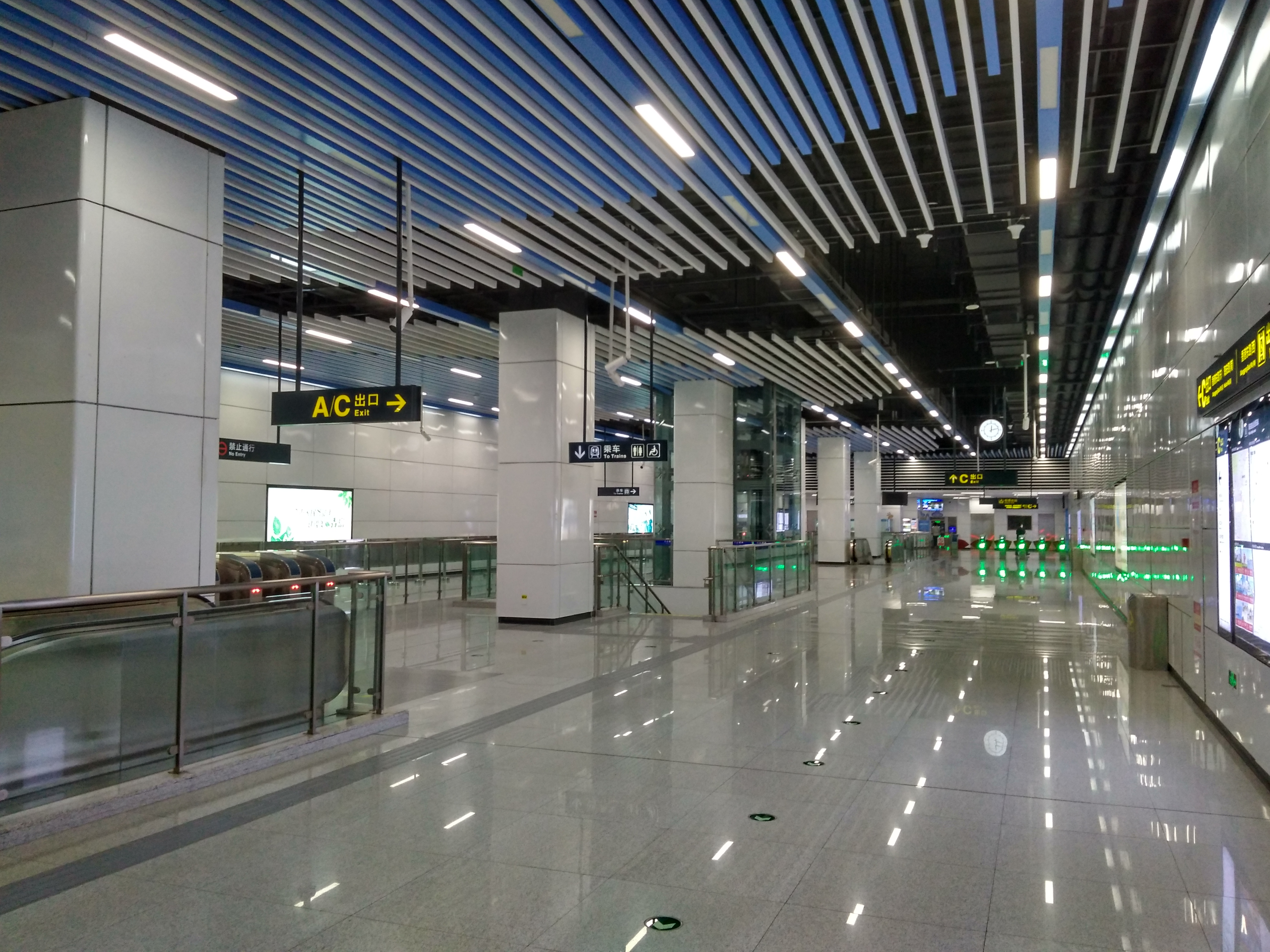
Concourse

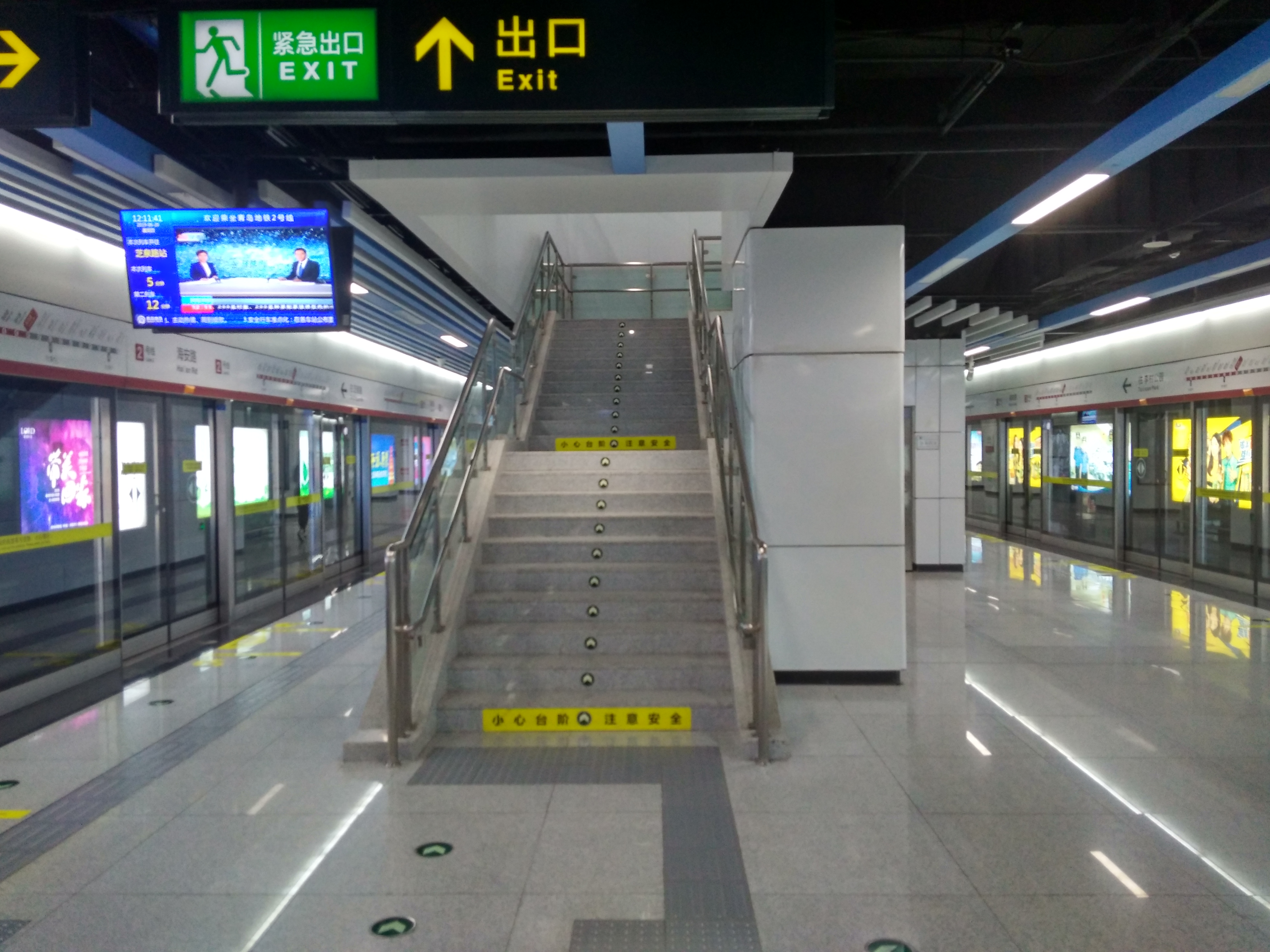
Platform
