= Haixin Bridge =

Haixin Bridge 海心桥
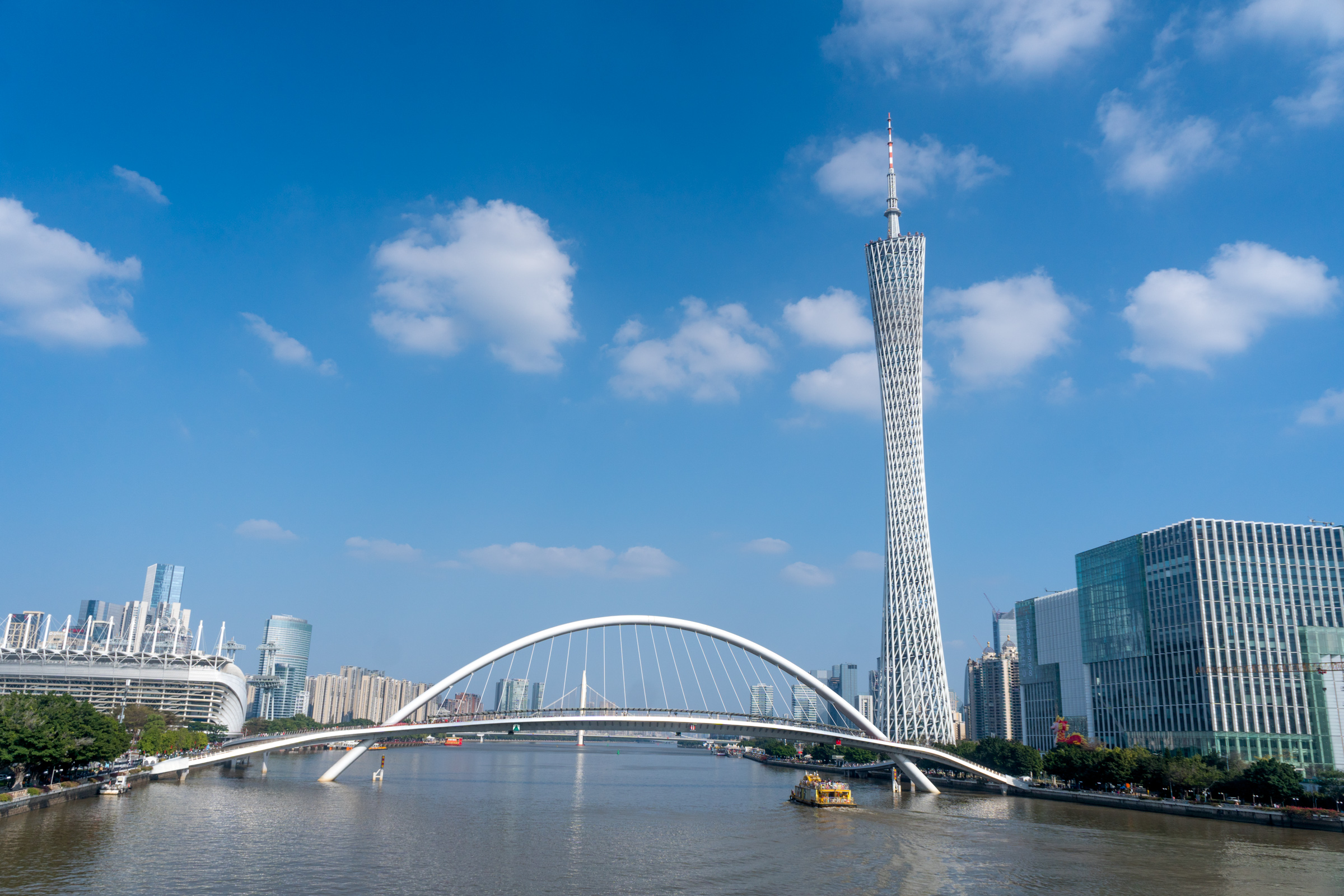
- Coordinates: 23°06′39″N 113°18′49″E
- Carries: Pedestrians
- Crosses: Pearl River
- Locale: Guangzhou, Guangdong, China
- Other name(s): "Little Phoenix Eye" (小凤眼), Flower Bridge (花桥; colloquial)
- Owner: Guangzhou Urban Construction Investment Group

Characteristics
- Design: Curved-beam skewed arch bridge (mid-support steel arch)
- Material: Steel (arch / main beam)
- Width: 15–20 m (central section ~20 m)
- Longest span: 198 m

History
- Designer: South China University of Technology Architectural Design & Research Institute; Guangzhou Municipal Engineering Design & Research Institute
- Constructed by: China Railway Guangzhou Engineering Bureau
- Construction start: April 2020
- Construction end: February 8, 2021 (closure of main span)
- Opened: 25 June 2021

Haixin Bridge (Chinese: 海心桥; sometimes nicknamed the "Little Phoenix Eye" or colloquially the "Flower Bridge") is a pedestrian bridge crossing the Pearl River in Guangzhou, Guangdong Province, China. The bridge links the eastern tip of Ersha Island in Yuexiu District to the area west of the Canton Tower in Haizhu District. It opened to the public on 25 June 2021.

== History ==
Planning for a pedestrian bridge connecting the Canton Tower area to Ersha Island began in late 2019 when municipal authorities solicited design proposals. Construction began in April 2020. Key milestones during construction included the installation of the first temporary trestle and pile works in May–June 2020 and the completion of the lower pier structures on both banks in December 2020. The bridge's main span was closed (i.e., the arch joined) on 8 February 2021. The bridge was officially opened and named "Haixin Bridge" on 25 June 2021 following a public naming process.

== Design ==
Haixin Bridge is a mid-support (through) curved-beam skewed steel arch bridge. The arch is tilted approximately 10° to the east. The main arch span measures 198 metres; the bridge deck is a curving profile formed by a curved main girder, with the central deck width roughly between 15 and 20 metres at its widest point. The bridge layout and decorative elements incorporate motifs from Lingnan regional culture — the planform takes inspiration from the flowing sleeve shapes of Cantonese opera, the arch echoes the form of a traditional guqin (Chinese zither), and the deck landscaping is themed as Lingnan flower-boats.

The bridge provides two pedestrian walkways (east and west). The east-side walkway is approximately 500 metres long while the west-side walkway is approximately 270 metres long.

== Usage and visitor numbers ==
During its first year of operation (June 2021 – June 2022), Haixin Bridge recorded an estimated 3.4 million visitors.

== Awards and recognition ==
Haixin Bridge has been shortlisted for and received several international awards. It was shortlisted for an IABSE (International Association for Bridge and Structural Engineering) award in 2022 and won a "World Pedestrian Bridge" award (gold) in 2023.

== Controversy and access management ==
Although designed as a pedestrian bridge, Haixin Bridge has operated under managed access policies since opening. The bridge has at times required advance reservation and has been subject to time-of-day and capacity controls (appointment, staggered access, time-limited visits and flow-control measures). These measures were put in place because the Canton Tower area is managed as a major tourist core, with security and crowd-management requirements; additionally, cycling — though a bicycle lane is marked on the bridge — has often not been permitted, drawing criticism that the bridge does not fully serve everyday commuter needs. In response, authorities have explained that restrictions are necessary to meet management requirements for the Canton Tower core area.

In November 2023 the bridge began weekday access without advance reservation (security checks and crowd control measures were retained); in January 2025 reservation requirements were reported to have been fully cancelled.

== See also ==
- Canton Tower
- Ersha Island
- List of bridges in China
