= Licun Park station =

Qingdao Metro station

Licun Park 李村公园
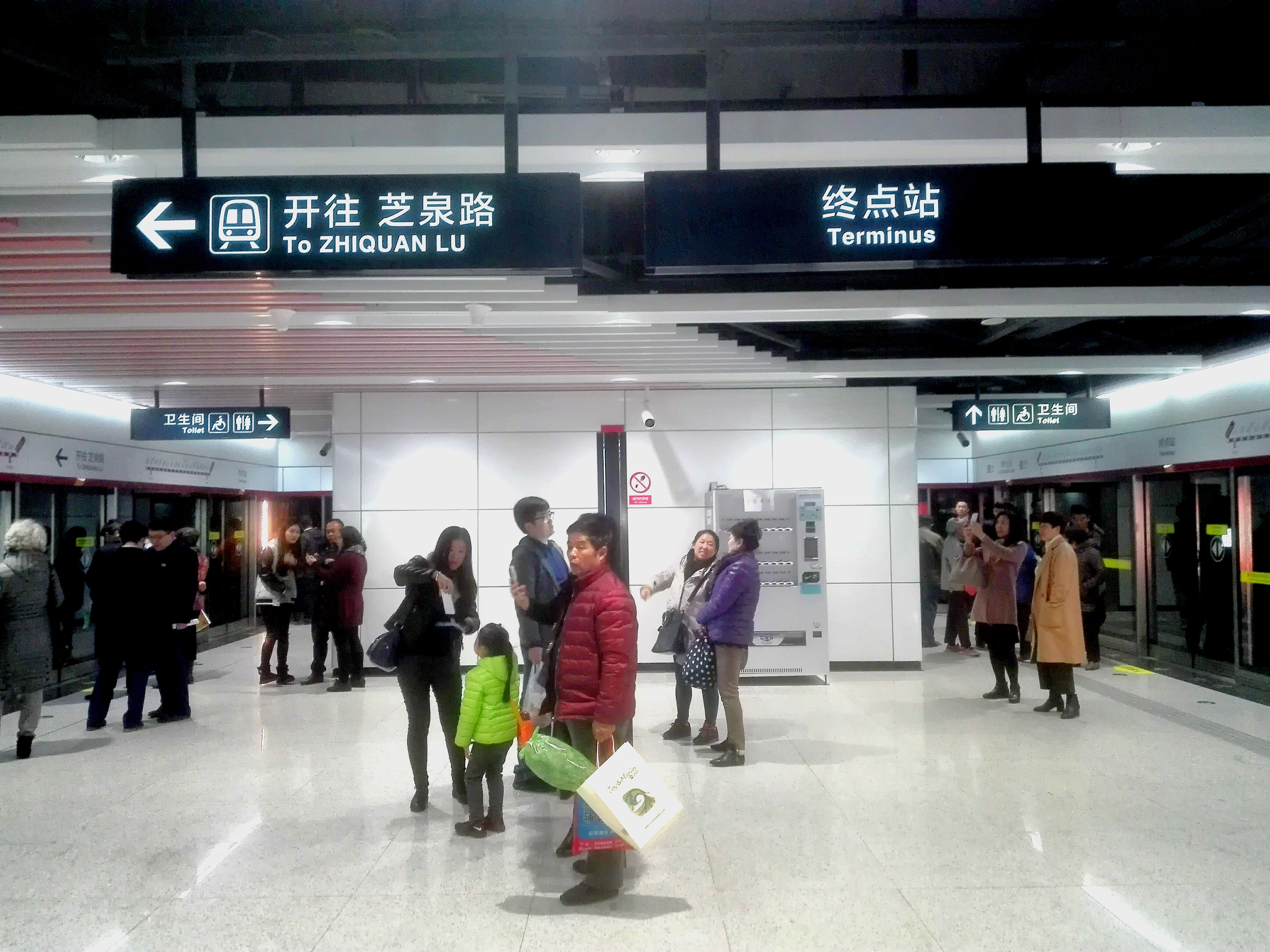

General information
- Location: Licang District, Qingdao, Shandong; China
- Operated by: Qingdao Metro Corporation
- Line: Line 2
- Platforms: 2 (1 island platform)

History
- Opened: 10 December 2017; 8 years ago

Services
| Preceding station | Qingdao Metro | Following station |
|---|---|---|
| Licun towards Taishan Road | Line 2 | Terminus |
Location

Licun Park (Chinese: 李村公园) is a station on Line 2 of the Qingdao Metro. It opened on 10 December 2017. It is located in Licang District and it is the current northbound terminus of Line 2.

== History ==
On November 2, 2012, the first phase of Qingdao Metro Line 2 was officially inaugurated, and civil construction of the metro stations began. On December 10, 2017, the station opened with the start of trial operations of Line 2.
