= Liaoyang East Road station =

Qingdao Metro station

Liaoyang East Road 辽阳东路
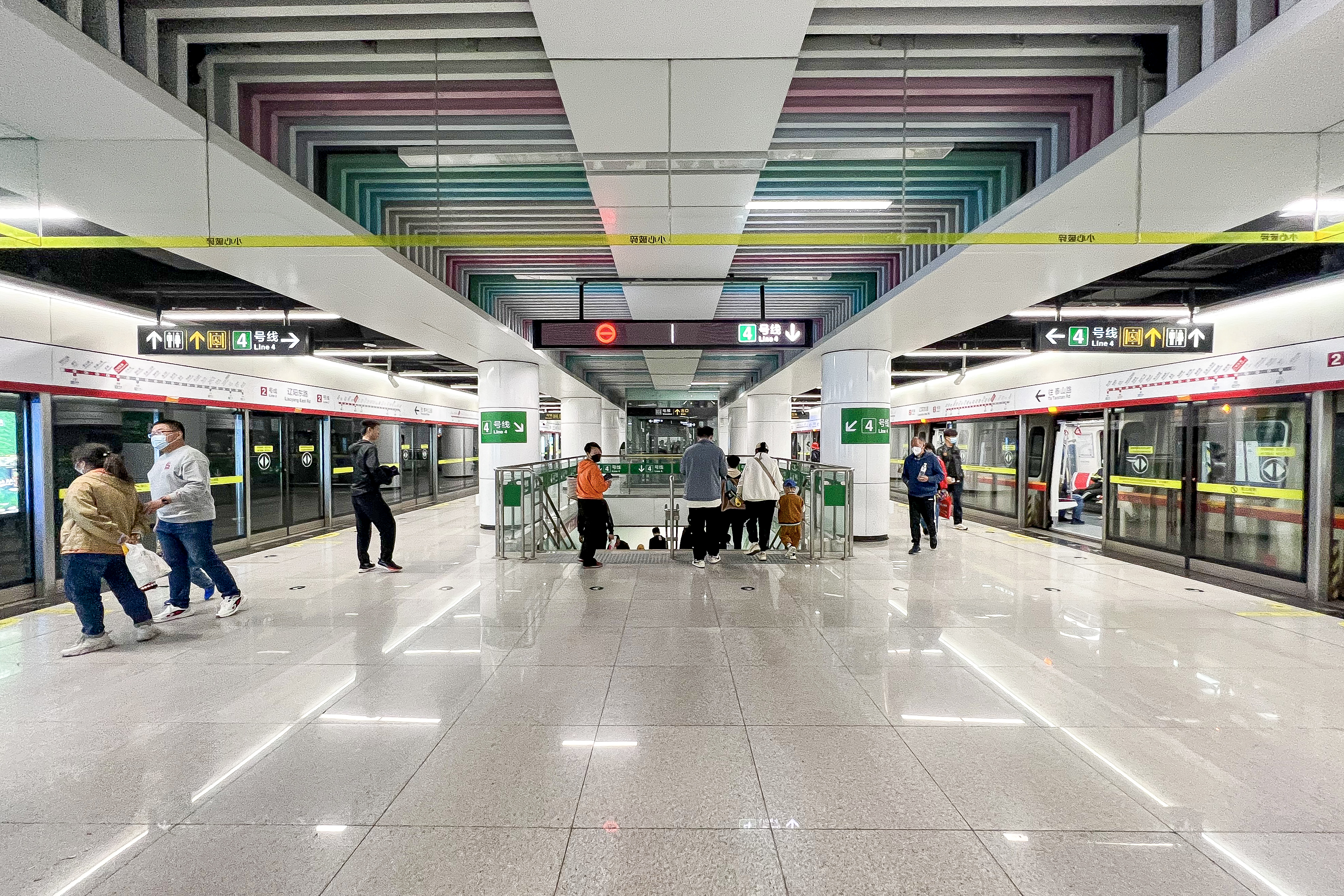
- Line 2 platform

General information
- Location: Laoshan District, Qingdao, Shandong; China
- Operated by: Qingdao Metro Corporation
- Lines: Line 2 Line 4
- Platforms: 4 (2 island platforms)

History
- Opened: 10 December 2017; 8 years ago

Services
Preceding station	Qingdao Metro	Following station
Tong'an Road towards Taishan Road	Line 2	Donghan towards Licun Park
Dabudong towards Hall of the People	Line 4	Dongjiaxiazhuang towards Dahedong
Location

Liaoyang East Road (Chinese: 辽阳东路) is a station on Line 2 and Line 4 of the Qingdao Metro. It opened on 10 December 2017.

== Gallery ==
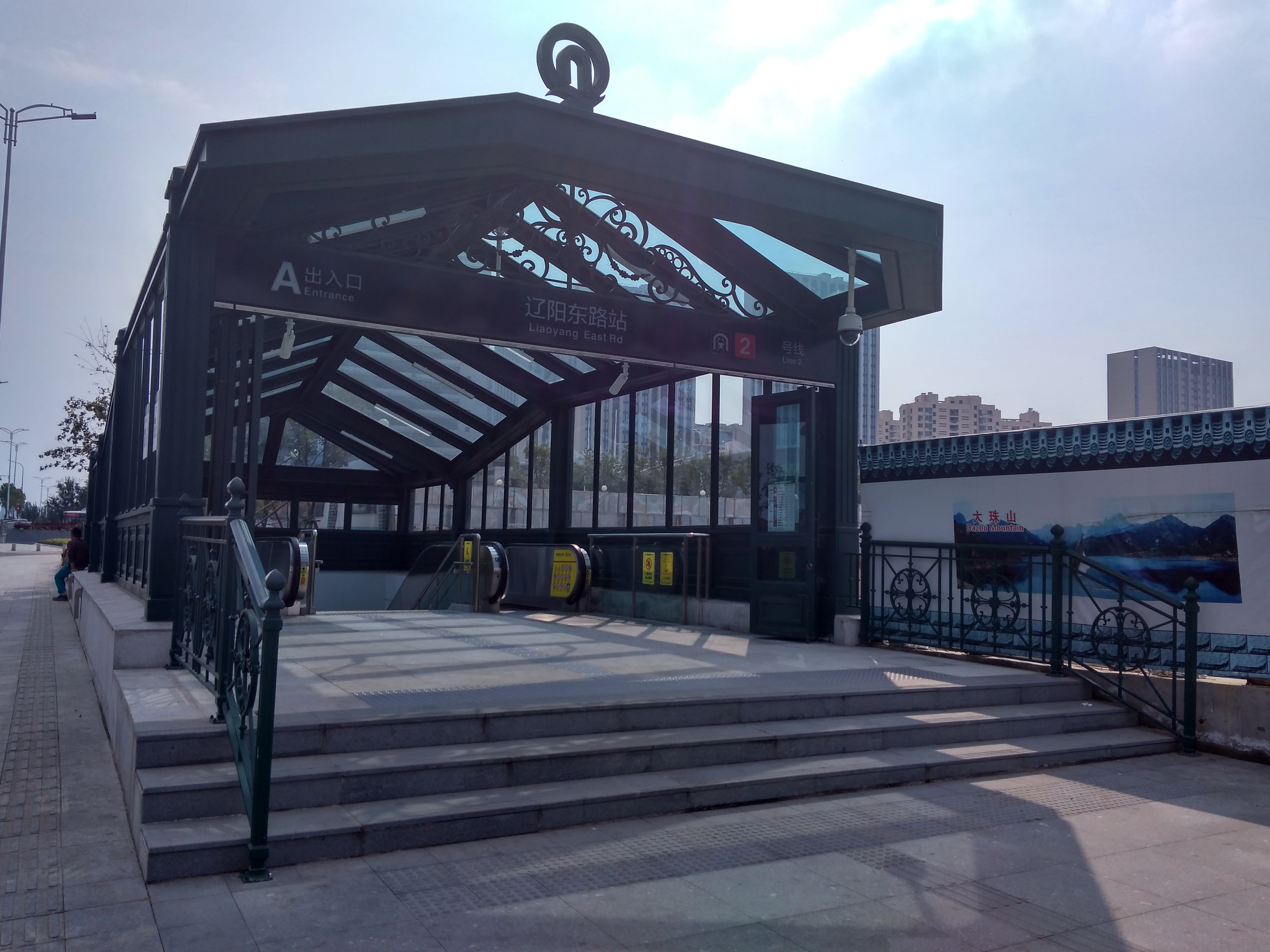
Entrance A

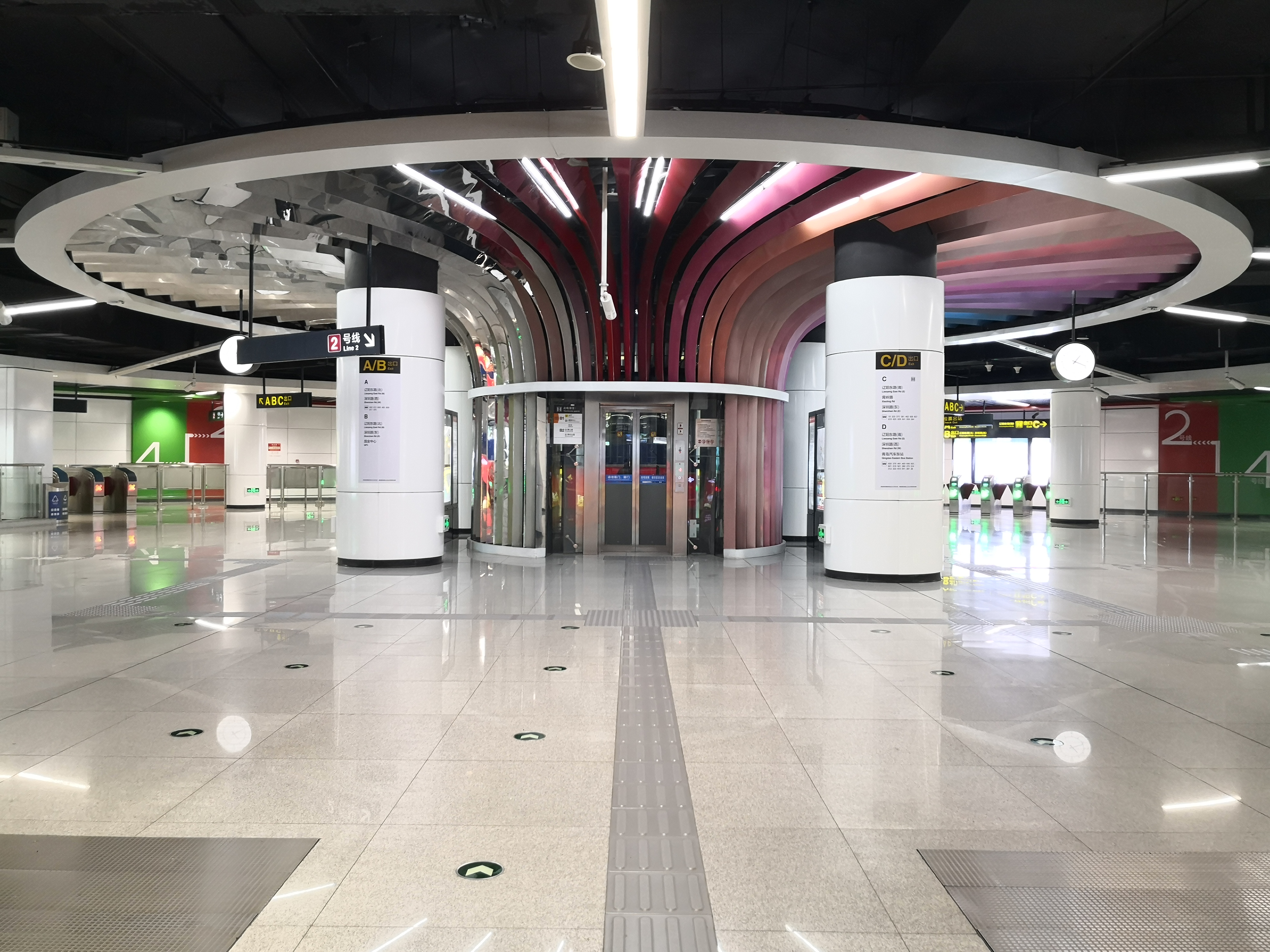
Concourse

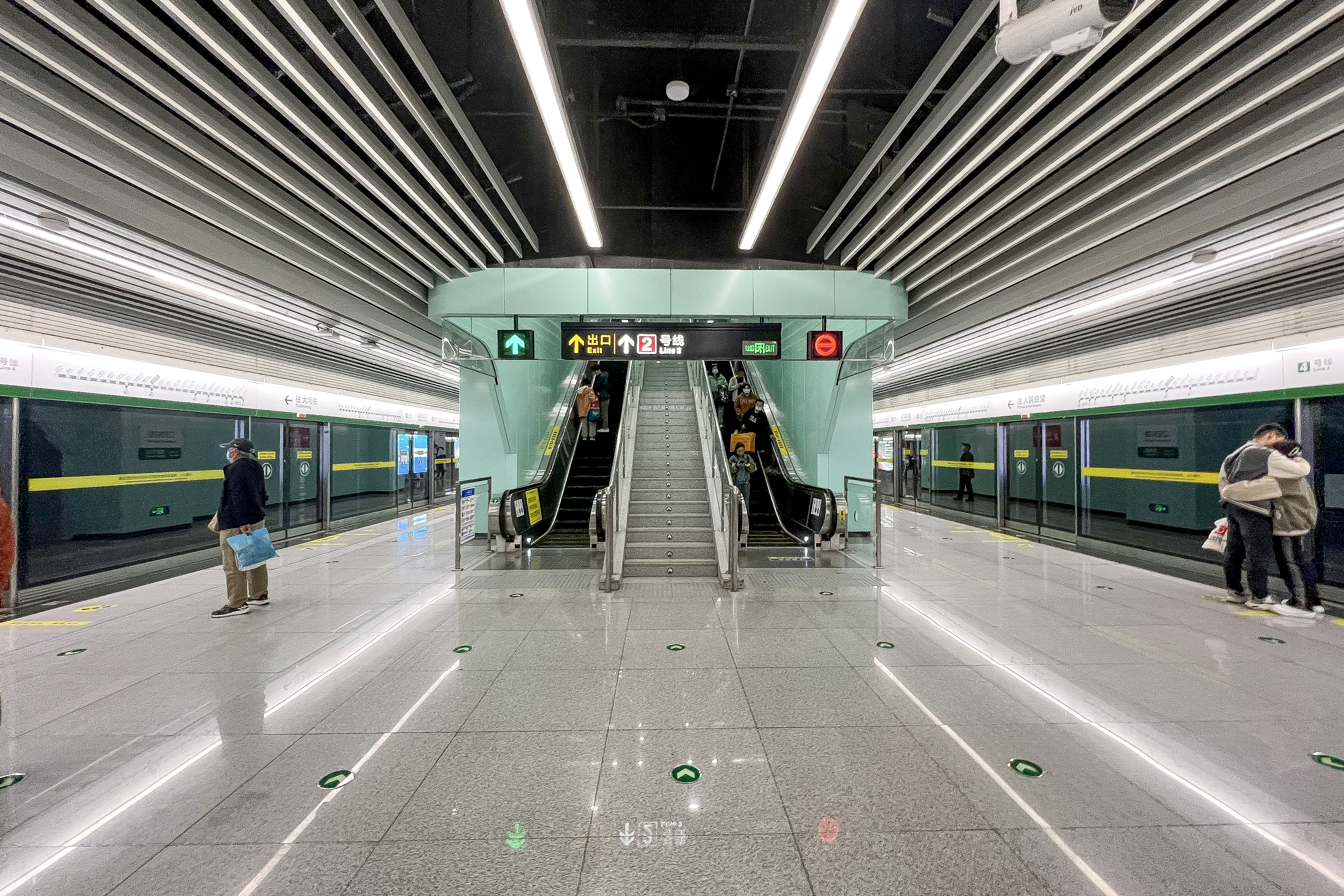
Line 4 platform
