= Donghan station =

Qingdao Metro station

Donghan 东韩
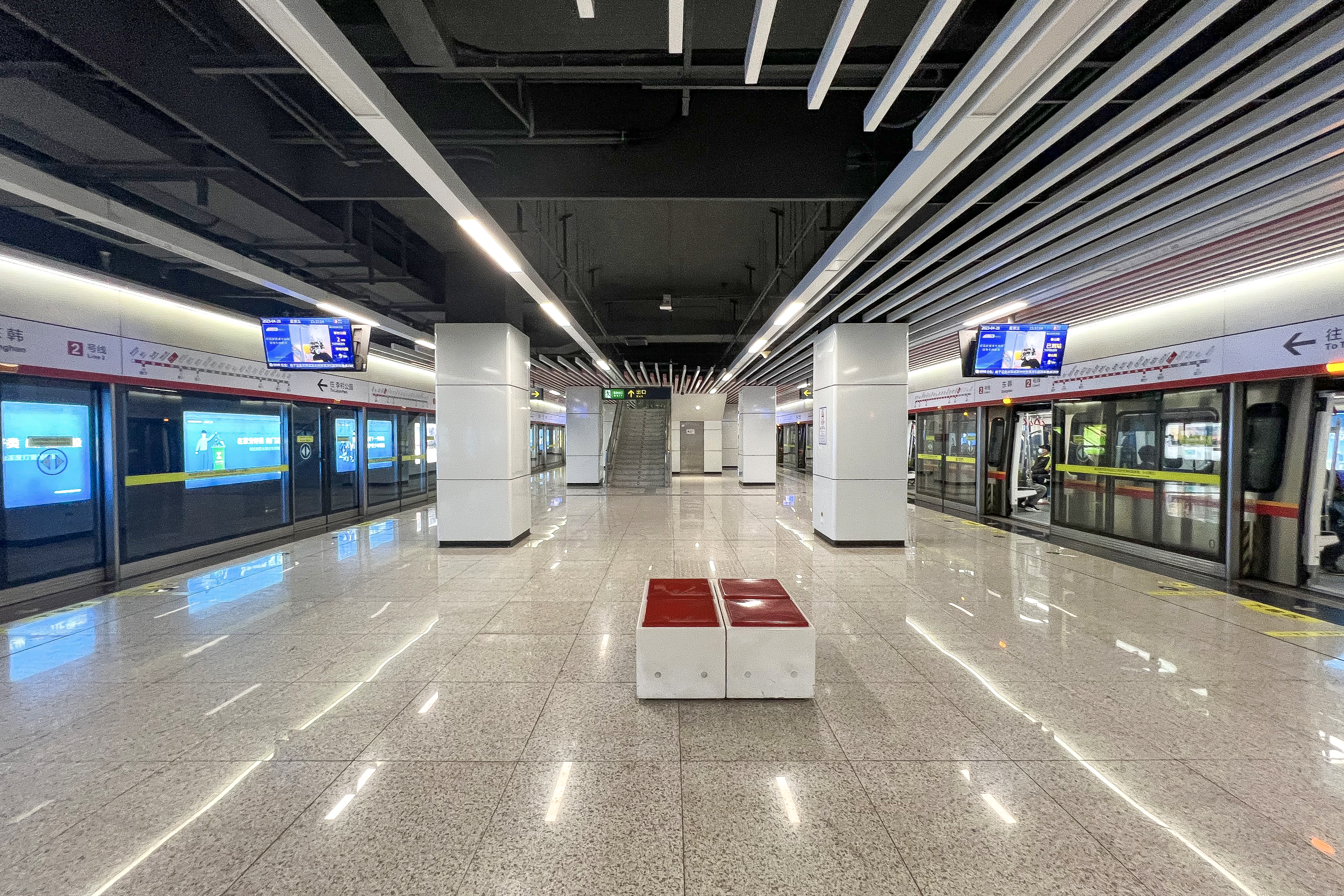

General information
- Location: Laoshan District, Qingdao, Shandong; China
- Operated by: Qingdao Metro Corporation
- Line: Line 2
- Platforms: 2 (1 island platform)

History
- Opened: 10 December 2017; 8 years ago

Services
Preceding station	Qingdao Metro	Following station
Liaoyang East Road towards Taishan Road	Line 2	Hualoushan Road towards Licun Park
Location

Donghan (Chinese: 东韩) is a station on Line 2 of the Qingdao Metro. It opened on 10 December 2017.
