= Tong'an Road station =

Qingdao Metro station

Tong'an Road 同安路
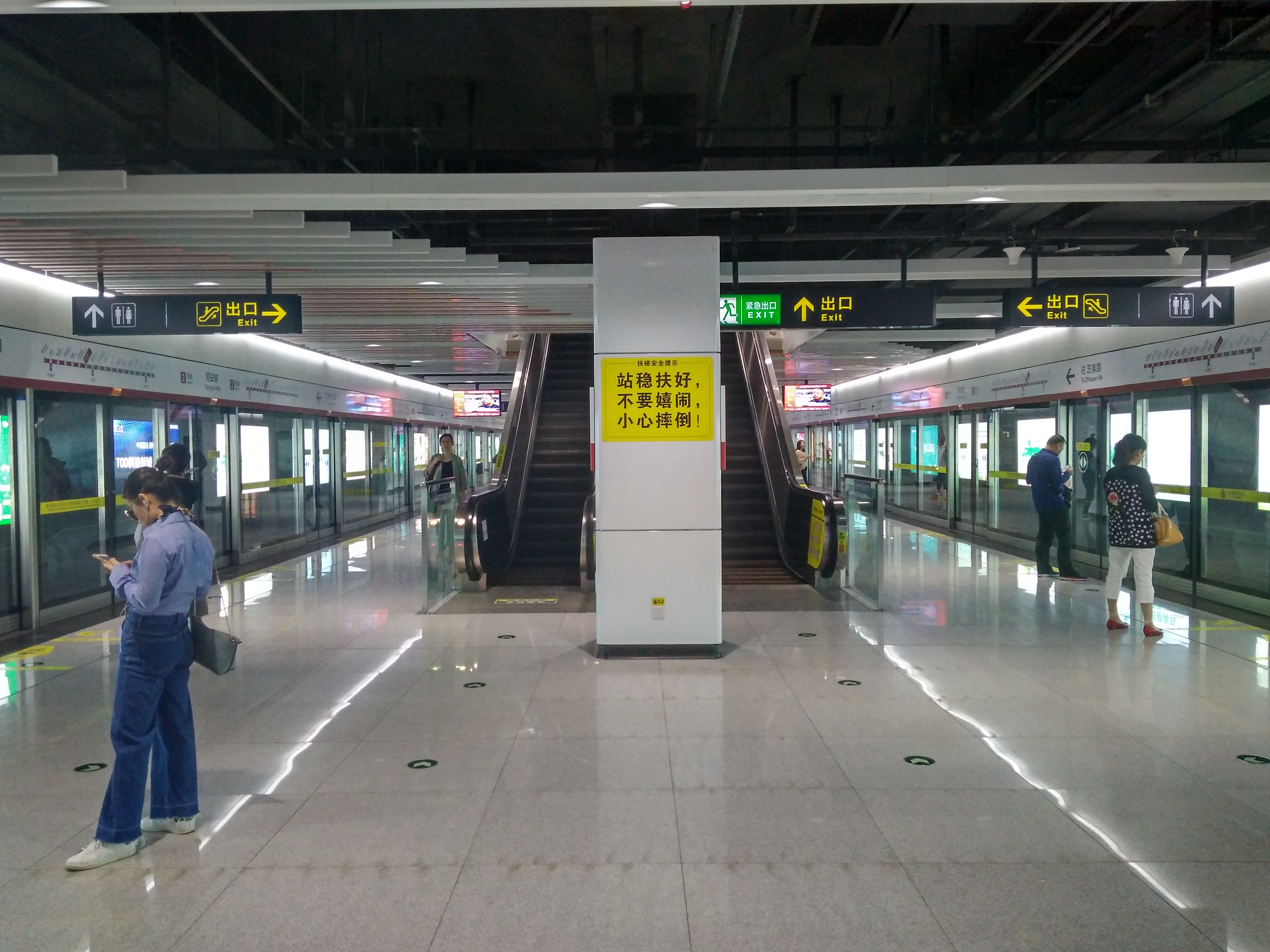

General information
- Location: Laoshan District, Qingdao, Shandong; China
- Operated by: Qingdao Metro Corporation
- Line: Line 2
- Platforms: 2 (1 island platform)

History
- Opened: 10 December 2017; 8 years ago

Services
Preceding station	Qingdao Metro	Following station
Miaoling Road towards Taishan Road	Line 2	Liaoyang East Road towards Licun Park
Location

Tong'an Road (Chinese: 同安路) is a station on Line 2 of the Qingdao Metro. It opened on 10 December 2017.

== Gallery ==
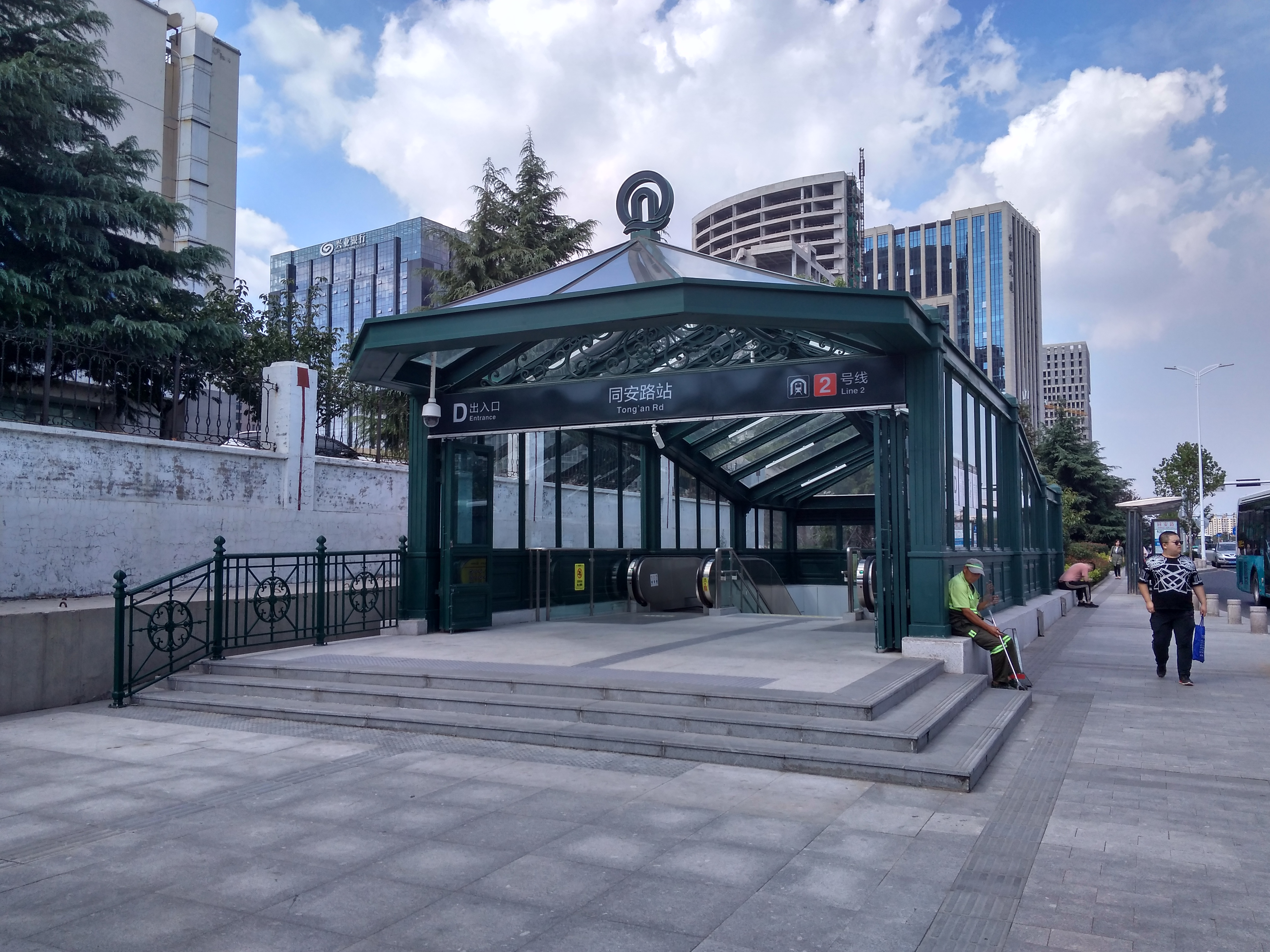
Entrance D

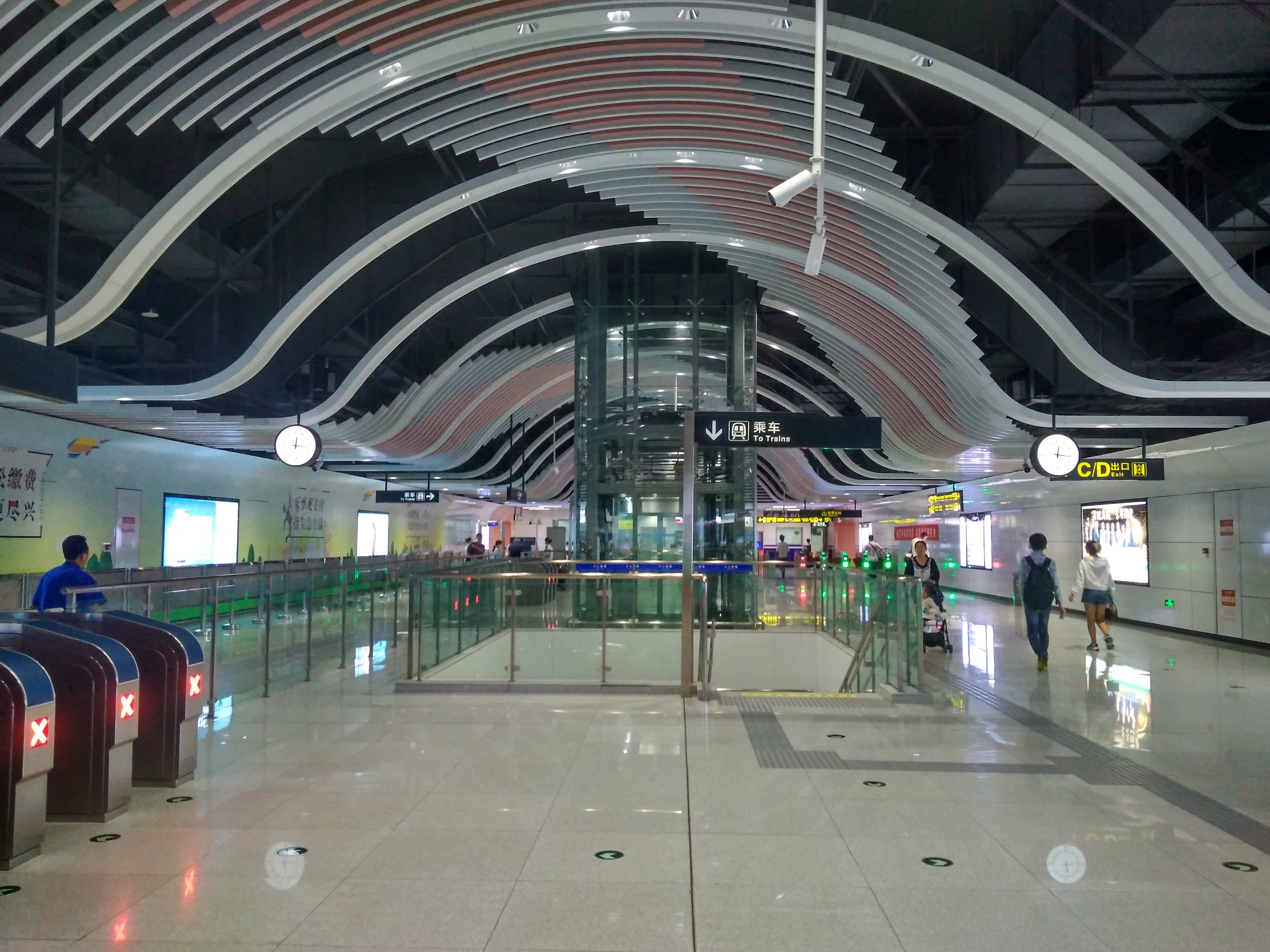
Concourse
