= Qingdao Tiantai Stadium =

Sports venue in Qingdao, China

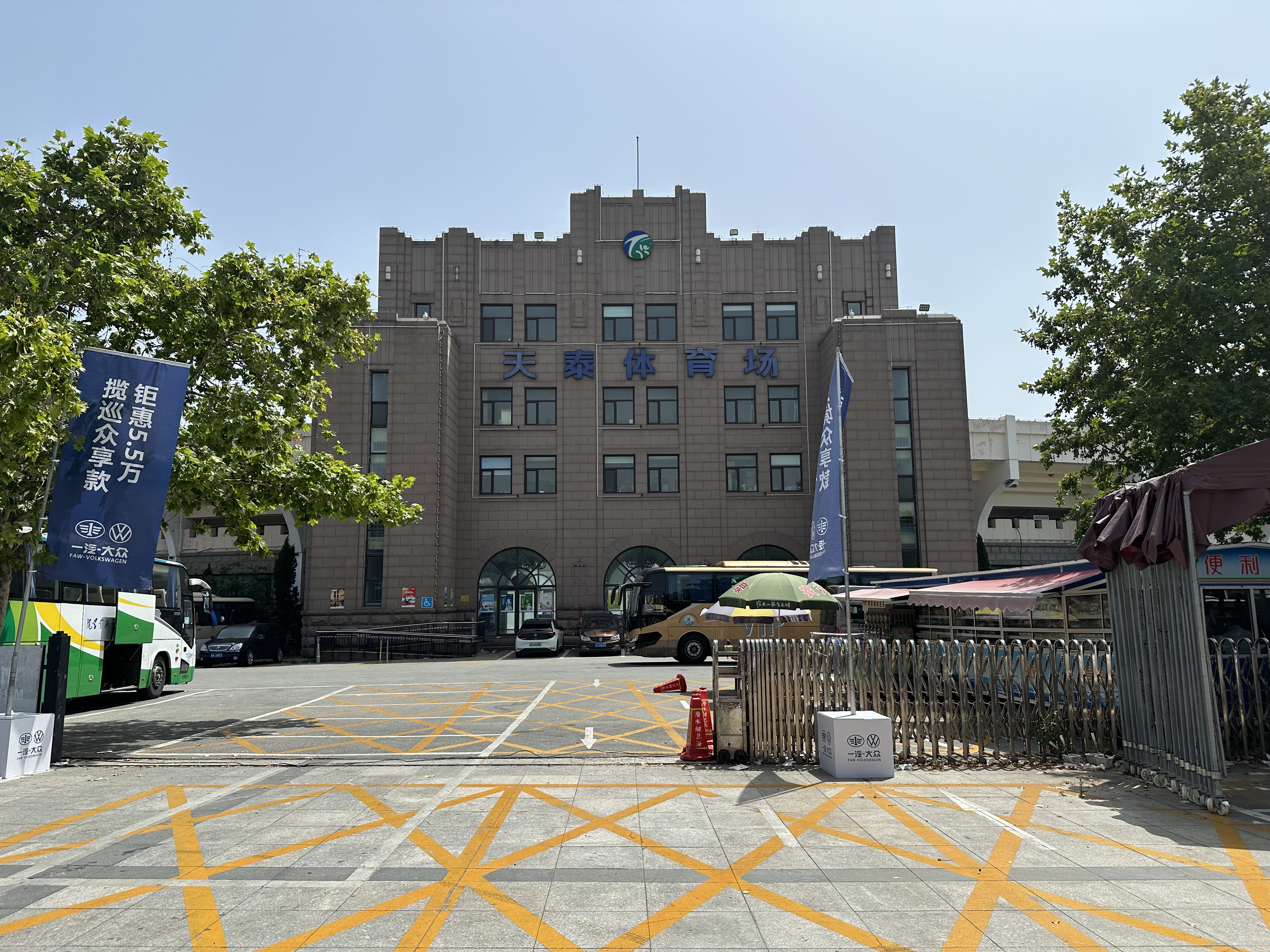
- Interactive map of Qingdao Tiantai Stadium
- Full name: 青岛市天泰体育场
- Location: Qingdao, Shandong, China
- Coordinates: 36°3′31.85″N 120°20′39.80″E
- Capacity: 20,525
- Public transit: 3 at Zhongshan Park

Construction
- Groundbreaking: 1932
- Opened: July 1933
- Renovated: 2003

Tenant
- Qingdao Red Lions

The Qingdao Tiantai Stadium (Chinese: 青岛市天泰体育场), former name Qingdao First Stadium (Chinese: 青岛市第一体育场), is a multi-use stadium in Qingdao, Shandong, China. It is used mostly for football matches, but also for athletics and rugby sevens.

Tiantai Stadium was built in 1932 as Qingdao Municipal Stadium (Chinese: 青岛市体育场), modelling on Los Angeles Memorial Coliseum, which hosted the 1932 Summer Olympics. It renamed as Qingdao First Stadium in 1950s and as Tiantai Stadium in November 2003.

== See also ==
- Sports in China
- List of football stadiums in China
- List of stadiums in China
- Lists of stadiums
