= Zaoshan Road station =

Qingdao Metro station

Zaoshan Road 枣山路
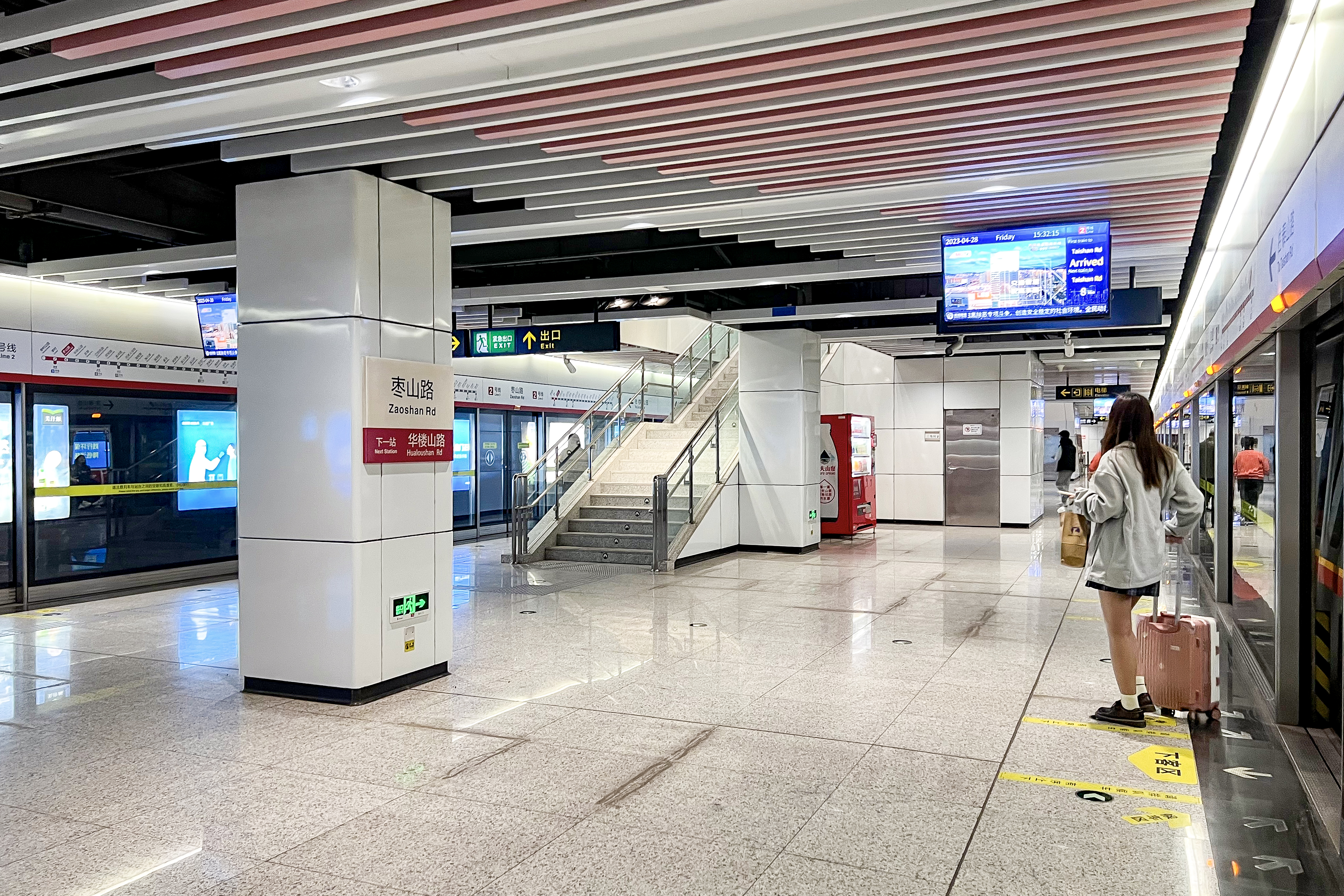

General information
- Location: Licang District, Qingdao, Shandong; China
- Coordinates: 36.153518°N 120.428347°E
- Operated by: Qingdao Metro Corporation
- Line(s): Line 2
- Platforms: 2 (1 island platform)

History
- Opened: 10 December 2017; 7 years ago

Services
Preceding station	Qingdao Metro	Following station
Hualoushan Road towards Taishan Road	Line 2	Licun towards Licun Park

Zaoshan Road (Chinese: 枣山路) is a station on Line 2 of the Qingdao Metro. It opened on 10 December 2017.

== Gallery ==
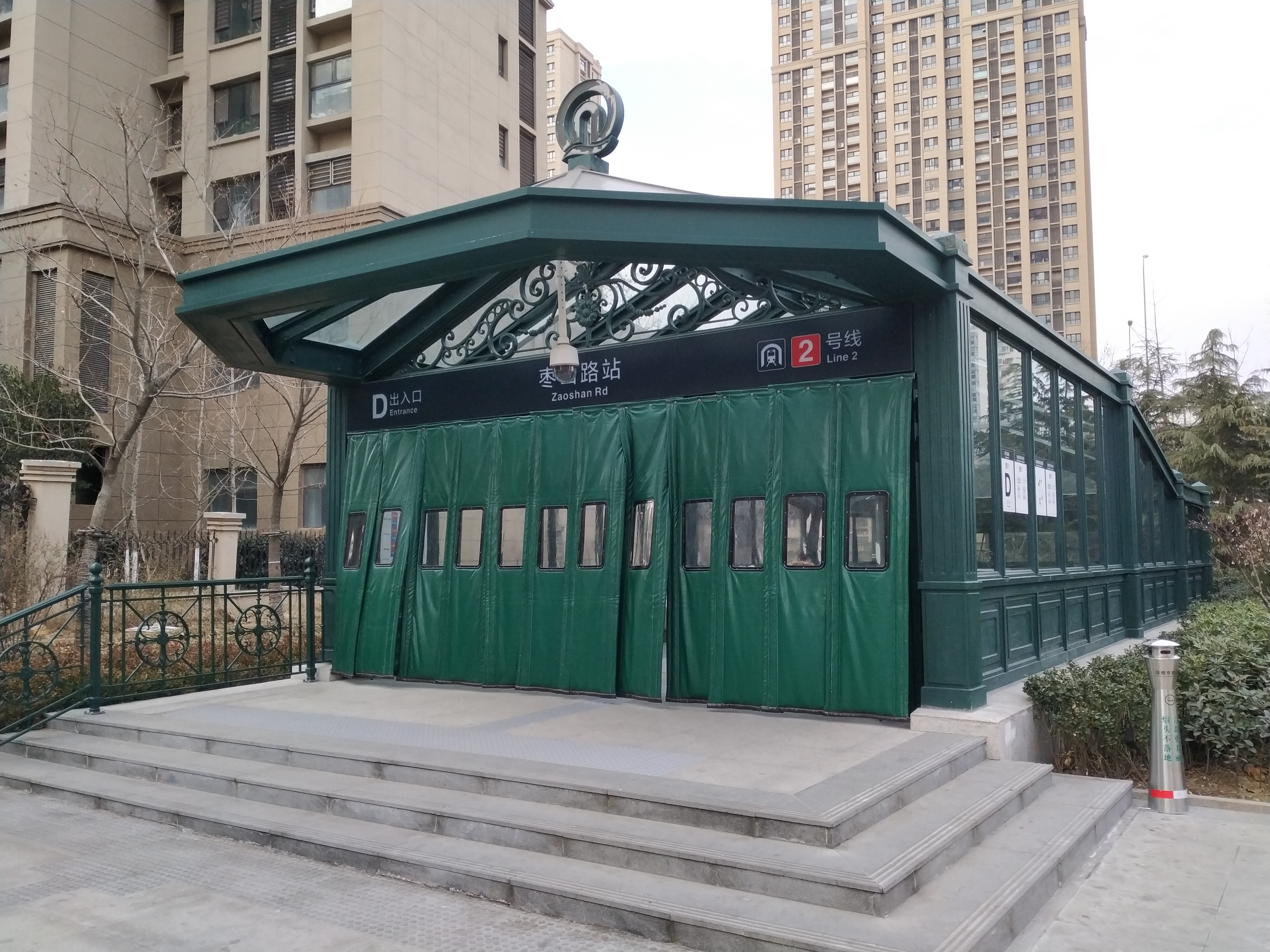
Entrance D

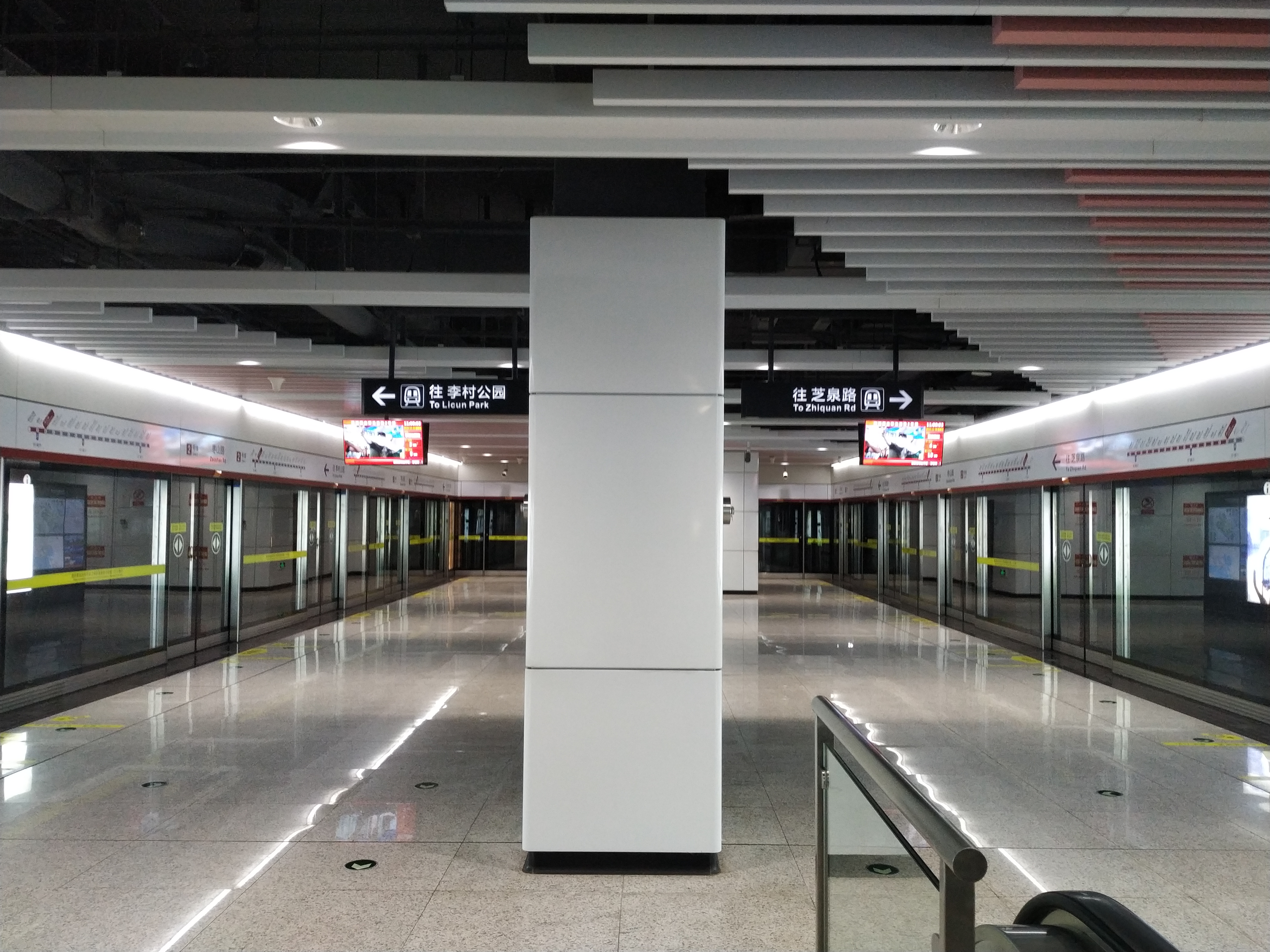
Platform
