= Hualoushan Road station =

Qingdao Metro station

Hualoushan Road 华楼山路
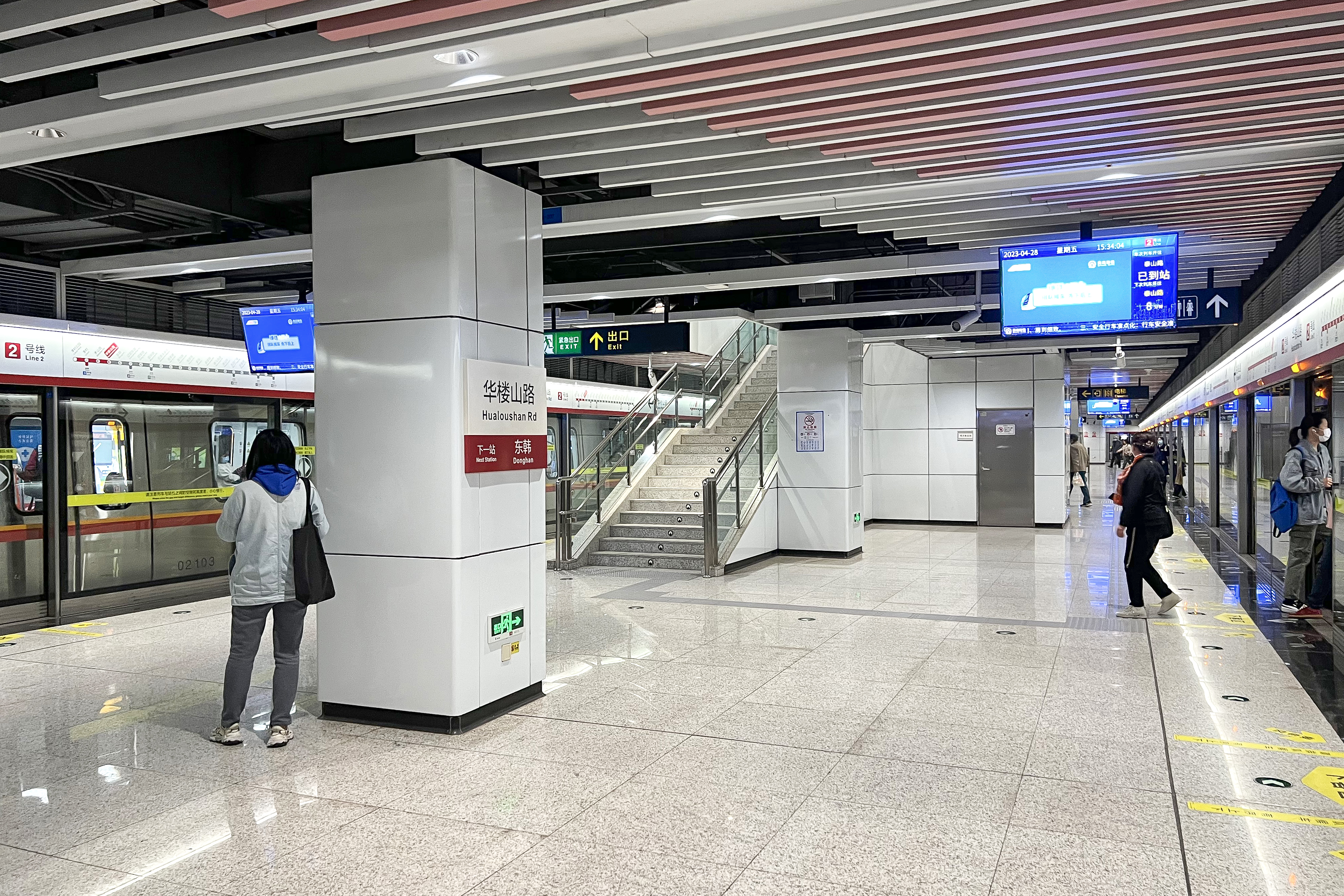

General information
- Location: Licang District, Qingdao, Shandong; China
- Operated by: Qingdao Metro Corporation
- Line: Line 2
- Platforms: 2 (1 island platform)

History
- Opened: 10 December 2017; 8 years ago

Services
Preceding station	Qingdao Metro	Following station
Donghan towards Taishan Road	Line 2	Zaoshan Road towards Licun Park
Location

Hualoushan Road (Chinese: 华楼山路) is a station on Line 2 of the Qingdao Metro. It opened on 10 December 2017.
