= Line 4 (Qingdao Metro) =

Metro line in Qingdao, China

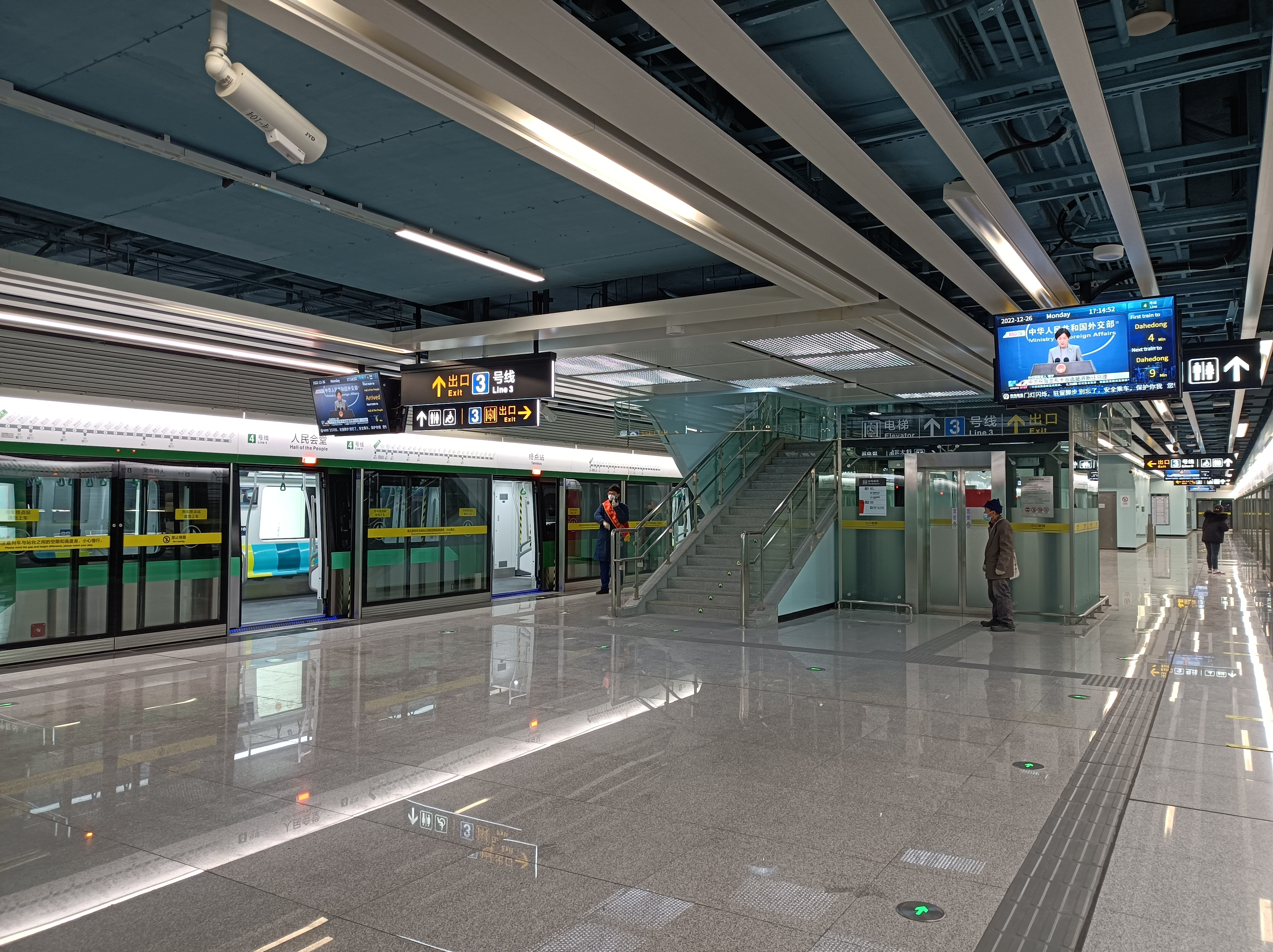
- Hall of the People station

Overview
- Native name: 青岛地铁4号线
- Status: In operation
- Owner: Government of Qingdao
- Locale: Qingdao, Shandong Province, China
- Termini: Hall of the People; Dahedong
- Stations: 25 (24 in operation)

Service
- Type: Rapid transit
- System: Qingdao Metro
- Operator: Qingdao Metro Corporation

History
- Opened: 26 December 2022; 3 years ago

Technical
- Line length: 30.7 km (19.1 mi)
- Number of tracks: 2
- Track gauge: 1,435 mm (4 ft 8 1/2 in)

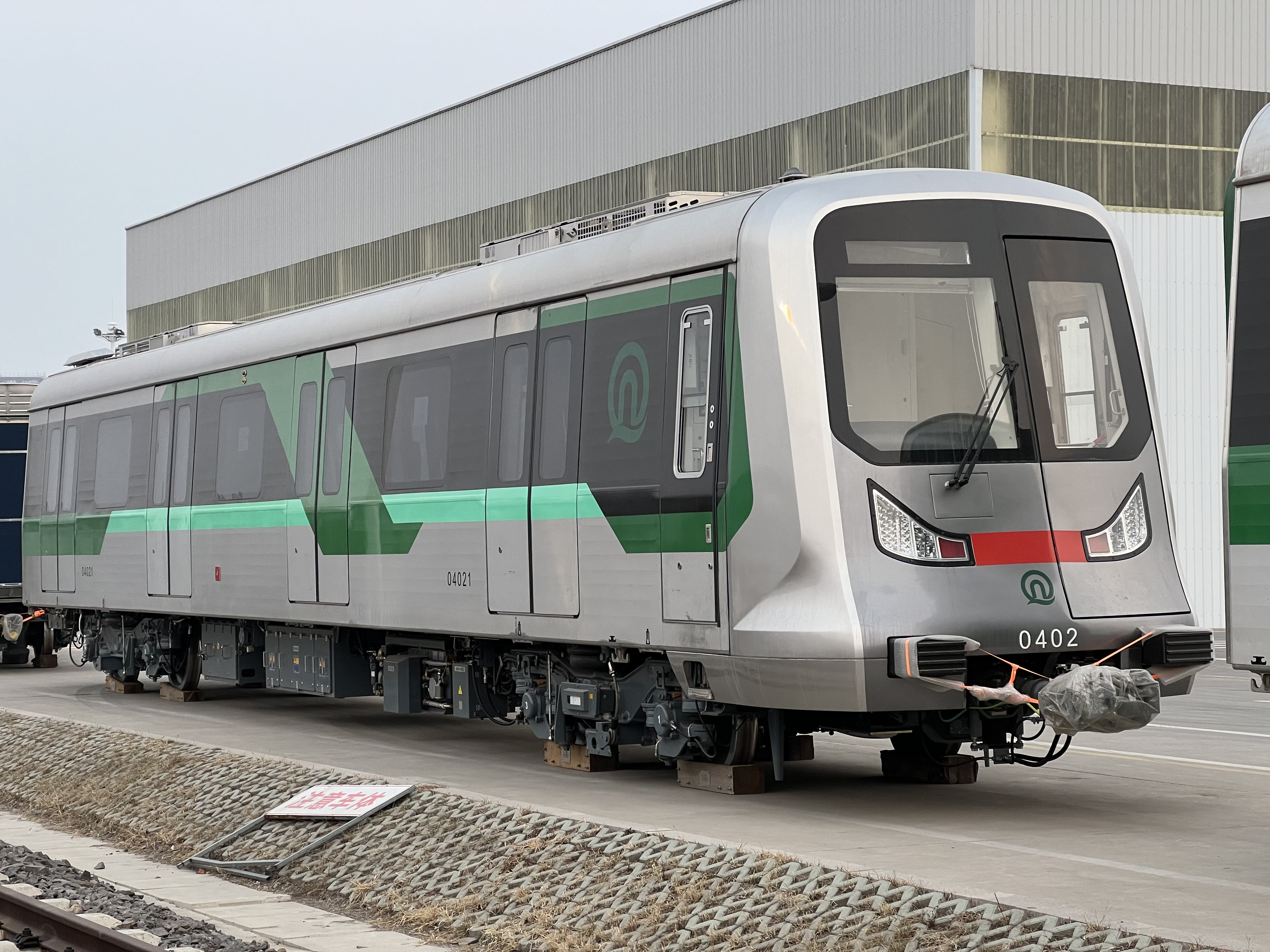
Line 4 train

Line 4 of Qingdao Metro is a rapid transit line in Qingdao, Shandong, China. The line opened on 26 December 2022.

== Opening timeline ==
| Segment | Commencement | Length | Station(s) | Name |
|---|---|---|---|---|
| Hall of the People — Dahedong | 26 December 2022 | 30.7 km (19.1 mi) | 25 | Phase 1 |
| Guanxiangshan (Qingdao Municipal Hospital) | 31 August 2023 | - | 1 | infill station |

== Stations ==
| Station name | | Connections | Distance km | Location |
| English | Chinese | Connections | Distance km | Location |
|---|---|---|---|---|
| Hall of the People | 人民会堂 | 3 | | Shinan |
| Xinhaoshan (The Affiliate Hospital of Qingdao University) | 信号山（青大附院） | | | Shinan |
| Guanxiangshan (Qingdao Municipal Hospital) | 观象山（市立医院） | 1 | | Shibei / Shinan |
| Taishan Road | 泰山路 | 2 | | Shibei |
| Changle Road | 昌乐路 | | | Shibei |
| Haipohe Park | 海泊河公园 | | | Shibei |
| Haipo Bridge (Hiser Hospital) | 海泊桥（海慈医疗） | 1 | | Shibei |
| Xiwujiacun | 西吴家村 | 8 | | Shibei |
| Cuobuling | 错埠岭 | 3 | | Shibei |
| Fuliao Flyover | 福辽立交桥 | | | Shibei |
| Hongshanpo (Qingdao Women and Children's Hospital) | 洪山坡（妇儿医院） | | | Shibei |
| Jingsong 3rd Road | 劲松三路 | | | Shibei |
| Buxi | 埠西 | | | Shibei |
| Dabudong | 大埠东 | | | Laoshan |
| Liaoyang East Road | 辽阳东路 | 2 | | Laoshan |
| Dongjiaxiazhuang | 菫家下庄 | | | Laoshan |
| Keyuanjing 7th Road | 科苑经七路 | | | Laoshan |
| Zhangcun | 张村 | Oceantec Valley | | Laoshan |
| Pengjiazhuang | 彭家庄 | | | Laoshan |
| Nanzhaike | 南宅科 | | | Laoshan |
| Xiaolaoshan | 小崂山 | | | Laoshan |
| Shazikou | 沙子口 | | | Laoshan |
| Duanjiabu | 段家埠 | | | Laoshan |
| Dengying | 登瀛 | | | Laoshan |
| Dahedong | 大河东 | | | Laoshan |
