= Huiquan Square station =

Qingdao Metro station

Coordinates: 36.0594°N 120.3386°E

Huiquan Square 汇泉广场
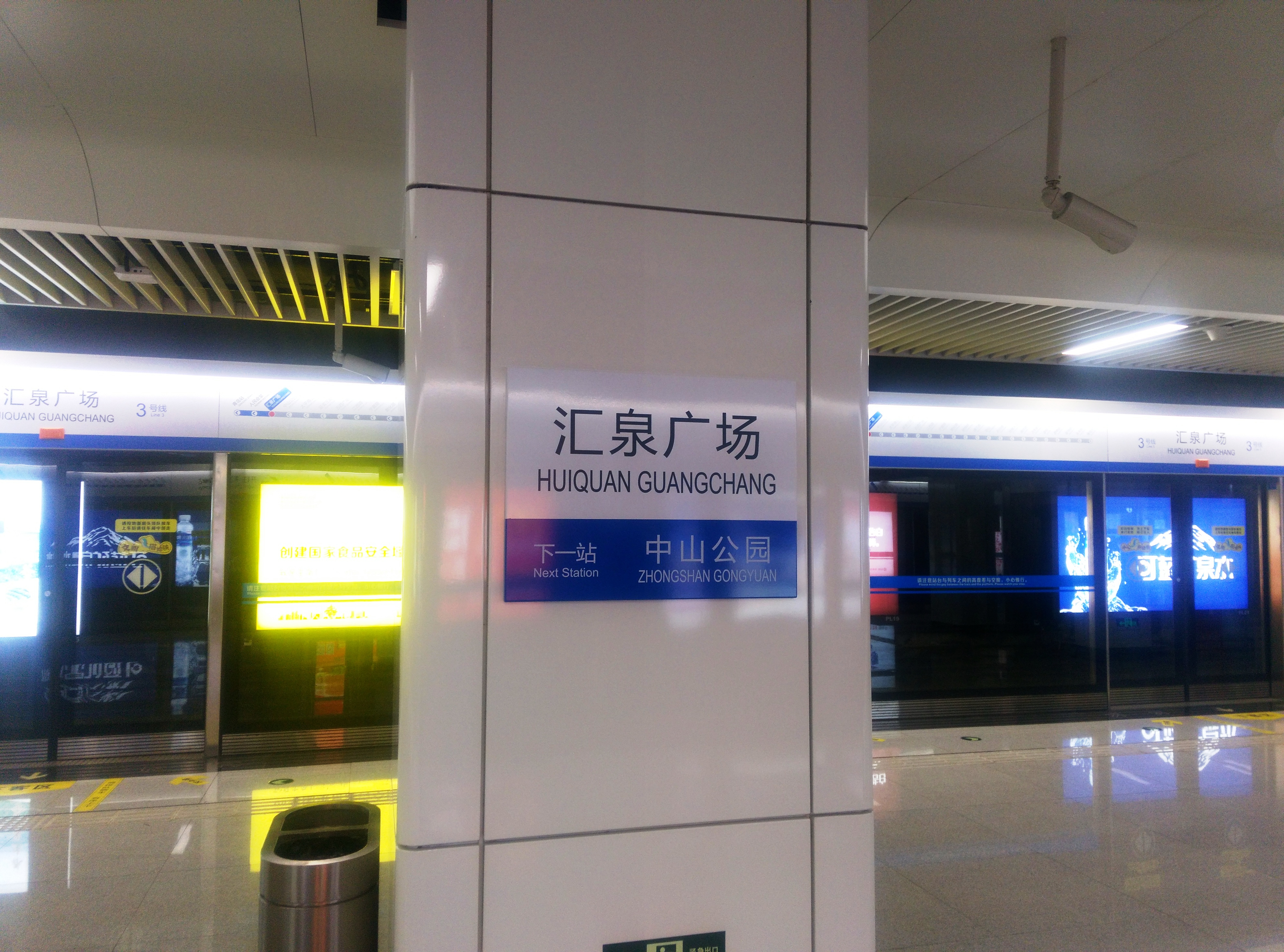
- Station signage, with the old name on it before renaming

General information
- Location: Shinan District, Qingdao, Shandong; China
- Operated by: Qingdao Metro Corporation
- Line: Line 3
- Platforms: 2 (1 island platform)

History
- Opened: 18 December 2016; 9 years ago

Services
Preceding station	Qingdao Metro	Following station
Hall of the People towards Qingdao Railway Station	Line 3	Zhongshan Park towards Qingdao North Railway Station
Location

Huiquan Square, formerly known as Huiquan Guangchang (Chinese: 汇泉广场) is a station on Line 3 of the Qingdao Metro. It opened on 18 December 2016.

== Gallery ==
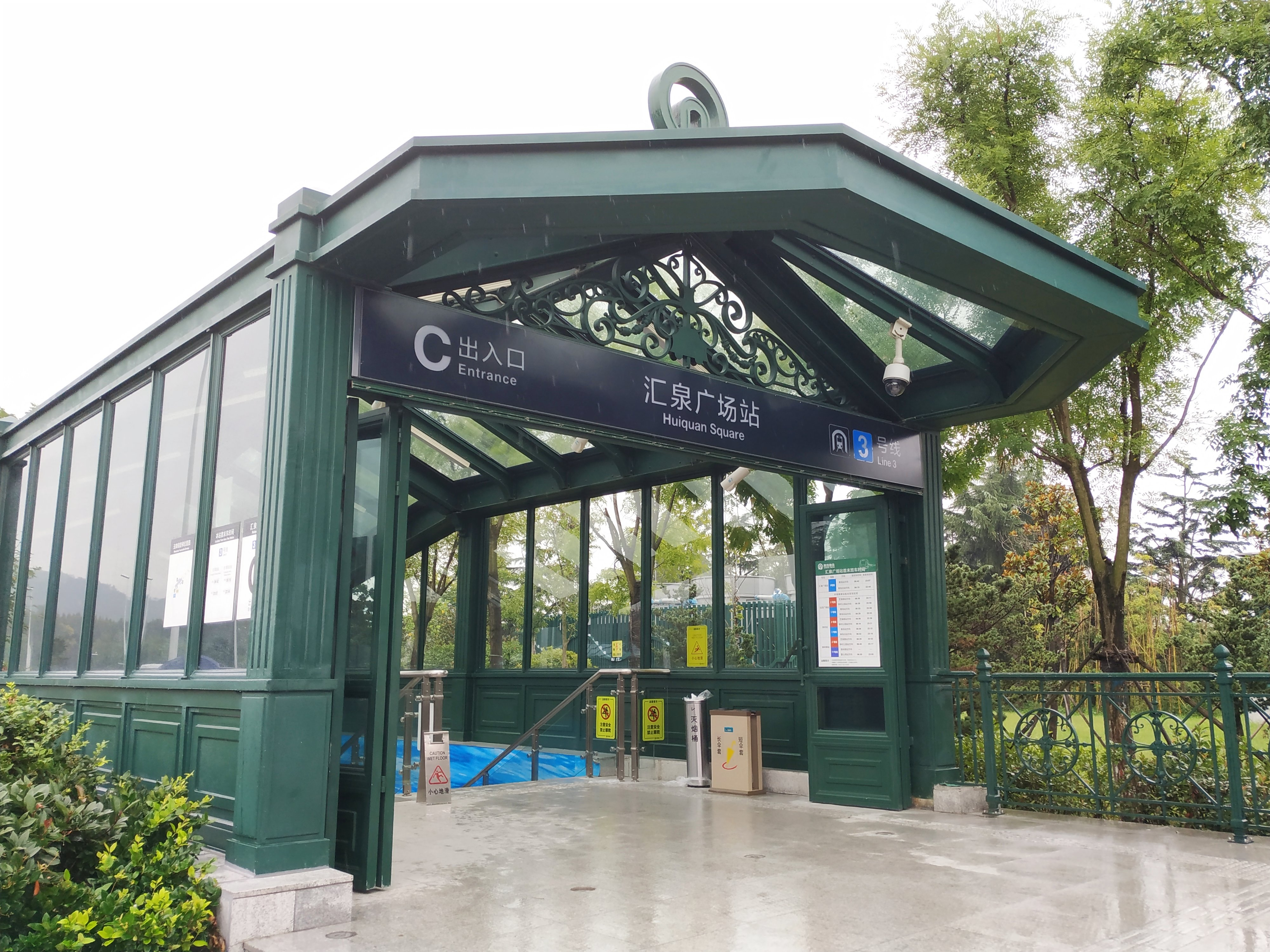
Entrance C

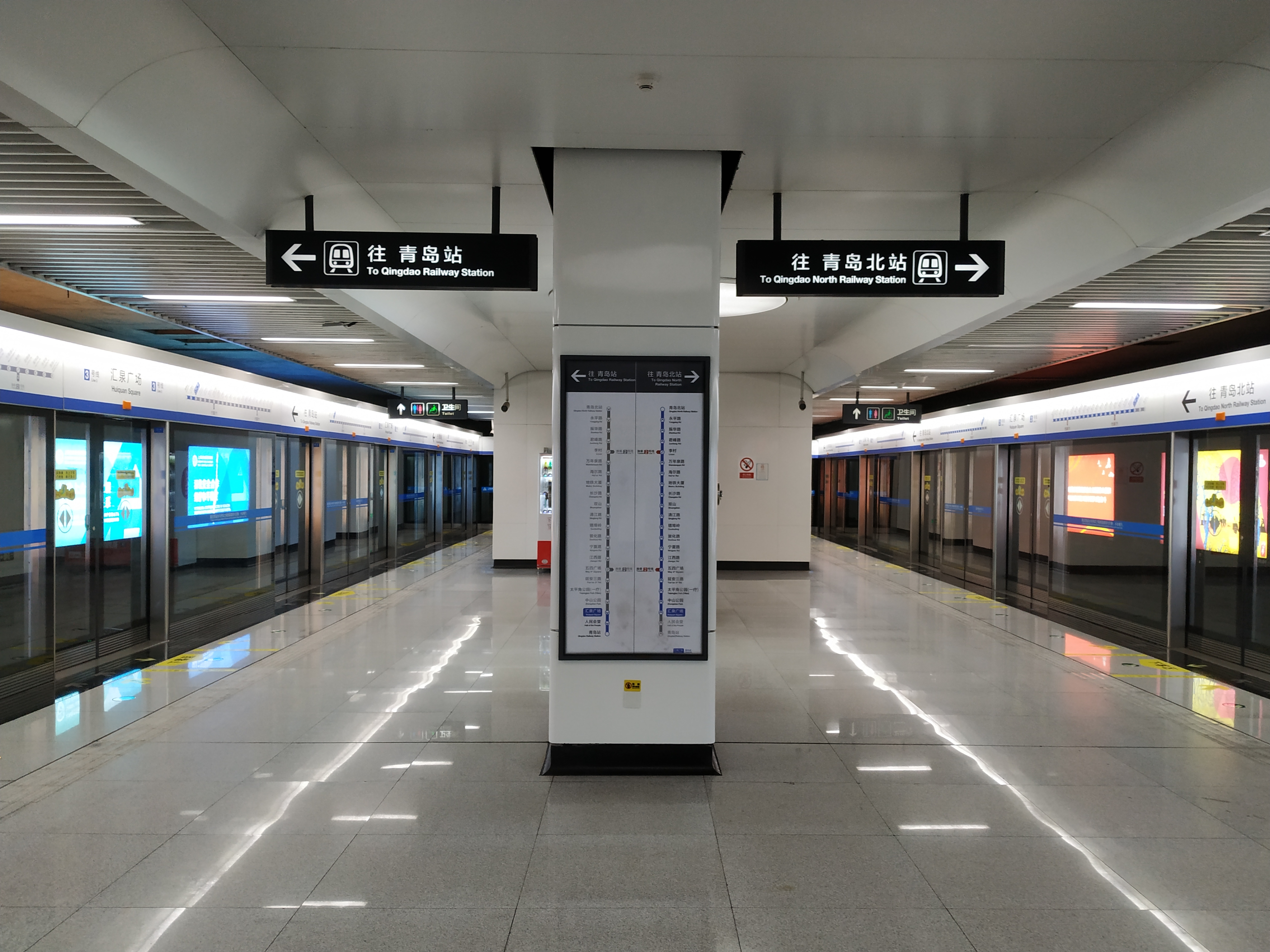
Platform
