= Zhongshan Park station (Qingdao Metro) =

Qingdao Metro station

Zhongshan Park 中山公园
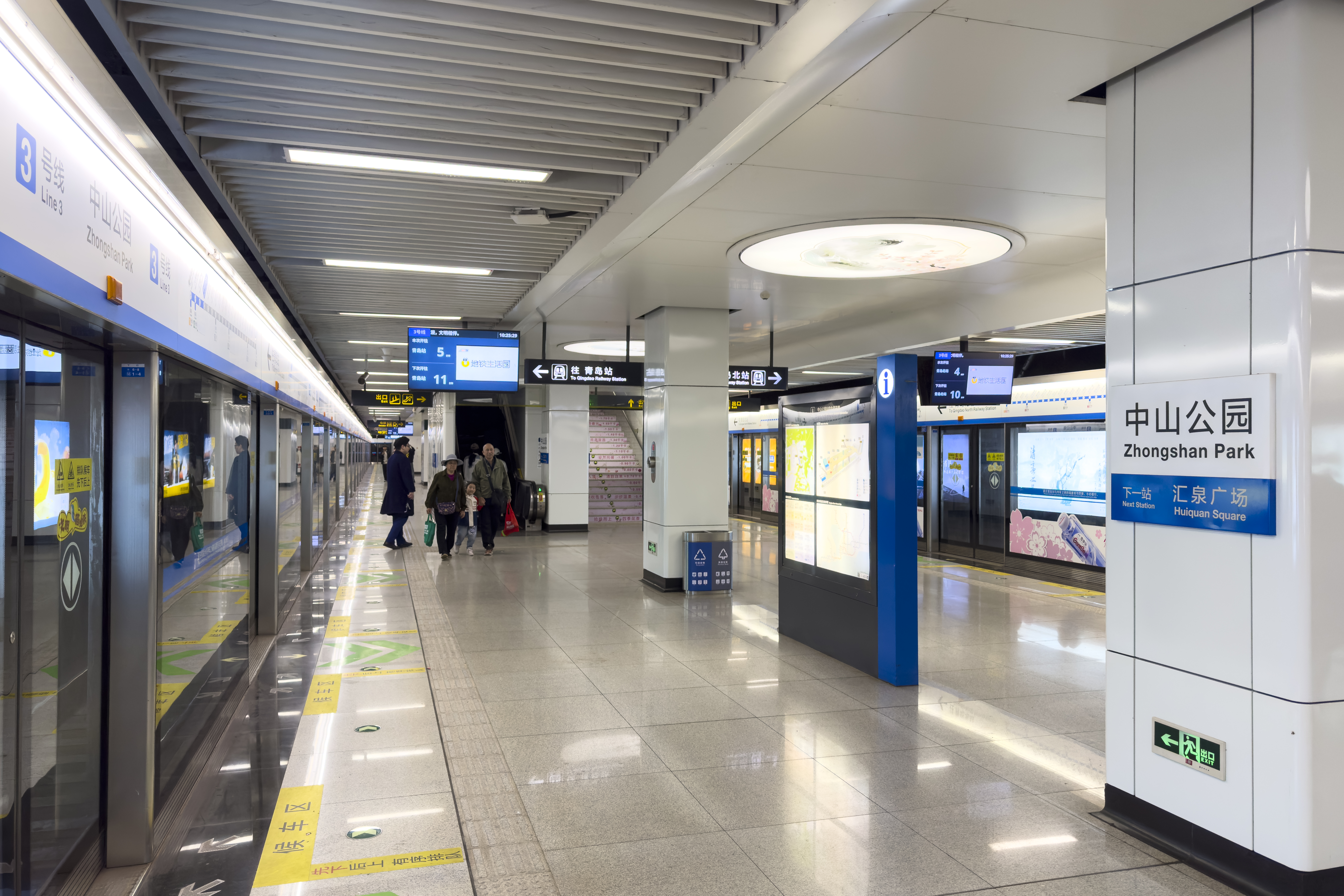
- Platform in May 2026

General information
- Location: Shinan District, Qingdao, Shandong; China
- Coordinates: 36.058333°N 120.346667°E
- Operator: Qingdao Metro Corporation
- Line: Line 3
- Platforms: 2 (1 island platform)

History
- Opened: 18 December 2016; 9 years ago

Services
Preceding station	Qingdao Metro	Following station
Huiquan Square towards Qingdao Railway Station	Line 3	Taipingjiao Park|Taipingjiao Park (Yiliao) towards Qingdao North Railway Station
Location

Zhongshan Park (Chinese: 中山公园) is a station on Line 3 of the Qingdao Metro. It opened on 18 December 2016.

== Gallery ==
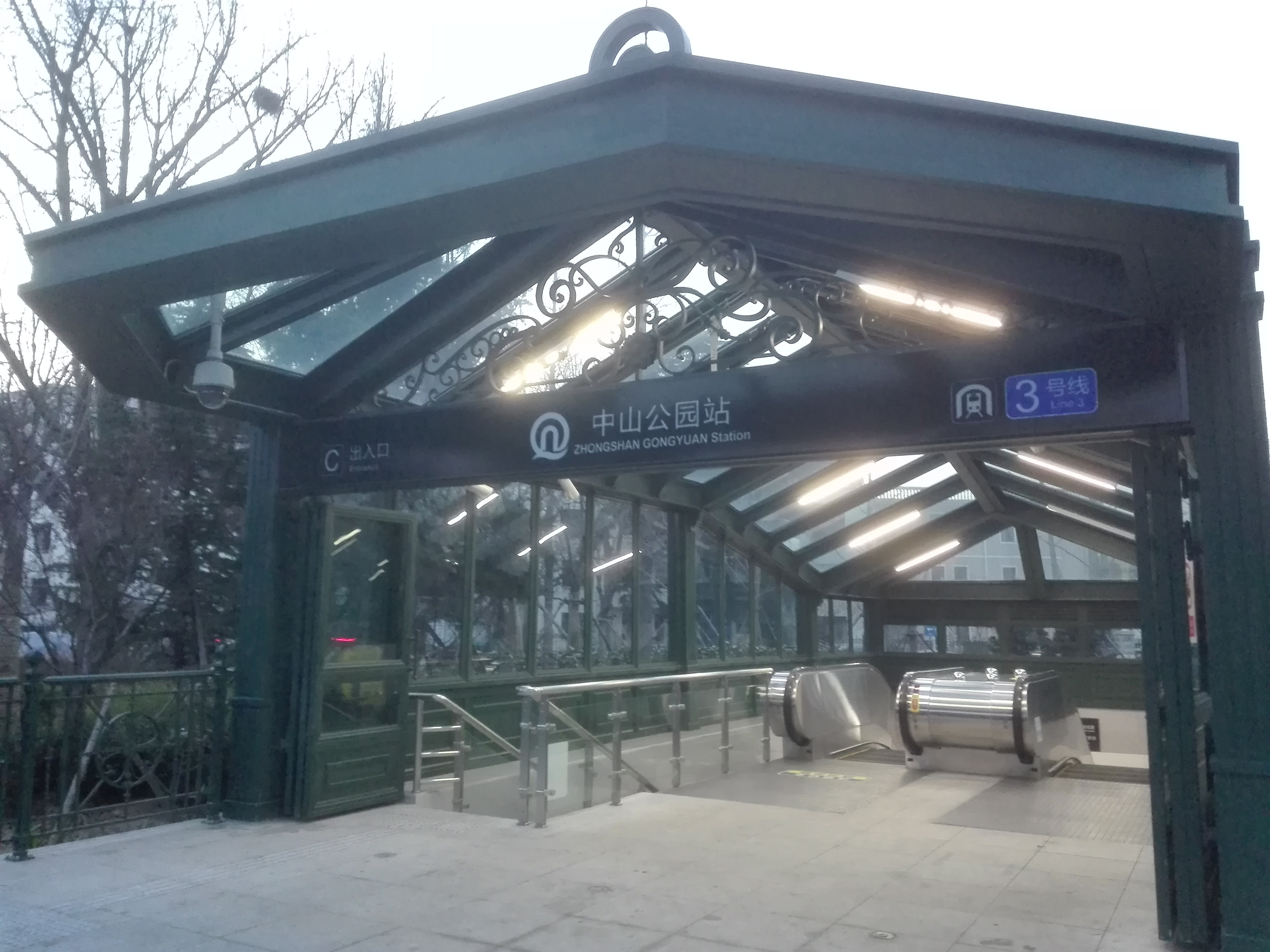
Entrance C

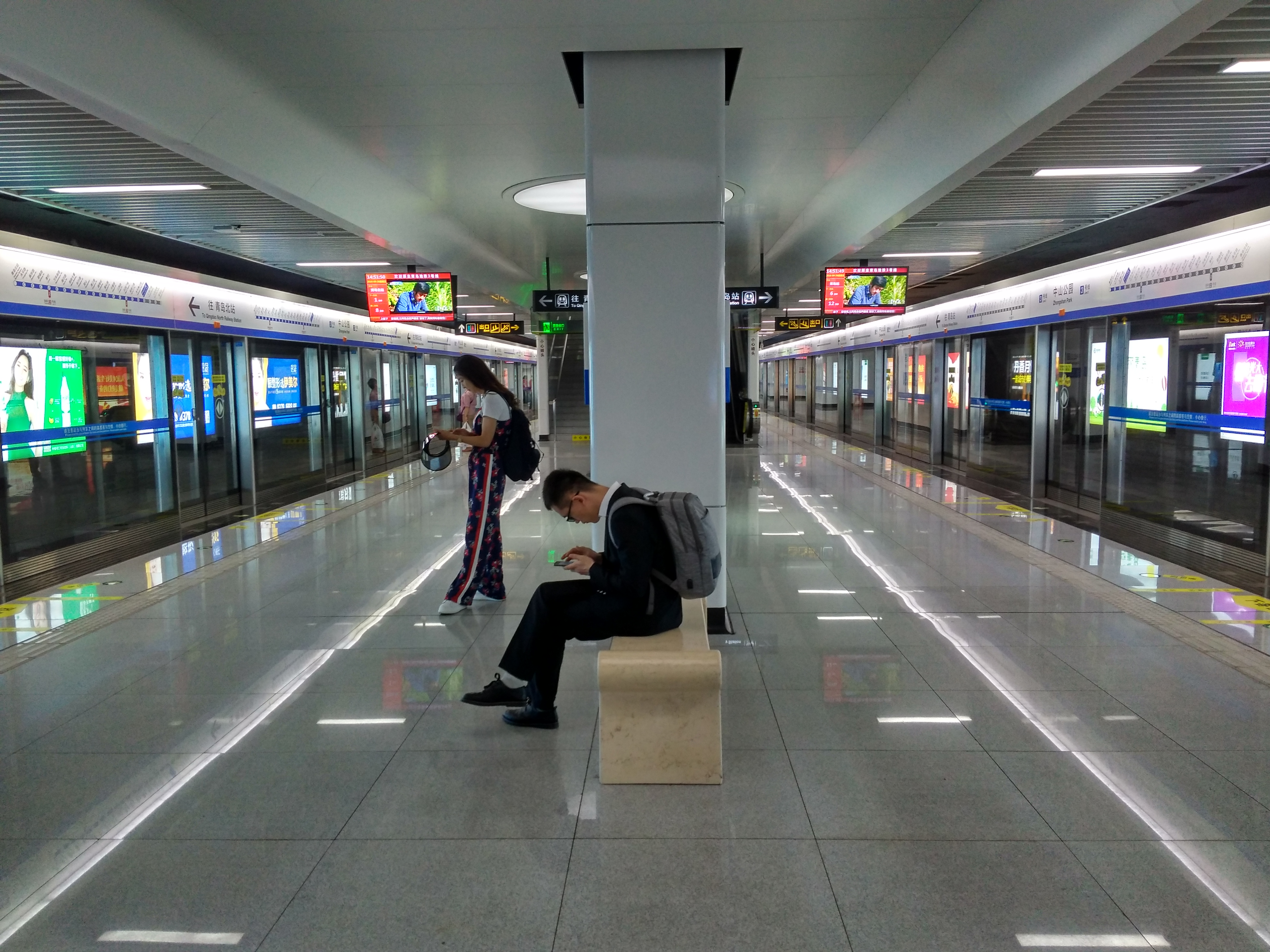
Platform
