= Hall of the People station =

Qingdao Metro station

Hall of the People 人民会堂
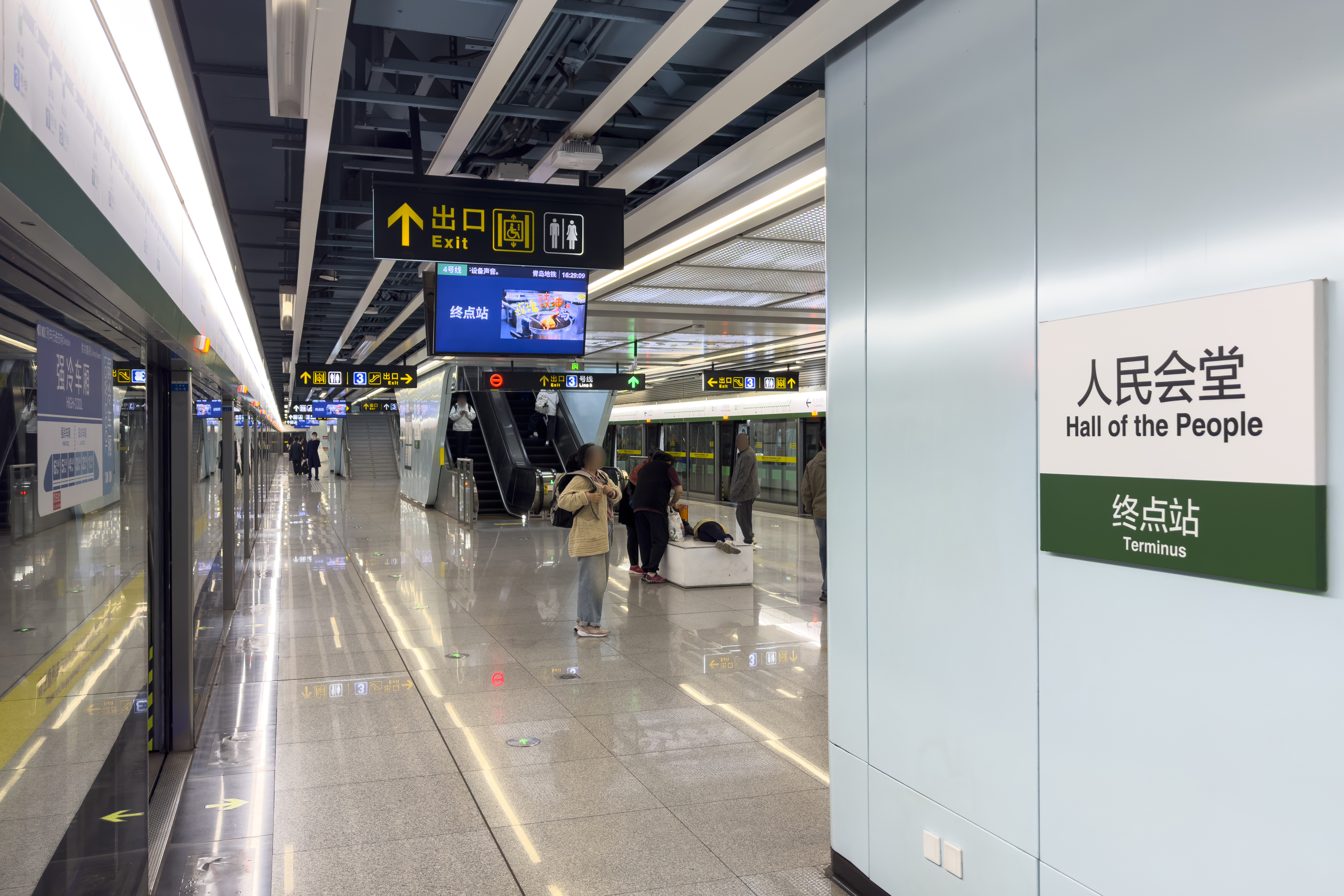
- Platform of Line 4

General information
- Location: Shinan District, Qingdao, Shandong; China
- Coordinates: 36°04′N 120°19′E
- Operator: Qingdao Metro Corporation
- Lines: Line 3 Line 4
- Platforms: 4 (2 island platforms)

History
- Opened: Line 3: 18 December 2016; 9 years ago Line 4: 26 December 2022; 3 years ago

Services
Preceding station	Qingdao Metro	Following station
Qingdao Railway Station Terminus	Line 3	Huiquan Square towards Qingdao North Railway Station
Terminus	Line 4	Xinhaoshan (The Affiliate Hospital of Qingdao University) towards Dahedong
Location

Hall of the People, formerly known as Renmin Huitang (Chinese: 人民会堂) is a station on Line 3 and Line 4 of the Qingdao Metro. It opened on 18 December 2016 for Line 3 and 26 December 2022 for Line 4.

== Gallery ==
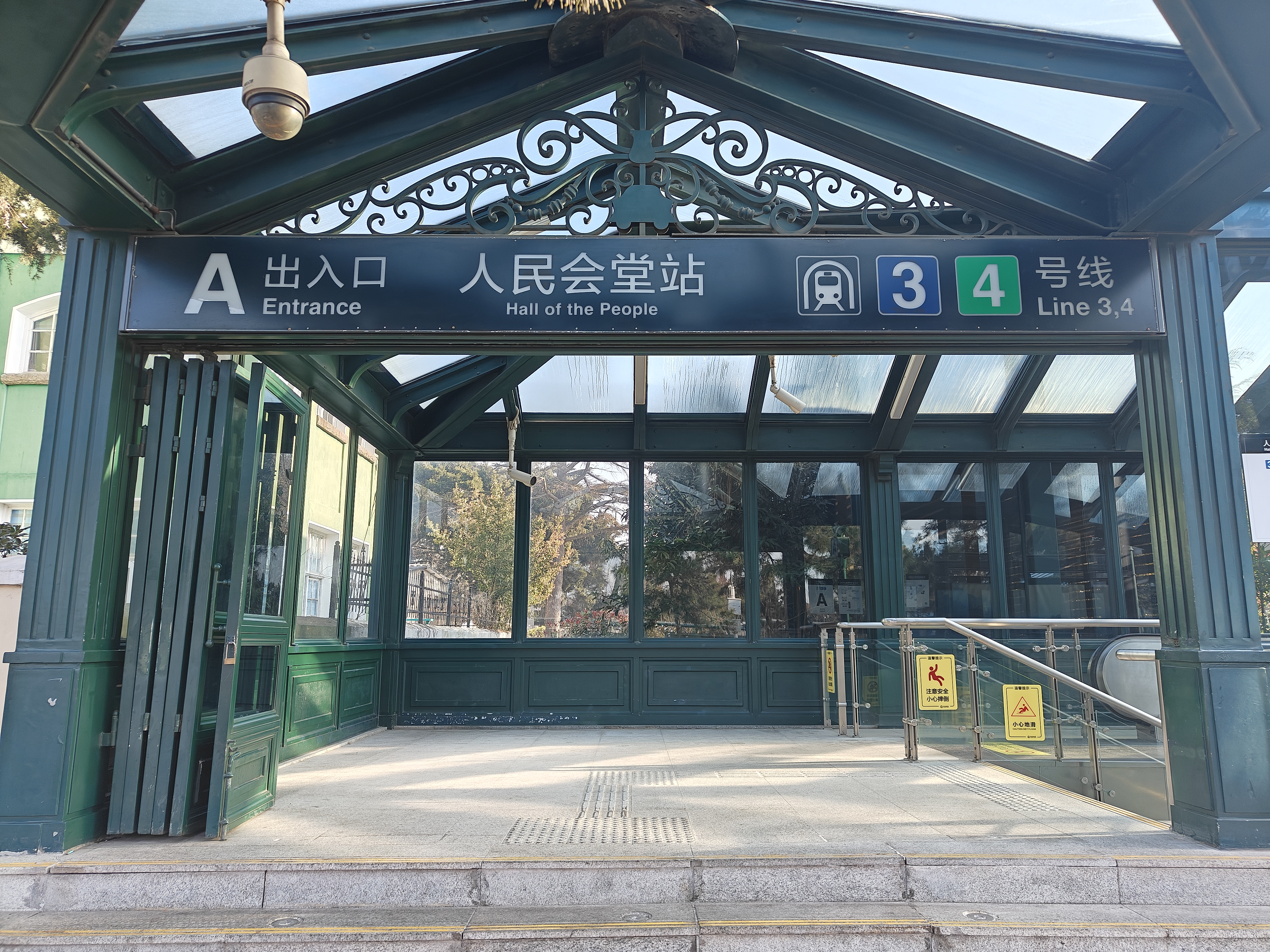
Entrance A

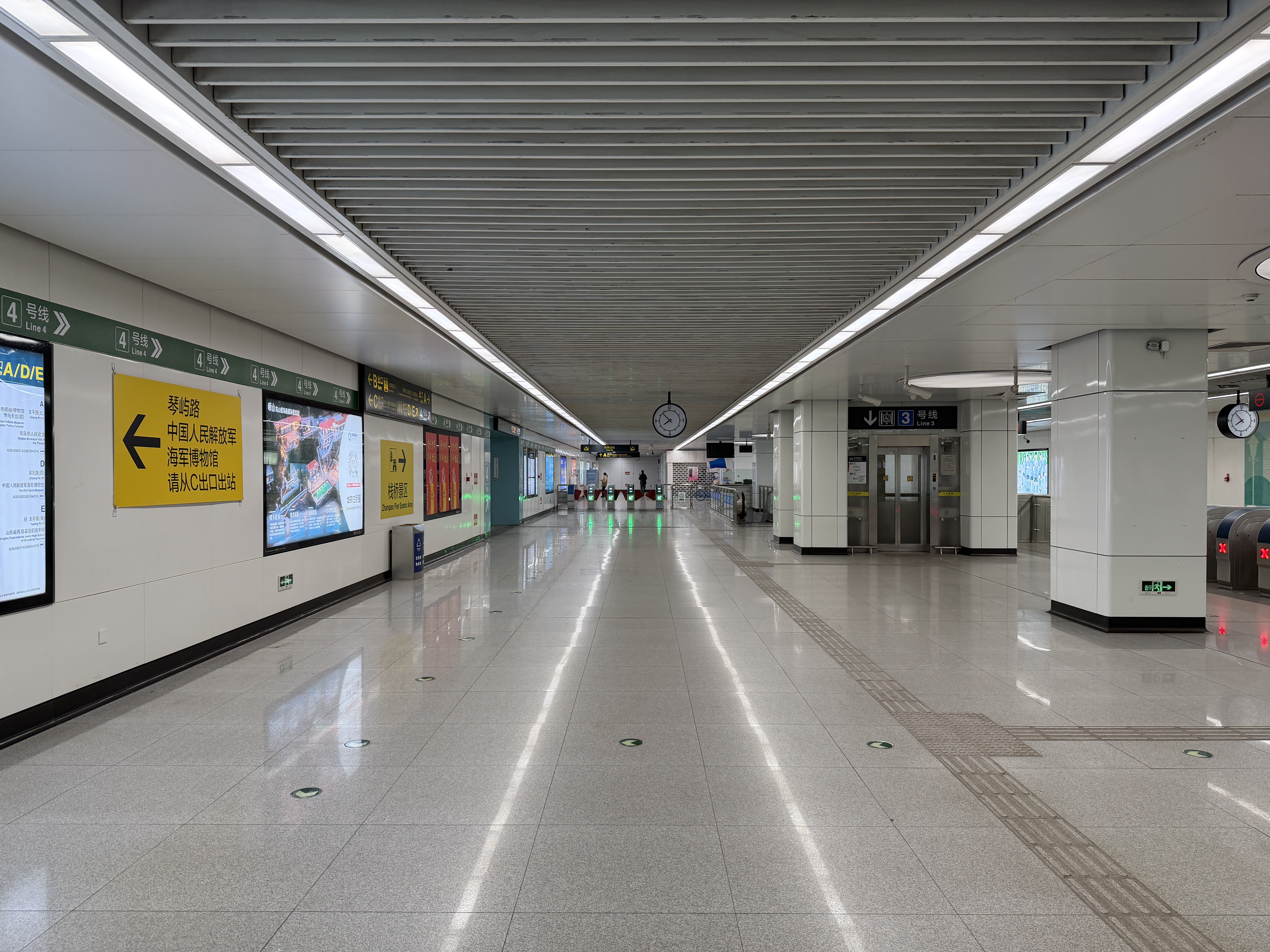
Line 3 Concourse

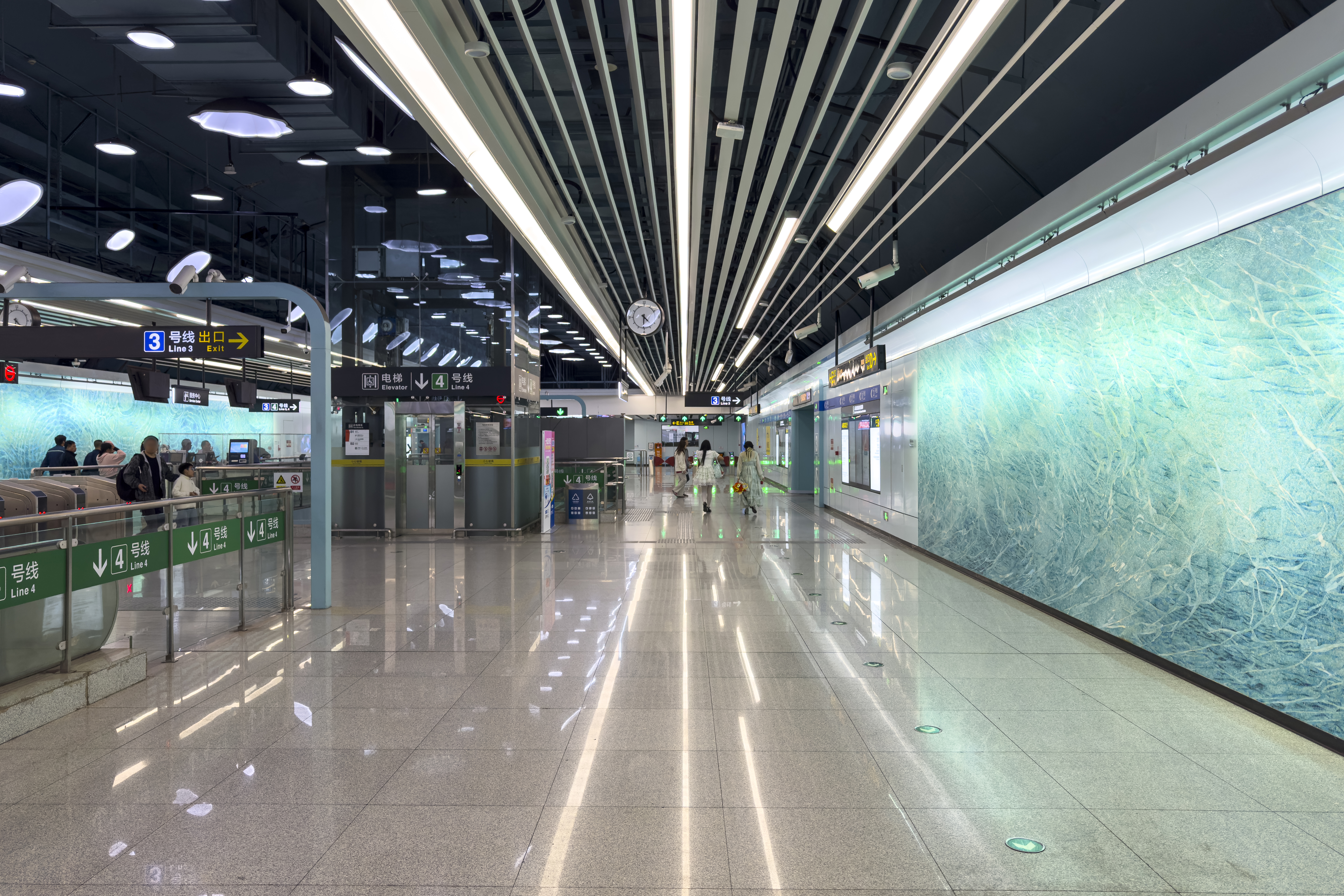
Line 4 Concourse

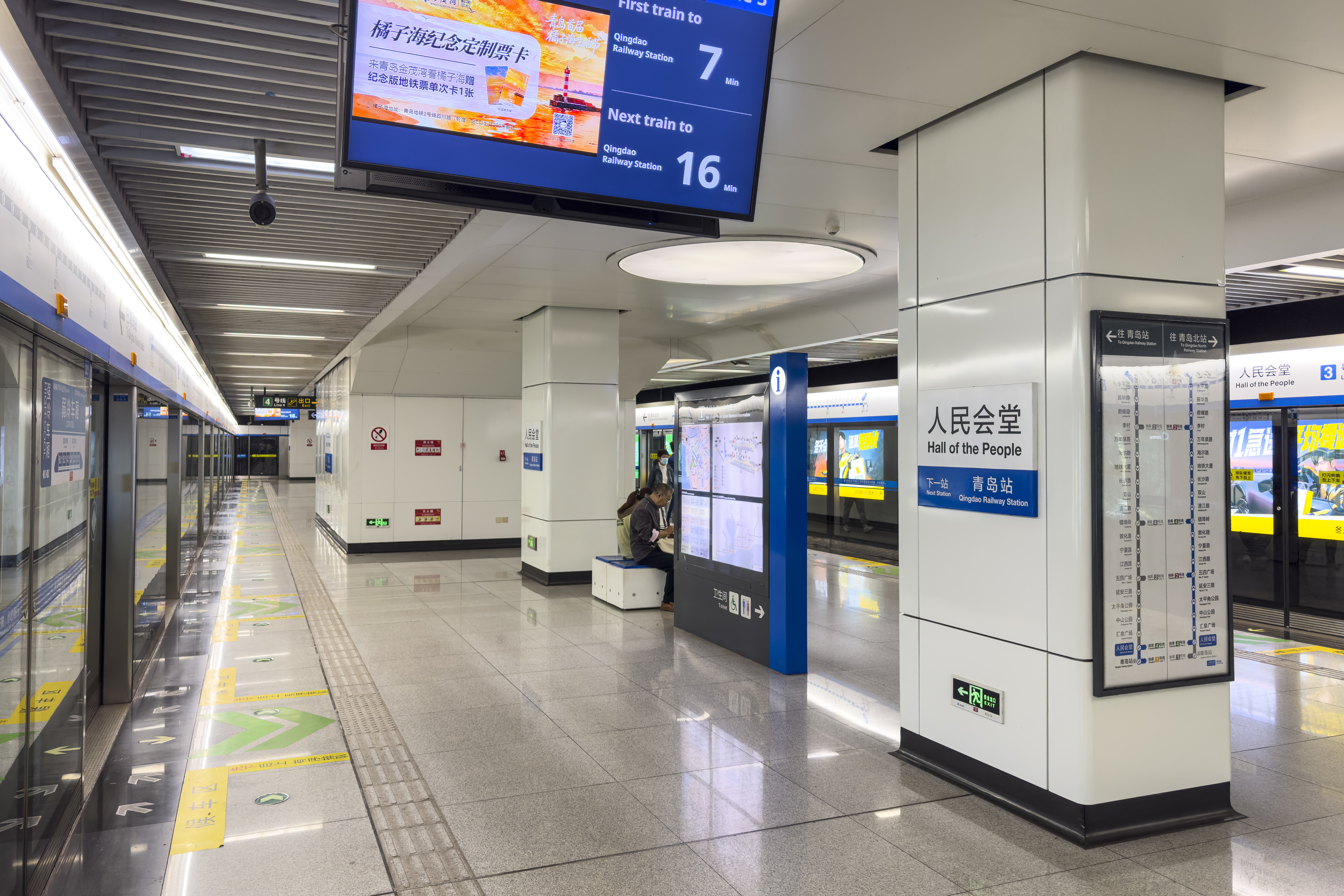
Line 3 platform
