= Taishan Road station =

Qingdao Metro station

Taishan Road 泰山路
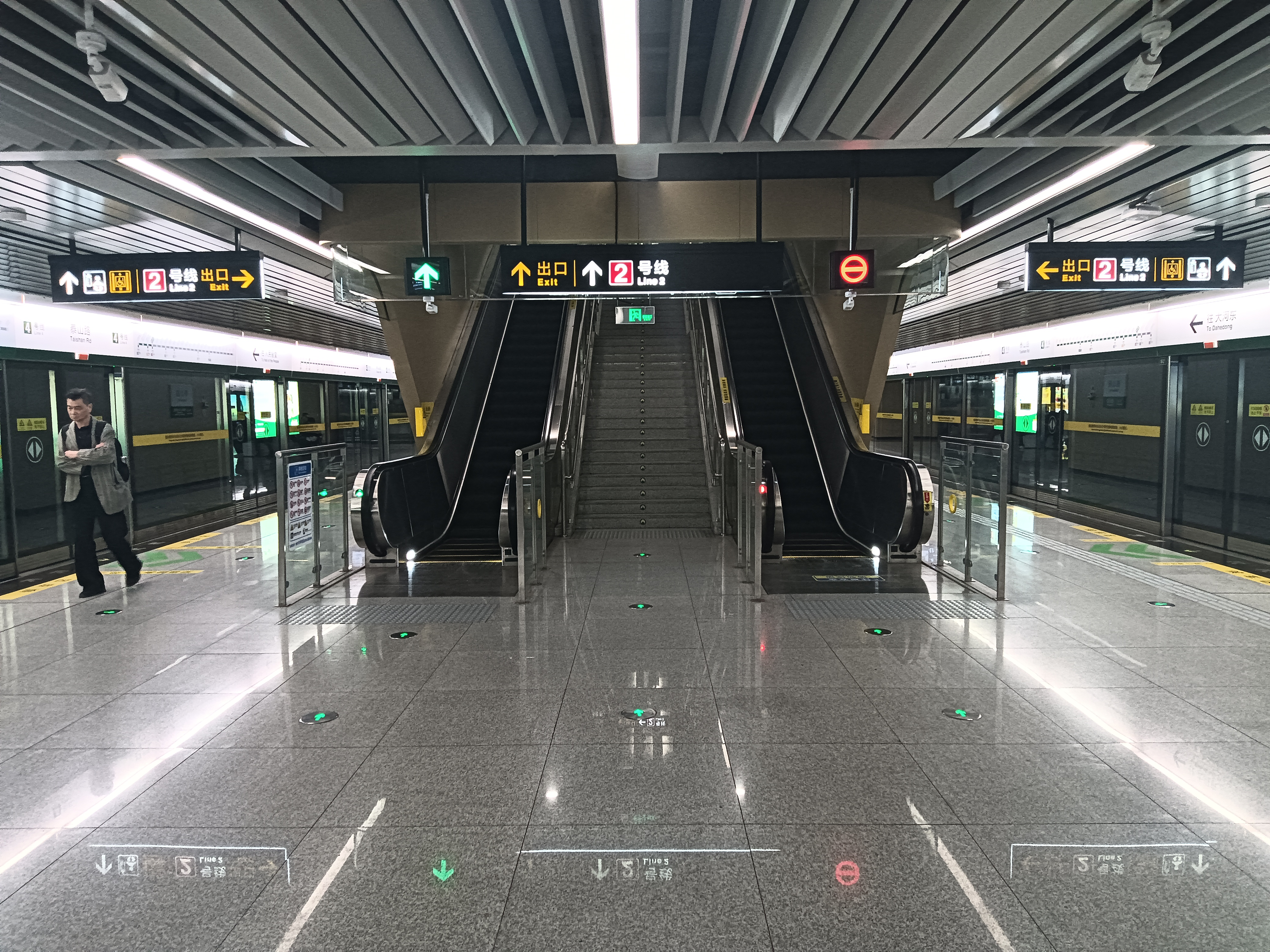
- Line 4 platform

General information
- Location: Shibei District, Qingdao, Shandong; China
- Operator: Qingdao Metro Corporation
- Lines: Line 2 Line 4
- Platforms: 4 (2 island platforms)

History
- Opened: 16 December 2019; 6 years ago

Services
Preceding station	Qingdao Metro	Following station
Qingdao International Cruise Terminal towards Sichuan Road (Qingdao Ferry Terminal)	Line 2	Lijin Road towards Licun Park
Guanxiangshan (Qingdao Municipal Hospital) towards Hall of the People	Line 4	Changle Road towards Dahedong
Location

Taishan Road (Chinese: 泰山路) is a station on Line 2 and Line 4 of the Qingdao Metro. It opened on 16 December 2019.

== Gallery ==
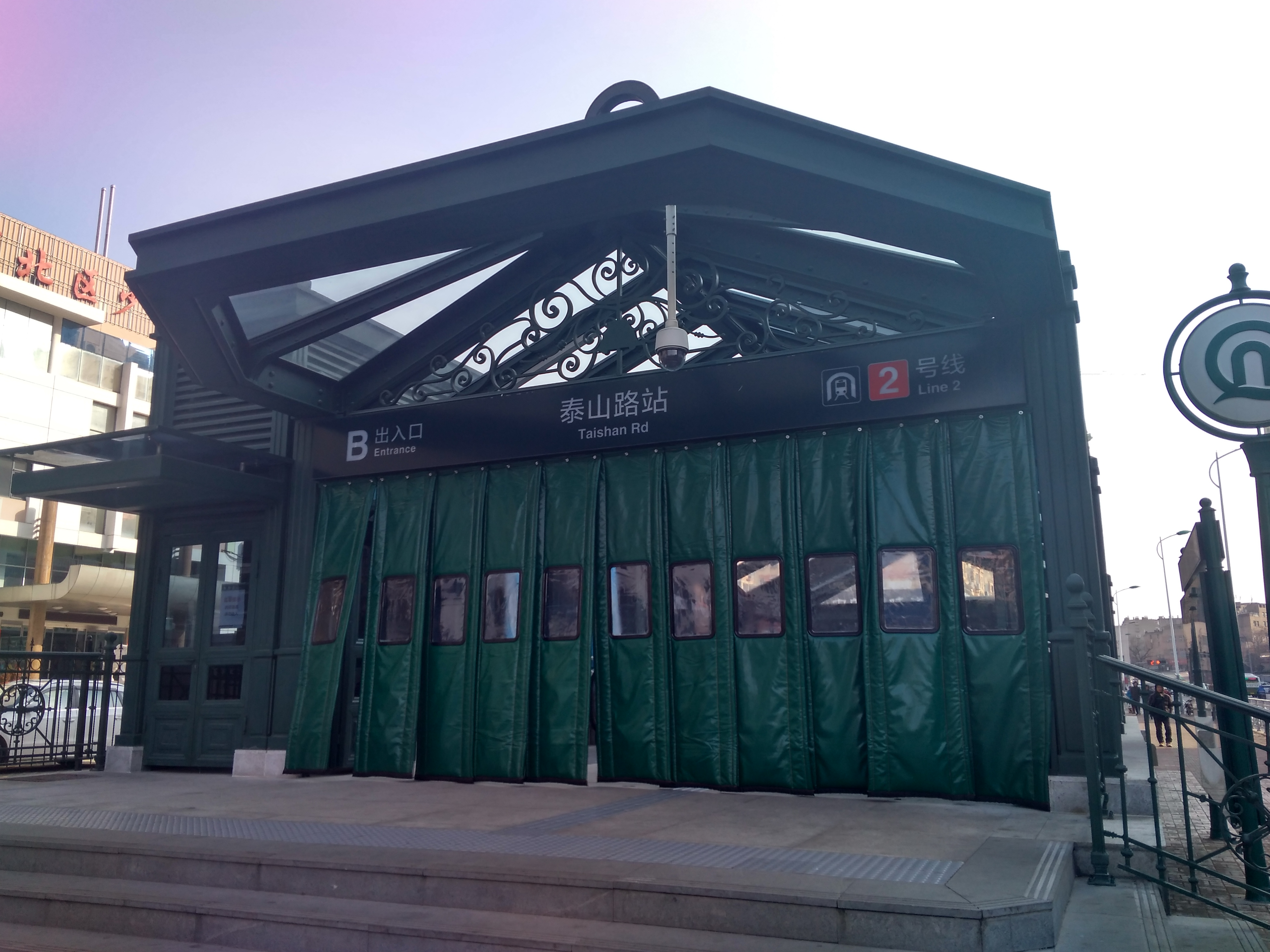
Entrance B

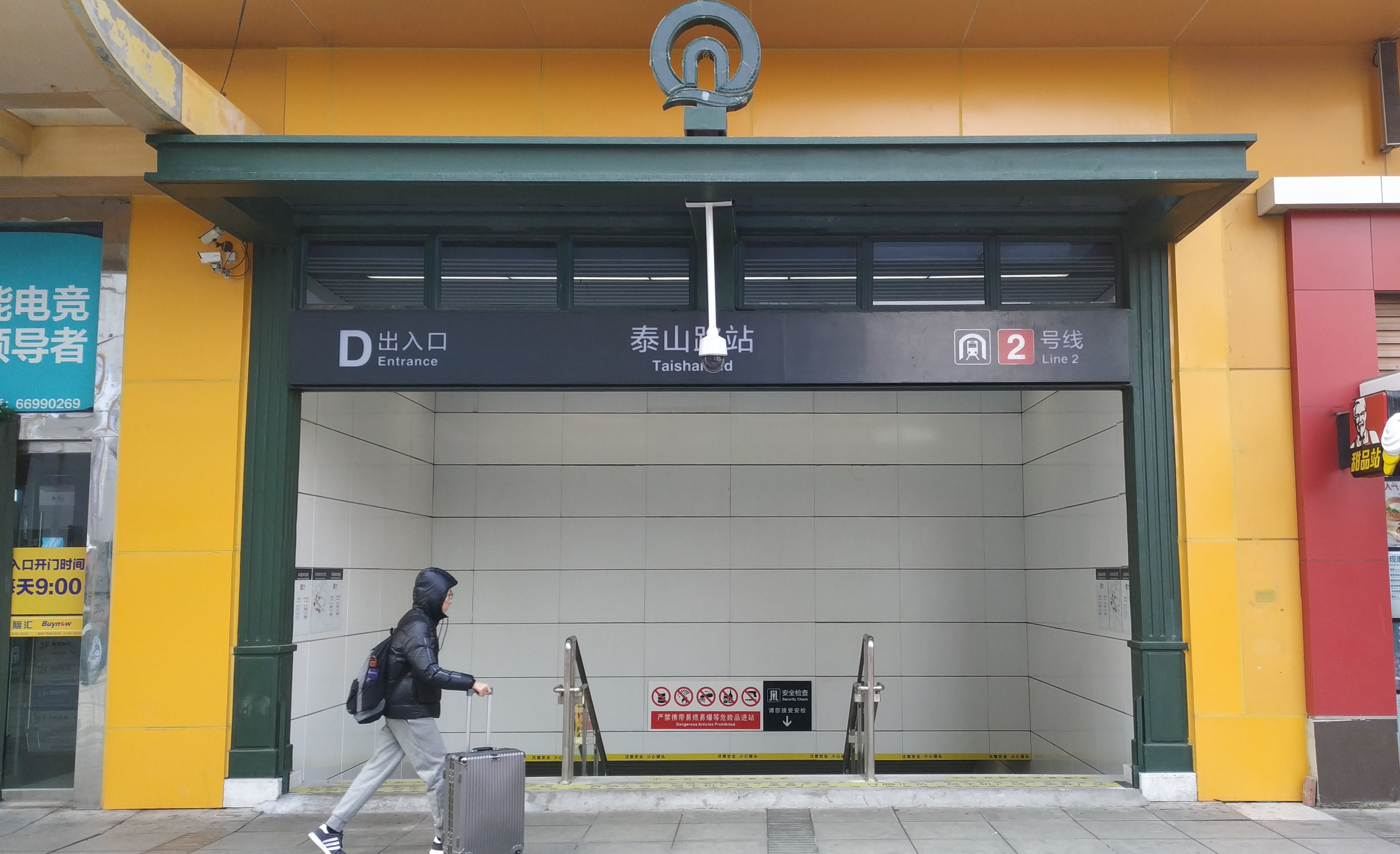
Entrance D

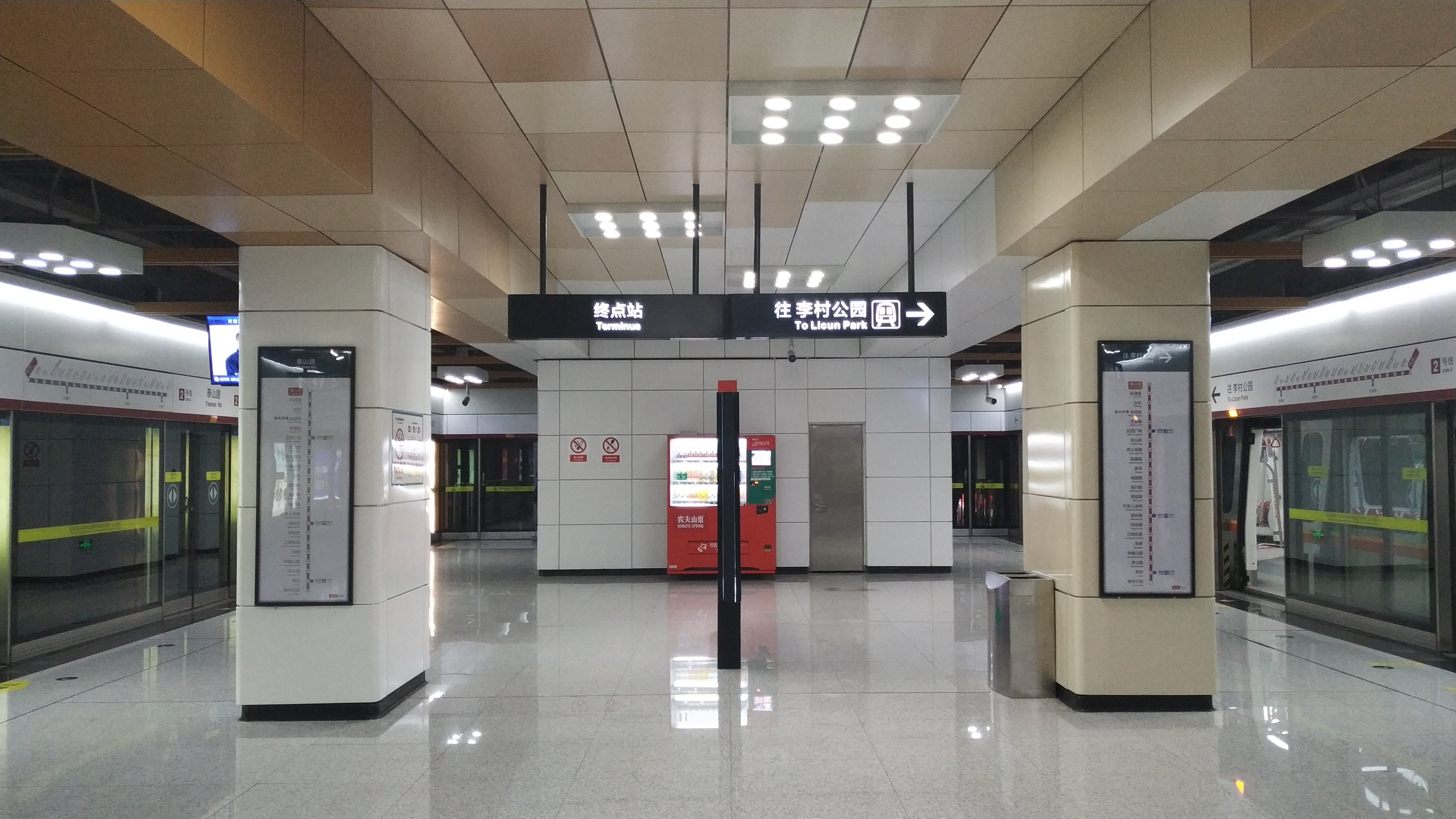
Line 2 platform
