= Changle railway station (Shandong) =

Railway station in Weifang City, Shandong, China

Changle 昌乐
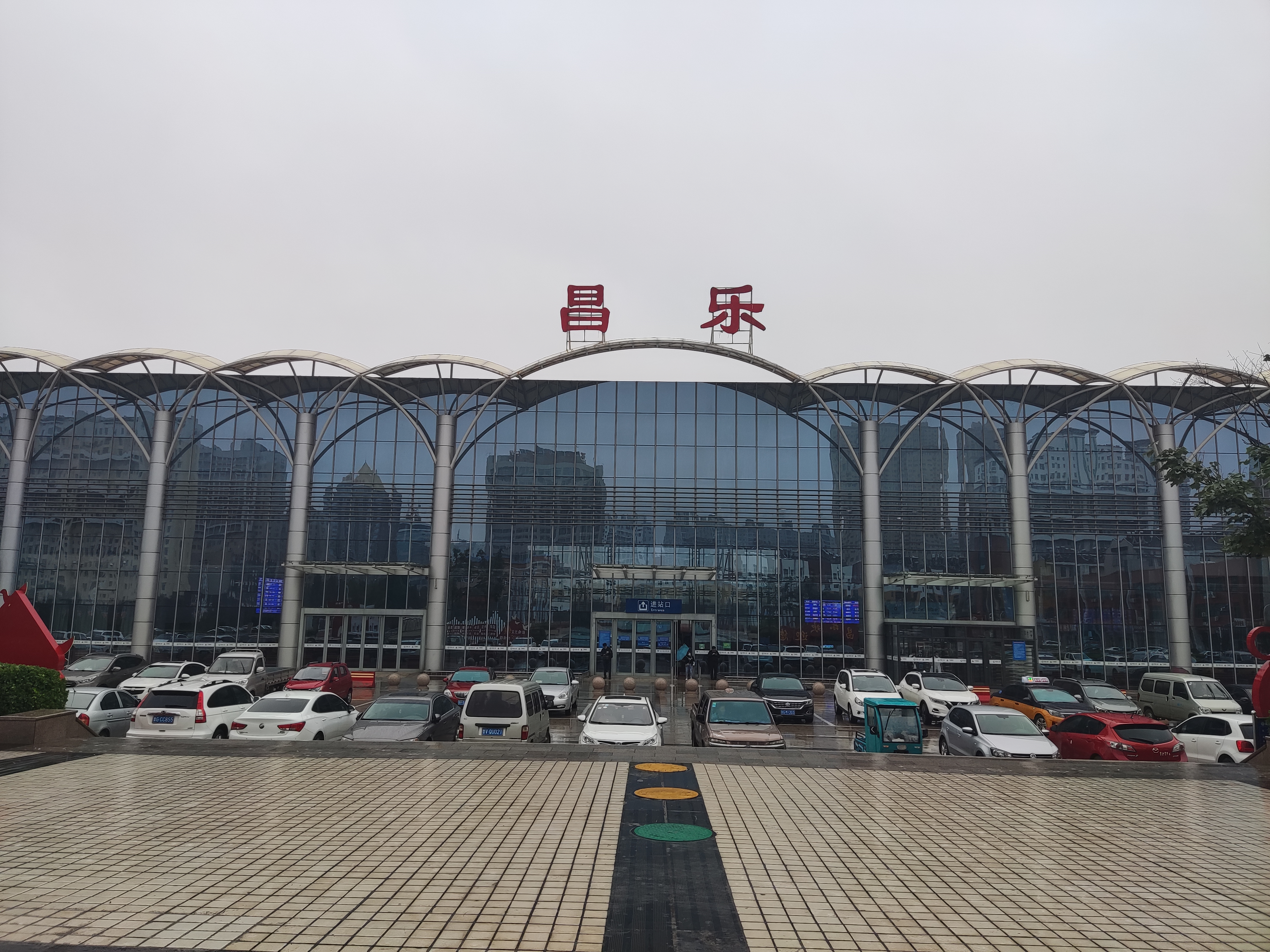

General information
- Location: Changle County, Weifang, Shandong; China
- Coordinates: 36°42′38″N 118°49′59″E
- Operated by: CR Jinan
- Lines: Qingdao–Jinan passenger railway; Qingdao–Jinan railway

Other information
- Station code: Telegraph code: CLK; Pinyin code: CLE
- Classification: 2nd class station

History
- Opened: 1903, reopened in 2010

Services
Preceding station	China Railway High-speed	Following station
Weifang towards Qingdao	Qingdao–Jinan passenger railway	Qingzhoushi towards Jinan
Location

Changle railway station (simplified Chinese: 昌乐站; traditional Chinese: 昌樂站; pinyin: Chānglè zhàn) is a railway station in Changle County, a part of Weifang City, Shandong. It is on the Qingdao–Jinan passenger railway and the Qingdao–Jinan railway.

== History ==
The station was built in 1903. In April 2005, the station was closed to allow for construction work along the line. It reopened on 10 October 2010.

== Service ==
Though a large number of regular passenger trains go through Changle County, there are only a few CRH trains (headed D or G) that stop at this station. Currently, passengers can reach Beijing South, Qingdao North/Qingdao, Rongcheng (in Weihai), and Jinan/Jinan West from here.
