= Gaomi railway station =

Railway station in Gaomi, China

Gaomi 高密
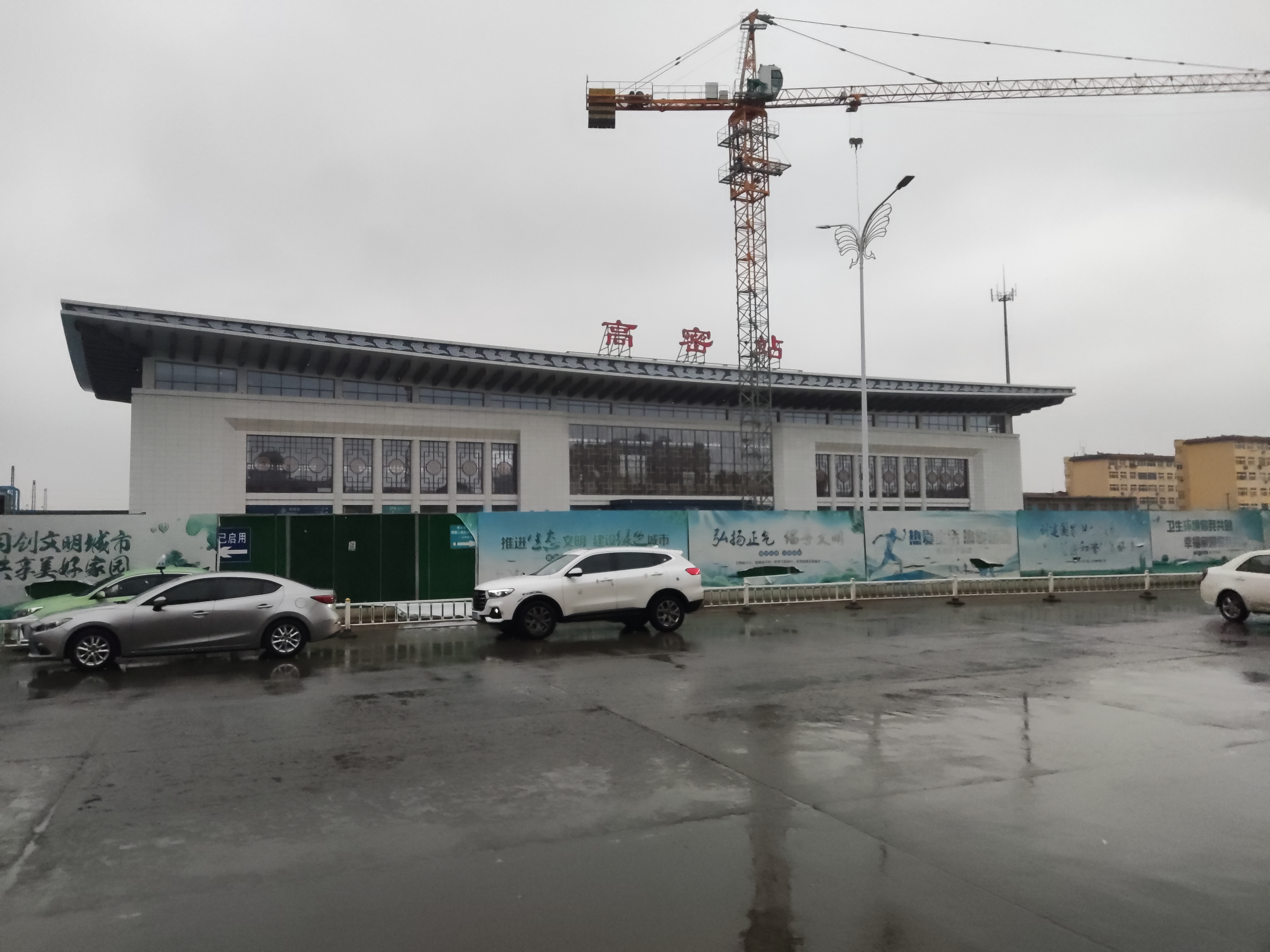

General information
- Location: Zhanqian Street, Gaomi, Shandong; China
- Coordinates: 36°23′34.52″N 119°45′44.88″E
- Operated by: CR Jinan
- Line: Qingdao–Jinan Passenger Railway Qingdao-Jinan Railway

Other information
- Station code: Telegraph code: GMK; Pinyin code: GMI
- Classification: 2nd class station

History
- Opened: 1901

Services
Preceding station	China Railway High-speed	Following station
Jiaozhoubei towards Qingdao	Qingdao–Jinan passenger railway	Weifang towards Jinan
Location

Gaomi railway station (Chinese: 高密站; pinyin: Gāomì zhàn) is a railway station in Gaomi, a county-level city under the administration of Weifang, Shandong. It is on the Qingdao-Jinan Passenger Railway (running CRH trains and passenger trains) and Qingdao-Jinan Railway (running freight trains and some passenger trains which give way to CRH trains).

== Service ==
All types of trains stop at Gaomi Station, ranging from regular trains (denoted without a letter) to the high-speed trains (denoted with a "G"). Regular trains mostly offer service throughout Shandong province, with destinations such as Cao County, Qingdao, and Yantai. A few trains also provide service to Shijiazhuang in Hebei province and Zhengzhou in Henan province.

High-speed trains also often stop at Gaomi, as it lies on the Qingdao-Jinan Passenger Railway. Most of these trains go to either terminal, Qingdao and Yantai or Jinan. However, a few trains do extend beyond the railway.
