= Weifang railway station =

Railway station in Weifang, Shandong, China

Weifang 潍坊
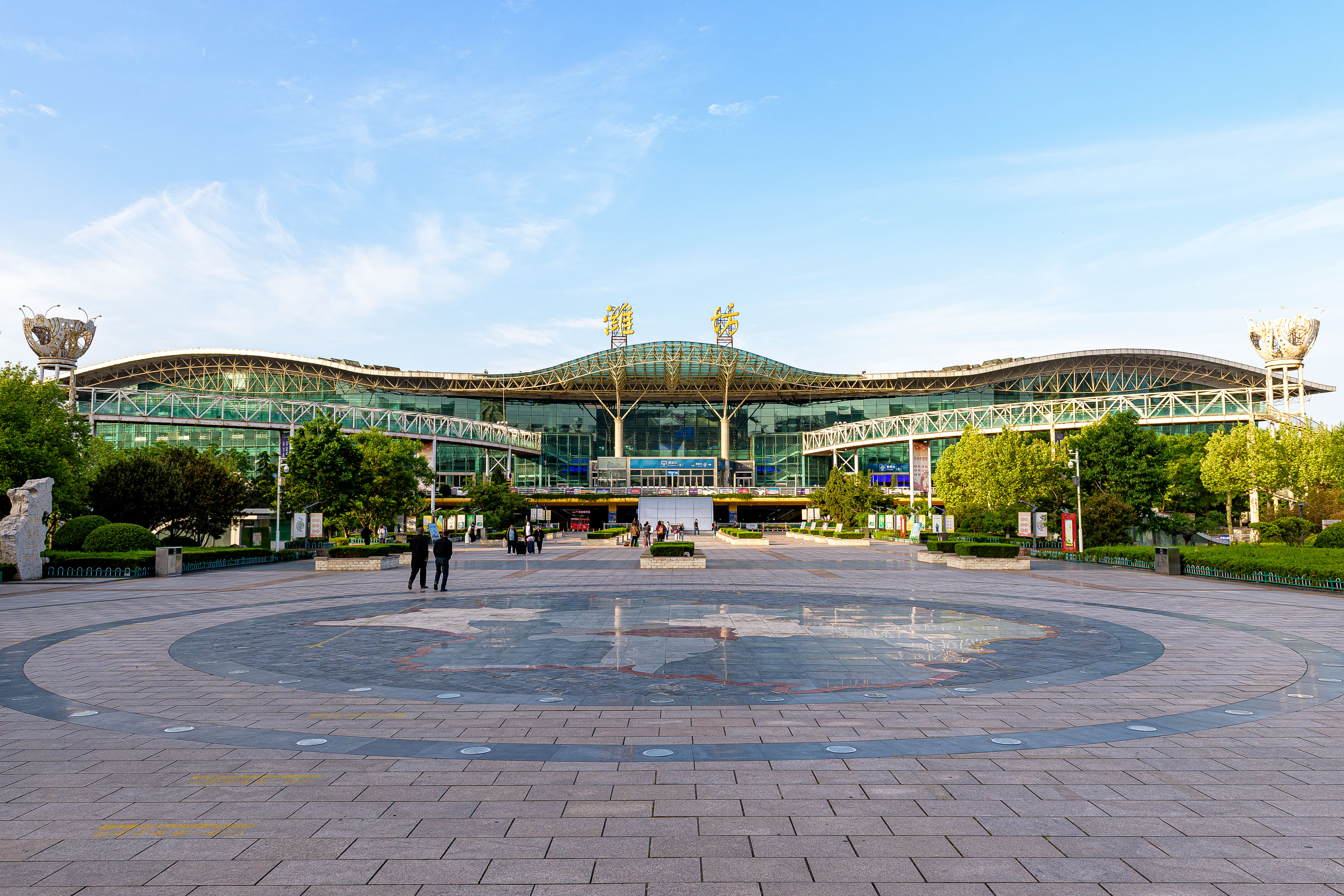
- North facade

General information
- Location: No.1, Heping Road, Weicheng District, Weifang, Shandong; China
- Coordinates: 36°41′45.83″N 119°5′30.94″E
- Operator: CR Jinan
- Line: Qingdao–Jinan passenger railway Qingdao–Jinan railway

Other information
- Station code: TMIS code: 17912; Telegraph code: WFK; Pinyin code: WFA
- Classification: 1st class station

History
- Opened: 1901, refurbished in 2005

Services
Preceding station	China Railway High-speed	Following station
Gaomi towards Qingdao	Qingdao–Jinan passenger railway	Changle towards Jinan
Location

The Weifang railway station (simplified Chinese: 潍坊站; traditional Chinese: 濰坊站; pinyin: Wéifāng zhàn) is a railway station in Weicheng District, Weifang, Shandong. It currently lies on the Qingdao–Jinan passenger railway (running CRH and passenger trains) and Qingdao–Jinan railway (running cargo trains and some passenger trains which give ways to CRH).

There is also a branch linking to Fangzi railway station in southern Fangzi District.

The city is also served by Weifang North railway station on high-speed lines, however it is located on the northern edge of the urban area.

== Service ==
All types of trains stop at Weifang Station, ranging from the common trains (denoted without a letter) to the high-speed CRH trains (denoted with a "G"). Due to the low constructing standard of Qingdao-Jinan passenger railway, "G" trains can only run at 200 km/h (120 mph), same as "D" trains(common CRH trains). The ticket price of "D"s and "G"s running on this railway is equally calculated as well. The common trains mainly offer service throughout Shandong province and major cities outside Shandong, with destinations such as Cao County, Qingdao, Yantai, Weihai and some stations have no high-speed train service.

Passengers can board the high-speed "G"-trains to Shanghai, Beijing, Changchun, Harbin, Guangzhou, Xi'an, Chengdu, Chongqing, Hangzhou, Fuzhou, etc.. On the westbound track, trains will first go to Jinan railway station before switching to the Beijing–Shanghai High-Speed Railway. There are also some lower-speed "D"-trains which run from Jinan to Qingdao, Yantai, Rongcheng(in Weihai), Longkou(in Yantai) and a few long routes to Shijiazhuang, Yuncheng and Taiyuan.
