= Qingzhoushi railway station =

Railway station in Qingzhou, Shandong, China

Qingzhoushi 青州市
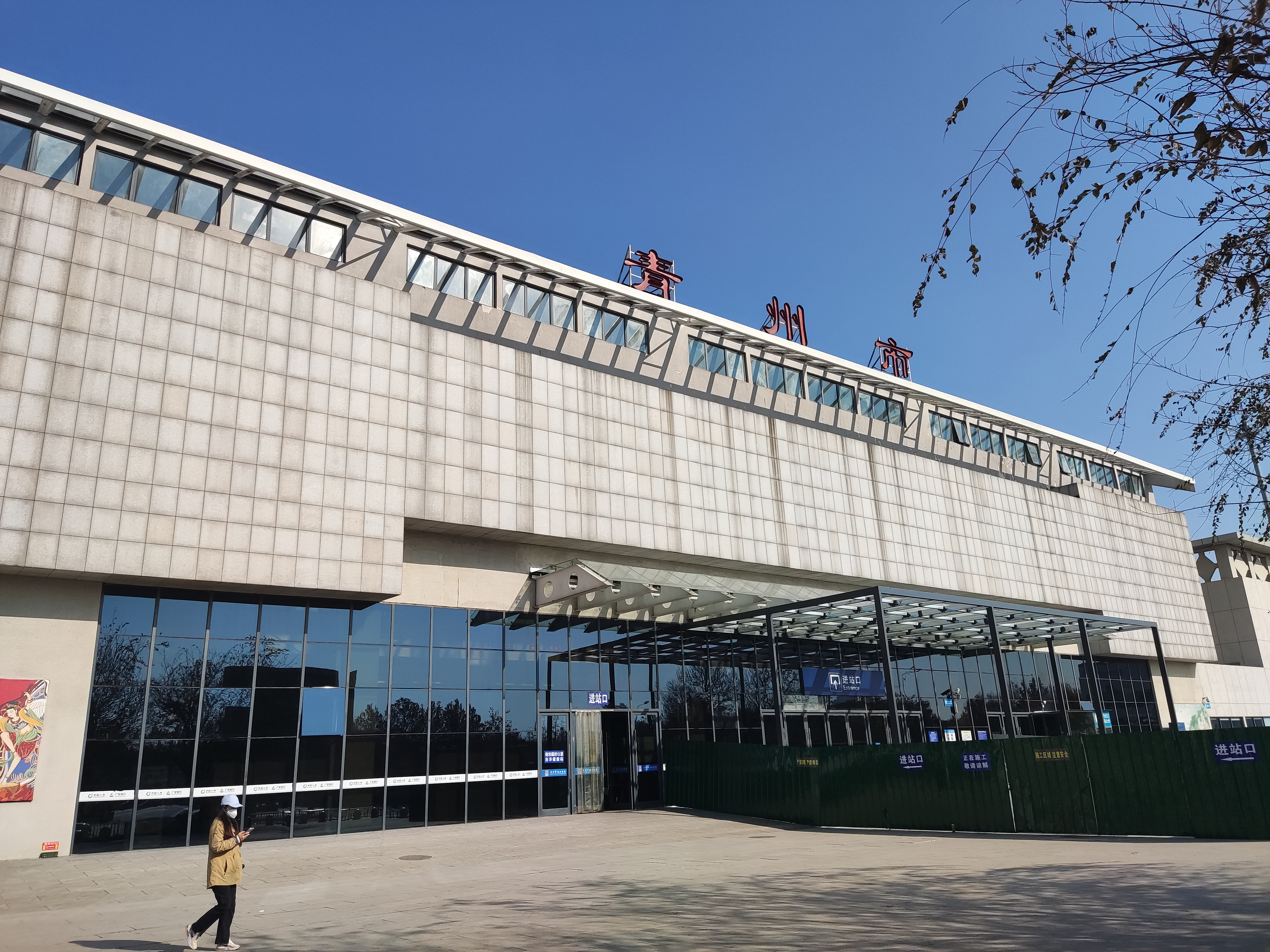

General information
- Other names: Qingzhou City
- Location: Qingzhou Economic and Technological Development Zone, Qingzhou, Shandong; China
- Coordinates: 36.77°N 118.5°E
- Operator: CR Jinan
- Line: Qingdao–Jinan Passenger Railway

Other information
- Station code: TMIS code: 17885; Telegraph code: QZK; Pinyin code: QZS
- Classification: 2nd class station

History
- Opened: 2008

Services
Preceding station	China Railway High-speed	Following station
Changle towards Qingdao	Qingdao–Jinan passenger railway	Zibo towards Jinan
Location
- Location within Shandong Location within China

Qingzhoushi railway station (Chinese: 青州市站; pinyin: Qīngzhōu shì zhàn) is a railway station in Qingzhou, a county-level city administered by Weifang City, Shandong. It is on the Qingdao-Jinan Passenger Railway.

== Service ==
All classes of trains stop at Qingzhou, from the slowest "general" trains (denoted without a letter) to the fastest high-speed trains (denoted with a "G" in front of the number). Currently, six general trains stop at the station, offering service to Qingdao, Yantai, Shijiazhuang in Hebei province, Zhengzhou in Henan province, and Wuhan in Hubei province. The "general-fast" trains (denoted with a letter "K") offer service to these cities and others throughout China, such as Xuzhou and Chengdu.

As this station is on the Qingdao-Jinan Passenger Railway, many high-speed trains also stop at this station. Most of them are "D" trains, which reach a maximum of 250 kilometres per hour (160 mph). These trains offer service to Qingdao, Jinan, Tianjin, and Beijing. Some of high-speed CRH trains("G" trains) also stop here. Although the maximum speed on the Qingdao-Jinan line is 250 km/h, these trains switch to the Beijing–Shanghai High-Speed Railway where they can reach speeds of 310 km/h (190 mph). Two of these trains go towards Shanghai Hongqiao railway station while the other two go to Qingdao railway station.
