= Zibo railway station =

Railway station in Zibo, China

Zibo 淄博
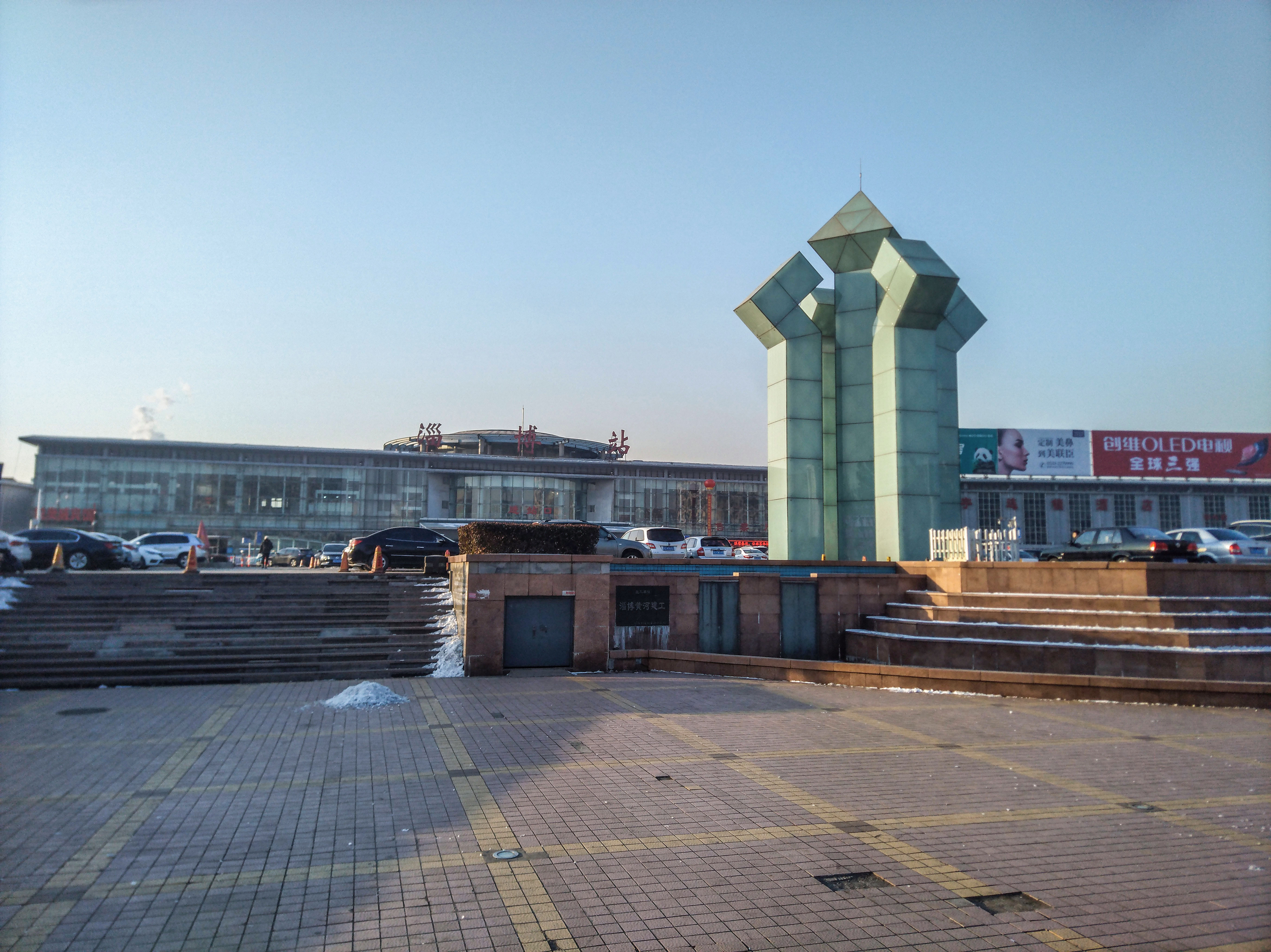

General information
- Location: Zhangdian District, Zibo, Shandong; China
- Coordinates: 36.7887°N 118.0510°E
- Operated by: CR Jinan
- Lines: Qingdao–Yinchuan corridor, Xindian–Taian railway, Qingdao–Jinan passenger railway, Zibo–Dongying railway

Other information
- Station code: TMIS code: 17885; Telegraph code: ZBK; Pinyin code: ZBO
- Classification: First-class station

History
- Opened: 1974
Location

Zibo Railway Station is a first-class railway station in Zhangdian District, Zibo, Shandong, operated by China Railway Jinan Group. It has four platforms and 15 tracks. The annual passenger traffic is 6.2 million. It is a part of the Qingdao–Yinchuan corridor, Xindian–Taian railway, Qingdao–Jinan passenger railway and Zibo–Dongying railway.

On 16 September 2022, a new station building to the south of the line was opened.

Preceding station	China Railway High-speed	Following station
Qingzhoushi towards Qingdao	Qingdao–Jinan passenger railway	Zhangqiu towards Jinan
