= Z7/8 Beijing–Qingdao through train =

Train service between Beijing and Qingdao, China

The Z7/8 Beijing–Qingdao through train (Chinese:Z7/8次北京到青岛北直达特快列车) was a former China Railway express passenger train service running between the country's capital Beijing and Qingdao operated by the Beijing Railway Bureau, with the Beijing Passenger Segment responsible for passenger transport tasks. 25T Type passenger cars were used, running along the Jiaoji Railway and Jinghu Railway across Shandong, Hebei, Tianjin, and Beijing, covering the entire 873 km. Beijing railway station to Qingdao North railway station took 8 hours and 41 minutes, using the train number Z7; Qingdao North railway station to Beijing railway station took 9 hours and 19 minutes, using the train number Z8. Currently, this service bears the train numbers D25/26, operated with CR200J trainsets.

== Carriages ==
Carriage number	1－9	10	11－16	17-18
Type of carriages	RW25T; Soft sleeper (Chinese: 软卧车)	CA25T; Dining car (Chinese: 餐车)	RW25T; Soft sleeper (Chinese: 软卧车)	RZ25T; Soft seat (Chinese: 软座车)

== Locomotives ==
Sections	Beijing－Qingdao North
Locomotives and their allocation	DF11G diesel locomotive Beijing Railway Bureau Beijing Depot (Chinese: 京局京段)

== Timetable ==
Z7		Stops	Z8	
Arrive	Depart	Stops	Arrive	Depart
—	22:10	Beijing	06:19	—
22:50	22:52	Langfang North	05:31	05:34
23:30	23:33	Tianjin West	04:56	04:59
00:30	00:32	Cangzhou	↑	↑
03:10	03:17	Jinan East	00:41	01:01
04:19	04:21	Zibo	23:30	23:34
05:21	05:23	Weifang	21:27	22:33
06:51	—	Qingdao North	—	21:00

== See also ==
- Beijing-Qingdao Through Train
