= Zibo train collision =

2008 railway accident in China

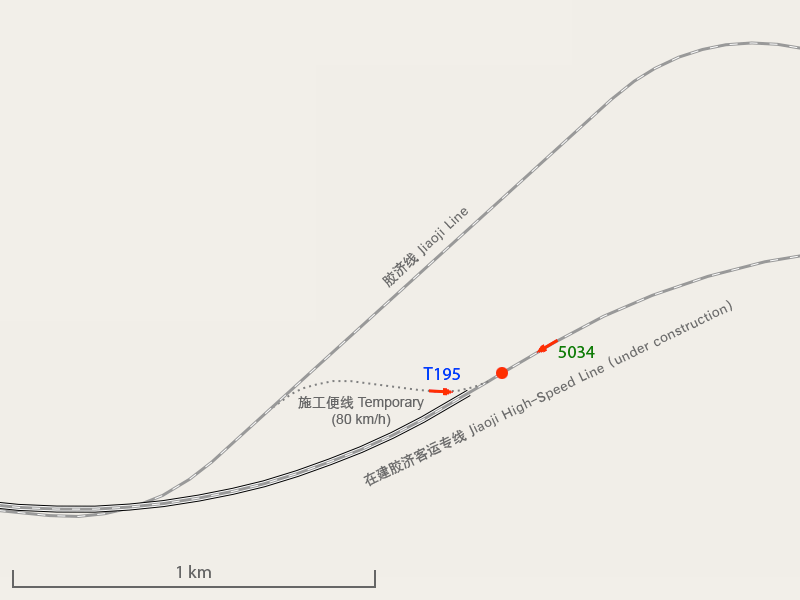

Details
- Date: April 28, 2008; 04:38 CST (20:34 UTC, April 27)
- Location: Near Zibo, Shandong province
- Coordinates: 36°41′35″N 117°46′53″E
- Country: People's Republic of China
- Line: Jiaoji Railway
- Operator: China Railways
- Incident type: Collision
- Cause: Speeding and derailment

Statistics
- Trains: 2
- Deaths: 72
- Injured: 416

The Zibo train collision (Chinese: “4·28”胶济铁路特别重大交通事故) was a major train collision that occurred on the morning of April 28, 2008, near the city of Zibo, in Shandong province, People's Republic of China. The collision occurred on the Jiaoji Railway, which links the important cities of Qingdao and Jinan in Shandong province. With a death toll of 72 people and 416 injuries, the collision was the deadliest rail accident in the People's Republic of China since a 1997 accident in Hunan.

== Context ==
The Jiaoji railway is a trunk line that is about a century old, built originally by Germans in the area during the late Qing dynasty. The collision gained international attention as Beijing was preparing to host the 2008 Olympics, and occurred during the Olympic torch relay. It was notable also as the deadliest accident of China's railway system since an accident in Hunan in April 1997. It was the second accident on the Jiaoji Railway line during 2008, the first involving a train that killed 18 railway workers in January.

== Synopsis ==
Train T195 was an express passenger train from Beijing to Sifang railway station in Qingdao. It derailed at 04:38 China Standard Time (CST) on the inside (left) track around a bend due to excessive speed, at around 500 meters east of Wangcun Railway Station. In all, carriages 10 to 18 derailed on the scene.

Those in carriages one to nine were relatively unaffected. Train 5034 was a regular passenger train from Yantai destined for Xuzhou, coming from the other direction on the outside track at the regulated speed of 80 km/h. As the derailment of T195 became visible to the drivers, it was too late to stop the train. Train 5034 collided with the derailed cars at the K290+940 meters mileage marker on the double-tracked Jiaoji Railway at approximately 04:41 CST, three minutes after the derailment of T195. At this point, cars nine to 16 of T195 derailed and blocked the parallel track that Train 5034 was on. The first three cars of Train 5034 reportedly fell into a ditch.

As Train T195 derailed, it turned 90 degrees on its side. As most people were asleep during the time of the derailment, some only became aware after the incident had occurred. As passengers exited, many around the area were making frantic calls on their mobile telephones, temporarily causing a malfunction of the local telephone network.

The collision caused 72 fatalities and 416 injuries. It occurred when train T195 was on a section of the railway track undergoing maintenance ahead of the 2008 Olympics. The section was a temporary railway and the speed limit was 80 km/h (50 mph), but T195 was traveling at 131 km/h (81 mph).

== Timeline ==
- March 2008 – Jinan Railway Bureau issued traffic control command number 4240, limiting the speed of Jiaoji railway K290+784 – K293+780 temporarily to 80 km/h.
- April 23 – Jinan railway bureau issued traffic control file number 154, changing the railroad territory from April 28, changing the speed limit K290+784 – K293+780 from temporary to long-term limit. This file was only published on Jinan railway bureau's website and delivered by a relatively slow post mail, and Beijing Railway Bureau was in the cc. list.
- April 26 – Jinan railway bureau issued traffic control command number 4158, canceling temporary traffic control commands that were previously issued including command 4240. This command arrived earlier than file 154, so that the speed limit for train T195 in that section of railway was restored to 140 km/h.
- The driver of train 2245 reported to the duty man in Zhoucun railway station about the conflict between the command and the file.
- April 28 ~02:30 – Lu Min, the director in duty of Jinan west train schedule duty room, reported to the scheduler in duty, the train 2557's driver noticed the speed limit sign was 80 km/h while the LKJ transport monitor on train displayed as 120 km/h when he was passing down Zhoucun–Wangcun in K293+780M–K290+784M.
- April 28 ~02:35 – Pu Xiaojun, the train scheduler in duty, immediately telephoned Wu Haichun, the director in duty of Jinan Jinan locomotive terminal about the speed limit. Wu Haichun said, the train 2245's driver had also reported to him about the problem. The scheduler asked about the speed limit in transport monitor, but Wu said he did not know because the one who is able to change the chip is not directed by the locomotive terminal, but by the electrical terminal.
- April 28 ~02:40 – The scheduler told to the driver of the next train, train 5025, when passing the railway section, if the speed limit shown by the signal is different from the speed limit in train's LKJ (Cab signalling) monitor, passing the section at speed of 80 km/h.
- April 28 ~03:00 – Pu Xiaojun, the scheduler in duty, asked Zhoucun East and Wangcun stations' schedulers to tell train drivers for "up and down" directions, passing the railway section still under the requirement of commands 4240 and 4241 at 80 km/h.
- April 28 ~03:50 – Sui Fuhai, another scheduler in duty, asked train T25's driver what the speed limit was between Wangcun and Zhoucun East. The driver had not passed that section, so he told the scheduler he did not know about it. Then Sui asked the driver to limit the speed to 80 km/h there. When the train passed, the driver told the scheduler the onboard system was shown as limited to 145 km/h there.
- April 28 ~03:55 – Sui Fuhai asked, "Hello, T195's driver. Do you have the speed limit of Zhoucun east to Wangcun downward line?", the driver replied, "Where?" Sui said, "Between Wangcun and Zhoucun east," The driver said, "I have the limit between Wangcun and Zhoucun east," Sui said, "You have it, haven't you?" The driver confirmed, "Yes, (as in command) 4241," Sui said, "4241 or 4240?" T195's driver said, "4240." Since train T195 was late, Sui asked the driver to drive faster, "Do rush on the way." The driver confirmed.
- April 28 04:02 – Jinan railway bureau issued command 4444 to reaffirm 80 km/h speed limit of railway K290+784 – K293+780, but the traffic control command was not sent to train T195.
- April 28 05:30 after the accident – For understanding the cause of the accident, scheduler Pu Xiaojun asked Wangcun station's scheduler Zhang Fasheng, where he sent the control command to the driver, and he said it had been sent.

== Response ==
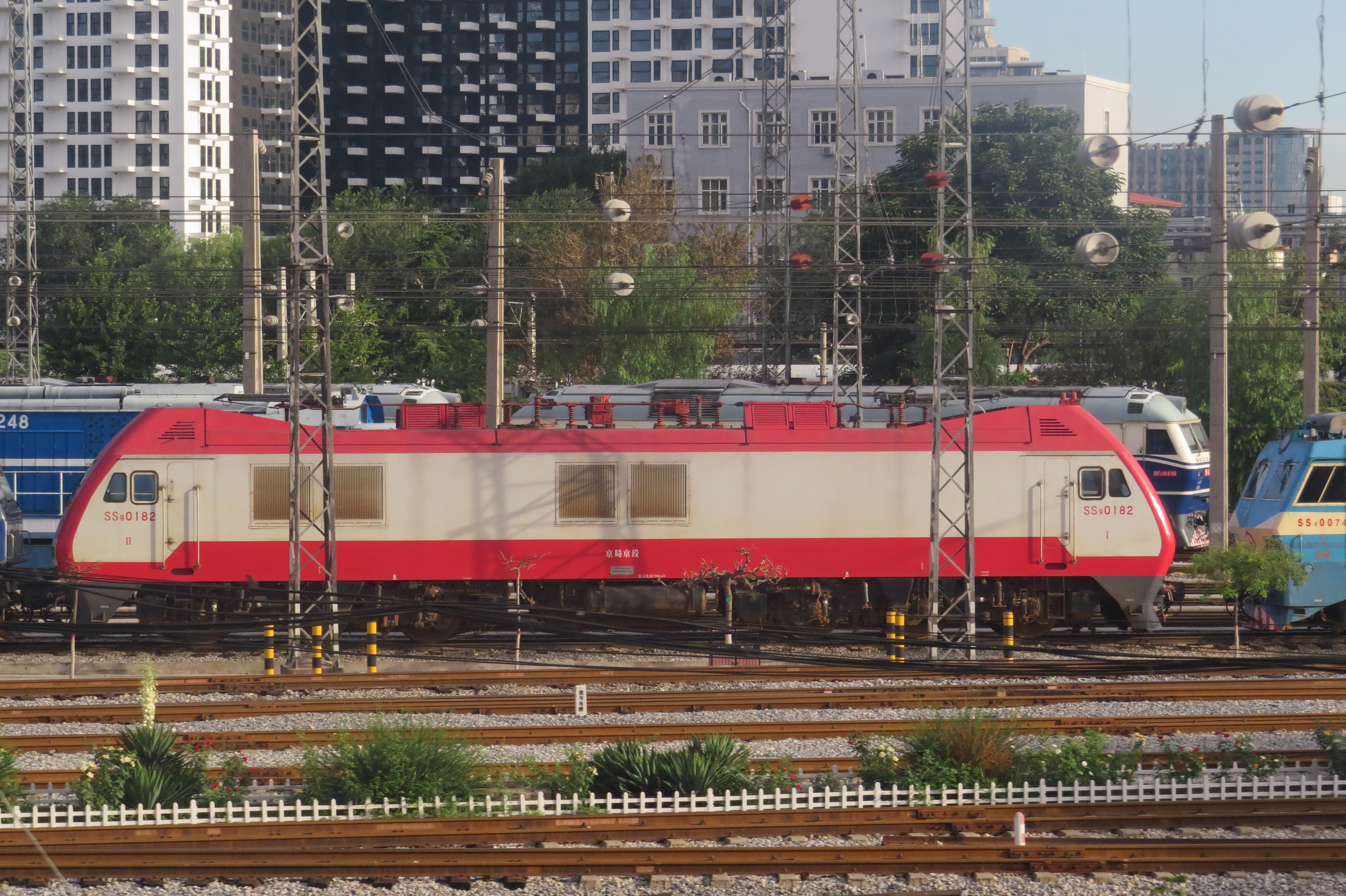
SS9G-0182, the locomotive hauling T195 at the time of the collision, remained intact after the collision and was still in operation as of August 2016.

The city of Zibo sent out 130 ambulances to the site of the crash and activated 34 medical stations. Some 700 medical personnel were on site. CPC General-secretary, President Hu Jintao and Premier Wen Jiabao both released directives after the accident occurred, and sent Vice-Premier Zhang Dejiang to inspect rescue and investigation efforts. Wang Jun, as head of the State Administration of Work Safety was named head of the investigation committee. Liu Zhijun, the Railways Minister, alongside Shandong party secretary Jiang Yikang and Governor Jiang Daming were also on-site.

China's Guangming Daily blamed the crash on "holes in the management of the Jiaoji Railway", stating that it is "highly unlikely" that two accidents can occur on the same railway three to four months apart. The Financial Times remarked that although the accident would be blamed on human error, it was likely that funding shortfalls played a role.

On May 26, 2009, the State Council issued the investigative report on the collision. A total of 37 people were found to be partly responsible for the accident. The executive vice-director of the Jinan Railway Bureau and six others were subject to criminal charges, and 31 other related personnel were accorded some sort of disciplinary action. Of these, Chen Gongxing, manager of the Jinan Railway Bureau, was dismissed; Chai Tiemin, the party chief of the Bureau, was also sacked.

== See also ==
- Lists of rail accidents
