= Huangtai–Jinan East link line =

Railway line in china

The Huangtai–Jinan East link line (Chinese: 黄东联络线) is a railway line in Jinan, Shandong, China. It is 10.5 km in length.

== History ==
Construction began in March 2020. The line opened on 16 November 2022.

== Route ==
The eastern terminus of the line is Jinan East railway station. It heads south and joins the Qingdao–Jinan railway east of Huangtai railway station. The line allows train services to call at both Jinan railway station and Jinan East. It has a maximum speed of 120 kilometres per hour (75 mph).
