= Qingdao–Jinan through train =

Railway service in Shandong, China

The Qingdao–Jinan through train (Chinese: 青岛到济南动车组列车) is a Chinese railway running between the capital Qingdao to Jinan express passenger trains by the Jinan Railway Bureau, Jinan passenger segment responsible for passenger transport task, Jinan originating on the Qingdao train. CRH5 Type Passenger trains running along the Qingdao–Jinan High-Speed Railway across Shandong provinces, the entire 363 km.

== Train trips ==
- D6001: Jinan - Qingdao
- D6002: Qingdao - Jinan
- D6003: Jinan West - Qingdao
- D6004: Qingdao - Jinan
- D6005: Jinan - Qingdao
- D6006: Qingdao - Jinan
- D6007: Jinan - Qingdao North
- D6008: Qingdao - Jinan
- D6009: Jinan - Qingdao
- D6010: Qingdao - Jinan
- D6011: Jinan - Qingdao
- D6012: Qingdao - Jinan
- D6013: Jinan - Qingdao
- D6014: Qingdao North - Jinan
- D6015: Jinan - Qingdao
- D6016: Qingdao - Jinan West
- D6017: Jinan - Qingdao
- D6018: Qingdao - Jinan West
- D6019: Jinan - Qingdao North

== See also ==
- Qingdao–Jinan high-speed railway – a faster parallel high-speed railway
- Qingdao–Jinan passenger railway
- Qingdao–Jinan Railway – the older "conventional" railway running along the Jiaoji passenger railway
