= Huangtai railway station =

Railway station in Jinan, Shandong, China

Coordinates: 36.68815°N 117.04637°E

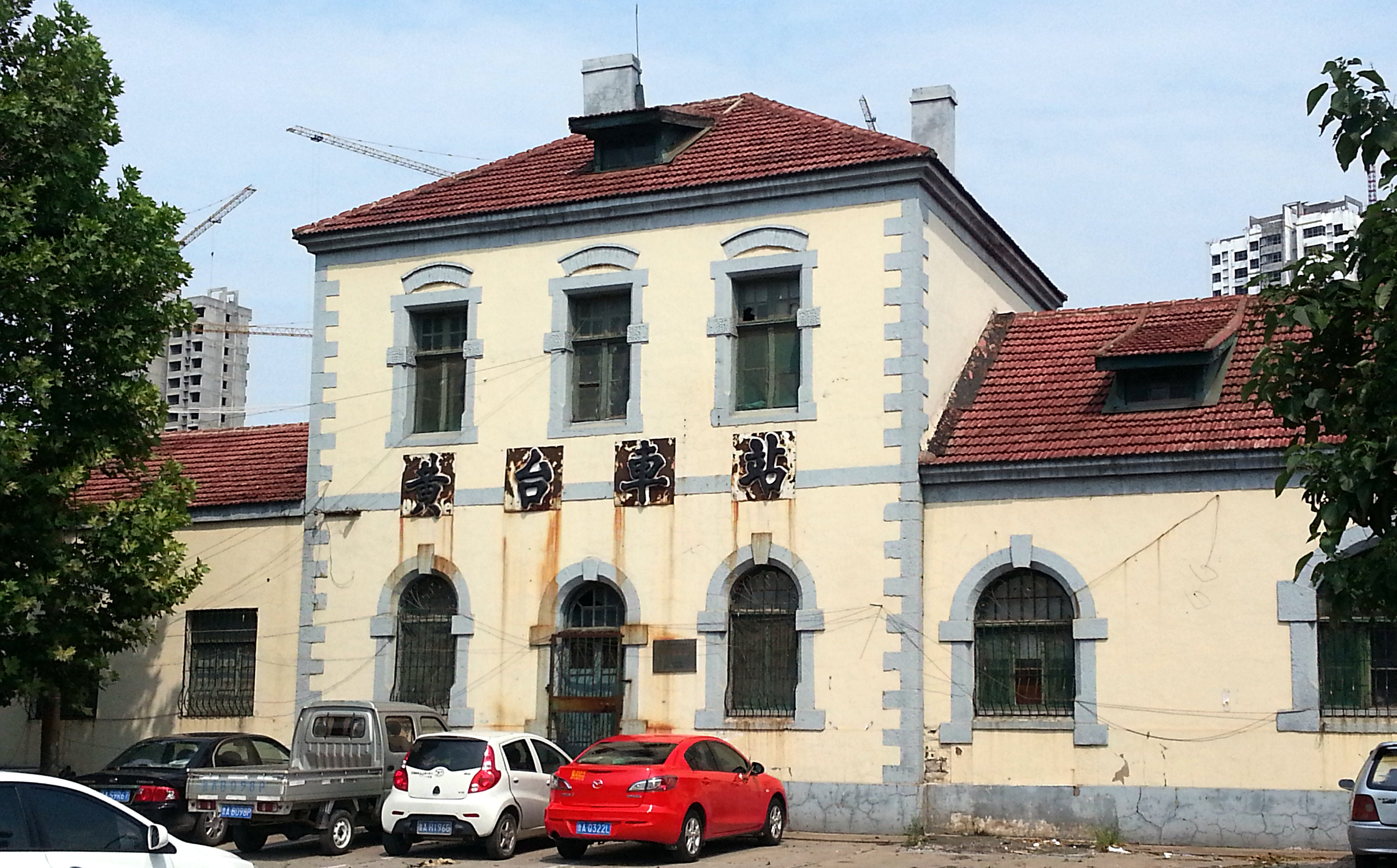
Huangtai railway station in August 2013.

Huangtai railway station (Chinese: 黄台站; pinyin: Huángtái zhàn) is a railway station in Licheng District, Jinan, Shandong, China. The station is on the Huangtai–Jinan East link line.

== History ==
The station was established in 1904 and the station building was erected in 1905 as part of the German Shandong Railway ("Schantung Eisenbahn"). The station was originally known as "Jinanfu East" ("Tsinanfu-Ost").

Huangtai railway station has been placed on the list of Major historical and cultural sites protected by Shandong Province in 2006 (site number 3-252).

== Location ==
Huangtai railway station is located on Huangtai South Road, on the northern end of Shanda Road and to the south of the Xiaoqing River. The postal address of Huangtai railway station is No.21, Huangtai South Road (黄台南路21号).

== See also ==
- List of sites in Jinan
- Major historical and cultural sites protected by Shandong Province
