= Putai =

Putai may refer to:

- Budai, a venerated Buddhist monk also romanized Pu-tai
- Binzhou, a Chinese city formerly known as Putai
  - Putai County, a Chinese county now part of Boxing County
