= Haitian =

Haitian may refer to:

== Relating to Haiti ==
- Haitian, an adjective referring to something of, from, or related to Haiti
  - Haitian Creole, a French-based Creole
  - Haitian French, variant of the French language
  - Haitians, an ethnic group
- Haitian art
- Haitian Carnival
- Haitian cuisine, traditional foods
- Haitian gourde, a unit of currency
- Haitian music
- Haitian patty, in culinary contexts
- Haitian literature
- Haitian mythology
- Haitian Revolution
- Haitian Vodou
- Ligue Haïtienne (Haitian League)

== Other uses ==
- Foshan Haitian Flavouring & Food Co, a Chinese company doing business as Haitian
- Haitian (Heroes), minor character in the 2006 television series Heroes

== See also ==
- Haitian−Qingdao railway, a railway in Shandong Province, China
