= Zibo–Dongying railway =

Railway line

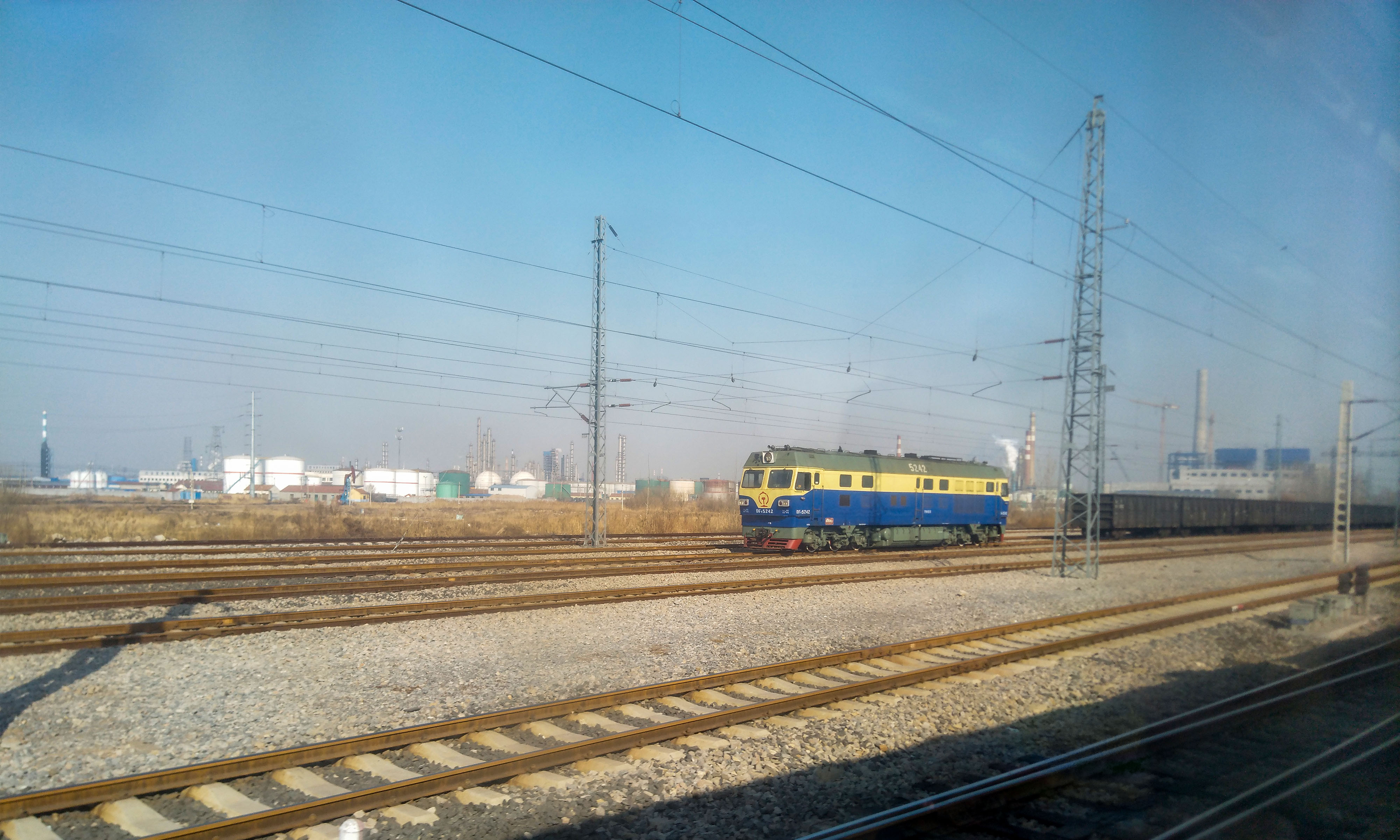

Overview
- Native name: 淄东铁路
- Status: Operational
- Locale: People's Republic of China
- Termini: Zibo; Dongying
- Stations: 3 (passenger)

Service
- Type: Heavy rail
- System: China Railway
- Operator(s): China Railway

History
- Opened: 1972

Technical
- Line length: 91 km (57 mi)
- Track gauge: 1,435 mm (4 ft 8 1/2 in) standard gauge
- Electrification: 50 Hz 25,0000V

The Zibo–Dongying railway or Zidong railway (simplified Chinese: 淄东铁路; traditional Chinese: 淄東鐵路; pinyin: zīdōng tiělù), also called the Zhangdian–Dongying railway or Zhangdong railway, is a railroad in Shandong Province of northern China, between Zibo and Dongying. The railway has a total length of 91 kilometres (57 mi). and was completed in 1972. The line branches off of the Jiaozhou–Jinan railway at the Zhangdian station near Zibo. Major cities and towns along route include Zibo, Boxing County, and Dongying.

== History ==
From Apr 14th 2016, Zidong railway began upgrading with total investment of 1.1 Billion RMB, and the scheduled completion date is the end of 2017. After this upgrade, the rail speed limit of Zidong railway will upgrade from less than 50 km/h to 120 km/h. Dongying will be fully connected with Qingdao–Jinan railway within 1 hour, and travel time between Dongying and Jinan will be shortened from 3.5h to 2h.

The electrified railway reopened on 30 September 2018.

== Rail Connections ==
- Zibo: Jiaozhou–Jinan railway

== See also ==
- List of railways in China
