= Haitian−Qingdao railway =

Railway line in China

Haitian−Qingdao railway 海青铁路

Overview
- Status: Operating
- Locale: Shandong Province, China
- Termini: Haitian; Zhilanzhuang
- Stations: 1 (passenger)

History
- Opened: 31 December 2013

Technical
- Line length: 91.7 km (57 mi)
- Track gauge: 1,435 mm (4 ft 8 1/2 in)
- Operating speed: 160 km/h (99 mph)

The Haitian−Qingdao railway or Haiqing railway (simplified Chinese: 海青铁路; traditional Chinese: 海青鐵路; pinyin: Hǎiqīng Tiělù) is a railway in Shandong Province, China. The single-track railway connects Haitian Station in Changyi on the Dezhou–Longkou–Yantai railway in northern Shandong with Zhilanzhuang Station in Gaomi on the Jiaozhou–Jinan railway near the Jiaozhou Bay in southern Shandong.

== History ==
The railway had been expected to open by the end of 2012. However, it was delayed and was opened to freight on 31 December 2013. Passenger services were introduced to Pingdu West on 1 July 2015.

== Passenger services ==
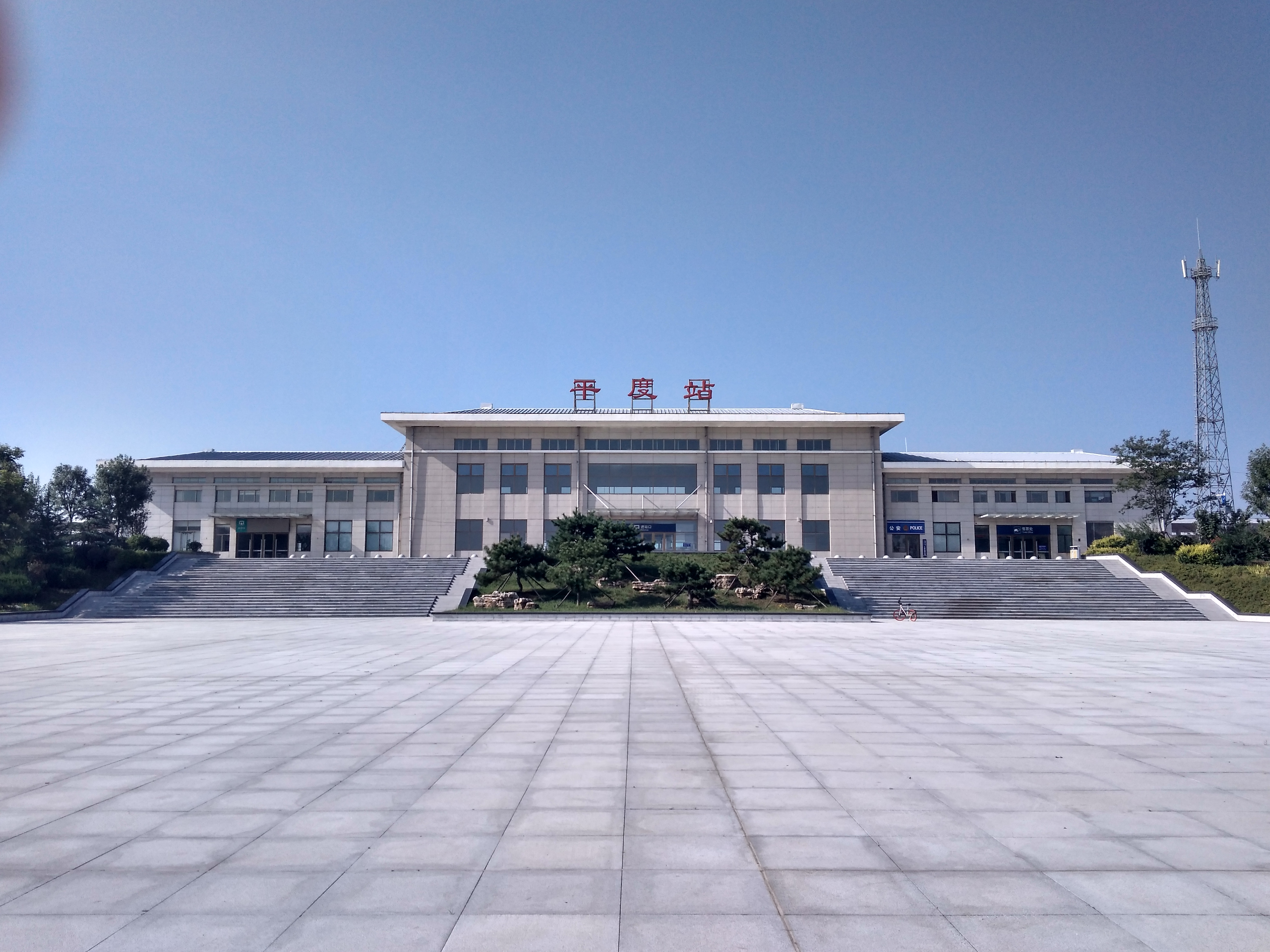
Pingdu West railway station

The line has a single passenger station, Pingdu West railway station. There are two services to and from Pingdu West per day. One terminates at Qingdao North while the other continues to Qingdao.

A new station, Pingdu railway station, on the Weifang–Laixi high-speed railway opened in November 2020 and is situated closer to the city.

== See also ==
- List of railways in China
- Rail transport in the People's Republic of China
