= Sifang railway station =

Railway station in Qingdao, Shandong, China

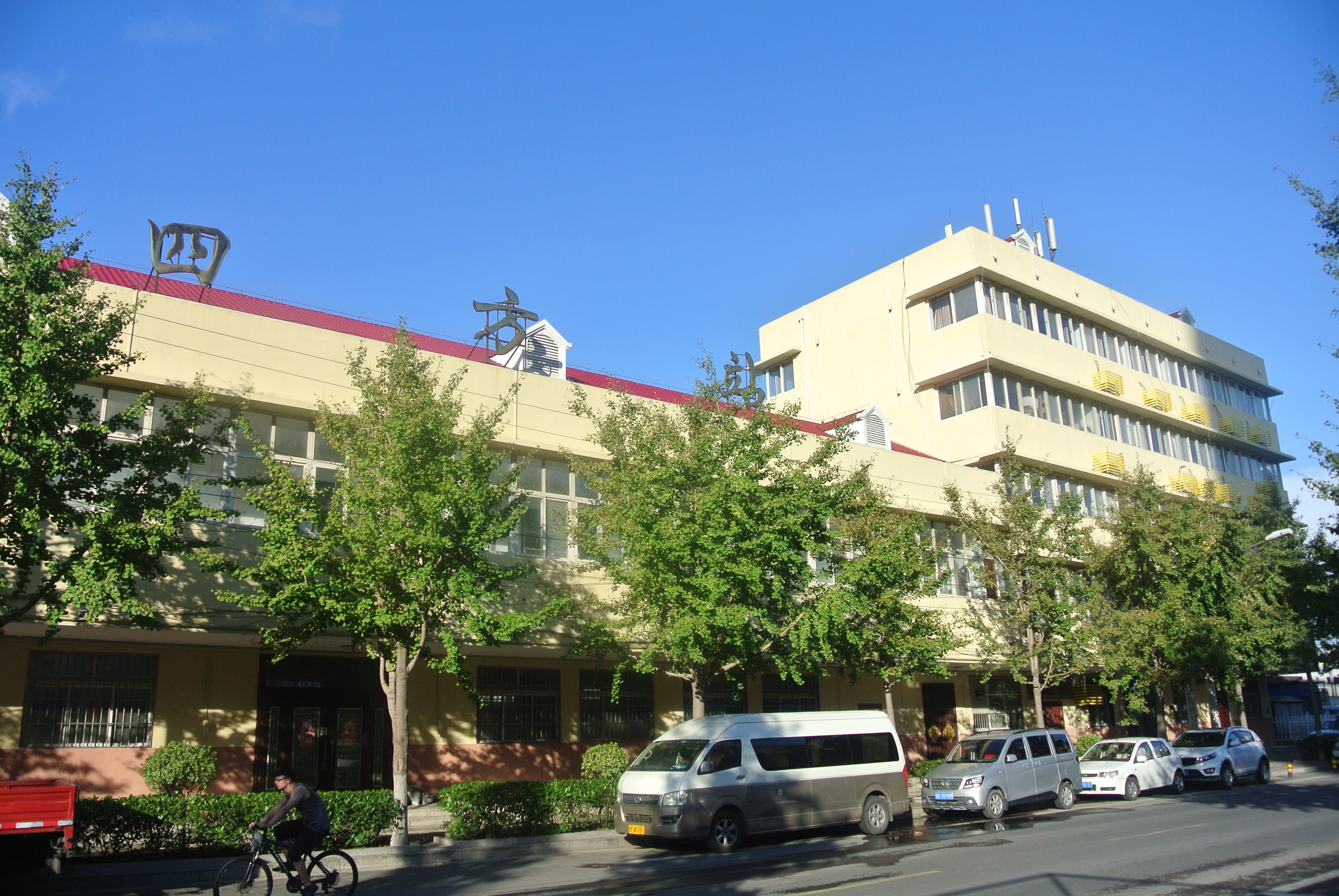
Qingdao Sifang Railway Station Building

Sifang railway station (Chinese: 四方火车站) is a railway station in Qingdao, Shandong, in the People's Republic of China.

== History ==
Until 2008, because the larger Qingdao railway station was undergoing renovations, the railway station in Qingdao's Sifang District served as Qingdao's primary railway station. From 27 July 2008, Sifang railway station stopped handling passenger services.
