= Jinan Railway Station North station =

Metro station in Jinan, China

Jinan Railway Station North 济南站北
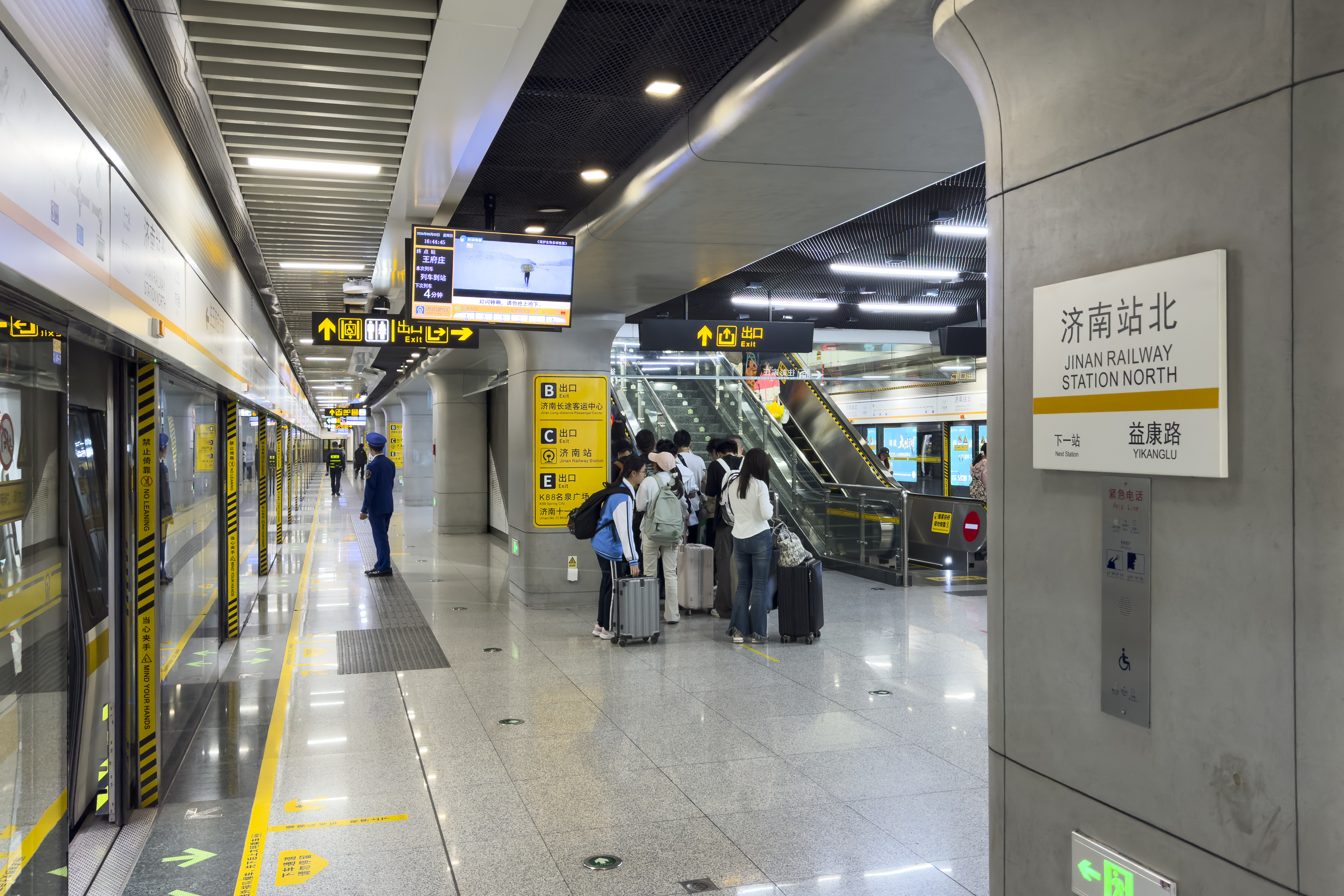
- Platform

Chinese name
- Simplified Chinese: 济南站北站
- Traditional Chinese: 濟南站北站
Transcriptions
Standard Mandarin
- Hanyu Pinyin: Jǐnánzhàn Běi Zhàn

General information
- Location: Dikou Road (堤口路) × Tongpu Street (通普街) & Wuyingshan East Road (无影山东路); Tianqiao District, Jinan, Shandong; China
- Coordinates: 36°40′36.6″N 116°58′49.3″E
- System: Jinan Metro
- Line: Line 2
- Platforms: 2 (1 island platform)
- Tracks: 2
- Connections: Jinan

Construction
- Structure type: Underground
- Accessible: Yes

History
- Opened: 26 March 2021
- Former names: Jinan Railway Station Bei

Services
Preceding station	Jinan Metro	Following station
Yikanglu towards Wangfuzhuang	Line 2	Jiluolu towards Pengjiazhuang
Location

Jinan Railway Station North (Chinese: 济南站北), formerly known as Jinan Railway Station Bei, is an underground metro station on Line 2 of Jinan Metro. It was opened in 26 March 2021, together with the rest of the stations on Line 2.

== Structure ==
Jinan Railway Station North has two levels: a concourse, and an island platform with two tracks for line 2.

=== Entrances/exits ===
The stations has four entrances. Plus, there is a passage on basement 1 leading to Jinan railway station, which features five entrances. This passage opened on 26 September 2025.

Metro concourse

- B: Dikou Road (North), Wuyingshan East Road, Tianqiao District People's Government
- C: Dikou Road (South), Tongpu Street (East)
- D: Tongpu Street (West)
- E: Dikou Road (South)

Pedestrian passageway

- 1: Tongpu Street (East), Guanshaying Back Street (官扎营后街)
- 2: Tongpu Street (East), Guanshaying Back Street
- 3: Tongpu Street (East), north square of Jinan railway station
- 4: Tongpu Street (West), Baohua Street (宝华街)
- 5: Tongpu Street (West)

== Gallery ==
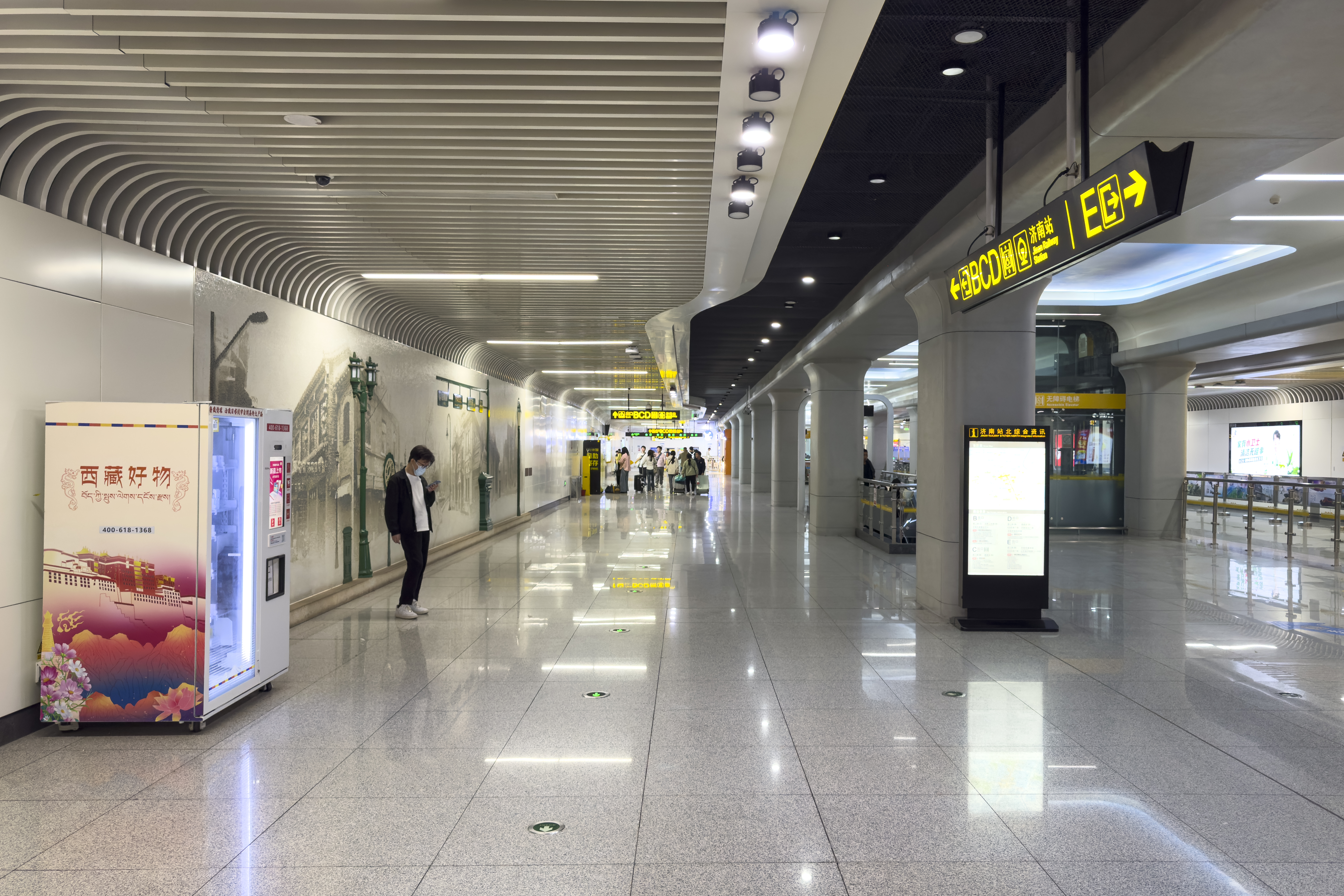
Concourse

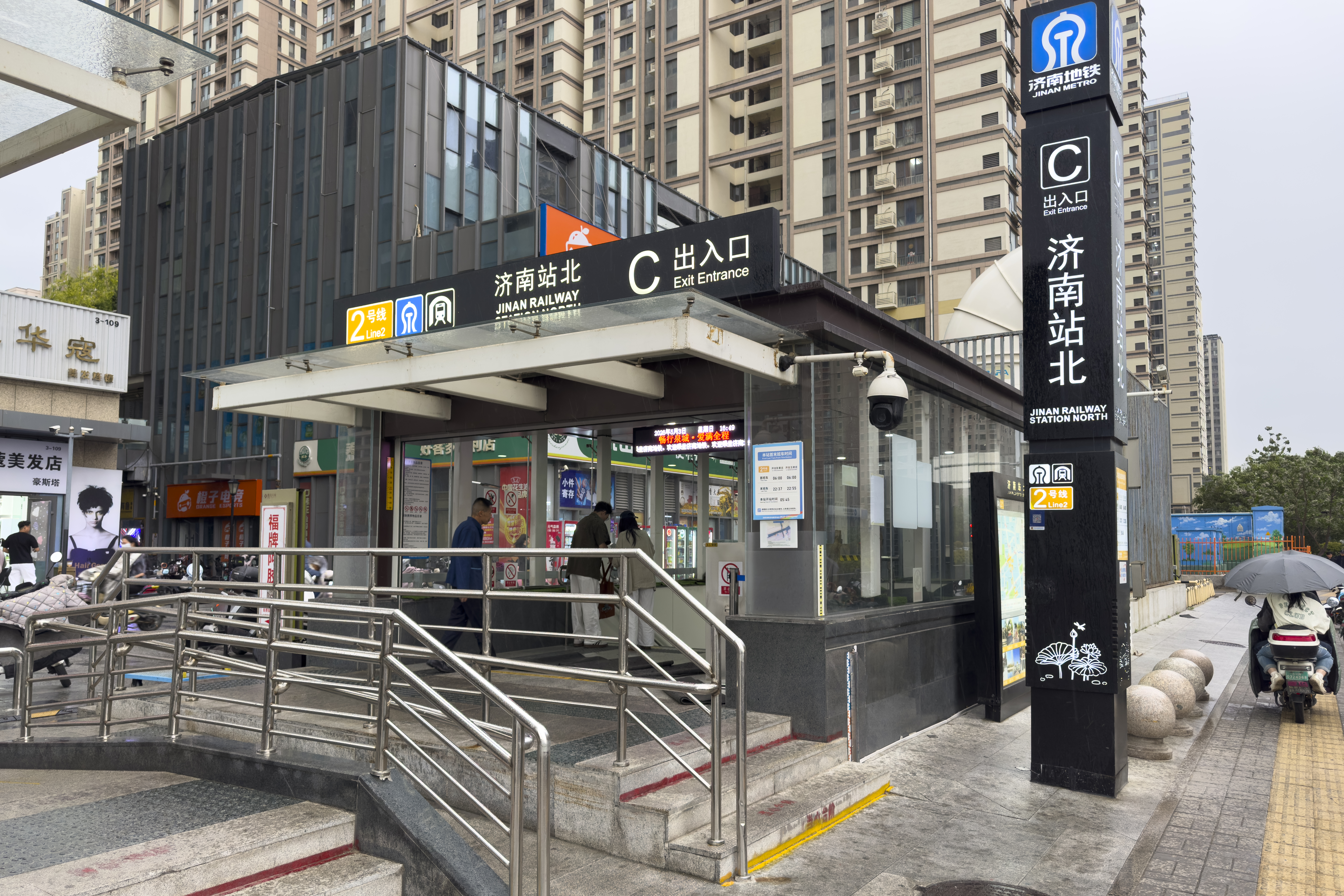
Entrance C

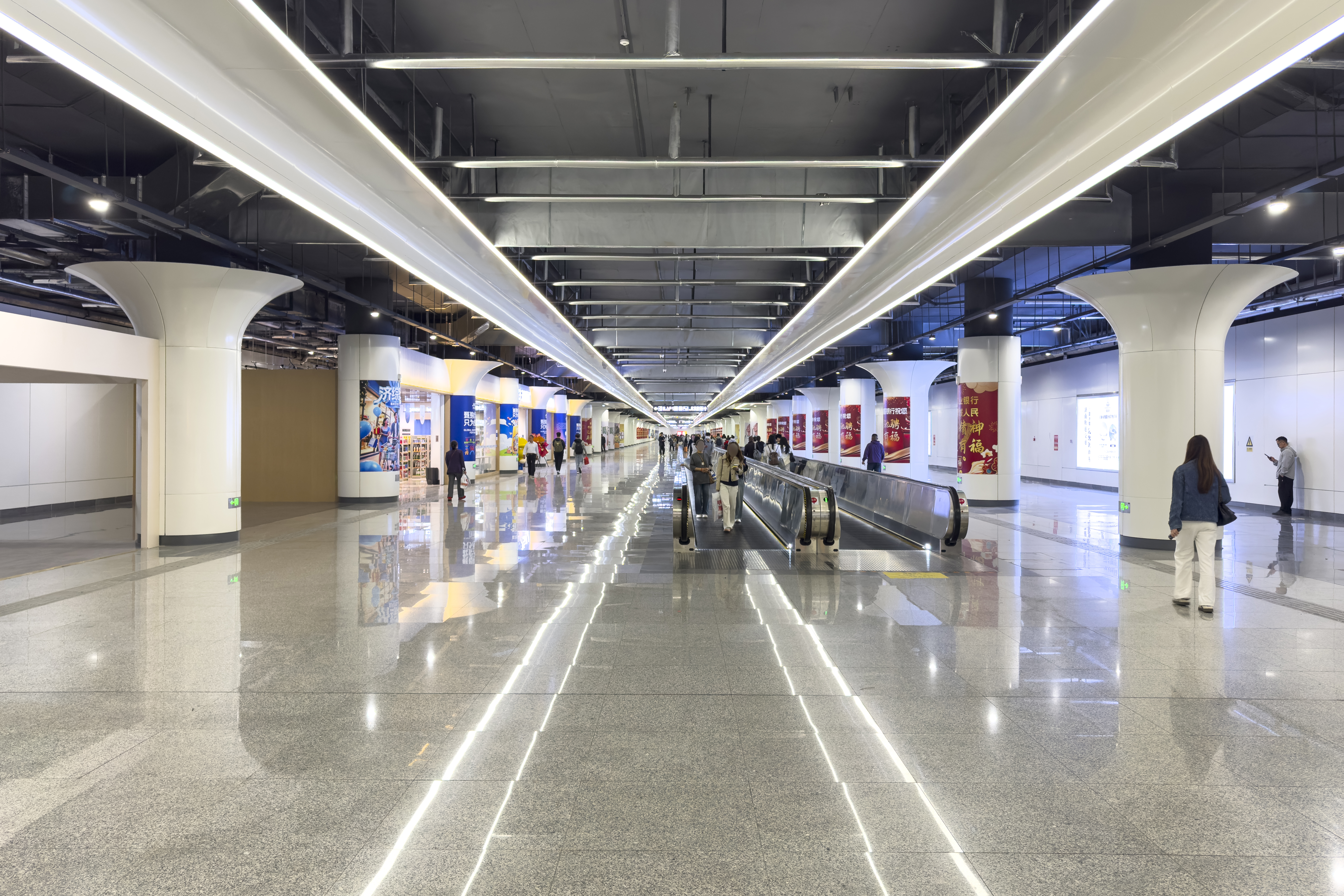
Passageway for Jinan railway station
