= Boxing County =

Boxing County 博兴县
- County
- Location of the seat in Shandong
- Coordinates: 37°09′16″N 118°06′39″E
- Country: People's Republic of China
- Province: Shandong
- Prefecture-level city: Binzhou
- Established date: 923 AD (est.)

Government
  - County Party Secretary: Jiao Benqiang (焦本强)
  - County Mayor: Yin Meiying (殷梅英)
  - County Congress Chairman: Jiao Benqiang (焦本强)

Area
  - County: 900 km^{2} (350 sq mi)
- Elevation: 8 m (26 ft)

Population (2019)
  - County: 504,900
  - Density: 560/km^{2} (1,500/sq mi)
- Time zone: UTC+8 (China Standard)
- Postal code: 256500
- Area code: 0543
- GDP: 2015
- Total: CNY 31.5 billion $ 4.56 billion
- Per capita: CNY 65,000 /$ 9,400
- Growth: ▲
- License plate prefixes: 鲁M
- Website: www.boxing.gov.cn

Boxing County
- Traditional Chinese: 博興縣
- Simplified Chinese: 博兴县
- Literal meaning: Amply Rising County
Transcriptions
Standard Mandarin
- Hanyu Pinyin: Bóxīng Xiàn
- Wade–Giles: Po-hsing Hsien

Former names
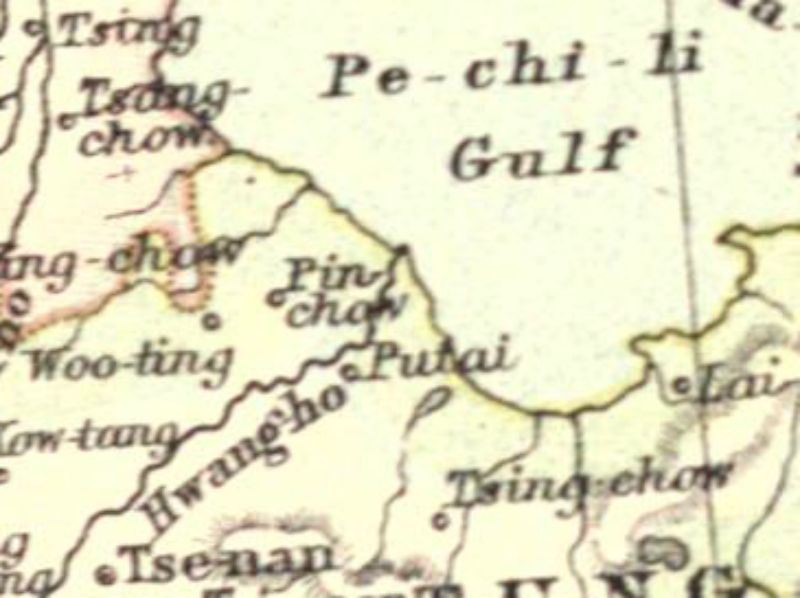
- Putai at the head of the Yellow River in 1878
- Traditional Chinese: 蒲台縣
- Simplified Chinese: 蒲台县
- Literal meaning: Bullrush Terrace County
Transcriptions
Standard Mandarin
- Hanyu Pinyin: Pútái Xiàn
- Wade–Giles: P'u-t'ai Hsien

Boxing County is a county of Binzhou in Shandong Province in the People's Republic of China.

== History ==
The area of Boxing County was mostly created within the last few millennia and long remained sparsely populated owing to the destructive floods of the Yellow River.

In March 1956, Boxing absorbed most of the former Putai County, although Putai itself now forms the Pucheng area of Binzhou. Putai County had been established in 596. (Note: Given in Chinese sources as the 16th year of the Kaihuang Era of the Sui Dynasty.)

== Administrative divisions ==
As of 2012, this county is divided to 3 subdistricts and 9 towns.

Subdistricts

- Chengdong Subdistrict (城东街道)
- Jinqiu Subdistrict (锦秋街道)
- Bochang Subdistrict (博昌街道)

Towns

- Caowang (曹王镇)
- Xingfu (兴福镇)
- Chenhu (陈户镇)
- Hubin (湖滨镇)
- Dianzi (店子镇)
- Lüyi (吕艺镇)
- Chunhua (纯化镇)
- Pangjia (庞家镇)
- Qiaozhuang (乔庄镇)

== Climate ==
Climate data for Boxing, elevation 9 m (30 ft), (1991–2020 normals, extremes 1991–present)
Month	Jan	Feb	Mar	Apr	May	Jun	Jul	Aug	Sep	Oct	Nov	Dec	Year
Record high °C (°F)	20.7 (69.3)	23.8 (74.8)	31.9 (89.4)	35.0 (95.0)	40.0 (104.0)	41.8 (107.2)	40.1 (104.2)	38.7 (101.7)	36.9 (98.4)	33.1 (91.6)	26.8 (80.2)	17.7 (63.9)	41.8 (107.2)
Mean daily maximum °C (°F)	3.8 (38.8)	7.6 (45.7)	14.2 (57.6)	21.3 (70.3)	27.0 (80.6)	31.5 (88.7)	32.4 (90.3)	30.9 (87.6)	27.5 (81.5)	21.2 (70.2)	12.8 (55.0)	5.6 (42.1)	19.7 (67.4)
Daily mean °C (°F)	−1.6 (29.1)	1.7 (35.1)	7.9 (46.2)	15.0 (59.0)	21.0 (69.8)	25.6 (78.1)	27.6 (81.7)	26.2 (79.2)	21.8 (71.2)	15.2 (59.4)	7.2 (45.0)	0.4 (32.7)	14.0 (57.2)
Mean daily minimum °C (°F)	−5.7 (21.7)	−2.9 (26.8)	2.7 (36.9)	9.3 (48.7)	15.3 (59.5)	20.2 (68.4)	23.3 (73.9)	22.3 (72.1)	17.1 (62.8)	10.3 (50.5)	2.8 (37.0)	−3.5 (25.7)	9.3 (48.7)
Record low °C (°F)	−18.6 (−1.5)	−12.5 (9.5)	−7.8 (18.0)	−1.5 (29.3)	4.8 (40.6)	10.8 (51.4)	16.3 (61.3)	14.0 (57.2)	6.9 (44.4)	−1.5 (29.3)	−10.3 (13.5)	−14.2 (6.4)	−18.6 (−1.5)
Average precipitation mm (inches)	5.4 (0.21)	10.3 (0.41)	9.9 (0.39)	26.3 (1.04)	52.1 (2.05)	91.1 (3.59)	155 (6.1)	151.2 (5.95)	43.7 (1.72)	26.8 (1.06)	23.0 (0.91)	6.6 (0.26)	601.4 (23.69)
Average precipitation days (≥ 0.1 mm)	2.3	2.9	3.1	5.0	6.5	8.1	10.7	10.2	6.0	5.4	4.1	3.0	67.3
Average snowy days	2.9	2.3	1.1	0.2	0	0	0	0	0	0	0.6	2.2	9.3
Average relative humidity (%)	59	56	51	53	57	60	73	78	69	64	63	62	62
Mean monthly sunshine hours	155.4	156.3	201.1	229.0	258.8	227.3	191.2	195.4	194.8	191.6	159.0	151.9	2,311.8
Percentage possible sunshine	50	51	54	58	59	52	43	47	53	56	53	51	52
Source: China Meteorological Administration

== Transportation ==
- Zibo–Dongying Railway
