= Qingdao–Jinan passenger railway =

Railway line in Shandong, China

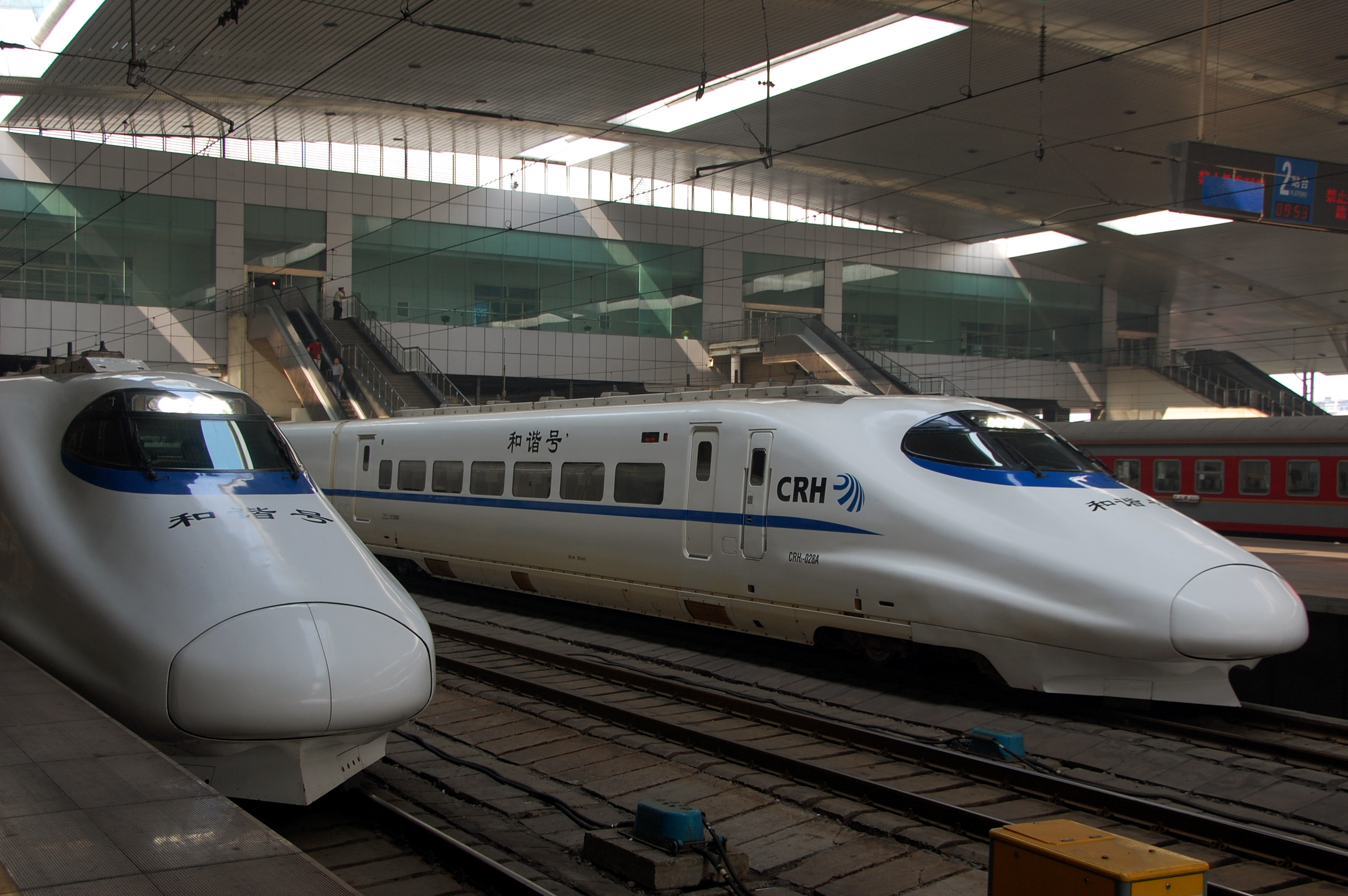

Overview
- Other name(s): Jiaoji passenger railway
- Native name: 胶济客运专线 胶济四线 胶济客专 胶济铁路客运专线
- Owner: CR Jinan
- Locale: Shandong province: Qingdao, Weifang, Zibo, Jinan
- Stations: 14

Service
- Type: High-speed rail
- System: China Railway High-speed
- Operator(s): CR Jinan

Technical
- Line length: Qingdao—Jinan: 362.5 km (225.2 mi)
- Number of tracks: 2 (Double-track)
- Track gauge: 1,435 mm (4 ft 8 1/2 in) standard gauge
- Electrification: 25 kV 50 Hz AC (Overhead line)
- Operating speed: 250 km/h (160 mph) (maximum)

The Qingdao–Jinan passenger railway, or Jiaoji passenger railway (simplified Chinese: 胶济客运专线; traditional Chinese: 膠濟客運專線; pinyin: Jiāo-Jǐ Kèyùn Zhuān Xiàn), is a high-speed railway operated by China Railway Jinan Group in Shandong province, running from Jinan to Qingdao at 250 km/h (160 mph) following the Qingdao–Jinan Railway. "Jiāo" in its short name is a reference to the Jiaozhou Bay region, where Qingdao is located; "Jǐ" refers to Jinan. The line opened in 2008, with the goal to further separate passenger and freight services on the congested Qingdao–Jinan Railway and provide extra capacity.

Connecting at Jinan with the Beijing–Shanghai high-speed railway, the Qingdao–Jinan line offers direct high-speed (G- and D-series) train service from Qingdao to both Beijing South and Shanghai.

== See also ==
- Qingdao–Jinan Railway – the older "conventional" railway running along the Jiaoji passenger railway
- Qingdao–Jinan high-speed railway – a faster parallel high-speed railway
- Qingdao–Jinan through train
