= Jinan railway station =

Railway station in Jinan, China

Jinan 济南
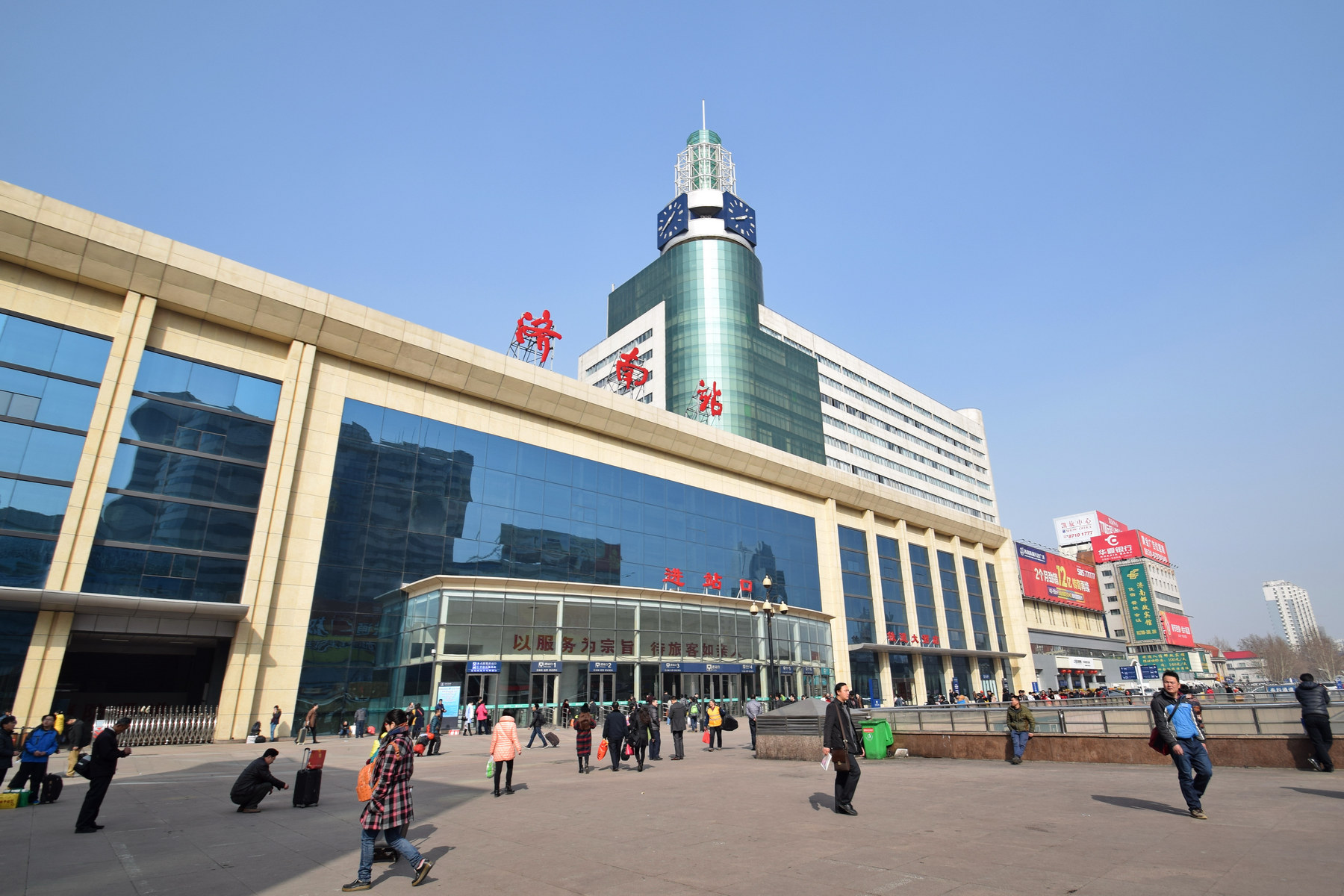
- Jinan railway station

General information
- Location: 19 Chezhan Street (车站街); Tianqiao District, Jinan, Shandong; China
- Coordinates: 36°40′13″N 116°59′7″E
- Operated by: CR Jinan; China Railway Corporation
- Lines: Beijing–Shanghai Railway; Qingdao–Jinan Railway; Qingdao–Jinan Passenger Railway
- Platforms: 4
- Connections: Jinan Railway Station North

Other information
- Station code: Telegraph code: JNK; Pinyin code: JNA
- Classification: Top Class station

Key dates
- 1904: Construction started
- 1912: Opened (Jinpu Railway)
- 1915: Opened (Jiaoji Railway)
- 1937: Closed (Jiaoji Railway)
- 1992: Rebuilt
Location

Jinan railway station (Chinese: 济南站) is a railway station in Jinan, Shandong, China. It is on both the Beijing-Shanghai Railway and Qingdao-Jinan Passenger Railway. It accommodates intercity High Speed services towards destinations as Qingdao, Qingdao North, Yantai, Weihai, Rongcheng and Longkou.

== Old Jinan stations ==
The predecessor of the current station was constructed in 1912. Serving the Jinpu Railway (Reorganised as part of Beijing-Shanghai Railway in 2007), it was designed by German architect Hermann Fischer. It was controversially demolished and rebuilt in 1992. Between 1915 and 1937, Jinan was home to another railway station of the same name, which served as the western terminus for the Jiaoji Railway, the station building of which is still extant and has since turned into a museum.

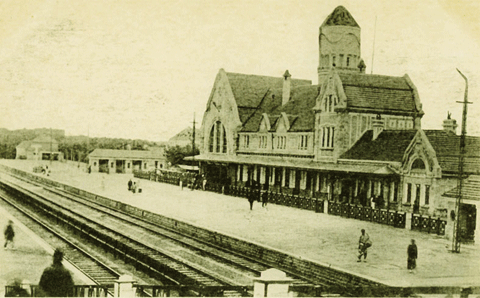
Former Jinan station (Jinpu railway) building

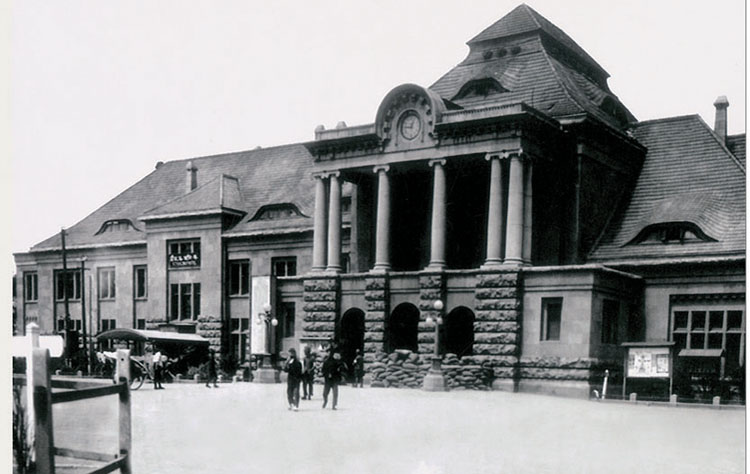
Former Jinan station (Jiaoji railway) building

== Future Development ==
It is planned to build a new station building to the north of the railway. Construction is expected to begin in January 2023.

== Metro station ==
The station is served by Jinan Railway Station North station on Line 2 of the Jinan Metro.

== See also ==
- Jinan North railway station
- Jinan West railway station
- Jinan East railway station
- Daminghu railway station (near Daming Lake)
- Rail transport in China
