= Qingdao–Jinan railway =

Railway line

Qingdao–Jinan railway 胶济铁路
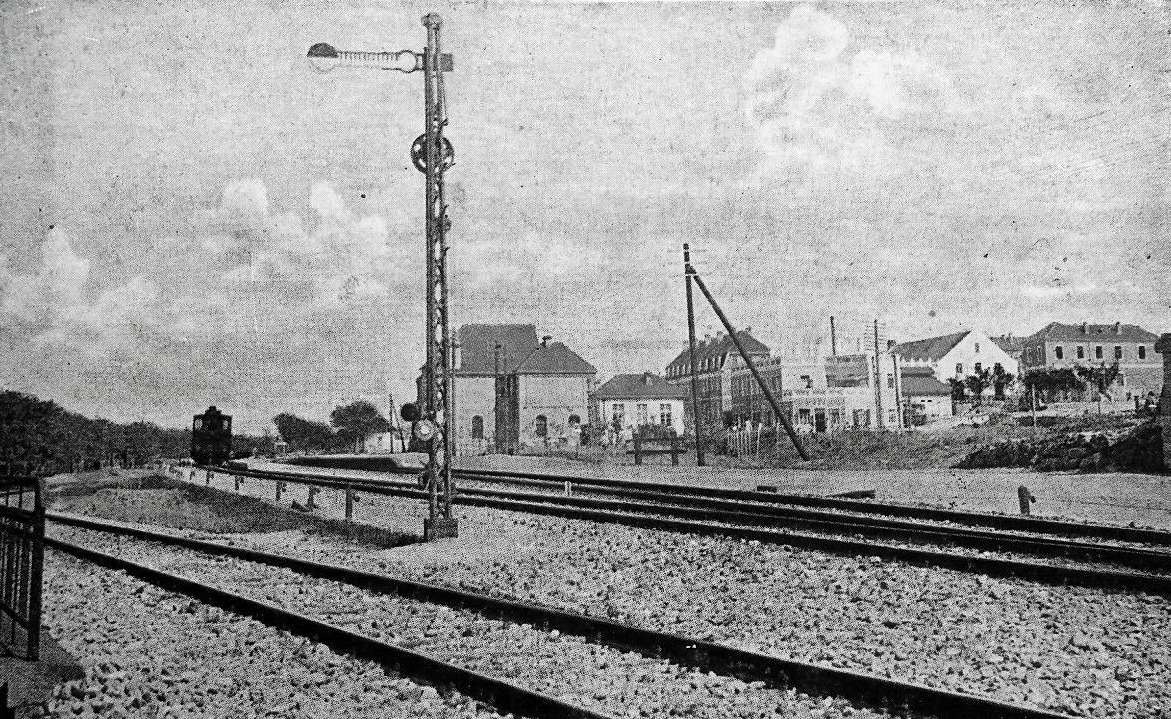
- Qingdao port area in the 1910s

Overview
- Status: Operational
- Locale: People's Republic of China
- Termini: Qingdao; Jinan
- Stations: 36

Service
- Type: Heavy rail
- System: China Railway
- Operator(s): China Railway

History
- Opened: 1904

Technical
- Line length: 384.2 km (238.7 mi)
- Track gauge: 1,435 mm (4 ft 8 1/2 in) standard gauge
- Electrification: 50 Hz 25 kV
- Operating speed: 200 km/h (124 mph)

The Qingdao–Jinan railway or Jiaoji Railway (simplified Chinese: 胶济铁路; traditional Chinese: 膠濟鐵路; pinyin: Jiāojì Tiělù, formerly the Shantung Railway) is a railway in Shandong Province, China. The railway is 393 kilometres (244 mi) in length and connects Qingdao, on the Jiaozhou Bay, and Jinan, the provincial capital of Shandong. Adolph von Hansemann and other German financiers funded construction of the railway, then known as Schantung Eisenbahn Gesellschaft (Shantung Railway Company), which began September 23, 1899, and was completed in 1904. Since the quadruple tracking of this corridor with the opening of the parallel Qingdao–Jinan passenger railway, the line is mostly used for freight with some conventional passenger services.

== Rail connections ==
- Jinan: Beijing–Shanghai railway, Handan–Jinan railway
- Zibo: Zibo–Dongying railway
- Yantai: Lancun–Yantai railway
- Jiaozhou: Jiaozhou–Xinyi railway, Haitian−Qingdao railway

== History ==
Steam locomotive 409 of the Shantung Railway, built by Kisha Seizō of Japan in 1922.

As the Qingdao–Jinan railway could be used to transport a large number of soldiers through the mountainous countryside of the Shandong Peninsula, it was of great military significance during the Warlord Era (1916–1928) and Nanjing decade (1928–1937) of China, as various warlords used it in their conflicts. In late 1932, the railway saw heavy fighting as warlord Han Fuju sought to capture its eastern section from his rival Liu Zhennian during a war for eastern Shandong. Liu's troops managed to beat off the attacks, forcing Han to resort to the region's road network (which was of bad quality at the time) to move his army, significantly prolonging the war. Nevertheless, Han eventually won, unifying all of Shandong under his rule.

It was originally opened by the German-owned Shantung Railway Company, and after the Germans were defeated in China by the Japanese during the First World War, it passed to Chinese control as the Jiaoji Railway Company. After the Japanese occupation of northern China during the Second Sino-Japanese War, the Jiaoji Railway was nationalised and made part of the North China Transportation Company. After the establishment of the People's Republic of China, the railway became part of China Railway.

Between 1959 and 1990, the railway was dualled. Electrification of the railway began in 2003 and was completed in September 2006.

== Incidents ==
- 2008 Shandong train collision

== Bibliography ==
- Jowett, Philip S. (2017). The Bitter Peace. Conflict in China 1928–37. Stroud: Amberley Publishing. ISBN 978-1445651927.

== See also ==
- Qingdao–Jinan high-speed railway – a new parallel dedicated high-speed railway running north of the Qingdao–Jinan railway.
- Qingdao–Jinan passenger railway – a new high-speed railway running alongside the Qingdao–Jinan railway.
- List of railways in China
- Rail transport in the People's Republic of China
