= Qingdao railway station =

Railway station in Qingdao, China

Qingdao 青岛
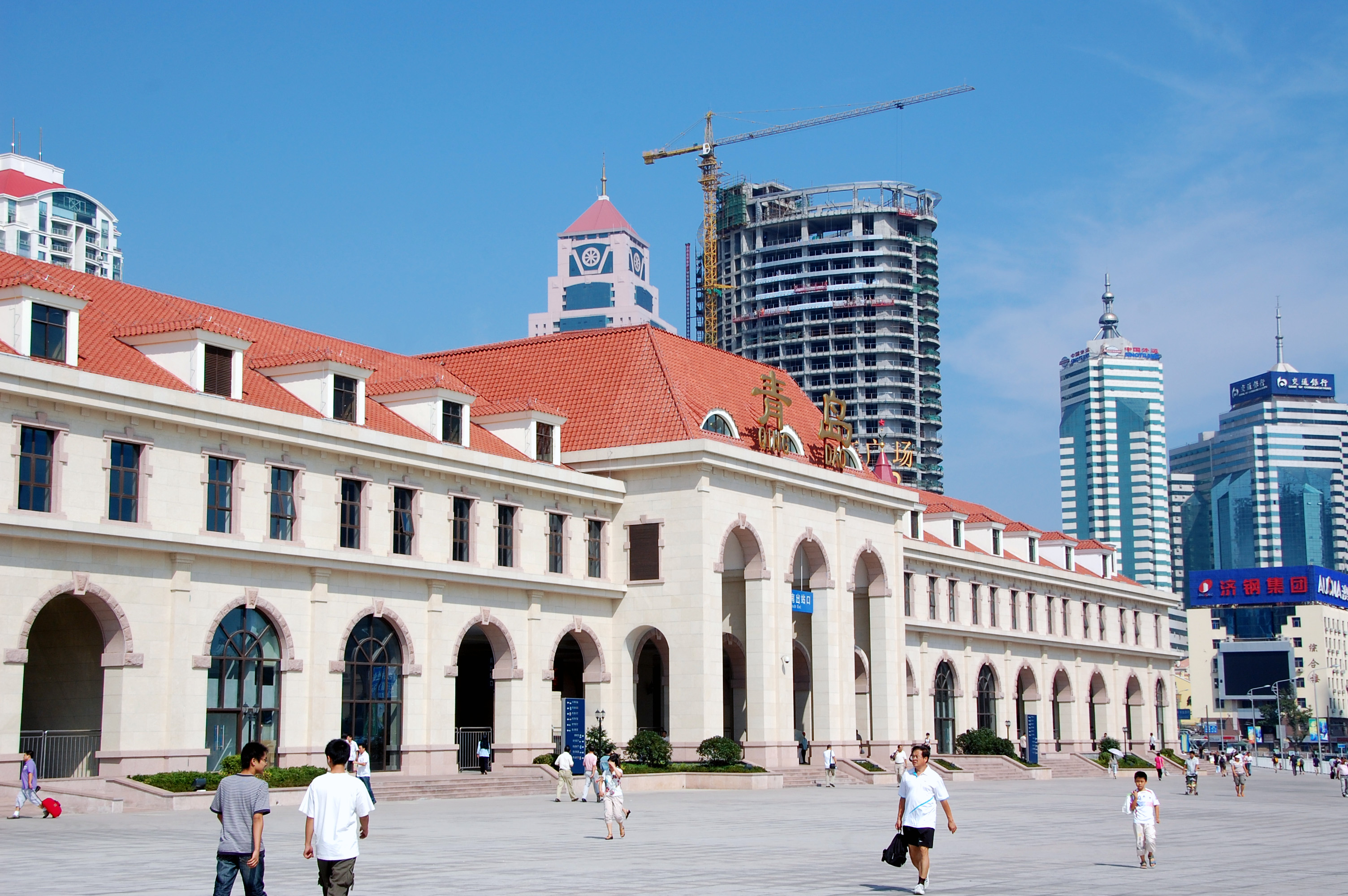
- Qingdao railway station

General information
- Location: Tai'an Lu, Shinan District, Qingdao, Shandong; China
- Coordinates: 36°3′51″N 120°18′27″E
- Operator: CR Jinan, China Railway Corporation
- Lines: Jiaozhou–Jinan Railway; Jiaozhou–Jinan High-Speed Railway
- Platforms: 6
- Connections: Bus terminal

Other information
- Station code: China Railway: TMIS code: 18089; Telegraph code: QDK; Pinyin code: QDA; Qingdao Metro: 115 (Line 1); 301 (Line 3)
- Classification: Top Class station

History
- Opened: 1901; 125 years ago; 2008; 18 years ago (reopened)
Location

Qingdao railway station (simplified Chinese: 青岛站; traditional Chinese: 青島站; pinyin: Qīngdǎo zhàn) is a railway station in Qingdao, Shandong, in the People's Republic of China.

As a time-honoured station of Qingdao, more than 100 regular passenger trains (denoted with letter Z/T/K, or no letter), initially scheduled CRH trains (denoted with letter G/D) and some intercity CRH trains (denoted with letter C) arrive and depart daily. Limited by a relatively small number of platforms, most newly scheduled trains eventually will not stop here, instead, terminating at the larger Qingdao North railway station. There are also trains that stop at both Qingdao North and Qingdao stations.

== History ==
The station first opened in 1901. In the years leading up to the 2008 Summer Olympics, the station underwent a significant renovation in order to accommodate increased passenger traffic for the Olympic period and afterwards. The new station is an example of German architectural traits incorporated into a Chinese-designed building, which is consistent with many structures in Qingdao.

On 28 October 2022, the station was closed to allow for renovation of the platform canopy. Passenger services are calling at Qingdao North railway station instead. The station is expected to reopen on 16 January 2023.

The building in different periods
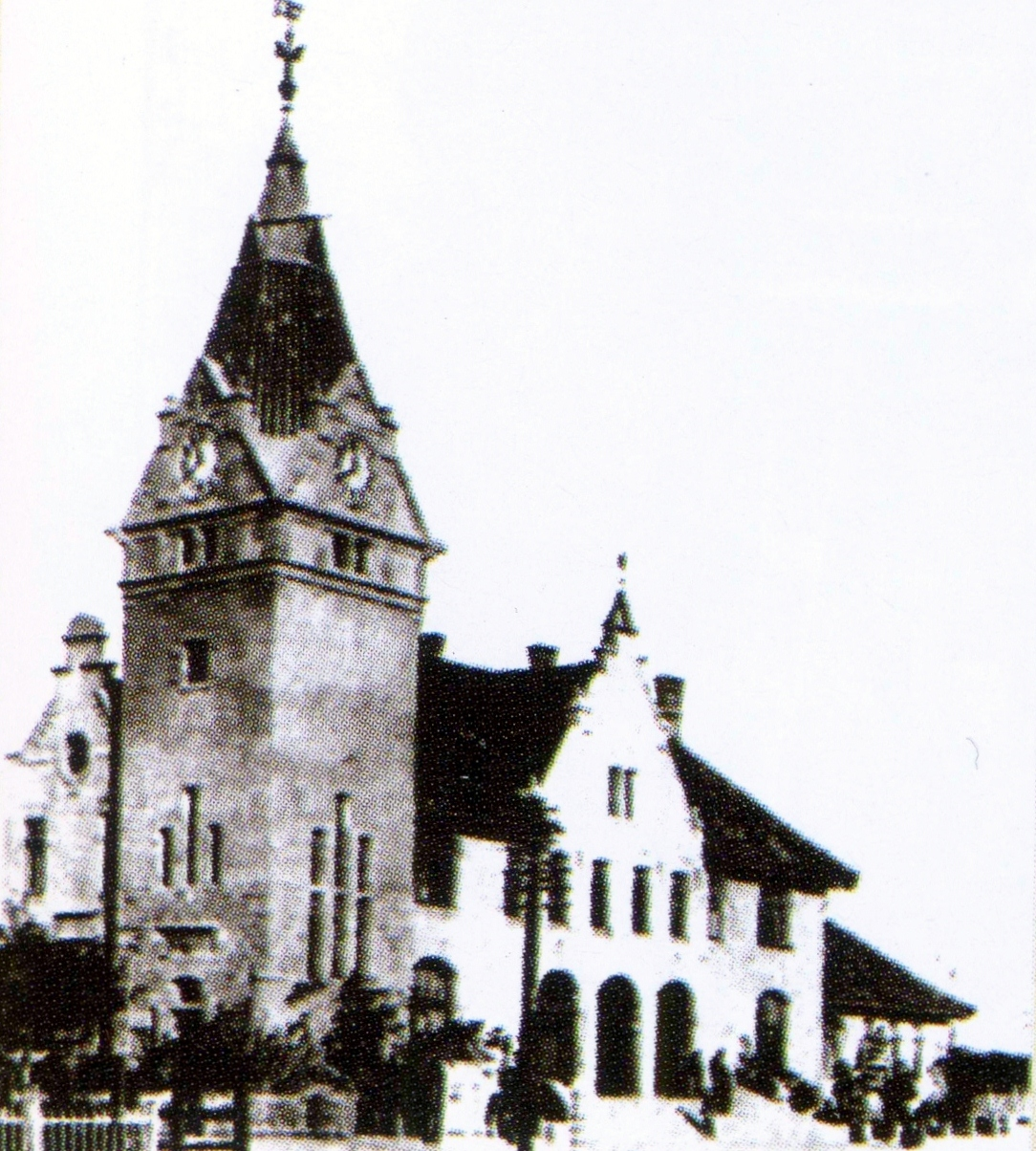
1901

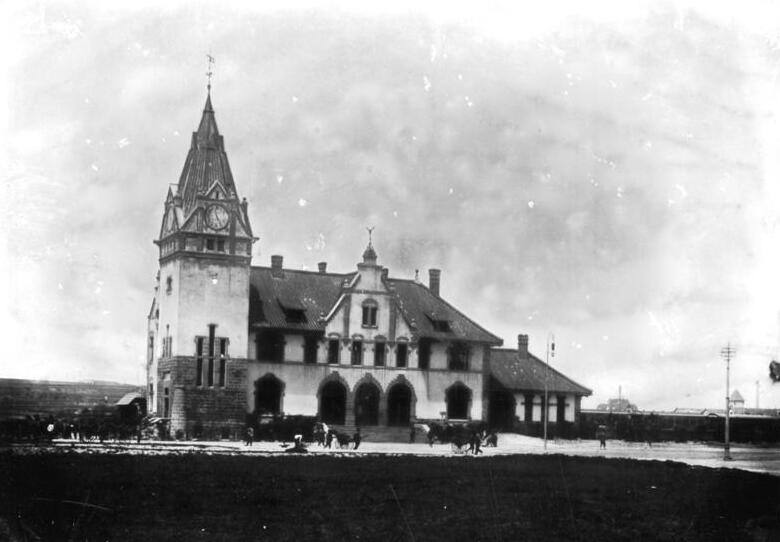
1900s

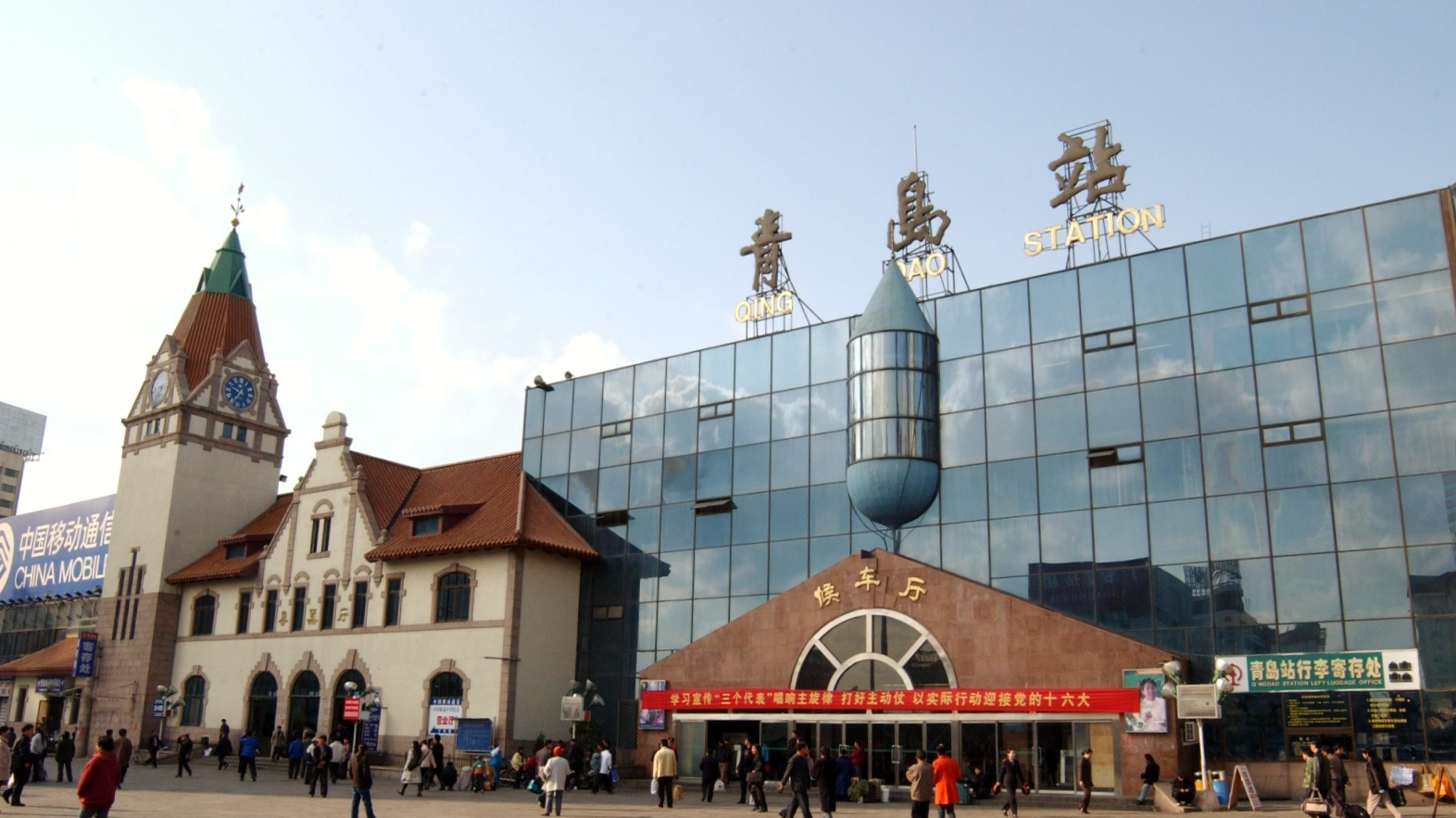
After 1991

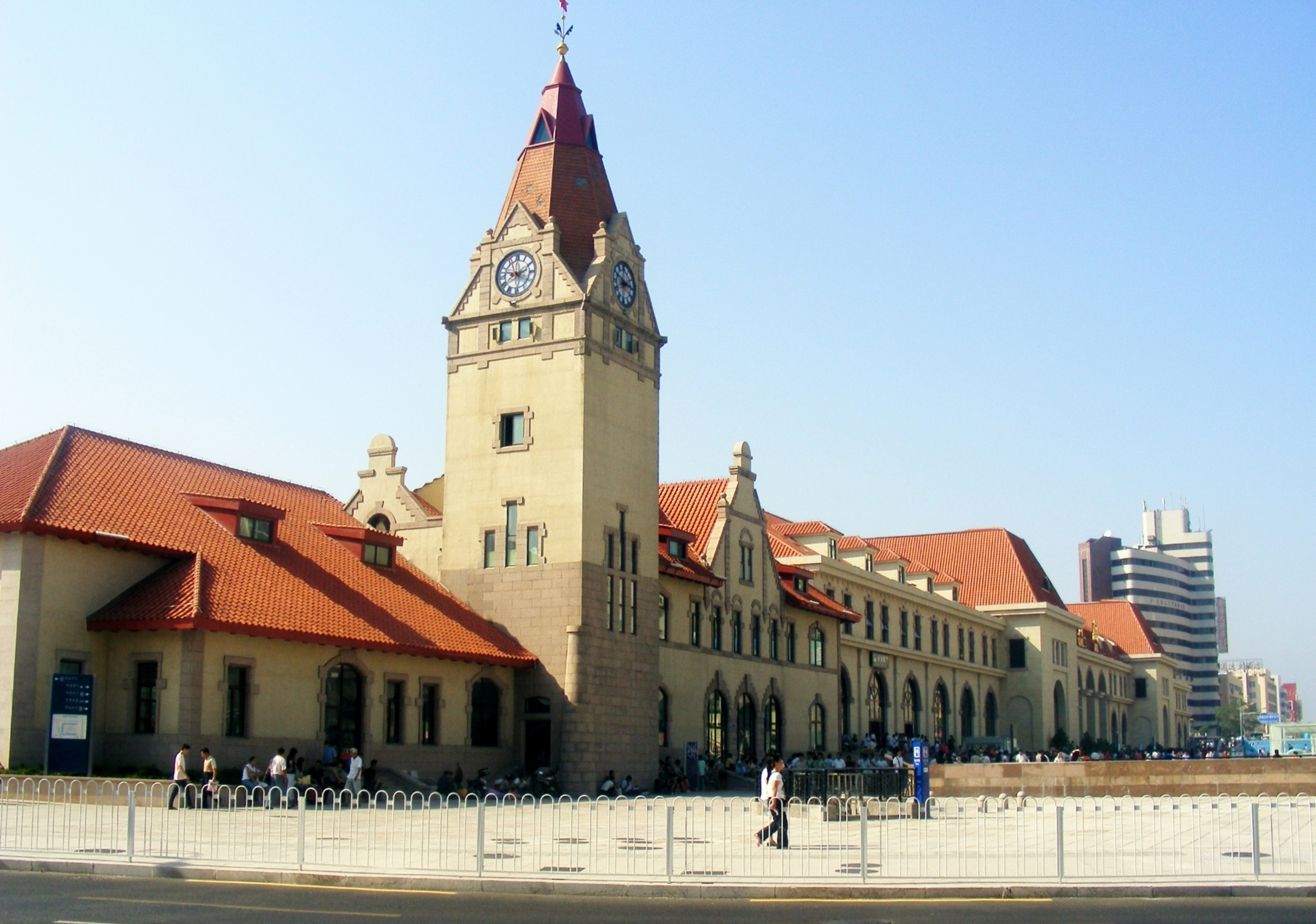
After 2008

== Qingdao Metro ==
Qingdao Railway Station 青岛站
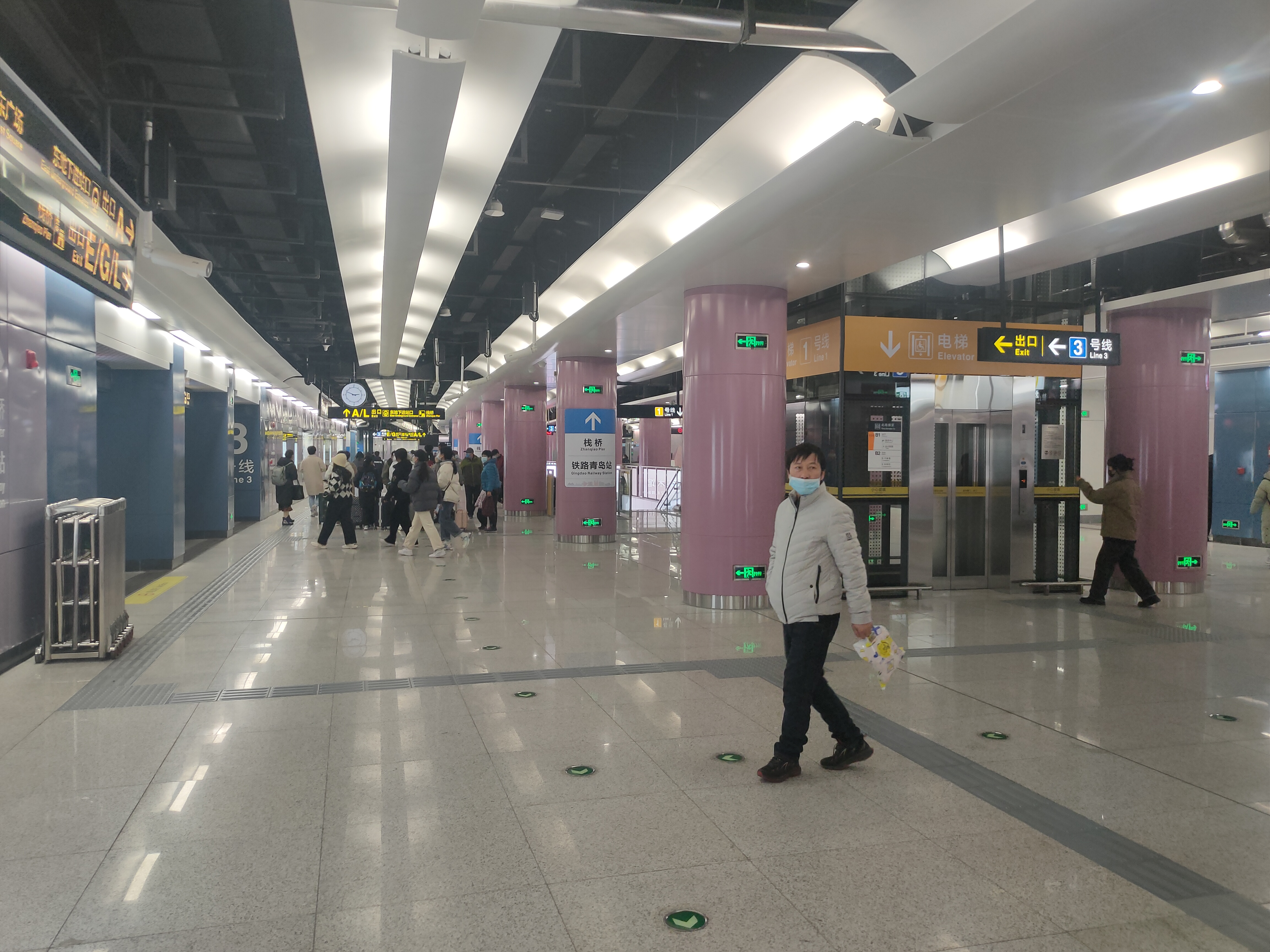

General information
- Location: Shinan District, Qingdao, Shandong; China
- Operator: Qingdao Metro Corporation
- Lines: Line 1 Line 3
- Platforms: 4 (2 island platforms)

History
- Opened: 18 December 2016

Services
Preceding station	Qingdao Metro	Following station
Xizhen towards Wangjiagang	Line 1	Zhongshan Road towards Dongguozhuang
Terminus	Line 3	Hall of the People towards Qingdao North Railway Station
Location

Qingdao Railway Station (Chinese: 青岛站) is a station on Line 1 and Line 3 of the Qingdao Metro. It opened on 18 December 2016. It is located in Shinan District and it serves Qingdao railway station.

=== Gallery ===
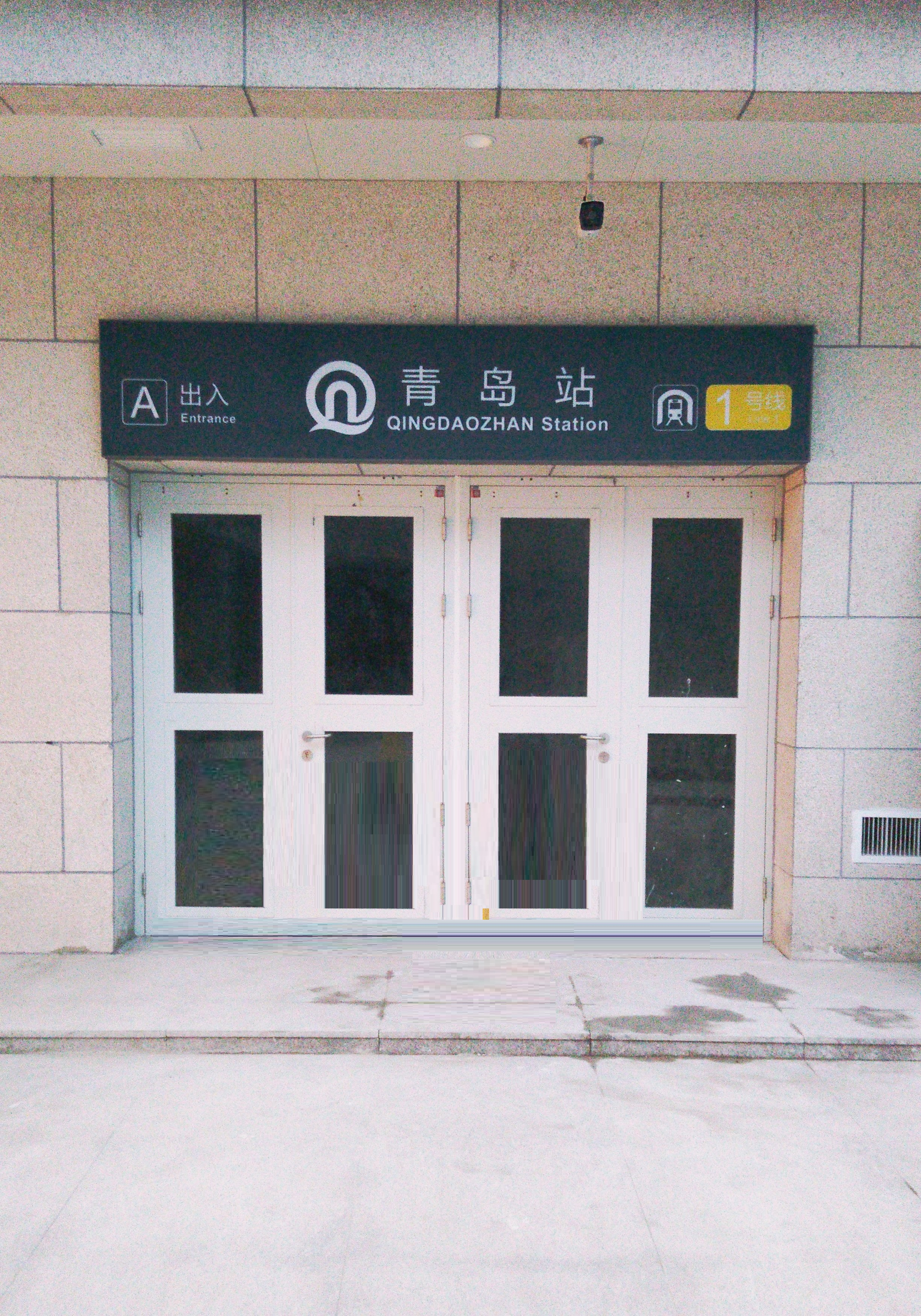
Entrance A

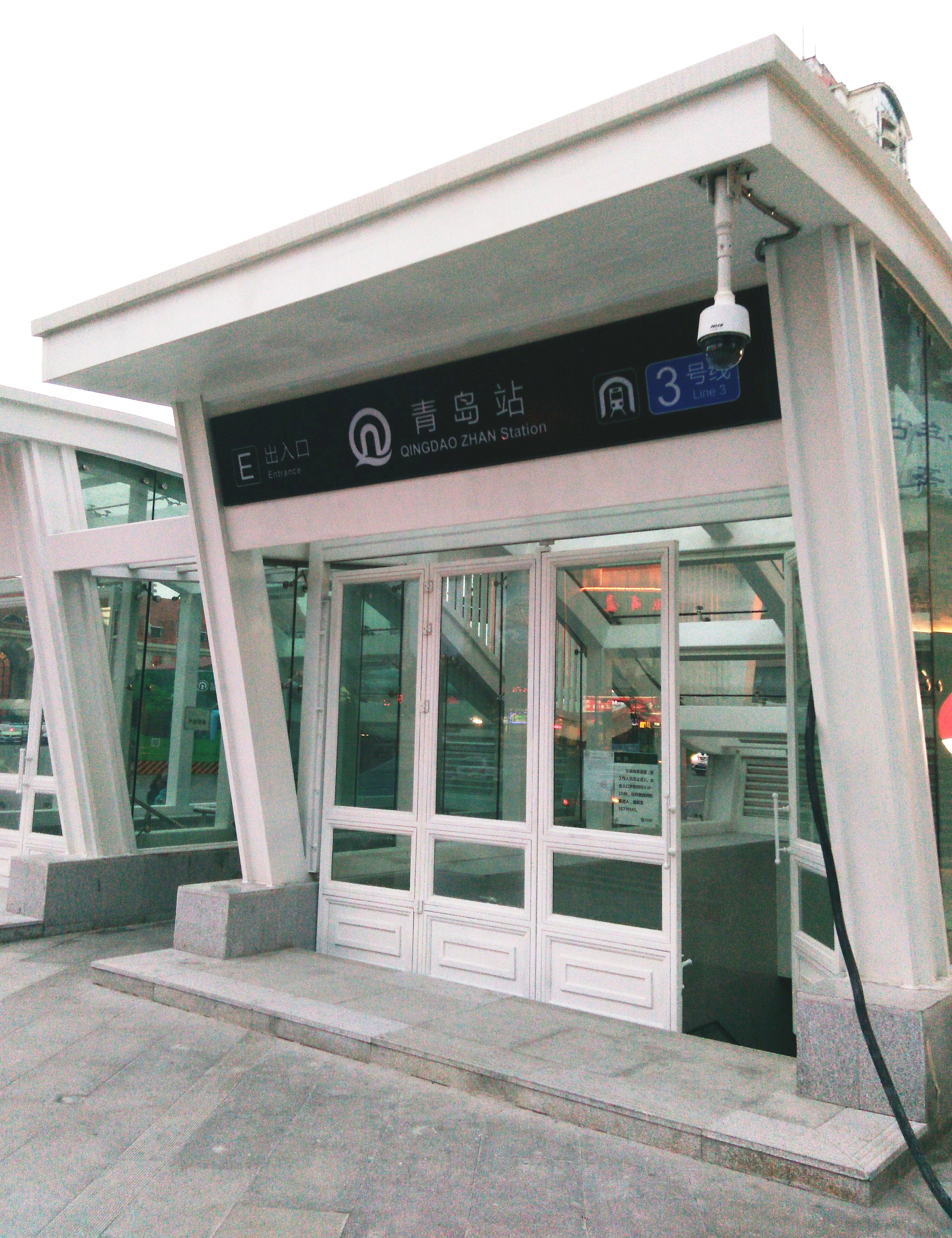
Entrance E

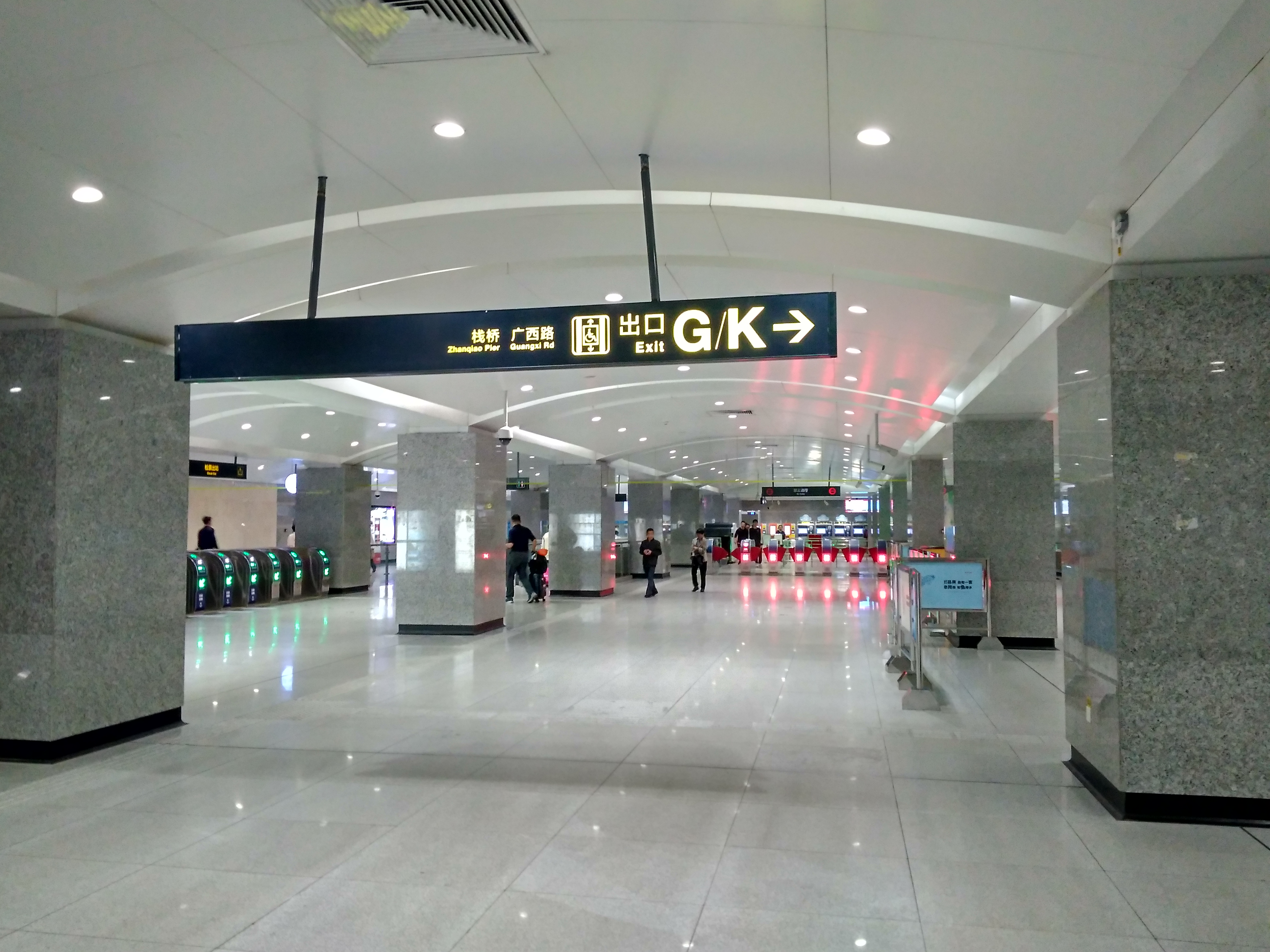
Concourse

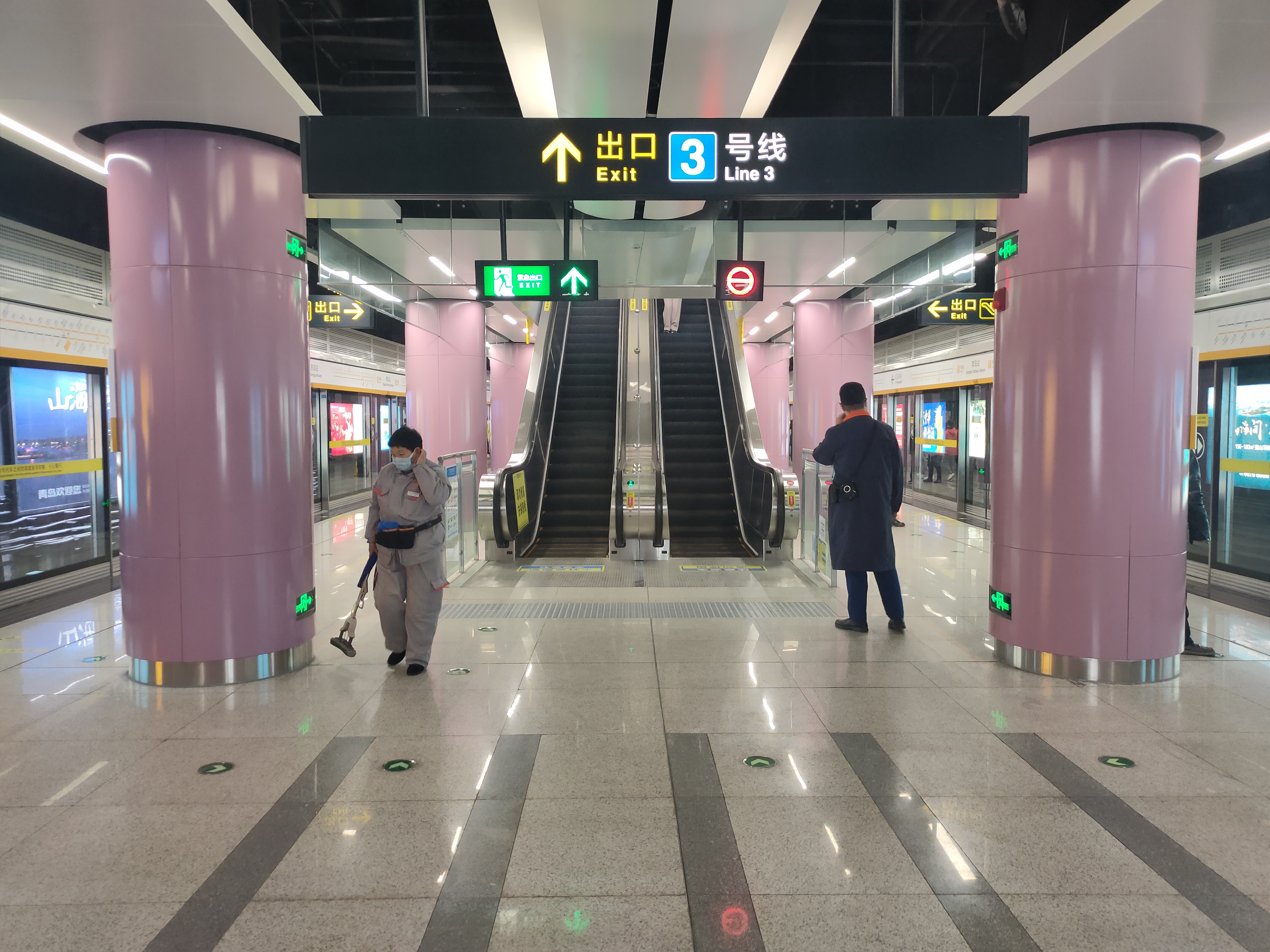
Line 1 platform

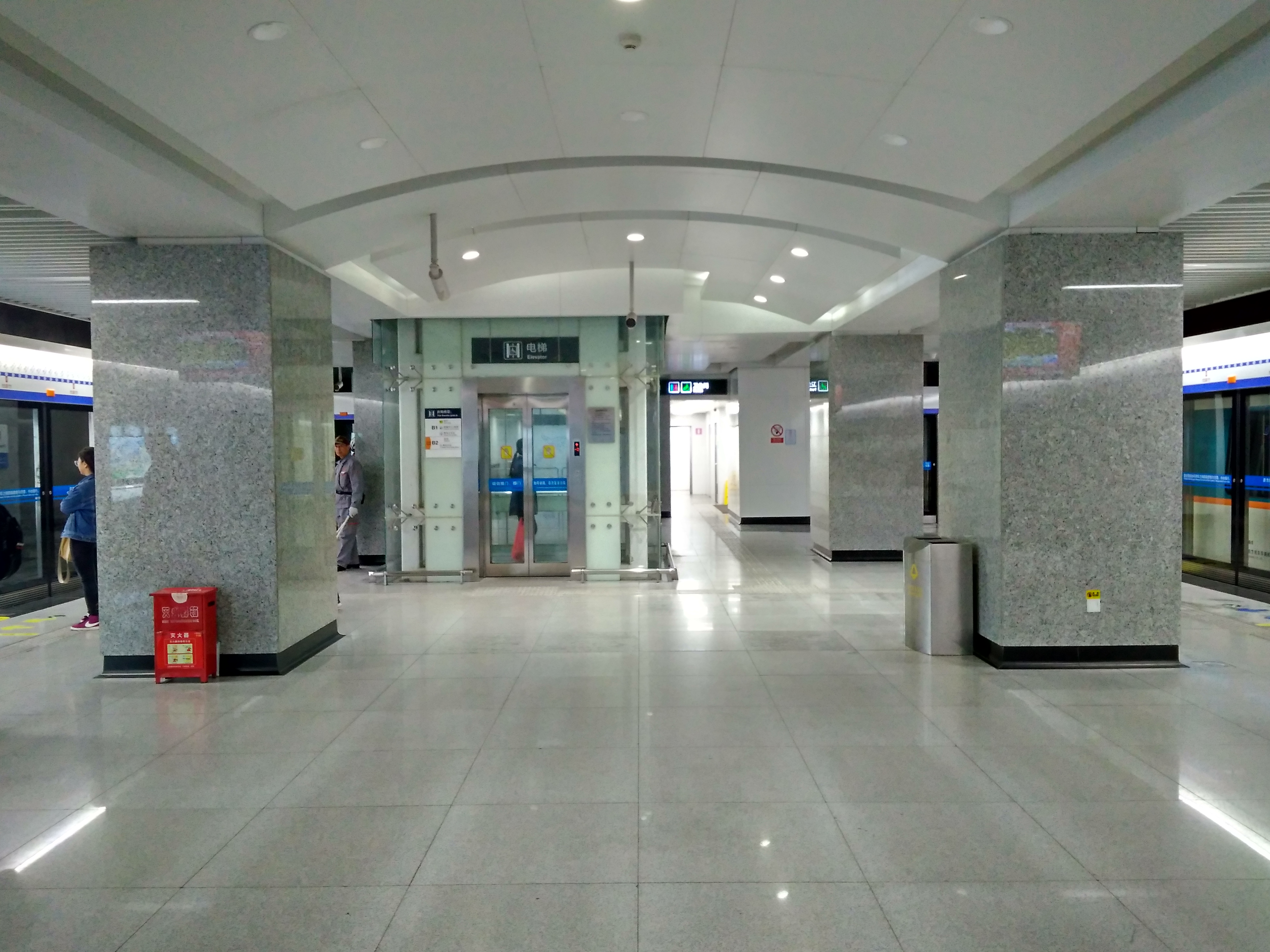
Line 3 platform

== See also ==
- Qingdao North Railway Station
- Qingdao West Railway Station
- Qingdao Airport railway station

Preceding station	China Railway High-speed	Following station
Terminus	Qingdao–Jinan passenger railway	Qingdaobei towards Jinan
