= China Railway Jinan Group =

Railway operator in Shandong, China

China Railway Jinan Group Co., Ltd.
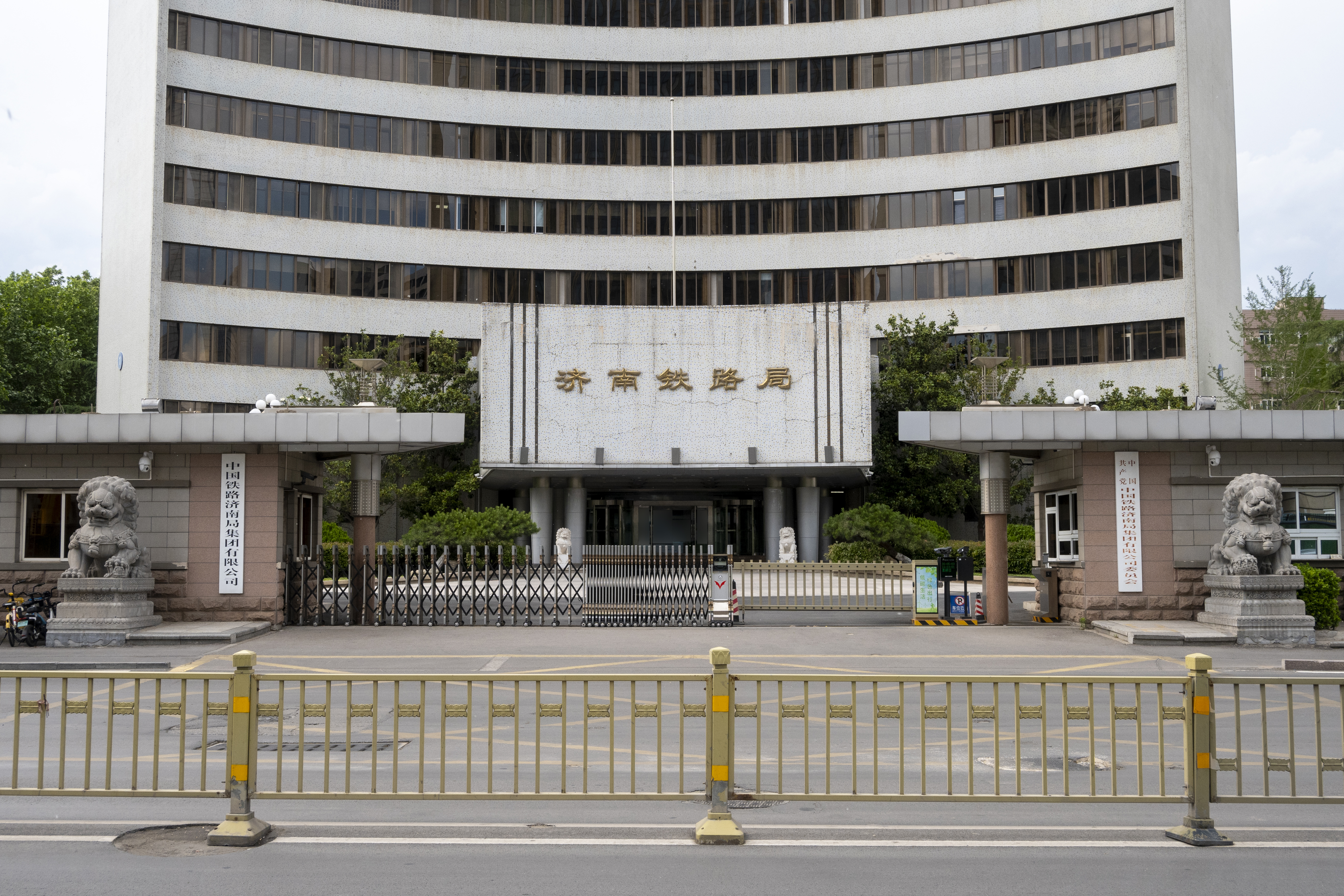
- Headquarter of CR Jinan
- Type: state-owned enterprise
- Industry: Railway operations
- Predecessor: Jinan Railway Administration
- Founded: 19 November 2017
- Headquarters: 2 Zhanqian Road, Tianqiao, Jinan, Shandong, China
- Area served: Shandong
- Owner: Government of China
- Parent: China Railway
- Website: Official Website

China Railway Jinan Group
- Simplified Chinese: 中国铁路济南局集团
- Traditional Chinese: 中國鐵路濟南局集團
Transcriptions
Standard Mandarin
- Hanyu Pinyin: Zhōngguó Tiělù Jǐnán Jú Jítuán

Jinan Railway Administration
- Simplified Chinese: 济南铁路局
- Traditional Chinese: 濟南鐵路局
Transcriptions
Standard Mandarin
- Hanyu Pinyin: Jǐnán Tiělù Jú

CR Jinan
- Simplified Chinese: 济铁
- Traditional Chinese: 濟鐵
Transcriptions
Standard Mandarin
- Hanyu Pinyin: Jǐtiě

China Railway Jinan Group, officially abbreviated as CR Jinan or CR-Jinan, formerly, Jinan Railway Administration is a subsidiary company under the jurisdiction of the China Railway (formerly the Ministry of Railway). The railway administration was reorganized as a company in November 2017.

It is responsible for the railway network within Shandong Province, with a total length of 8,283.9 kilometers, and consisting of 295 railway stations.

== Hub stations ==
- Jinan
  - Jinan, Jinan West, Jinan East (U/C)
- Qingdao
  - Qingdao, Qingdao North

== Regional services ==
=== C-train services ===
- Qingrong
