= Qingzhou (disambiguation) =

Qingzhou is a county-level city in Shandong, China.

Qingzhou may also refer to:

== Towns and townships ==
- Qingzhou, Fujian, a town in Shaxian District, Sanming, Fujian, China
- Qingzhou, Guangdong, a town in Heping County, Guangdong, China
- Qingzhou, Hebei, a town in Qing County, Hebei, China
- Qingzhou Township, a township in Jiajiang County, Sichuan, China

== Historical locations ==
- Qing Province (青州), one of the Nine Provinces in ancient China
- Qīng Prefecture (青州), a prefecture in modern Shandong, China between the 6th and 11th centuries, named after the ancient province
- Qingzhou Prefecture (青州府), a prefecture in modern Shandong, China between the 14th and 20th centuries, named after the ancient province
- Qìng Prefecture (慶州), a prefecture in modern Gansu, China between the 6th and 11th centuries

== Spacecraft ==
- Qingzhou, spacecraft, a cargo spacecraft developed by CAS Space

== Building ==
- Qingzhou Bridge, a bridge over the Min River in Fuzhou, Fujian, China

== See also ==
- Ching Chau (disambiguation) — Cantonese equivalent
- Qing (disambiguation)
- Cheongju, a city in North Chungcheong, South Korea, known as "Qingzhou" in Chinese
- Gyeongju, a city in North Gyeongsang, South Korea, also known as "Qingzhou" in Chinese
