= Sitou =

Sitou may refer to these places in China:

- Sitou, Shandong, in Linqu County, Shandong
- Sitou Township, Yangcheng County, Shanxi
