= Shouguang =

Shouguang 寿光市 Showkwang, Shou-kuang
- County-level city
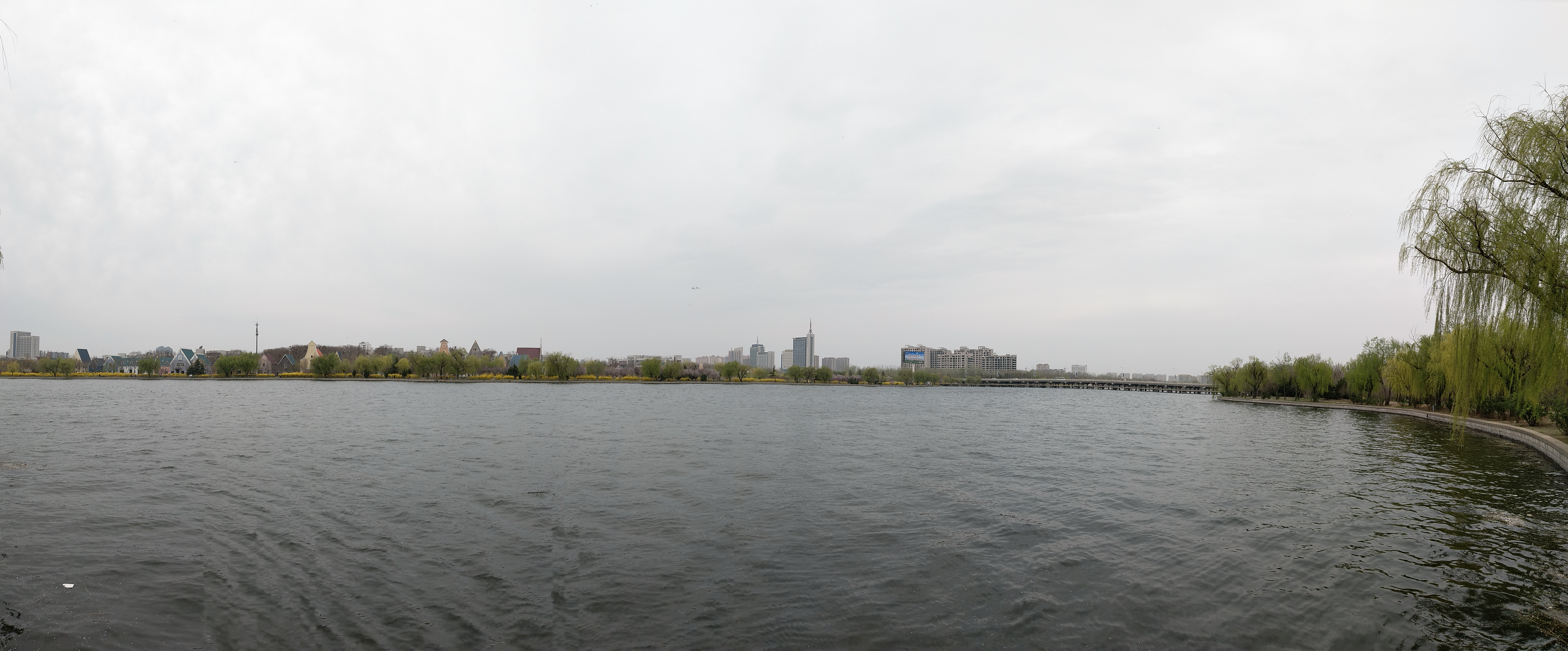

- Location in Shandong
- Coordinates (Shouguang municipal government): 36°51′25″N 118°47′28″E
- Country: People's Republic of China
- Province: Shandong
- Prefecture-level city: Weifang

Government
  - CPC Secretary: Li Peng
  - Mayor: Zhao Tianbao

Area
  - Total: 2,200 km^{2} (850 sq mi)

Population (2018)
  - Total: 1,103,110
- Time zone: UTC+8 (China Standard)
- Postal code: 262700
- Area code: (0)536
- Website: www.shouguang.gov.cn

Shouguang (simplified Chinese: 寿光; traditional Chinese: 壽光; pinyin: Shòuguāng) is a county-level city in the north-central part of Shandong Province, China, situated on the southwest shore of Laizhou Bay. Under the administration of the prefecture-level city of Weifang, it has 1,139,454 people residing within the municipality and its surrounding towns and villages as of the 2010 Census, even though the built-up (or metro) area is much smaller.

It is also known as the 'home of vegetables' in China, owing to its large agricultural output.

== History ==
Shouguang is located on an alluvial plain drained by the Mihe River. This region of Shandong is one of the first places where grains were cultivated. It was also the site of the Neolithic Dawenkou and Beixin cultures. The settlement of Shouguang can be traced back to a Dongyi settlement around 3000 B.C. It was then ruled by State of Qi during the Eastern Zhou dynasty. After Qi was conquered by Qin, Shouguang was put under the administration of Qi Commandery.

During the Han dynasty (202 BC–220 AD), Shouguang was established as a county. During that time, it was already one of the largest grain cultivation bases in China, as well as a salt trading center. Shouguang was under the administration of Beihai Commandery from Han to Sui dynasty. In the 6th century, Jia Sixie was born and lived here, he wrote an ancient agricultural reference work Qimin Yaoshu. From 6th to 13th century, Shouguang was a county under Qing Prefecture.

During the Ming and Qing Dynasties, Shouguang was under the administration of Qingzhou Prefecture, then vegetables from Shouguang were well regarded. In January 1868, the Nian army got completely annihilated at the mouth of Jiaolai River in Shouguang.

After the establishment of central planning under Mao Zedong's rule, the city lost its standing as a vegetable producer. In 1984, the city government built a vegetable wholesales market and improved transportation of produce. The market would grow to become China's largest vegetable trading center. In 1989, farmers started utilizing plastic greenhouses and started focusing on higher quality produce. In 2000, Shouguang hosted the World Vegetables Expo. Between 2000 and 2011, the annual growth rate of the local agricultural industry was 11.12%.

== Administrative divisions ==
As of 2012, this city is divided to 5 subdistricts and 9 towns.

Subdistricts

- Shengcheng Subdistrict (圣城街道)
- Wenjia Subdistrict (文家街道)
- Gucheng Subdistrict (古城街道)
- Luocheng Subdistrict (洛城街道)
- Sunjiaji Subdistrict (孙家集街道)

Towns

- Hualong (化龙镇)
- Yingli (营里镇)
- Taitou (台头镇)
- Tianliu (田柳镇)
- Shangkou (上口镇)
- Houzhen (侯镇镇)
- Jitai (纪台镇)
- Daotian (稻田镇)
- Yangkou (羊口镇)

== Climate ==
Climate data for Shouguang, elevation 23 m (75 ft), (1991–2020 normals, extremes 1981–2010)
Month	Jan	Feb	Mar	Apr	May	Jun	Jul	Aug	Sep	Oct	Nov	Dec	Year
Record high °C (°F)	19.2 (66.6)	25.2 (77.4)	32.9 (91.2)	35.6 (96.1)	38.6 (101.5)	42.5 (108.5)	39.8 (103.6)	37.8 (100.0)	38.1 (100.6)	34.8 (94.6)	26.3 (79.3)	22.6 (72.7)	42.5 (108.5)
Mean daily maximum °C (°F)	3.7 (38.7)	7.5 (45.5)	14.1 (57.4)	21.2 (70.2)	26.8 (80.2)	31.0 (87.8)	32.2 (90.0)	30.7 (87.3)	27.3 (81.1)	21.2 (70.2)	13.0 (55.4)	5.8 (42.4)	19.5 (67.2)
Daily mean °C (°F)	−1.7 (28.9)	1.5 (34.7)	7.6 (45.7)	14.6 (58.3)	20.6 (69.1)	25.0 (77.0)	27.2 (81.0)	26.0 (78.8)	21.6 (70.9)	15.2 (59.4)	7.4 (45.3)	0.5 (32.9)	13.8 (56.8)
Mean daily minimum °C (°F)	−5.8 (21.6)	−3.0 (26.6)	2.3 (36.1)	8.8 (47.8)	14.8 (58.6)	19.8 (67.6)	23.1 (73.6)	22.2 (72.0)	17.0 (62.6)	10.3 (50.5)	2.8 (37.0)	−3.6 (25.5)	9.1 (48.3)
Record low °C (°F)	−20.2 (−4.4)	−15.9 (3.4)	−9.4 (15.1)	−3.8 (25.2)	1.1 (34.0)	8.4 (47.1)	15.2 (59.4)	13.2 (55.8)	5.9 (42.6)	−3.4 (25.9)	−13.7 (7.3)	−22.2 (−8.0)	−22.2 (−8.0)
Average precipitation mm (inches)	6.4 (0.25)	12.6 (0.50)	11.3 (0.44)	26.9 (1.06)	49.0 (1.93)	75.9 (2.99)	130.8 (5.15)	173.9 (6.85)	46.6 (1.83)	28.6 (1.13)	27.5 (1.08)	9.6 (0.38)	599.1 (23.59)
Average precipitation days (≥ 0.1 mm)	2.2	2.9	3.0	5.5	6.6	8.0	11.7	11.3	6.3	5.6	4.1	3.4	70.6
Average snowy days	3.4	2.8	1.1	0.1	0	0	0	0	0	0	0.5	2.1	10
Average relative humidity (%)	61	57	51	53	57	62	74	79	71	65	64	62	63
Mean monthly sunshine hours	165.2	170.7	218.0	235.8	265.8	231.6	192.2	187.5	195.0	193.8	164.6	165.2	2,385.4
Percentage possible sunshine	54	55	58	60	60	53	43	45	53	56	54	55	54
Source: China Meteorological Administration

== Economy ==
Shouguang is a major hub for vegetables and produce in China, as well as being a major hub for chemical products. Alongside the agricultural industry, related industries such as the packaging and food processing and fertilizer industry have been established. In 2011, Shouguang was the largest glossy and coated paper producer in China. On the coastline fisheries, aquaculture and salt production sites are located.

== Sports ==
The Shouguang Chengtou Stadium is located in Shouguang. The 25,000-capacity stadium is used mostly for association football matches and also sometimes for athletics.

== Gallery ==
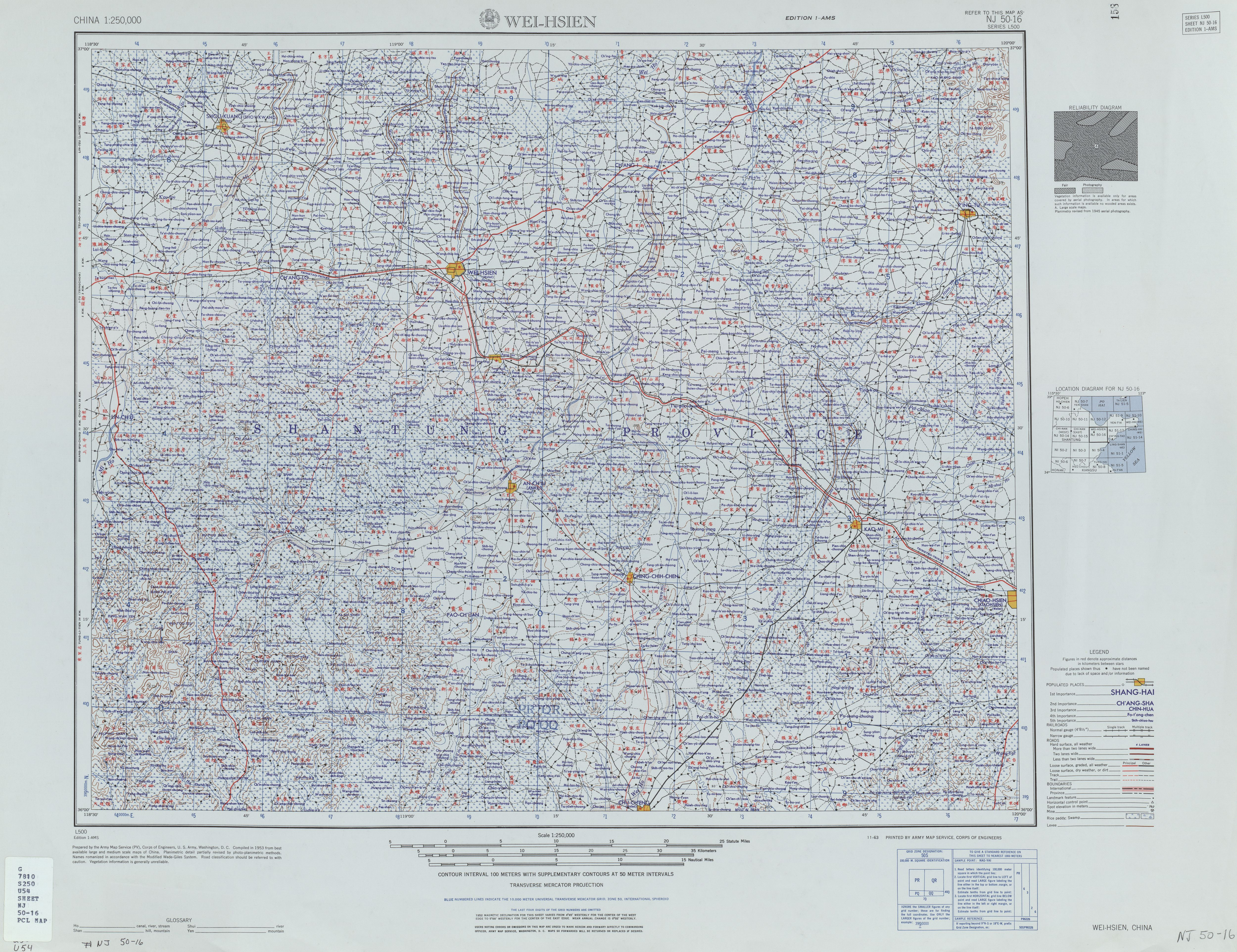
Map including Shouguang (labeled as 壽光 SHOU-KUANG (SHOWKWANG) (Walled)) (AMS, 1953)

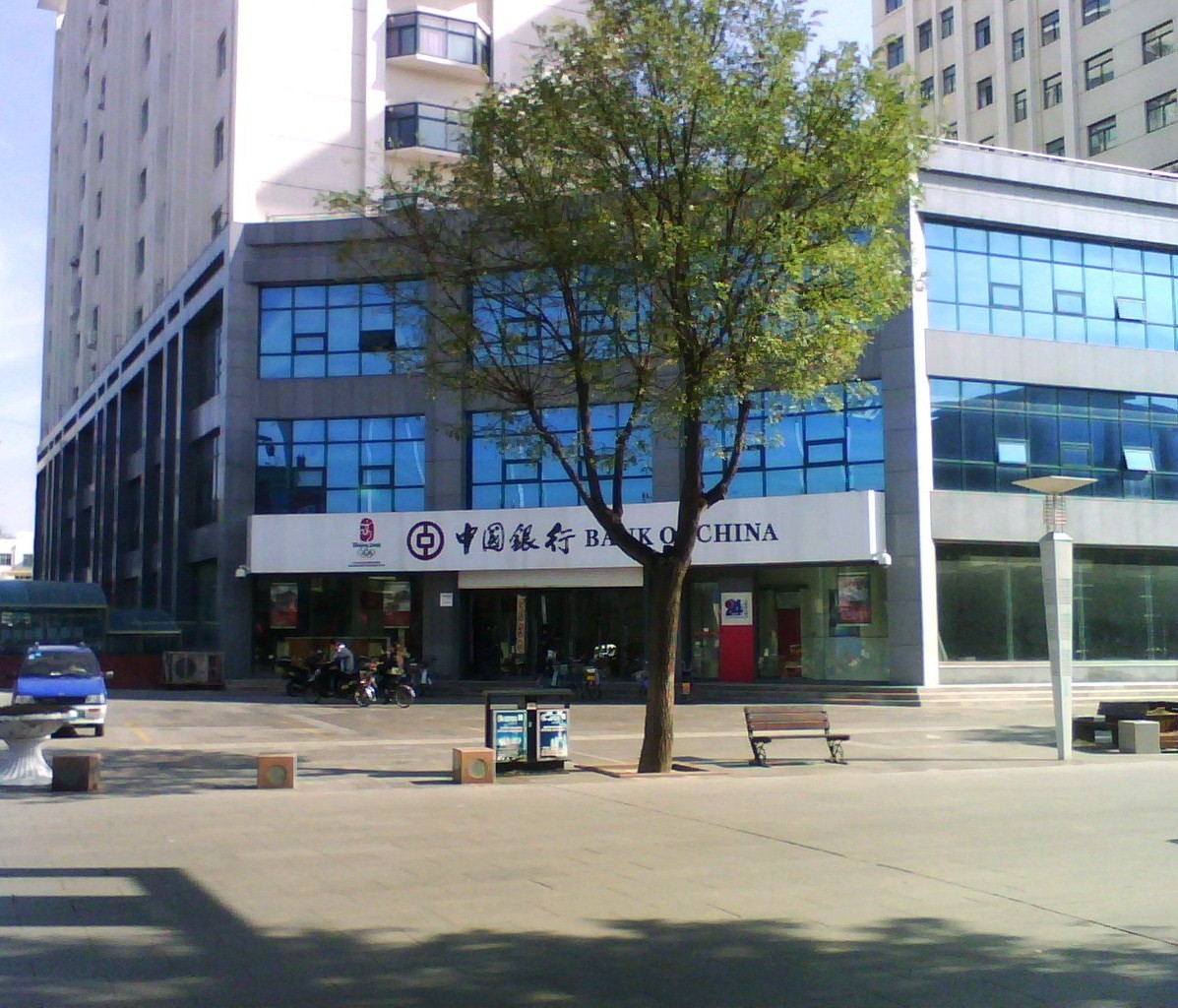
Shouguang city. Bank of China.

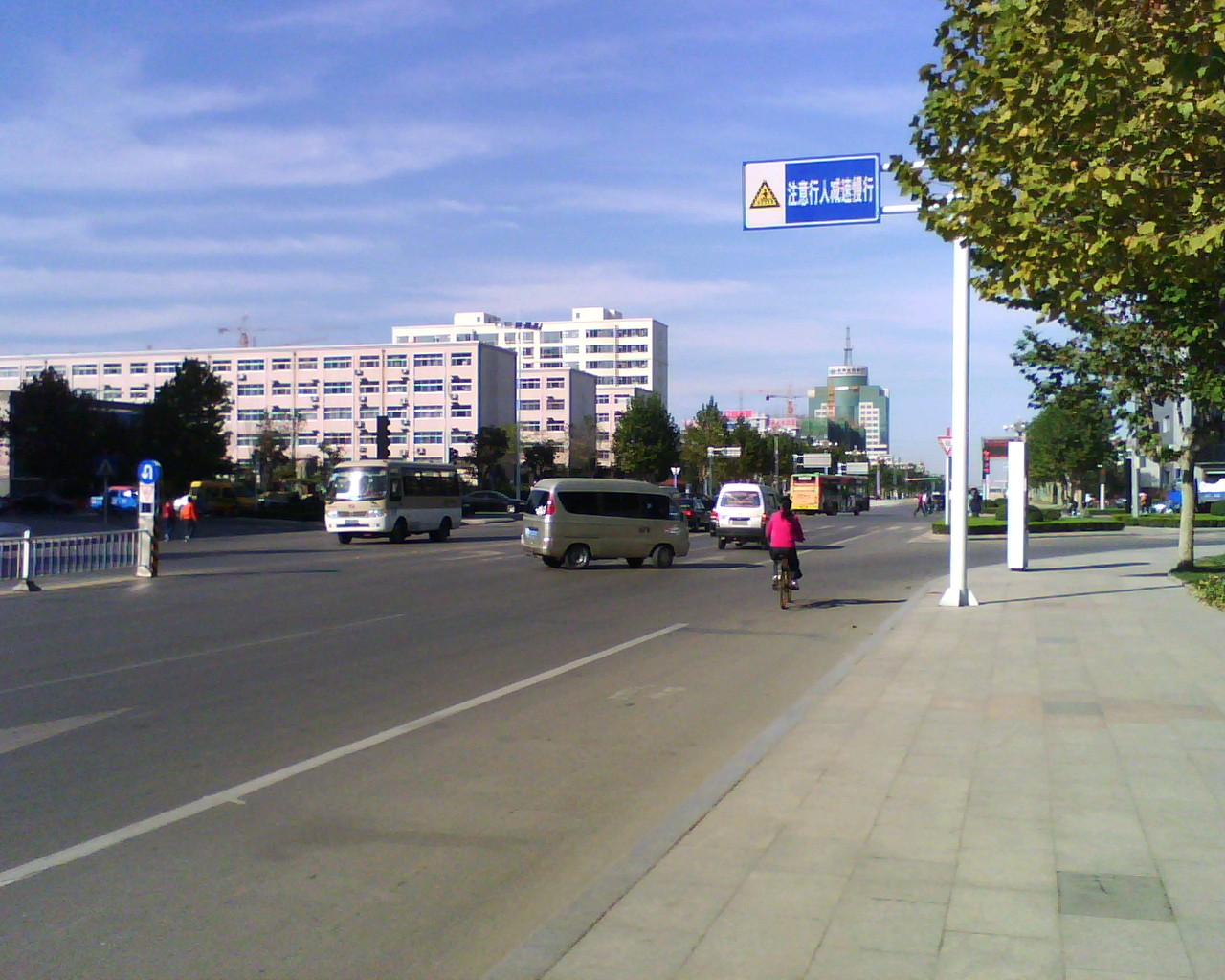
Shouguang city. One of the streets.

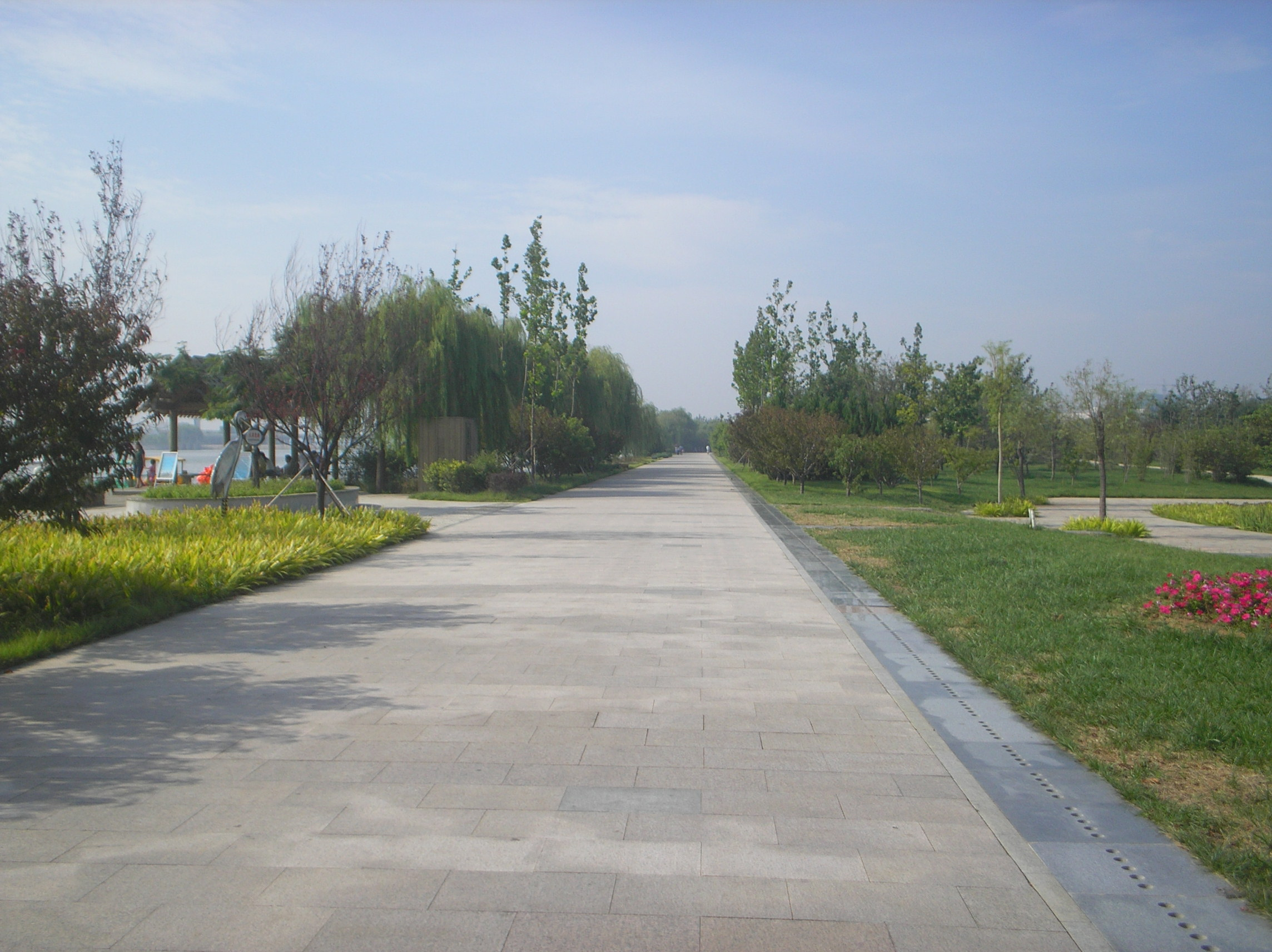
Shouguang Mihe park

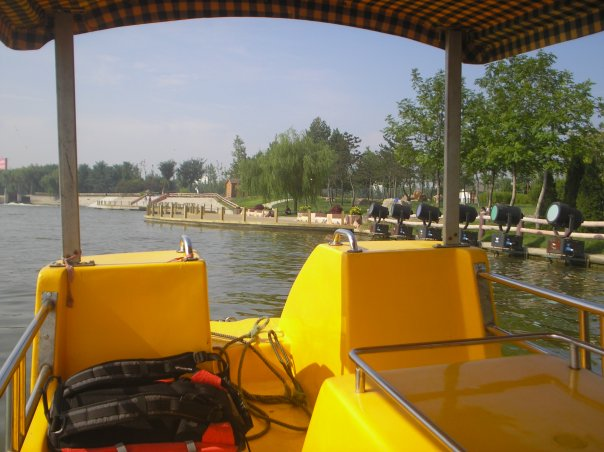
Shouguang Mihe park. Taking a boat.

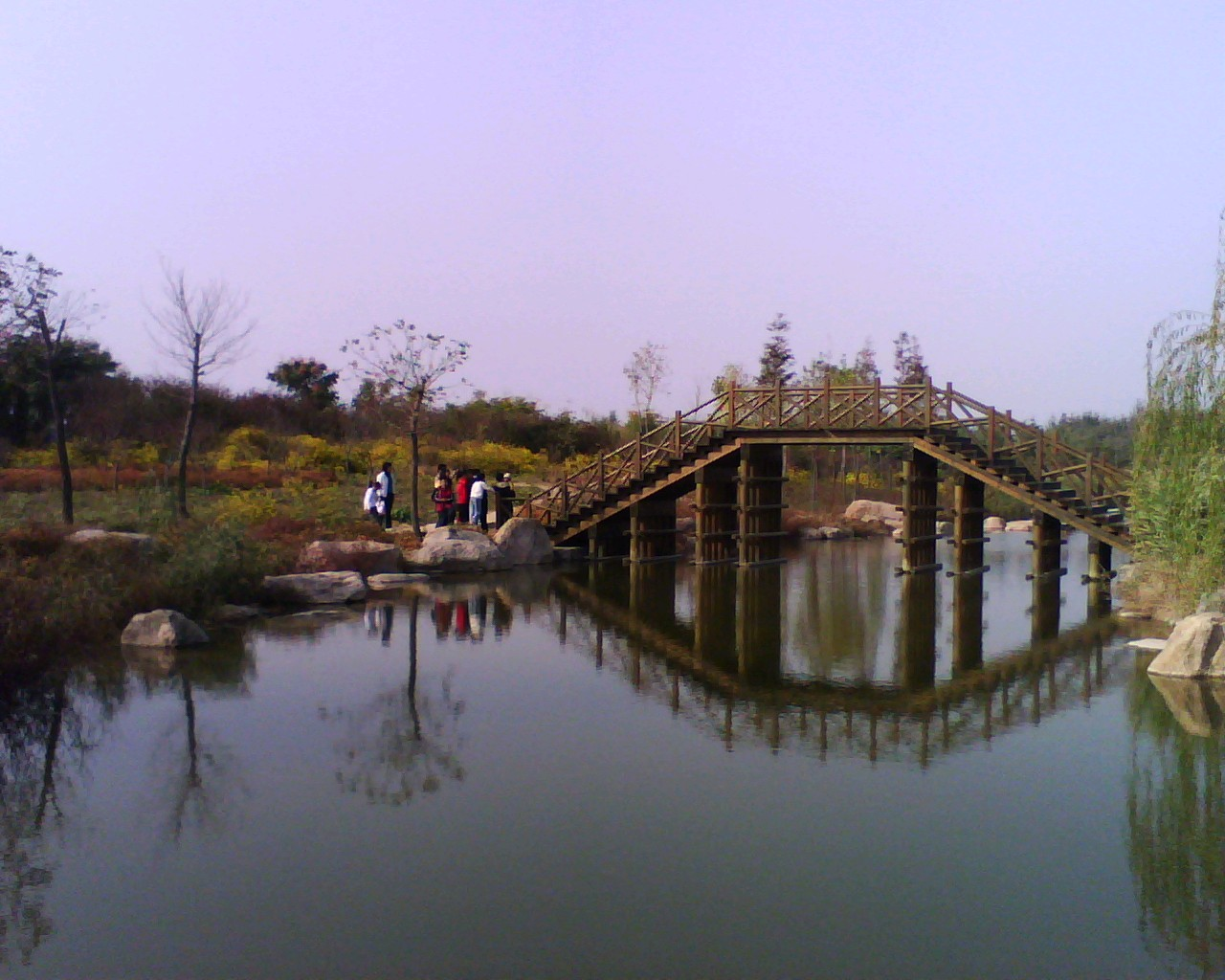
Shouguang Mihe park. Bridge.

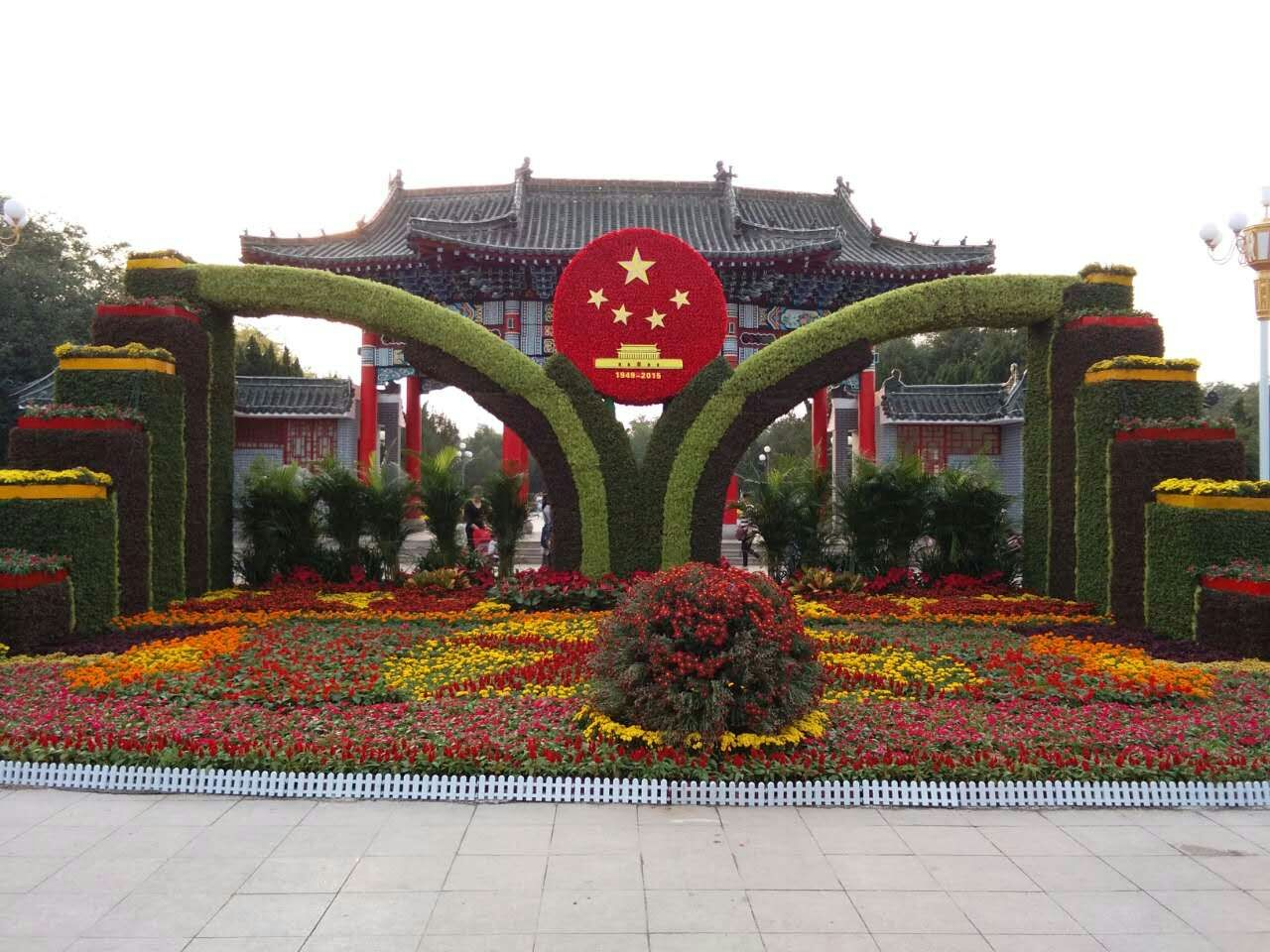
Shouguang Cangsheng Park on October 3, 2015.

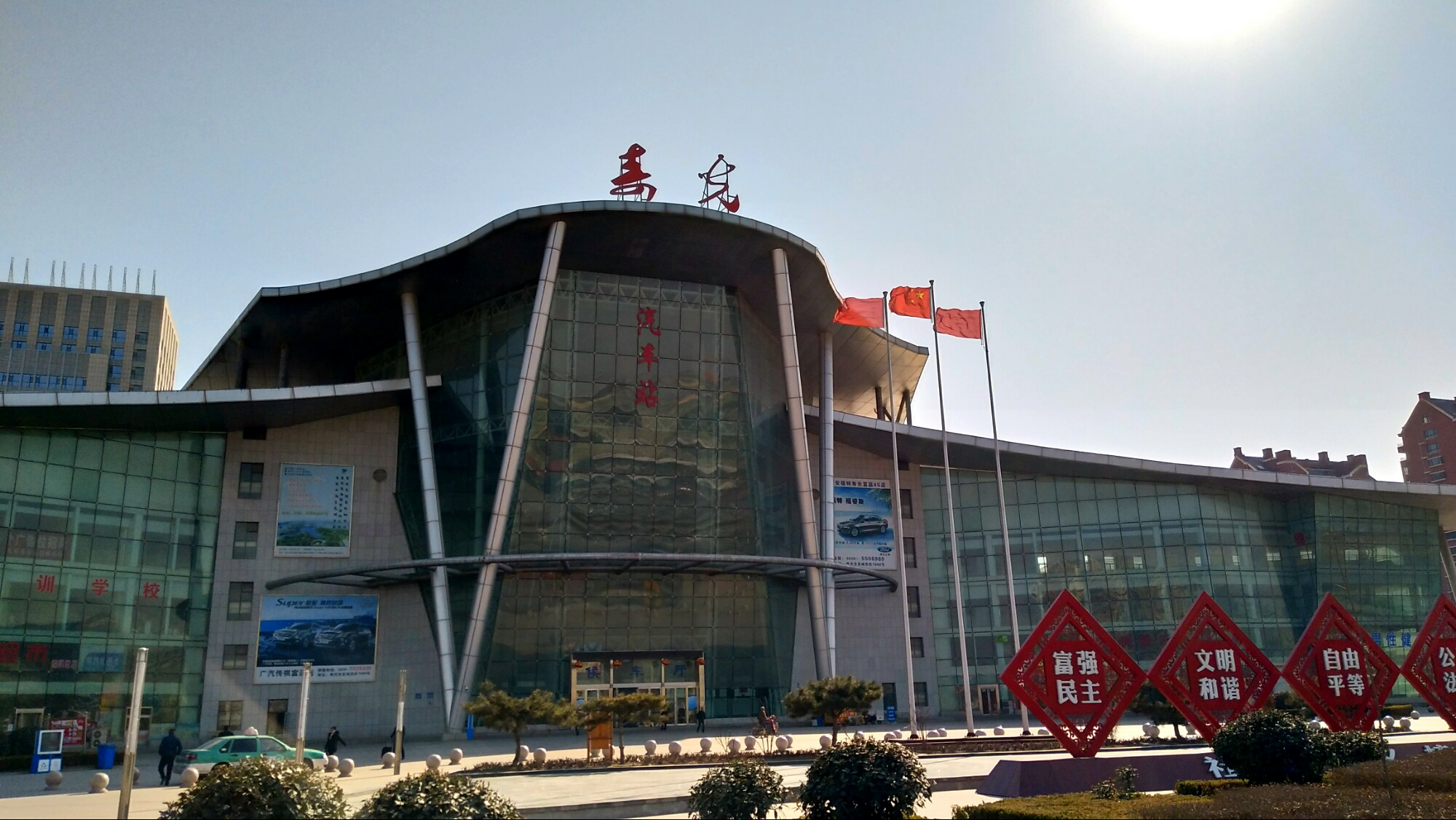
Shouguang Bus Station.

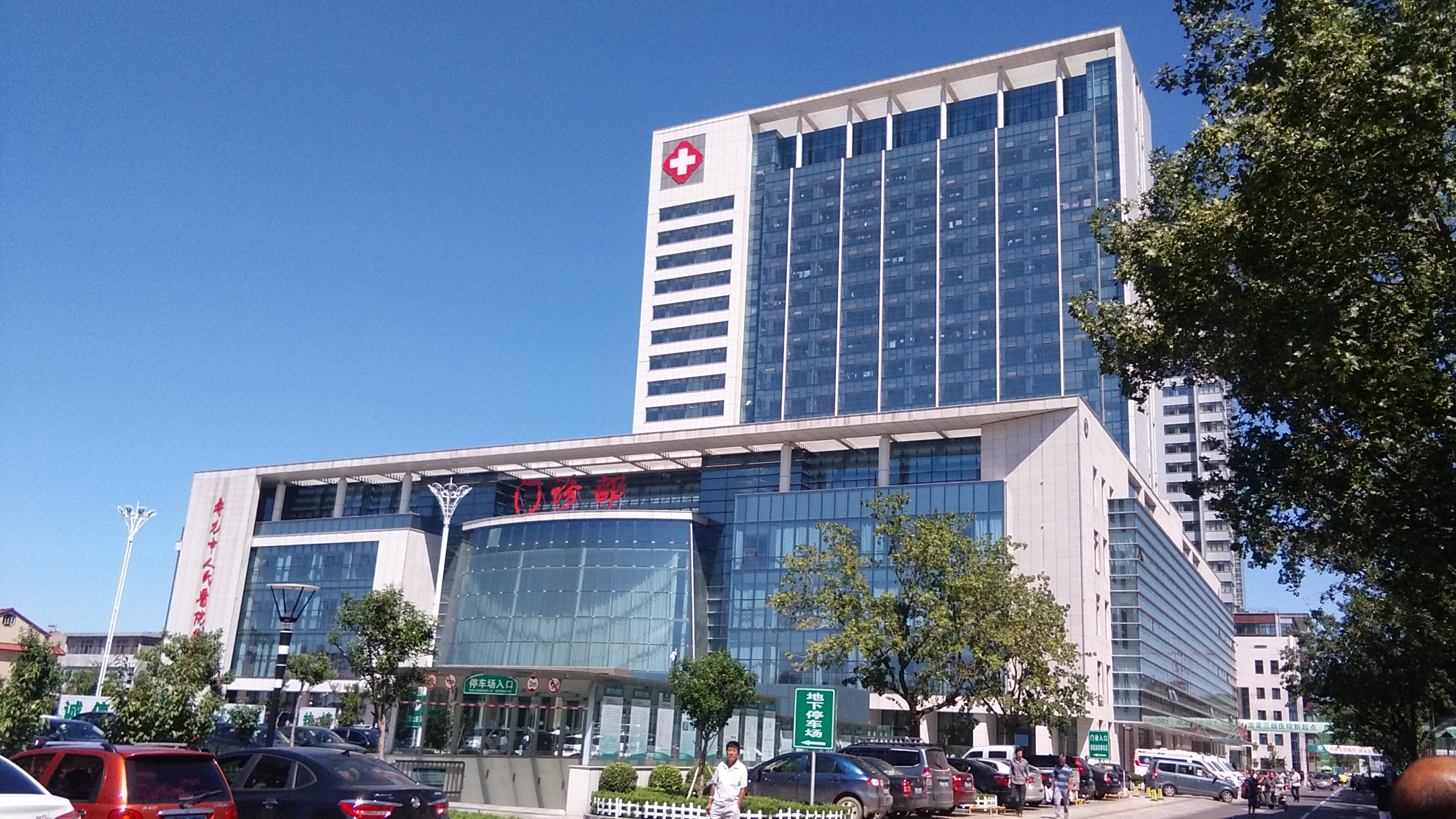
Shouguang People's Hospital.
