= Ching Chau =

Ching Chau or Tsing Chau may refer to:

- Ilha Verde, former island, now an area on Macau Peninsula, Macau
- Green Island, Hong Kong, an island within Central and Western District, Hong Kong, Hong Kong
- Steep Island, Hong Kong, an island near Clear Water Bay within Sai Kung District, the New Territories, Hong Kong
- Ching Chau, an island in Tsam Chuk Wan, within Sai Kung District, the New Territories, Hong Kong
- Pillar Island, a former island in Rambler Channel, the New Territories, Hong Kong
- Tsing Chau, an islet near Sharp Island, the New Territories, Hong Kong, with a lighthouse

== See also ==
- Qingzhou (disambiguation) — Mandarin equivalent
- Green Island (disambiguation)
