= Yishan =

Yishan may refer to:

- Yishan (official) (奕山; ? – 1878), an official during the Qing dynasty
- Yishan Yining (一山 一寧; 1247–1317), a Zen master
- Yishan Wong (Reddit CEO)

== Locations in China ==
- Yishan, Guanyun County (伊山镇), town in Guanyun County, Jiangsu
- Yishan, Linqu County (沂山镇), town in Linqu County, Shandong
- Yishan, Zoucheng (峄山镇), town in Zoucheng, Shandong
- Yishan, Cangnan County (宜山镇), town in Cangnan County, Zhejiang
- Yishan County (宜山县), currently Yizhou District, Hechi, Guangxi

== See also ==
- Binhai Yishan light rail station
