= Liushan, Shandong =

Liushan 柳山镇
- Town
- Location in Shandong
- Coordinates: 36°26′46″N 118°45′23″E
- Country: People's Republic of China
- Province: Shandong
- Prefecture-level city: Weifang
- County: Linqu County
- Time zone: UTC+8 (China Standard)

Liushan (Chinese: 柳山镇) is a town in Linqu County, Weifang, in Shandong province, China. As of 2020, it has 21 villages under its administration.

- Liushanzhai Village (柳山寨村)
- Xinzhuang Village (辛庄村)
- Houtuan Village (后疃村)
- Houjiazhuang Village (侯家庄村)
- Fanjiahe Village (范家河村)
- Mazhuang Village (马庄村)
- Houjiahe Village (侯家河村)
- Guojiazhuang Village (郭家庄村)
- Yingshanhe Village (英山河村)
- Sunzhuang Village (孙庄村)
- Zhujiagou Village (朱家沟村)
- Hongshan Village (洪山村)
- Yanghe Village (洋河村)
- Xinshan Village (辛山村)
- Cuifei Village (翠飞村)
- Dujiazhuang Village (杜家庄村)
- Miaoshan Village (庙山村)
- Chengtou Village (城头村)
- Xujiahe Village (徐家河村)
- Weijia Village (魏家村)
- Fengjiagou Village (冯家沟村)
