= Qīng Prefecture =

Historical administrative division in Shandong, China

Coordinates: 36.6967°N 118.4797°E

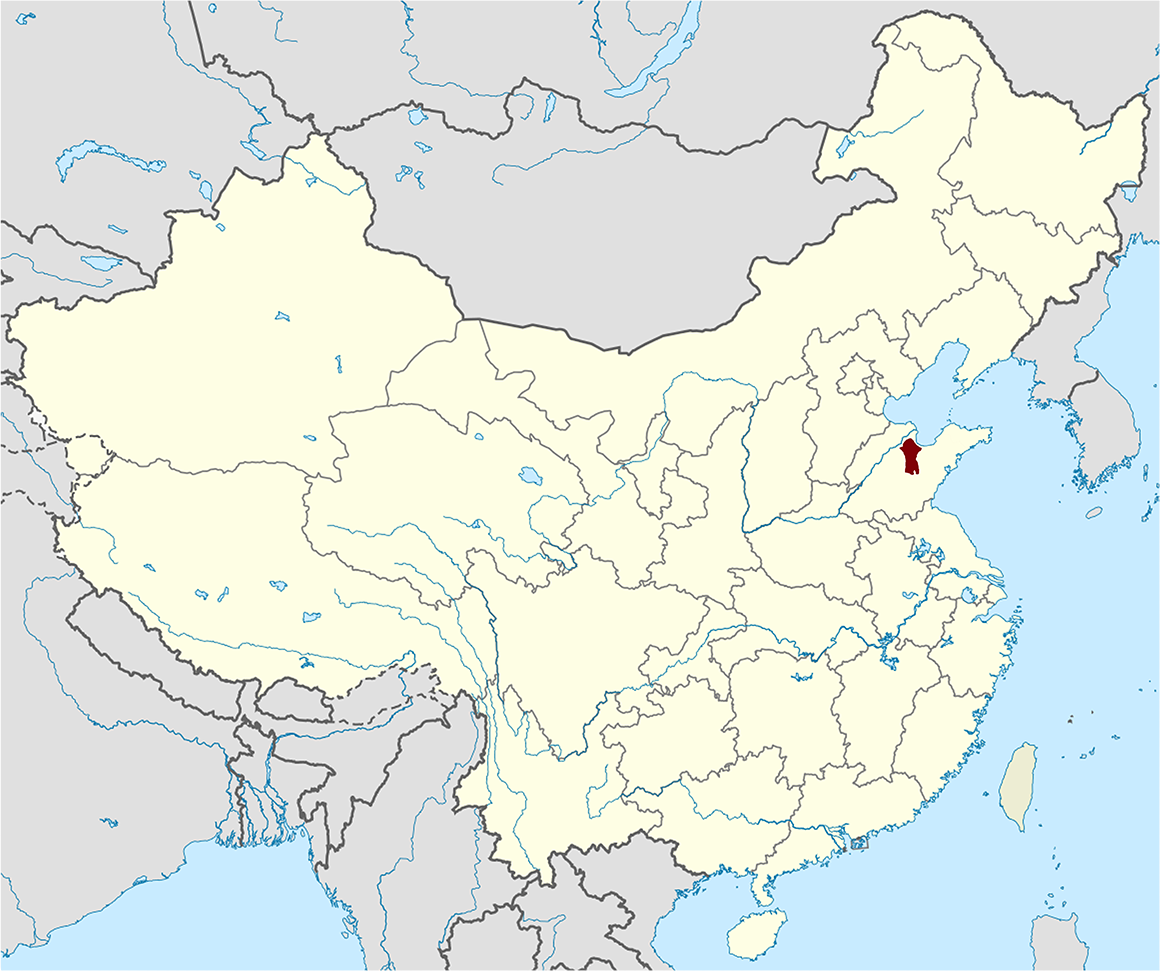
- Chinese: 青州
Transcriptions
Standard Mandarin
- Hanyu Pinyin: Qīng Zhōu
- Wade–Giles: Ch'ing^{1} Chou^{1}

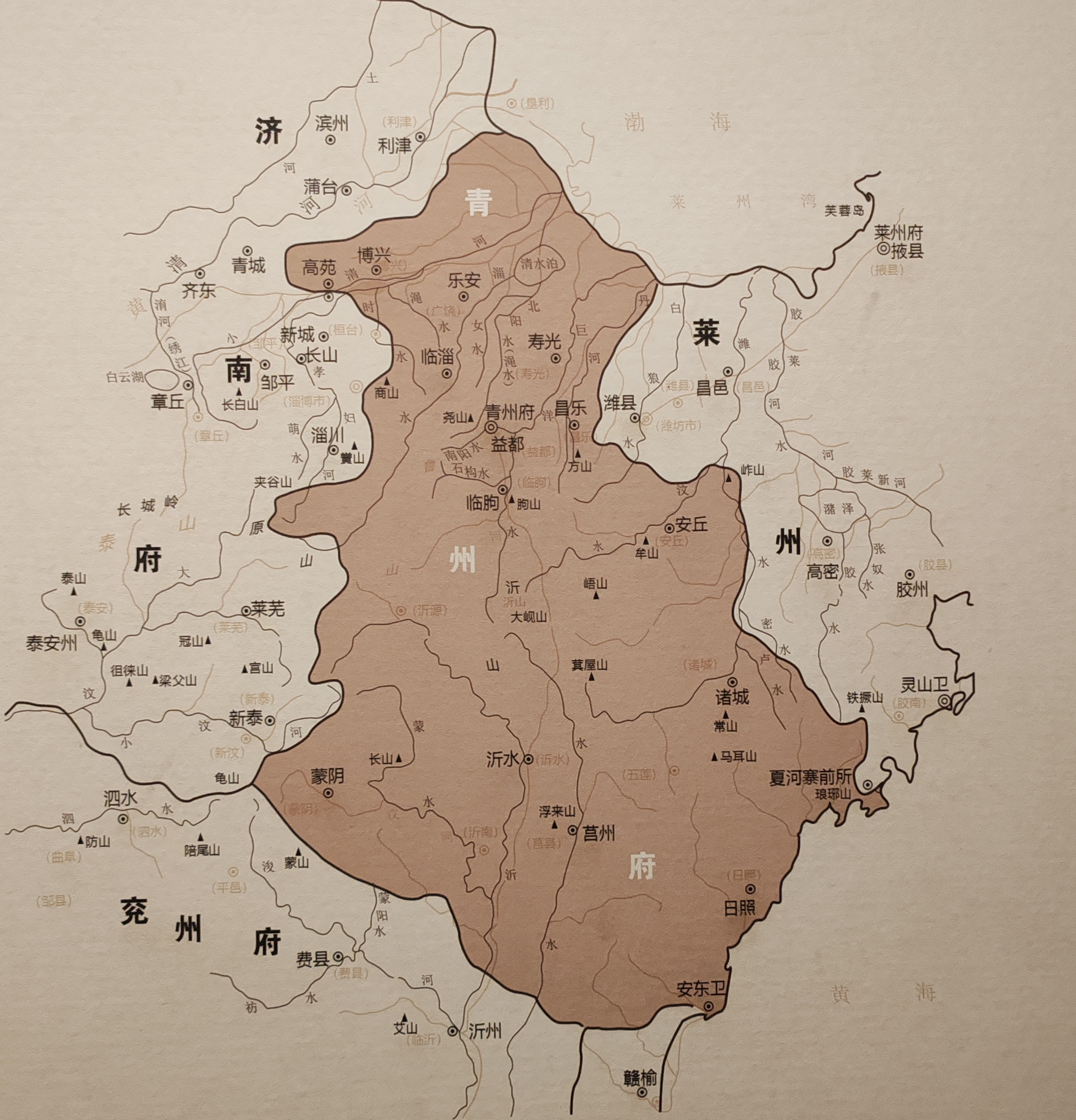
Map of Qīng Prefecture

Qingzhou or Qing Prefecture was a zhou (prefecture) in imperial China, originally centered on modern Linzi, and then moved to modern Qingzhou in the Jin dynasty (266–420). It existed (intermittently) from 596 to 1125.

Qing Prefecture was named after Qing Province, one of the Nine Provinces of ancient China. The modern city of Qingzhou retains its name.

== Geography ==
The administrative region of Qingzhou in the Tang dynasty is in modern northern Shandong. It probably includes parts of modern:

- Under the administration of Weifang:
  - Weifang
  - Qingzhou
  - Shouguang
  - Changyi
  - Linqu County
  - Changle County
- Under the administration of Dongying:
  - Guangrao County
- Under the administration of Binzhou:
  - Boxing County

== See also ==
- Qingzhou Prefecture
