= Daotian, Shandong =

Town in Shandong, China

Coordinates: 36°50′20″N 118°53′45″E

Daotian (Chinese: 稻田; pinyin: dàotián) is a town in Shouguang, Weifang, Shandong Province, China.
