= Yeyuan Subdistrict =

Yeyuan Subdistrict 冶源街道
- Subdistrict
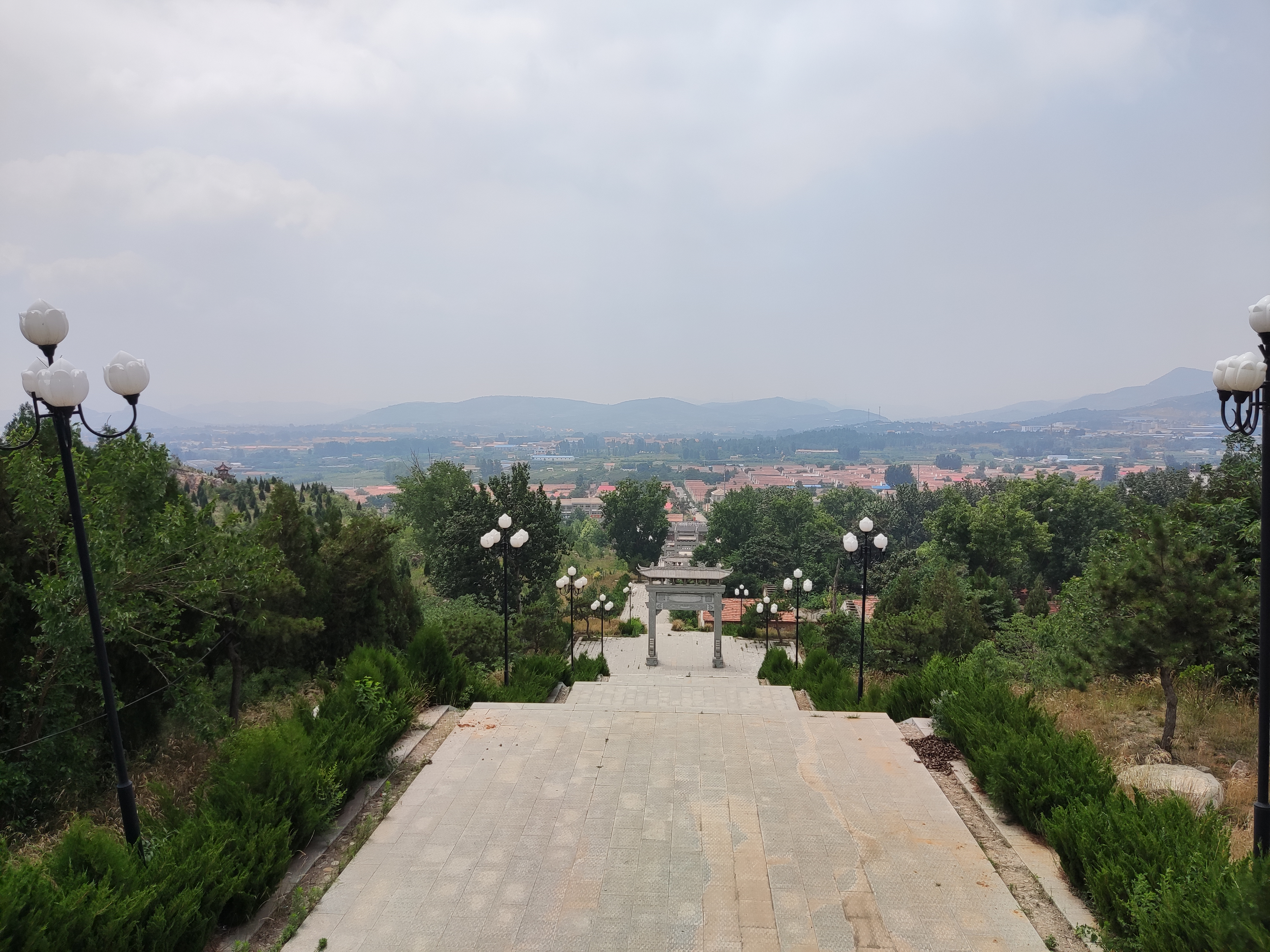
- Haifu Hill

- Location in Shandong
- Coordinates: 36°23′53″N 118°29′29″E
- Country: People's Republic of China
- Province: Shandong
- Prefecture-level city: Weifang
- County: Linqu County
- Time zone: UTC+8 (China Standard)

Yeyuan Subdistrict (Chinese: 冶源街道; pinyin: Yěyuán Jiēdào) is a subdistrict in Linqu County, Weifang, Shandong province, China. As of 2020, it administers the following 39 villages:

- Chijiazhuang Village (迟家庄村)
- Gongjiapo Village (宫家坡村)
- Hongxin Village (红新村)
- Yenan Village (冶南村)
- Yexi Village (冶西村)
- Yebei Village (冶北村)
- Wazi Village (洼子村)
- Hongguang Village (红光村)
- Fujializhao Village (傅家李召村)
- Xuejiamiao Village (薛家庙村)
- Wangshe Village (王舍村)
- Laoyagu Village (老崖崮村)
- Beiyangshan Village (北杨善村)
- Shihe Village (石河村)
- Gongjiaqiao Village (巩家桥村)
- Fushanji Village (福山集村)
- Dadian Village (大店村)
- Tanjiaxiaocui Village (谭家小崔村)
- Zhaojialou Village (赵家楼村)
- Daxinzhuang Village (大辛庄村)
- Sunjiaxiaocui Village (孙家小崔村)
- Panjiabu Village (潘家埠村)
- Nanyangshan Village (南杨善村)
- Yangshanji Village (杨善集村)
- Zhuyang Village (朱阳村)
- Beiguangyao Village (北广尧村)
- Shuangying Village (双营村)
- Nanguangyao Village (南广尧村)
- Huangjiazhai Village (黄家宅村)
- Baofuling Village (豹伏岭村)
- Shiwanya Village (石湾崖村)
- Ping'anyu Village (平安峪村)
- Mishan Village (米山村)
- Lijiazhuangzi Village (李家庄子村)
- Baita Village (白塔村)
- Songzhuang Village (宋庄村)
- Henan Village (河南村)
- Jieshou Village (界首村)
- Shihedian Village (石河店村)

== See also ==
- List of township-level divisions of Shandong
