= Sitou, Shandong =

Sitou 寺头镇
- Town
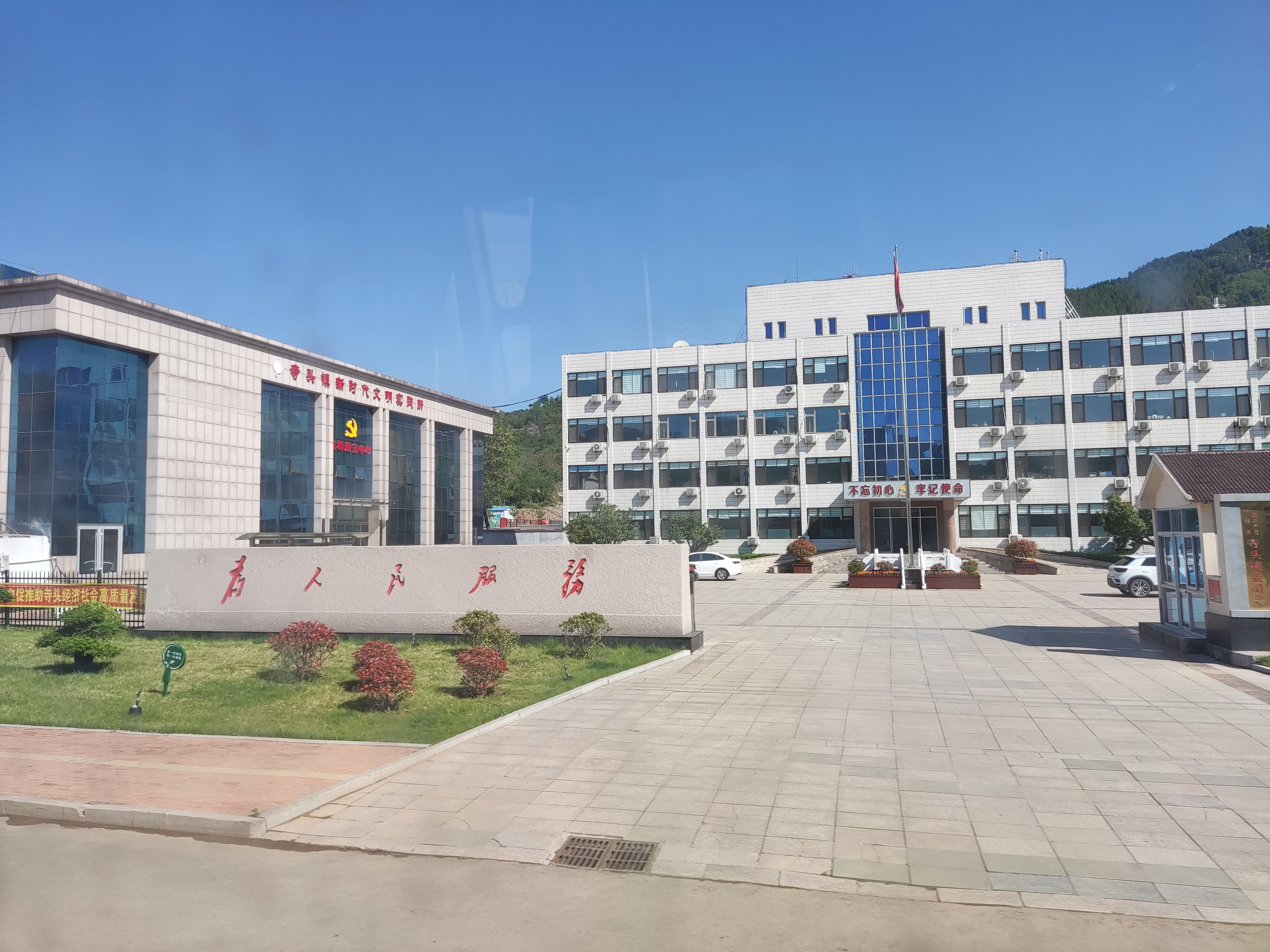
- Government of Sitou Town

- Location in Shandong
- Coordinates: 36°18′49″N 118°24′26″E
- Country: People's Republic of China
- Province: Shandong
- Prefecture-level city: Weifang
- County: Linqu County
- Time zone: UTC+8 (China Standard)

Sitou (Chinese: 寺头; pinyin: Sìtóu) is a town in Linqu County, Weifang, in Shandong province, China. As of 2020, it administers the following 34 villages:

- Sitou Village
- Gongjiazhuang Village (宫家庄村)
- Sunjiazhuang Village (孙家庄村)
- Dangu Village (丹崮村)
- Fuquan Village (福泉村)
- Qingya Village (青崖村)
- Dongyu Village (东峪村)
- Lüxia Village (吕匣村)
- Jizishan Village (箕子山村)
- Yutubu Village (玉兔埠村)
- Luozhuang Village (洛庄村)
- Xintai Village (新台村)
- Tumen Village (土门村)
- Wangzhuang Village (王庄村)
- Yangliuzhai Village (杨柳寨村)
- Hekou Village (河口村)
- Jijiazhuang Village (季家庄村)
- Yangzhuang Village (杨庄村)
- Hezhuang Village (河庄村)
- Shifo Village (石佛村)
- Nanxi'an Village (南西安村)
- Taohua Village (桃花村)
- Huangshan Village (黄山村)
- Gushan Village (崮山村)
- Ruizhuang Village (瑞庄村)
- Qiaogou Village (桥沟村)
- Lugao Village (鹿皋村)
- Shijiahe Village (石家河村)
- Yujiazhuang Village (于家庄村)
- Zhangjiazhuang Village (张家庄村)
- Dagudong Village (大崮东村)
- Mianguqian Village (冕崮前村)
- Liuzi Village (柳子村)
- Laozhuangzi Village (老庄子村)
