= Qingzhou Township =

Township in Sichuan, China

Coordinates: 29.8023°N 103.7086°E

Qingzhou (青州乡) is a township in Jiajiang County, Sichuan, China.

== See also ==
- List of township-level divisions of Sichuan
