= Linqu County =

Linqu County 临朐县 Linchu; Linchü; Pianyi; Zhuxu County
- County
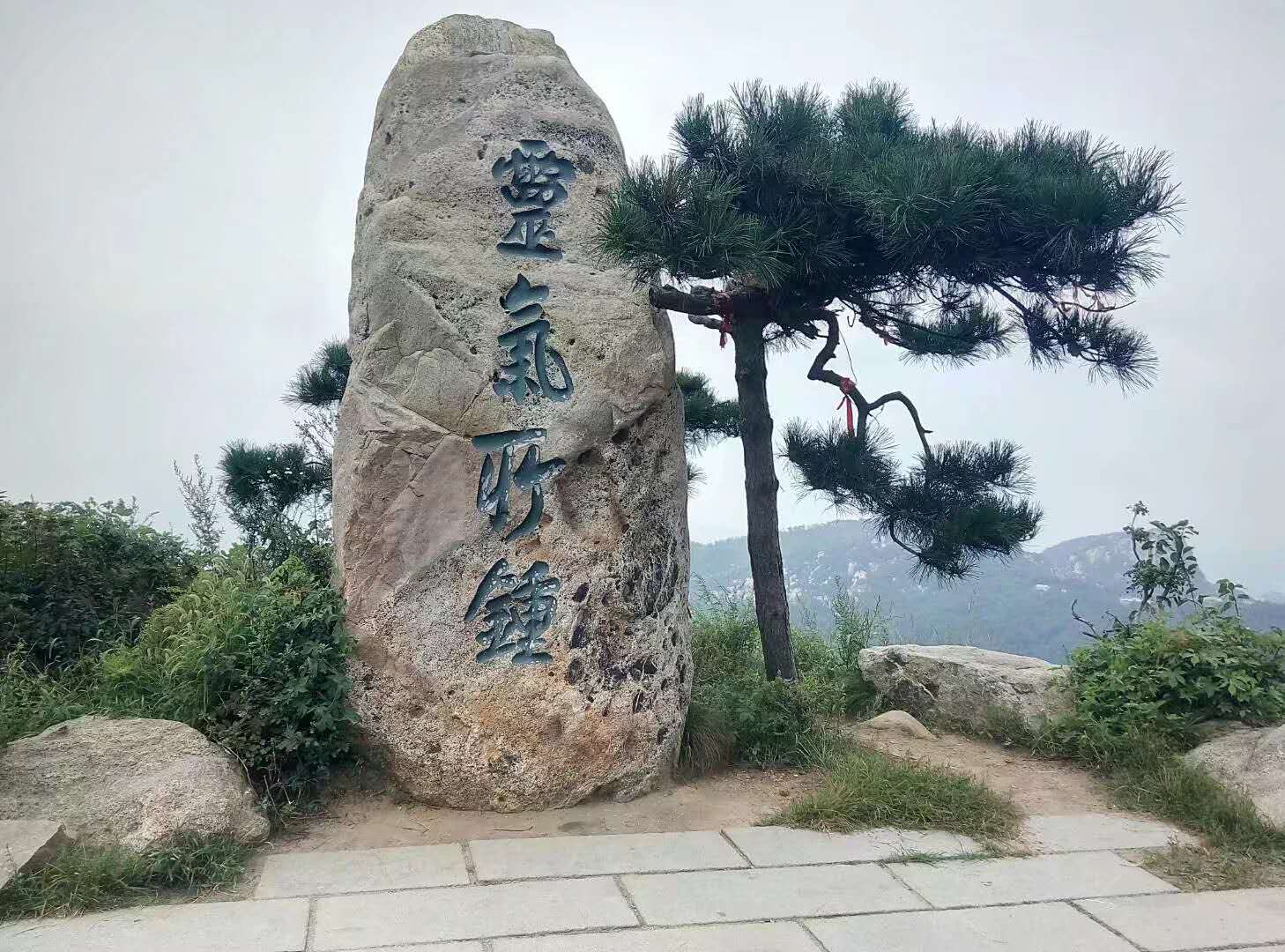
- Gathering the spirit and the qi

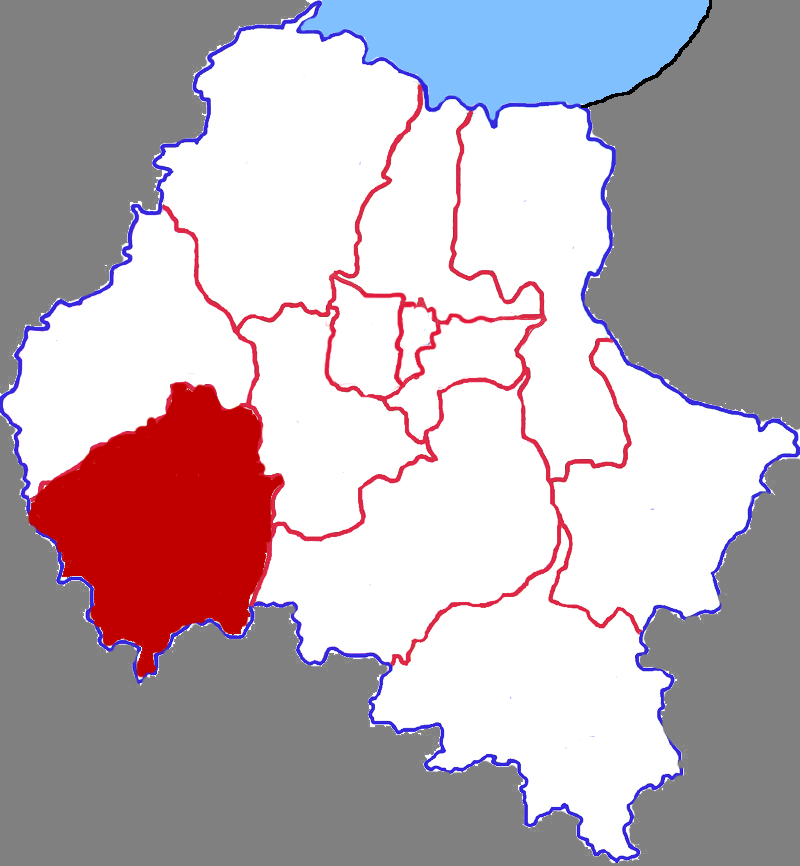
- Location of the seat in Weifang

- Location of the seat in Shandong
- Coordinates: 36°30′44″N 118°32′32″E
- Country: People's Republic of China
- Province: Shandong
- Prefecture-level city: Weifang

Area
  - Total: 1,831 km^{2} (707 sq mi)

Population (2018)
  - Total: 925,567
  - Density: 505.5/km^{2} (1,309/sq mi)
- Time zone: UTC+8 (China Standard)
- Postal code: 262600, 262699
- Website: www.linqu.gov.cn

Linqu County (simplified Chinese: 临朐县; traditional Chinese: 臨朐縣; pinyin: Línqú Xiàn) is a county, originally known as "Pianyi", located in the southwest of Weifang in the middle of Shandong Peninsula, Shandong Province, China. Linqu is also known as Zhuxu County (simplified Chinese: 朱虚县; traditional Chinese: 朱虛縣; pinyin: Zhūxū Xiàn). It covers an area of 1,834 km^{2} (708 sq mi) and governs 937 villages which were grouped into eight townships and two subdistricts. Linqu has a population of 926 thousand (2020).

With a long history of over 2000 years since its establishment in the Western Han dynasty, Linqu is well known for its beautiful scenery and rich cultures, such as traditional operas, brush paintings and calligraphy, rare rock arts, Mount Yi National Forest Park, Shanwang National Geography Park, Old Dragon Spring and Shimenfang Park. Its over 210 archeology sites include Dawenkou culture and Longshan culture relics.

== History ==
=== Early history ===
Among the various Neolithic sites in Linqu, the Xizhufeng site (Chinese: 西朱封遗址; pinyin: Xīzhūfēng yízhǐ), the Weijiazhuang site (魏家庄遗址; Wèijiāzhuāng yízhǐ), the Yaowa site (尧洼遗址; Yáowā yízhǐ) and the Ganjiagou site (敢家沟遗址; Gǎnjiāgōu yízhǐ) exemplify the transition from Dawenkou culture to Longshan culture and further into Yueshi culture and beyond. Pottery, human and animal bones, ding feet, as well as jade artefacts, have all been unearthed.

According to the Bamboo Annals, the Yellow Emperor is said to have performed a form of imperial fengshan ceremony on Yishan, while Dan Zhu, son of Emperor Yao, was enfeoffed at the River Dan (Chinese: 丹水), now the River Mi. During the Xia and Shang dynasties, the area was associated with the feudal lord Ji Ce (季荝; 季萴; Jì Cè) and the fiefdom of the feudal lord Pang Boling (逄伯陵; Páng Bólíng) respectively.

In the Western Zhou dynasty, Linqu was known as Pianyi (骈邑; 駢邑; Pián Yì) and was originally part of the state of Ji (紀國; 纪国; Jì Guó). Following the state's conquest by the state of Qi in the Spring and Autumn period, the settlement became Quyi (朐邑; Qú Yì) in the Warring States period, whence the basis for the modern name. The Great Wall of Qi, the earliest so-called in China, can be seen in Daguan (大关; 大關; Dàguān), now part of Yishan Town.

=== Imperial history ===
After the unification of China under the Qin dynasty, the territory was divided between Qi Commandery and Langya Commandery. In the Western Han dynasty, the area contained three counties: Linqu, Zhuxu, and Jiao (Chinese: 挍; pinyin: Jiāo), as well as two marquisates, Ping (Chinese: 缾; pinyin: Píng) and Linyuan (临原; 臨原; Línyuán). During the Eastern Han dynasty, the territory was administered through two counties, Linqu and Zhuxu, both belonging to Qingzhou (青州; Qīngzhōu).

During the Wei and Jin periods of the Three Kingdoms era, Linqu and Zhuxu continued to exist as separate counties. The city was the site of the Battle of Linqu in 409, during the unrest of the Sixteen Kingdoms period. During the Northern and Southern dynasties, five counties were established within the present-day territory: Changguo, Zhuxu, Banyang, Xi'an, and Anping. These administrative divisions were eventually consolidated into Linqu County during the Sui dynasty.

During the Tang and Song dynasties, Linqu belonged to Qingzhou. Under the Yuan dynasty, it was administered by Yidu Circuit (Chinese: 益都路; pinyin: Yìdū Lù). During the Ming and Qing dynasties, it belonged to Qingzhou Prefecture.

=== Modern history ===
Following the establishment of the Republic of China, the prefectural system was abolished and replaced by a circuit system under the Beiyang government. Linqu County initially belonged to Jiaodong Circuit (simplified Chinese: 胶东道; traditional Chinese: 膠東道; pinyin: Jiāodōng Dào), and was transferred to Ziqing Circuit (Chinese: 淄青道; pinyin: Zīqīng Dào) in 1925. In 1928, the circuit system was abolished under the Nationalist government, and Linqu came under the direct administration of Shandong Province.

Upon the establishment of the People's Republic of China, Linqu was transferred to Changwei Special District. Subsequently renamed Changwei Region in 1967 and then Weifang Region in 1981, in October 1983, Weifang Region was reorganized as Weifang City, under whose administration Linqu County remains.

==== Public health ====
Linqu County has historically been one of the areas with the highest incidence and mortality rates of gastric cancer in China. A nationwide survey of cancer mortality conducted in 1973–1975 recorded age-standardised gastric cancer mortality rates of 70 per 100,000 among men and 25 per 100,000 among women, with gastric cancer accounting for approximately 42% of all cancer deaths in the county. Since 1983, researchers from Peking University Cancer Hospital and other institutions have conducted long-running epidemiological investigations in the county, examining dietary and environmental risk factors, Helicobacter pylori infection, genetic susceptibility and the progression of precancerous gastric lesions. The research has contributed to the international understanding of gastric carcinogenesis and has generated more than 250 scientific publications.

In 1995, the Shandong Intervention Trial was initiated to investigate whether treatment of H. pylori infection and nutritional supplementation could reduce the development of gastric cancer. A subsequent large community-based intervention trial, launched in 2011, enrolled more than 180,000 residents from 980 villages to evaluate the effectiveness of population-based H. pylori treatment. This study found a modest reduction in gastric cancer incidence among individuals receiving the treatment for H. pylori in intention-to-treat analyses. Linqu also became one of the pilot locations for China's government-supported rural cancer screening initiatives, introduced in the 2000s.

== Geography ==
There are many mountains in the county, such as Mountain Yi and Mountain Song. The River Mi originates in the foothills of Mountain Yi, and is the main source of irrigation in the county. The Yeyuan Reservoir in the upper reaches of the River Mi is the largest water storage area in the county, with the reservoir capacity ranking among the top ten.

=== Climate ===
Climate data for Linqu, elevation 150 m (490 ft), (1991–2020 normals, extremes 1981–2010)
Month	Jan	Feb	Mar	Apr	May	Jun	Jul	Aug	Sep	Oct	Nov	Dec	Year
Record high °C (°F)	18.1 (64.6)	25.4 (77.7)	31.7 (89.1)	34.6 (94.3)	38.3 (100.9)	40.5 (104.9)	39.8 (103.6)	37.7 (99.9)	39.1 (102.4)	36.6 (97.9)	27.1 (80.8)	21.5 (70.7)	40.5 (104.9)
Mean daily maximum °C (°F)	3.8 (38.8)	7.5 (45.5)	14.0 (57.2)	21.0 (69.8)	26.5 (79.7)	30.6 (87.1)	31.6 (88.9)	30.1 (86.2)	26.8 (80.2)	21.0 (69.8)	13.0 (55.4)	5.9 (42.6)	19.3 (66.8)
Daily mean °C (°F)	−2.0 (28.4)	1.2 (34.2)	7.4 (45.3)	14.4 (57.9)	20.1 (68.2)	24.5 (76.1)	26.6 (79.9)	25.2 (77.4)	20.7 (69.3)	14.5 (58.1)	6.9 (44.4)	0.3 (32.5)	13.3 (56.0)
Mean daily minimum °C (°F)	−6.7 (19.9)	−3.8 (25.2)	1.7 (35.1)	8.3 (46.9)	13.9 (57.0)	19.1 (66.4)	22.4 (72.3)	21.2 (70.2)	15.7 (60.3)	9.2 (48.6)	2.0 (35.6)	−4.2 (24.4)	8.2 (46.8)
Record low °C (°F)	−20.9 (−5.6)	−18.6 (−1.5)	−12.4 (9.7)	−5.9 (21.4)	−0.5 (31.1)	7.0 (44.6)	12.0 (53.6)	10.9 (51.6)	4.3 (39.7)	−4.4 (24.1)	−14.5 (5.9)	−23.8 (−10.8)	−23.8 (−10.8)
Average precipitation mm (inches)	8.0 (0.31)	13.8 (0.54)	13.6 (0.54)	28.2 (1.11)	55.5 (2.19)	86.9 (3.42)	147.5 (5.81)	160.4 (6.31)	53.9 (2.12)	29.9 (1.18)	28.5 (1.12)	10.8 (0.43)	637 (25.08)
Average precipitation days (≥ 0.1 mm)	2.9	3.6	4.0	5.4	7.4	8.6	12.7	12.2	6.9	5.5	5.1	3.9	78.2
Average snowy days	4.3	3.6	1.5	0.1	0	0	0	0	0	0	0.9	2.8	13.2
Average relative humidity (%)	60	57	51	53	58	62	76	80	73	66	64	61	63
Mean monthly sunshine hours	166.3	171.0	220.3	239.5	263.1	229.1	201.6	197.8	200.5	197.9	167.3	164.9	2,419.3
Percentage possible sunshine	54	55	59	61	60	52	46	48	54	57	55	55	55
Source: China Meteorological Administration

== Administrative divisions ==
After the township merger in 2007, Linqu has jurisdiction over 2 subdistricts, 8 towns, and a high-tech industrial park.

Subdistricts

- Chengguan Subdistrict (城关街道)
- Dongcheng Subdistrict (东城街道)
- Yeyuan Subdistrict (冶源街道)
- Xinzhai Subdistrict (辛寨街道)

Towns

- Wujing (五井镇)
- Sitou (寺头镇)
- Jiushan (九山镇)
- Shanwang (山旺镇)
- Liushan (柳山镇)
- Yishan (沂山镇)

== Economy ==
The current economy is dominated by aluminum alloy and stainless steel building materials.

Linqu Qinchi Winery once bought CCTV prime-time advertisements at a high price of 320 million yuan, making it a re-election for the second term.

=== Linqu's GDP ===
Year	2019	2018	2017	2016	2015	2014	2013	2012	2011	2010	2009	2008
Billion	30.80	30.55	28.02	26.11	24.40	22.90	20.56	18.14	16.22	14.06	12.28	11.35

== Sightseeing ==
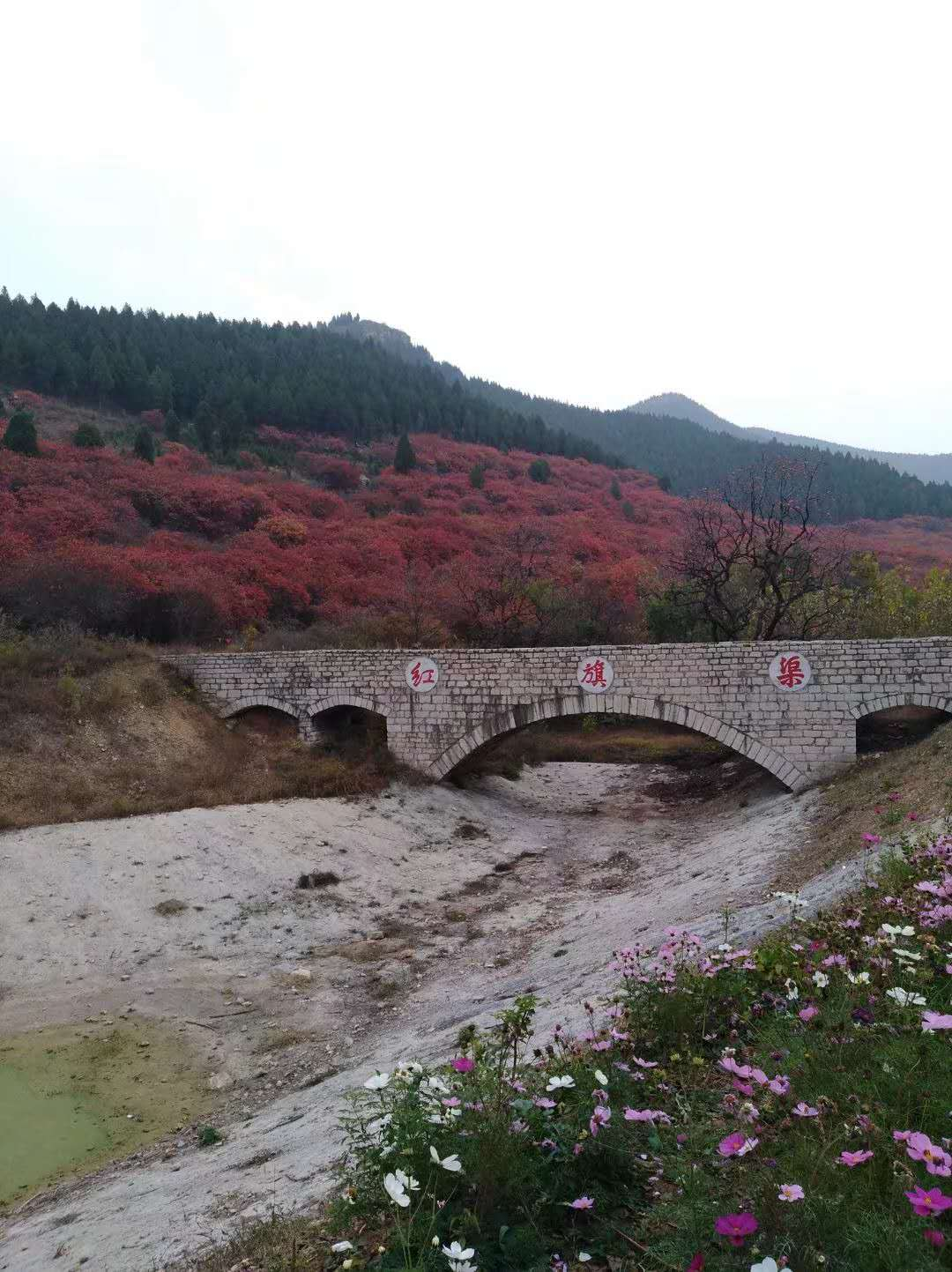
Hongqiqu (红旗渠)

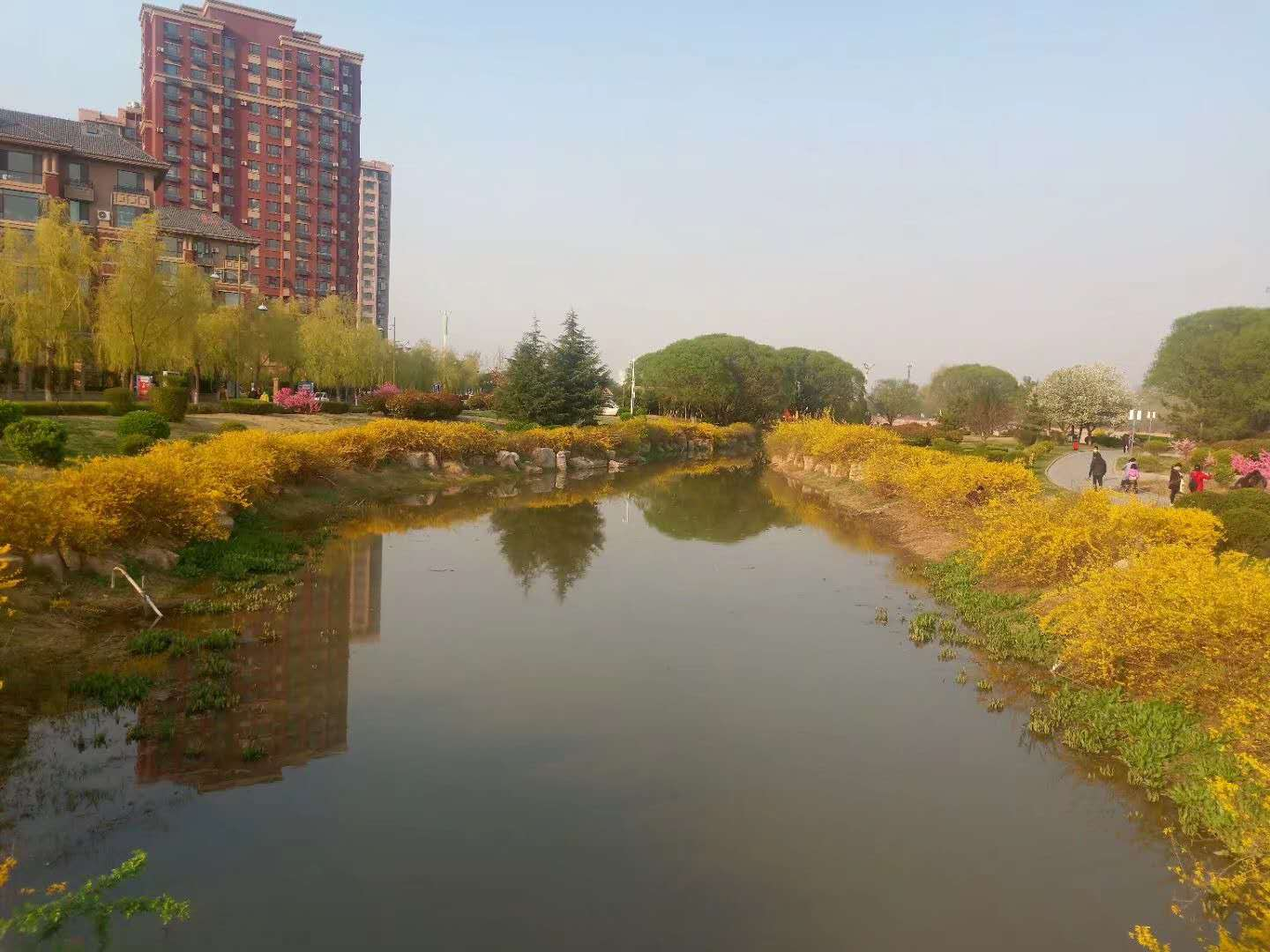
River Mi

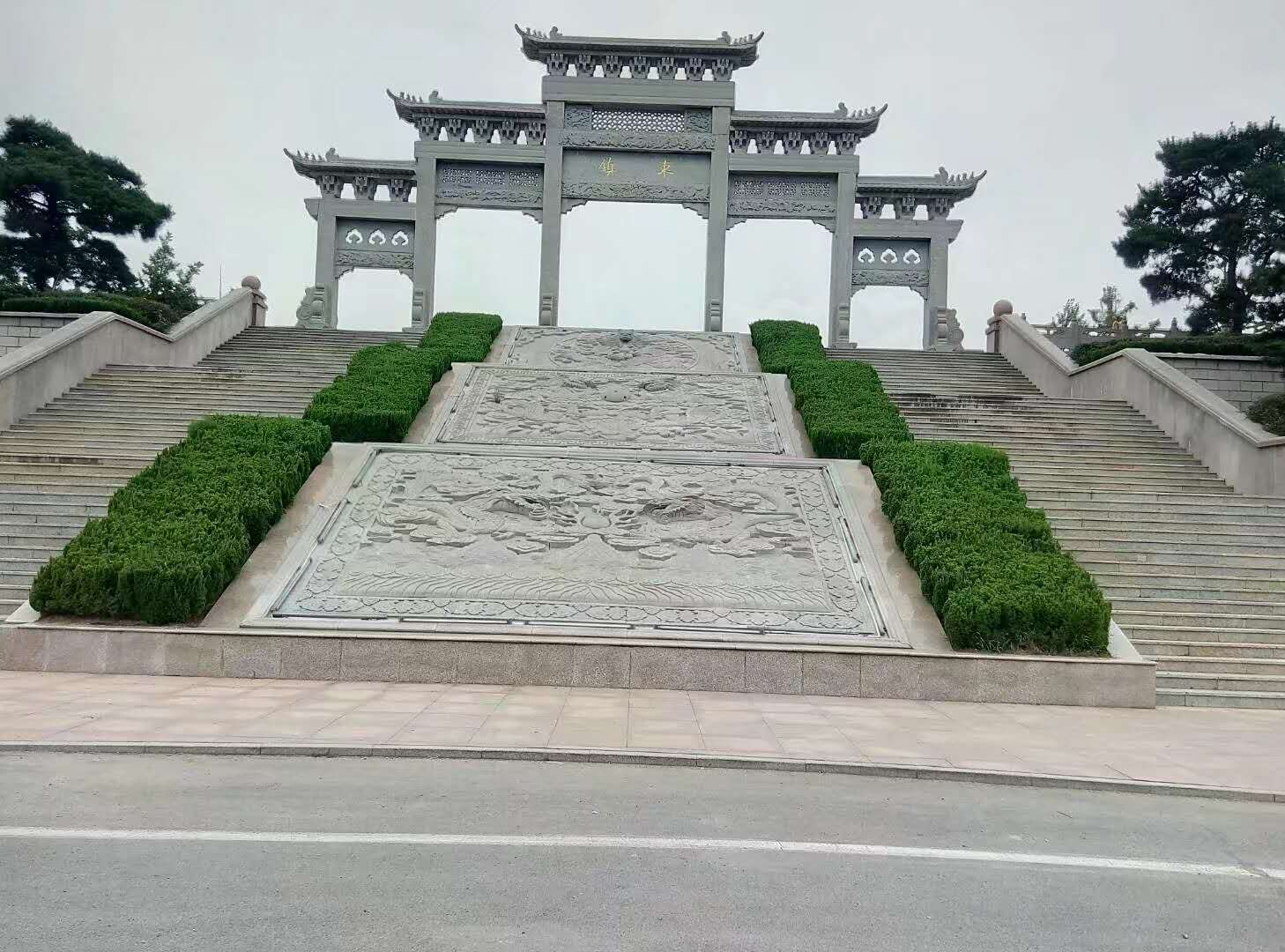
Mountain Yi Dongzhen (东镇)

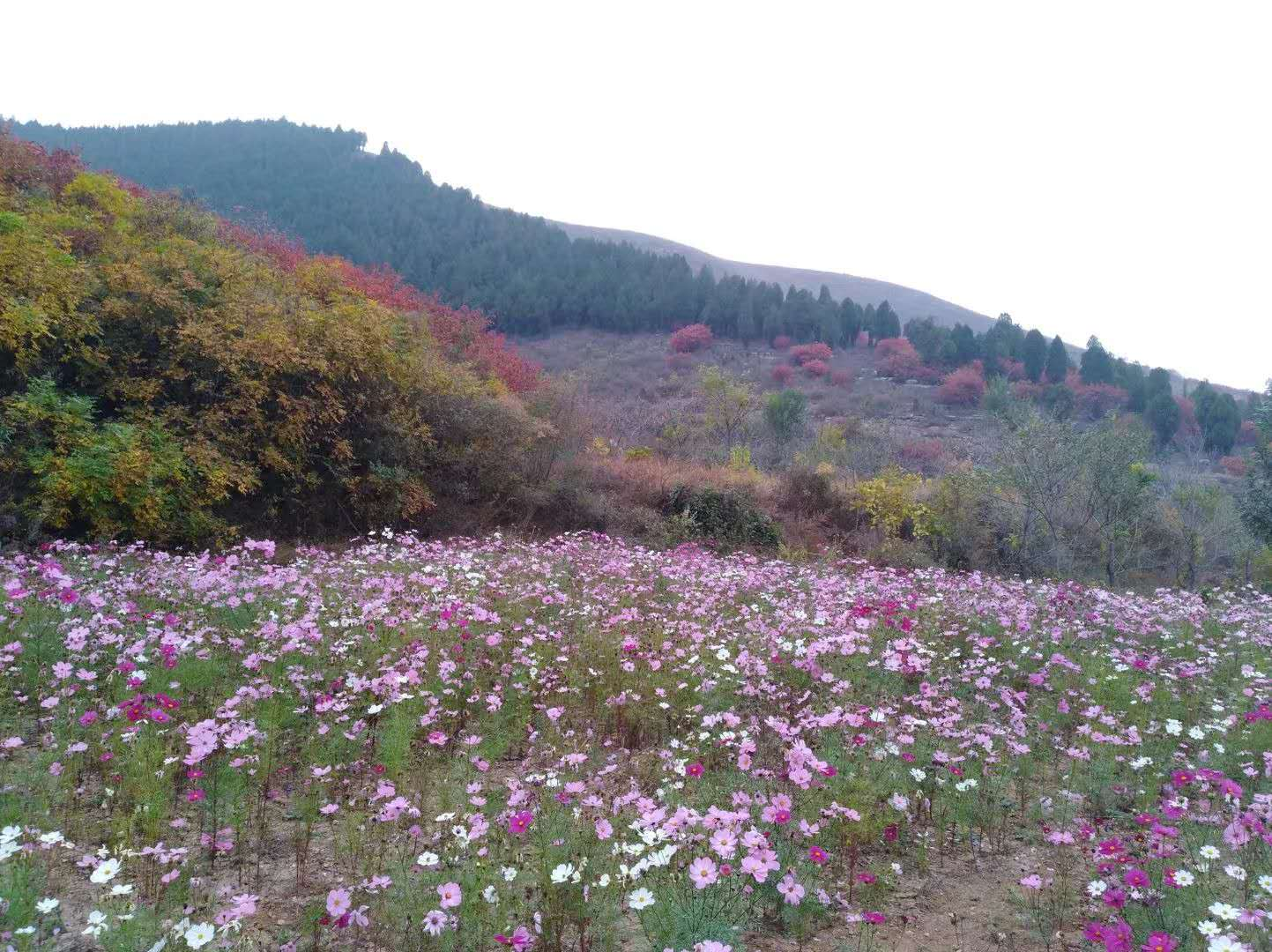
Guanhushan

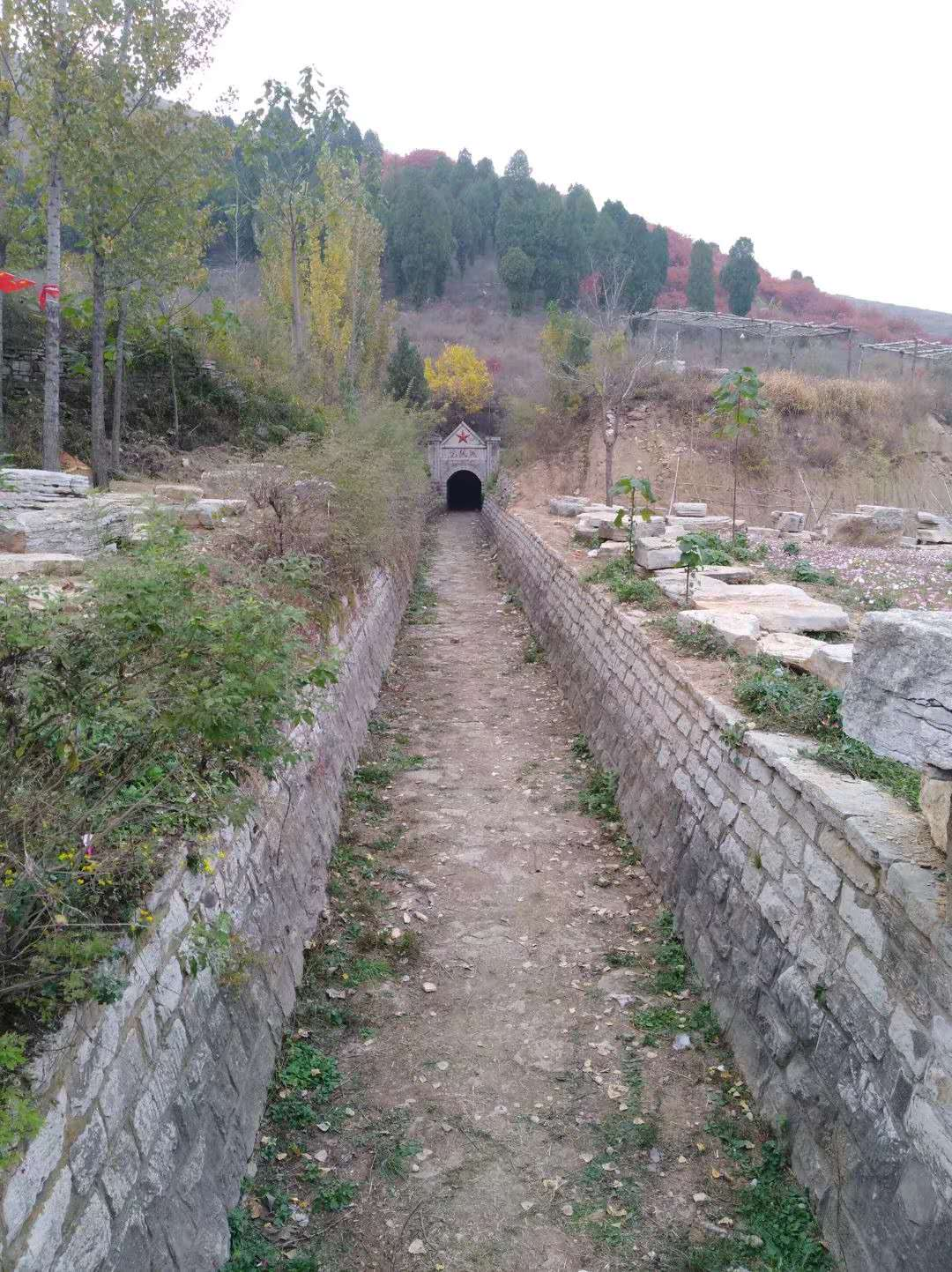
Hongqiqu

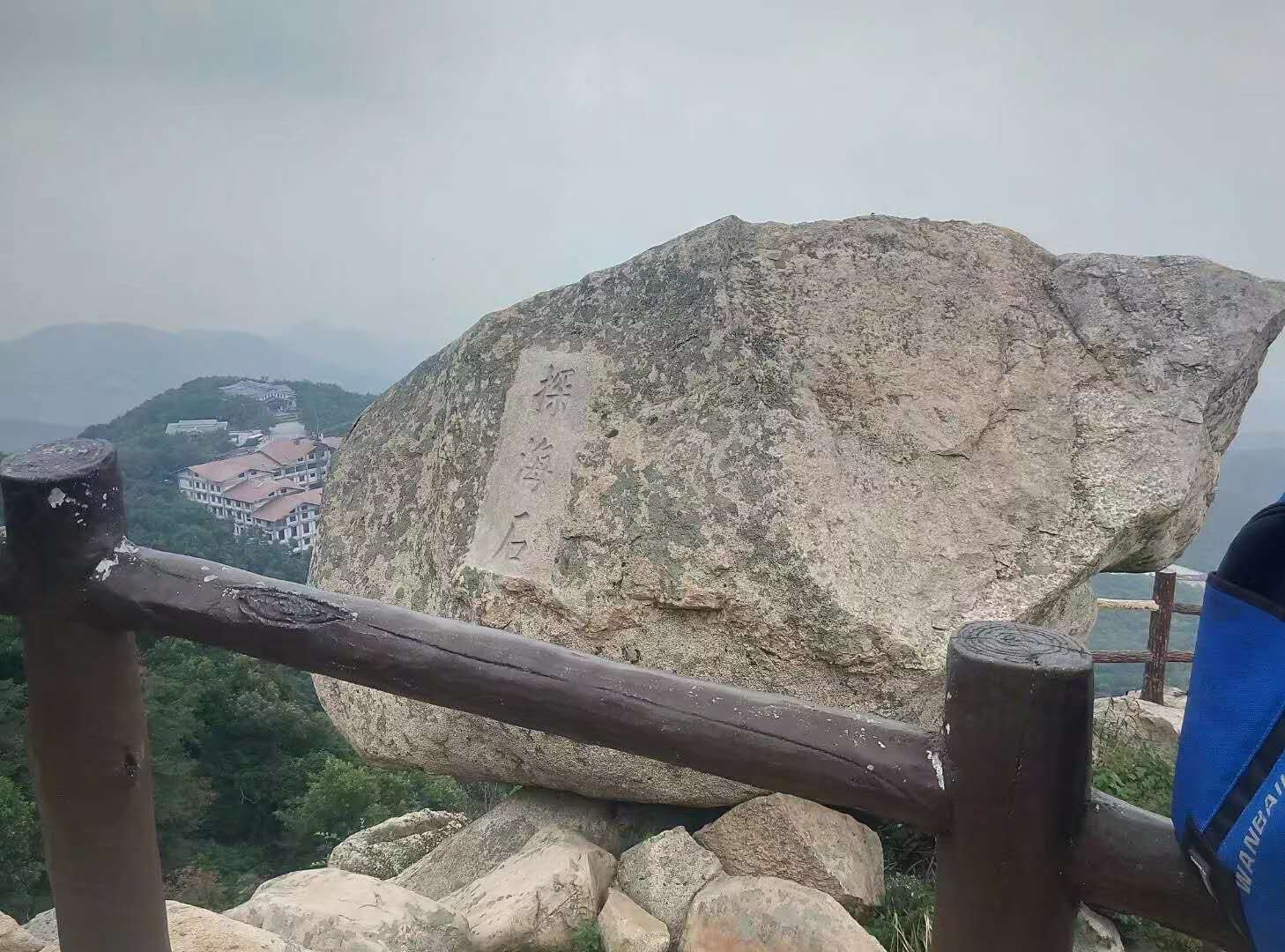
Mountain Yi Tanhaishi (探海石)

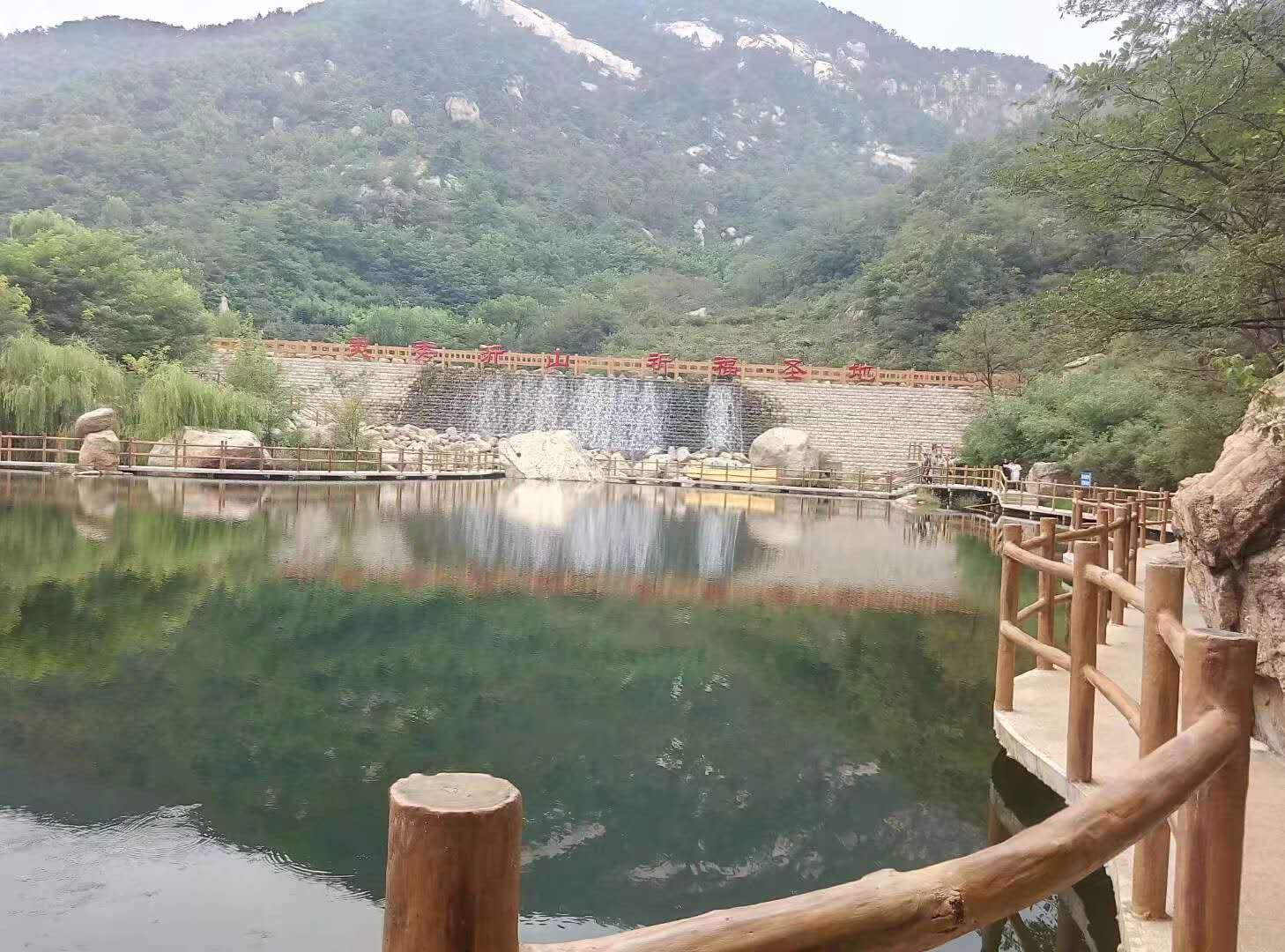
Mountain Yi Lake

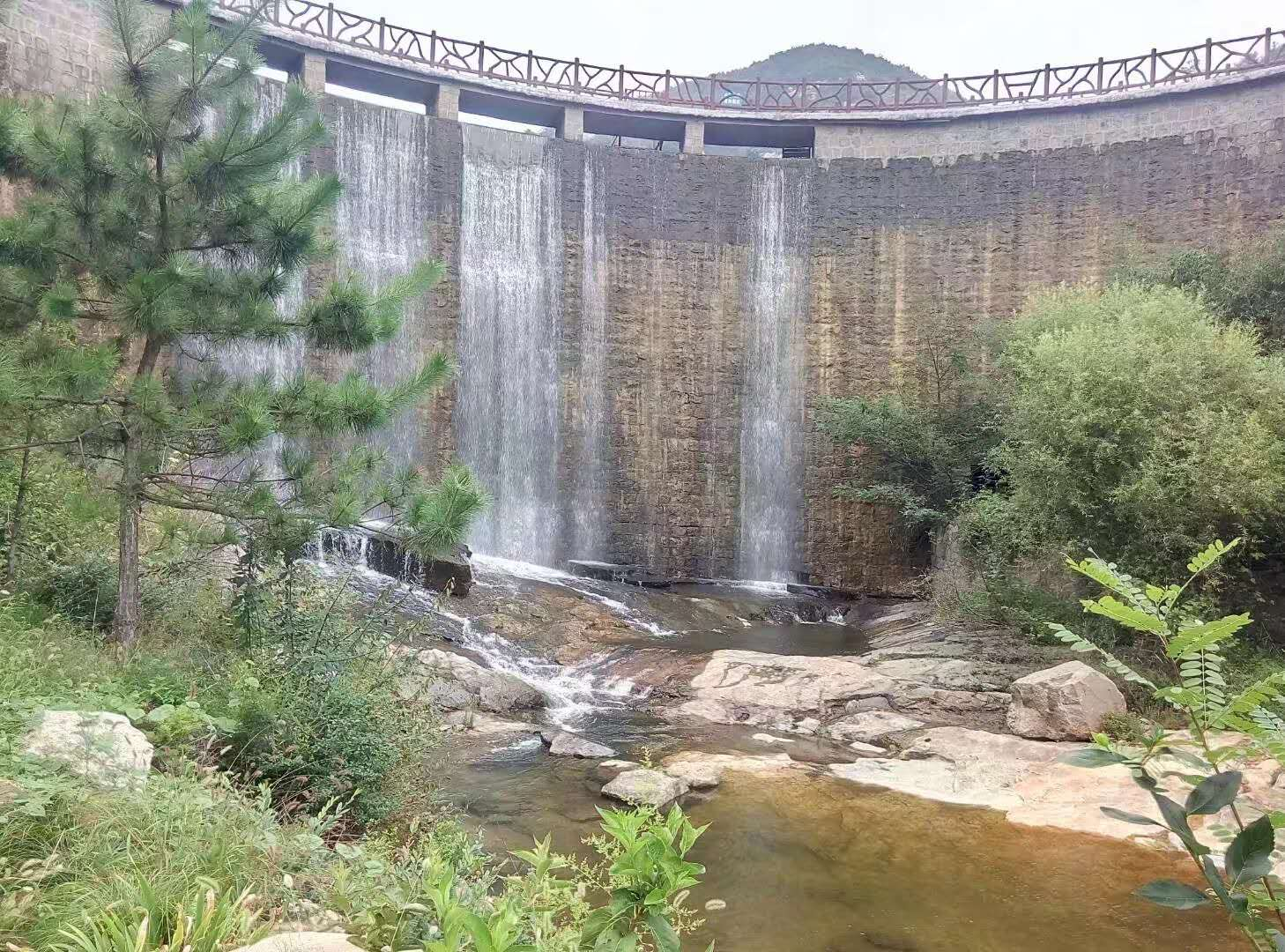
Mountain Yi Waterfall Wall

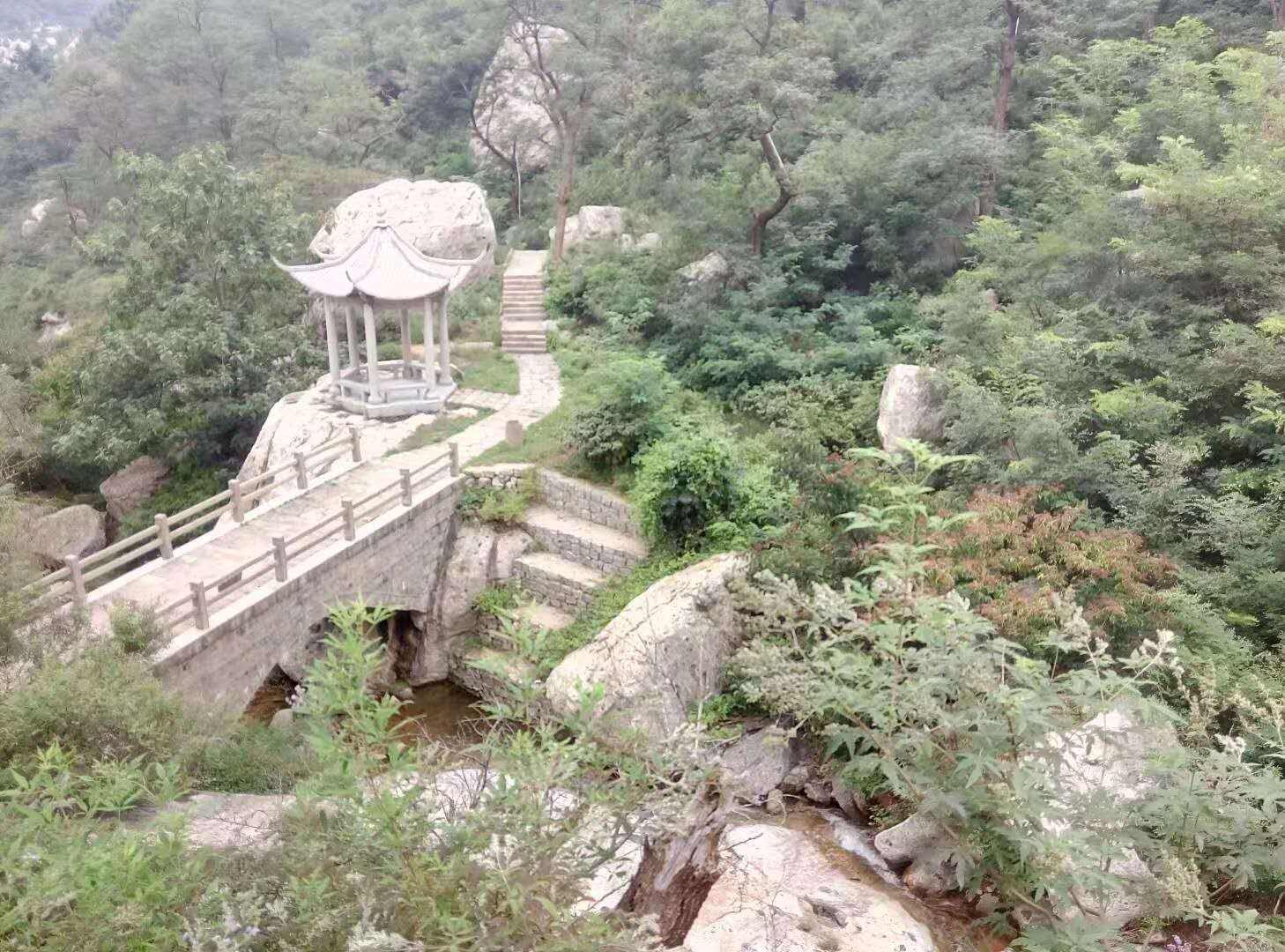
Mountain Yi from above

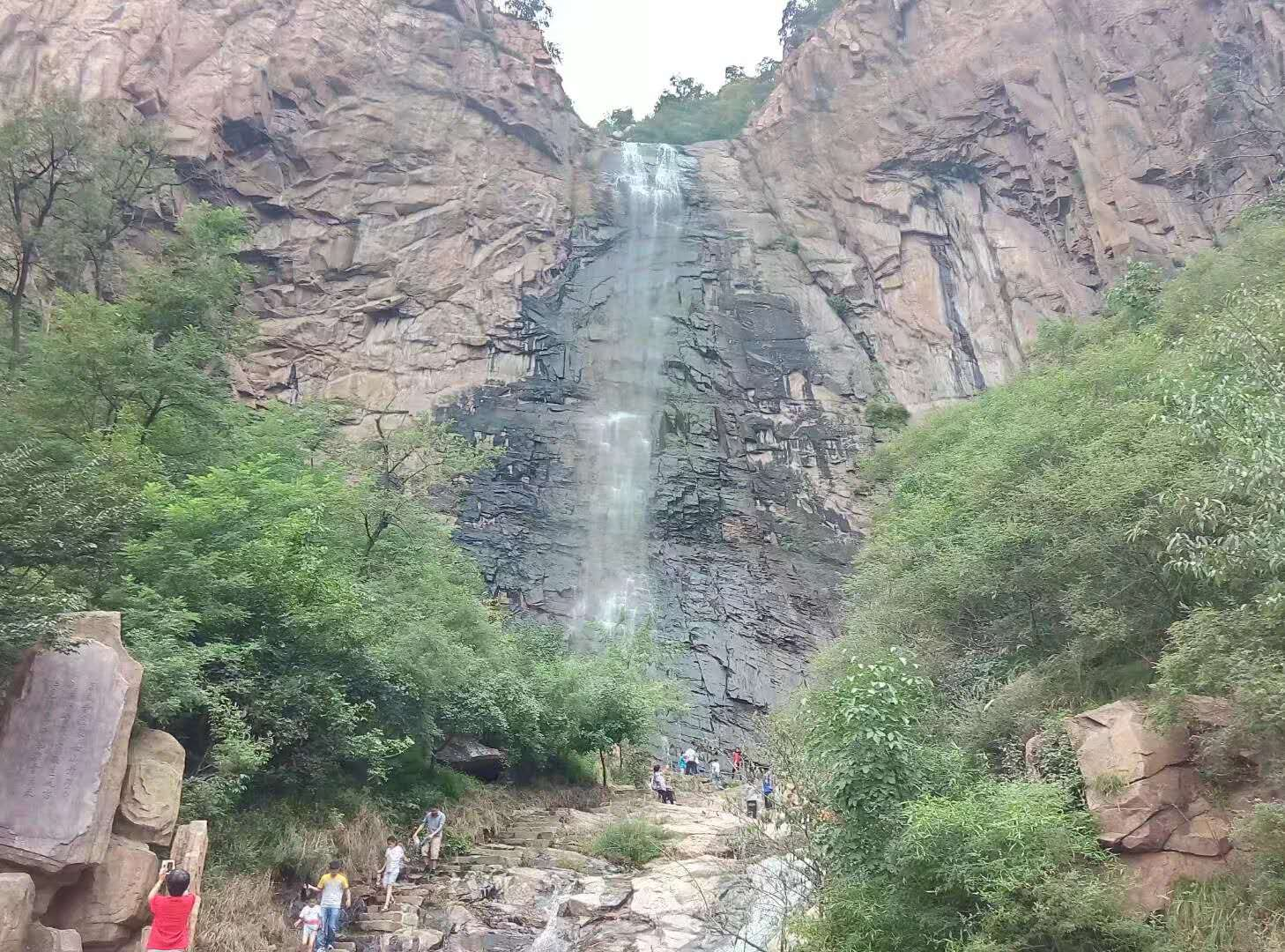
Mountain Yi Waterfall drop

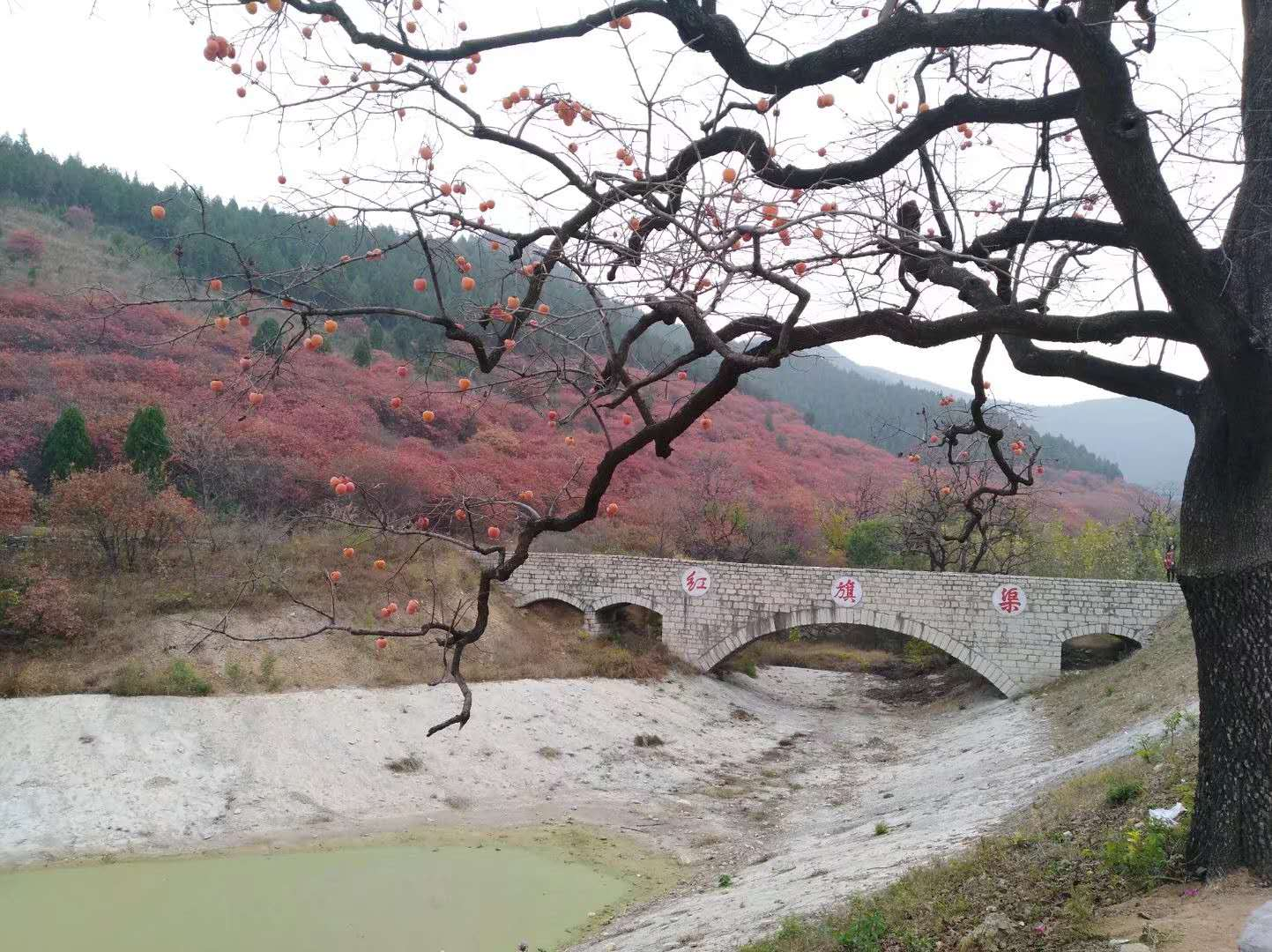
Mountain Yi Hongqiqu (红旗渠)

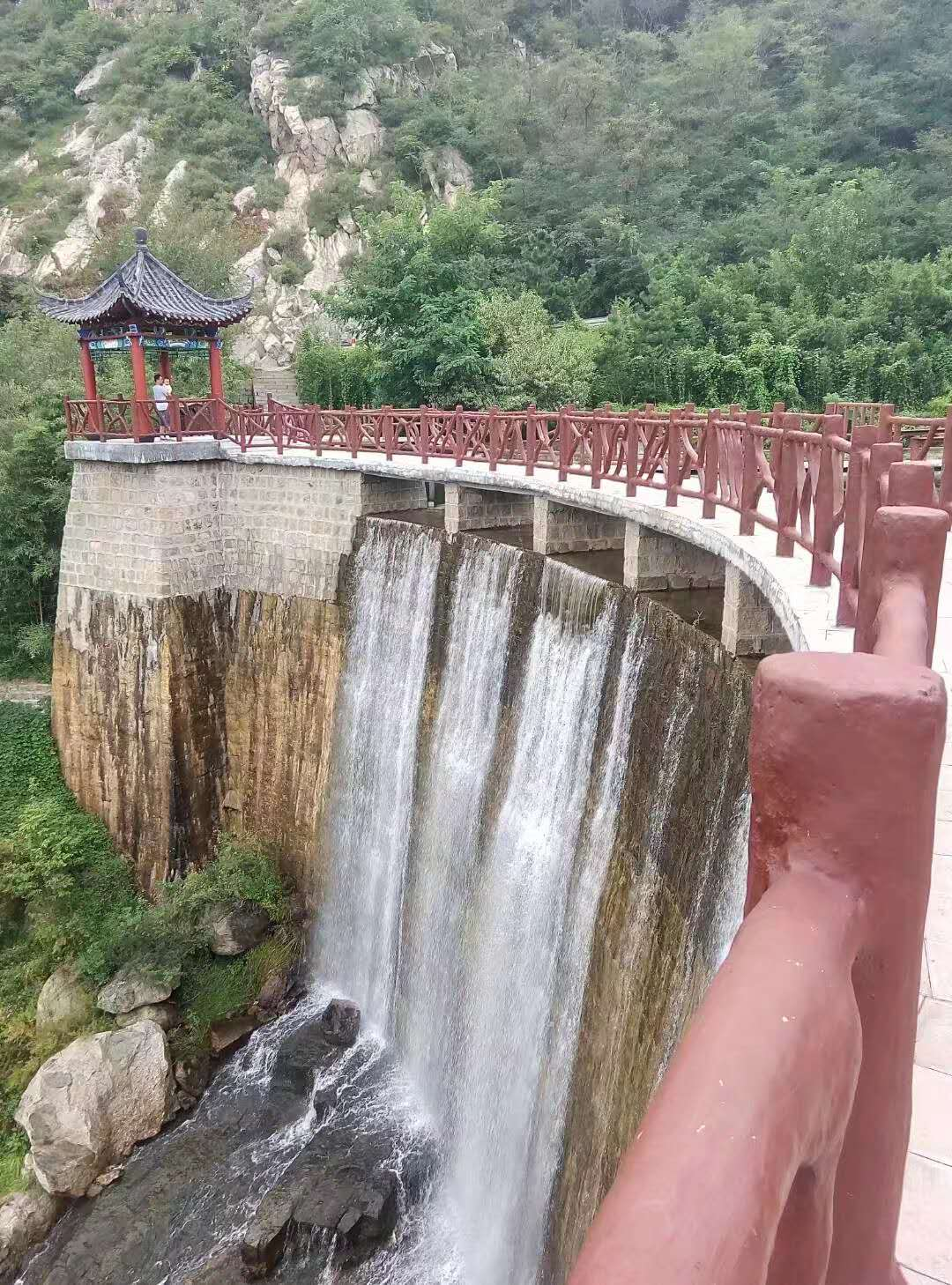
Mountain Yi Waterfall from above

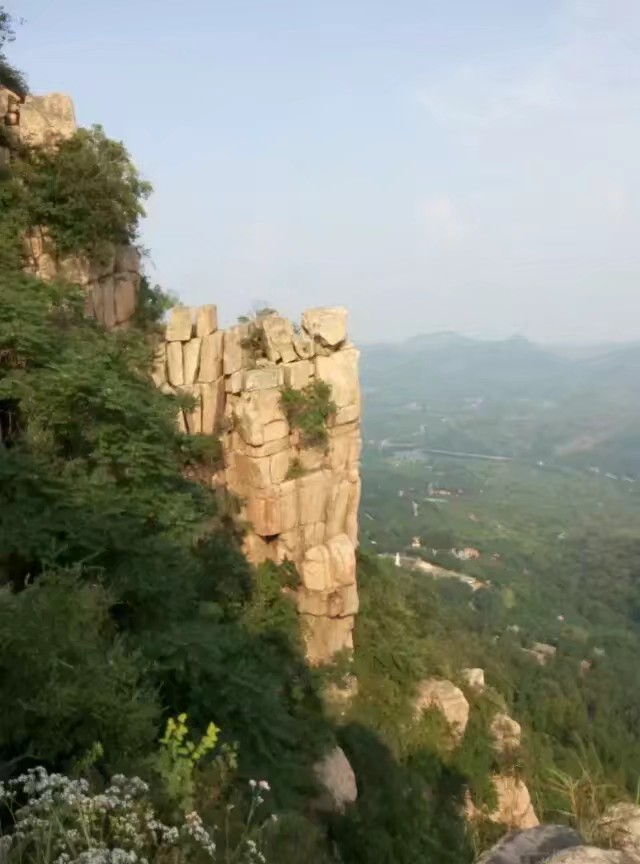
Mountain Yi edge from above

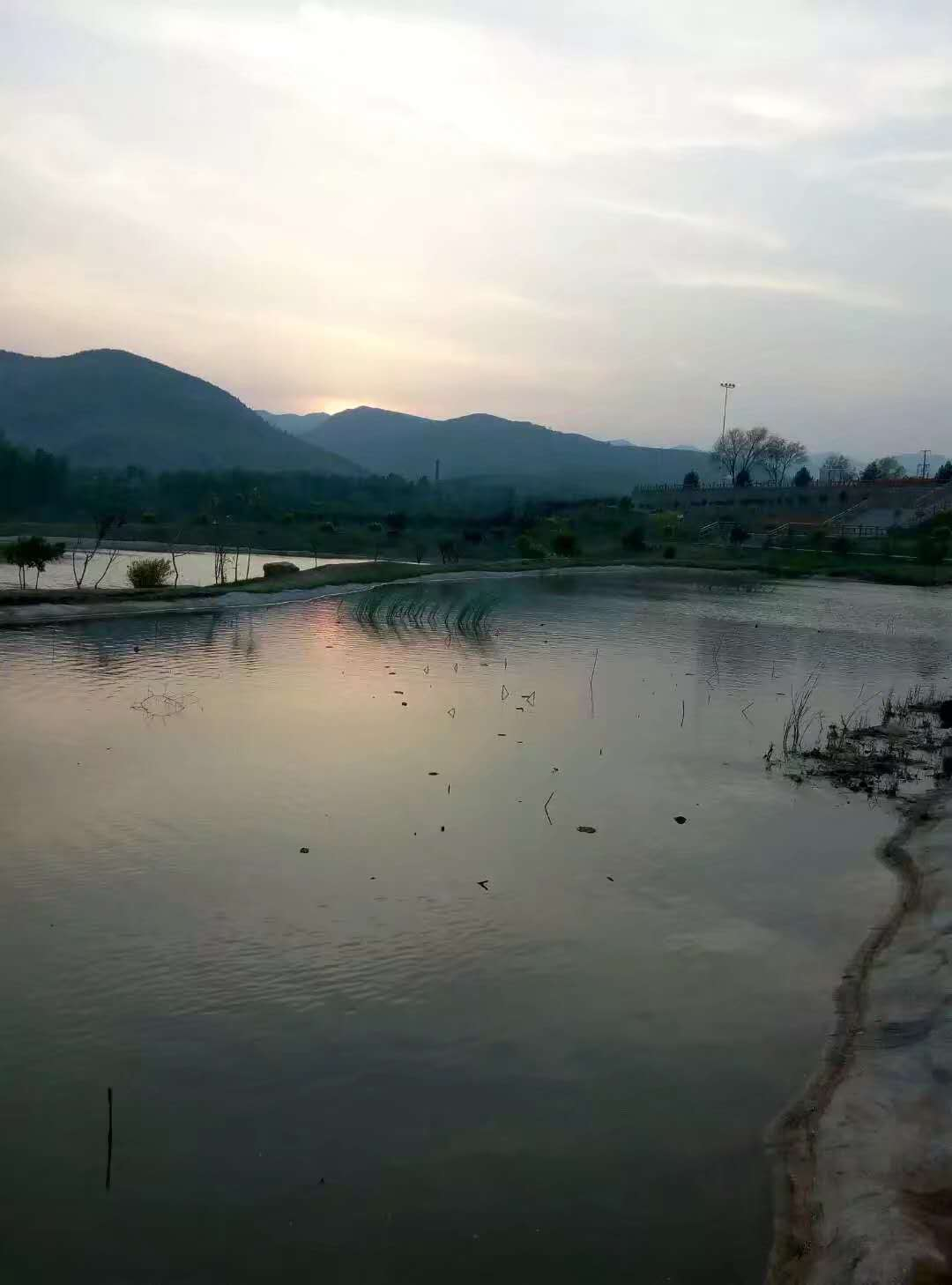
Mountain Yi lake

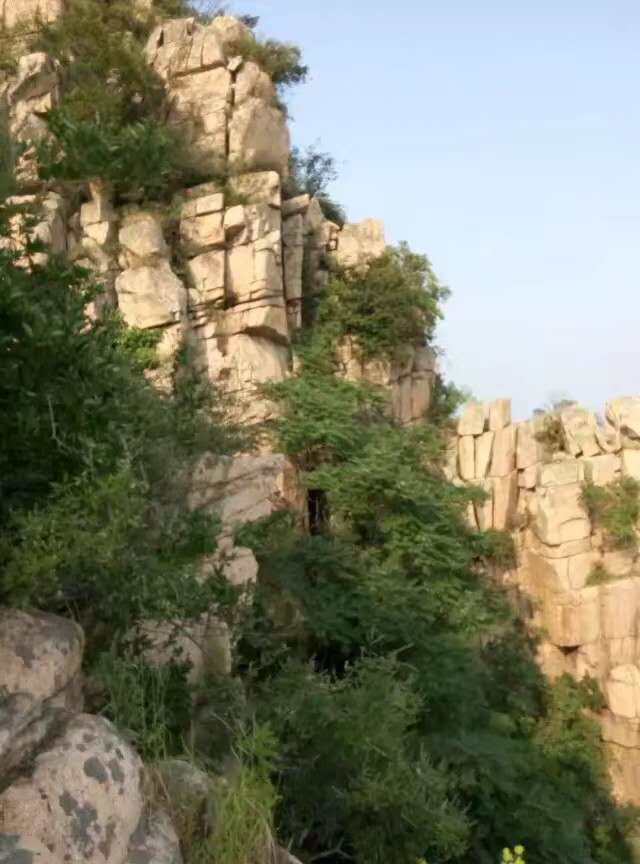
Mountain Yi edge

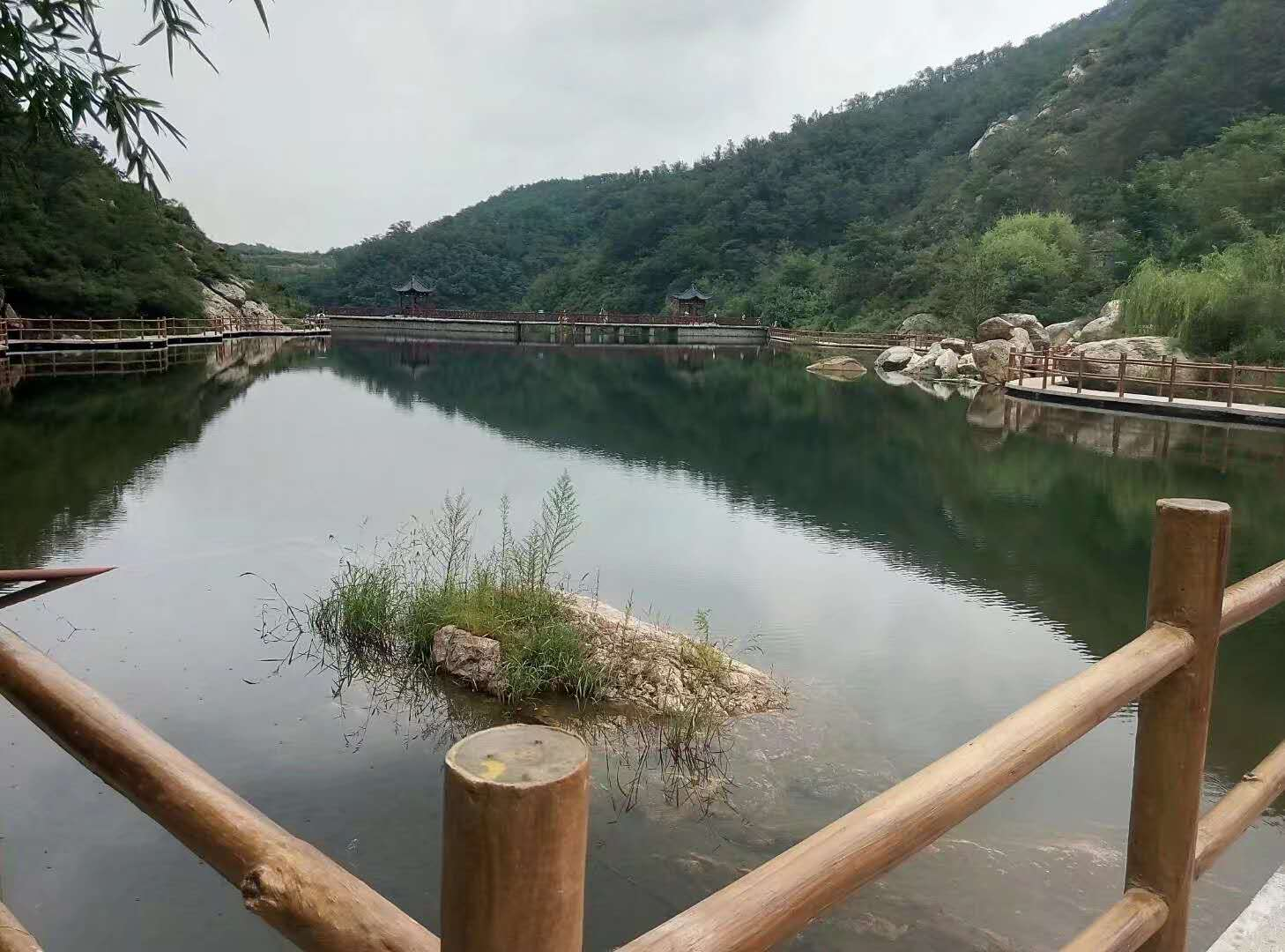
Mountain Yi lake bridge
