= Qingzhou Prefecture =

Former administrative division of China

Qingzhou Prefecture 青州府
- Prefecture of Imperial China
- 1367–1913
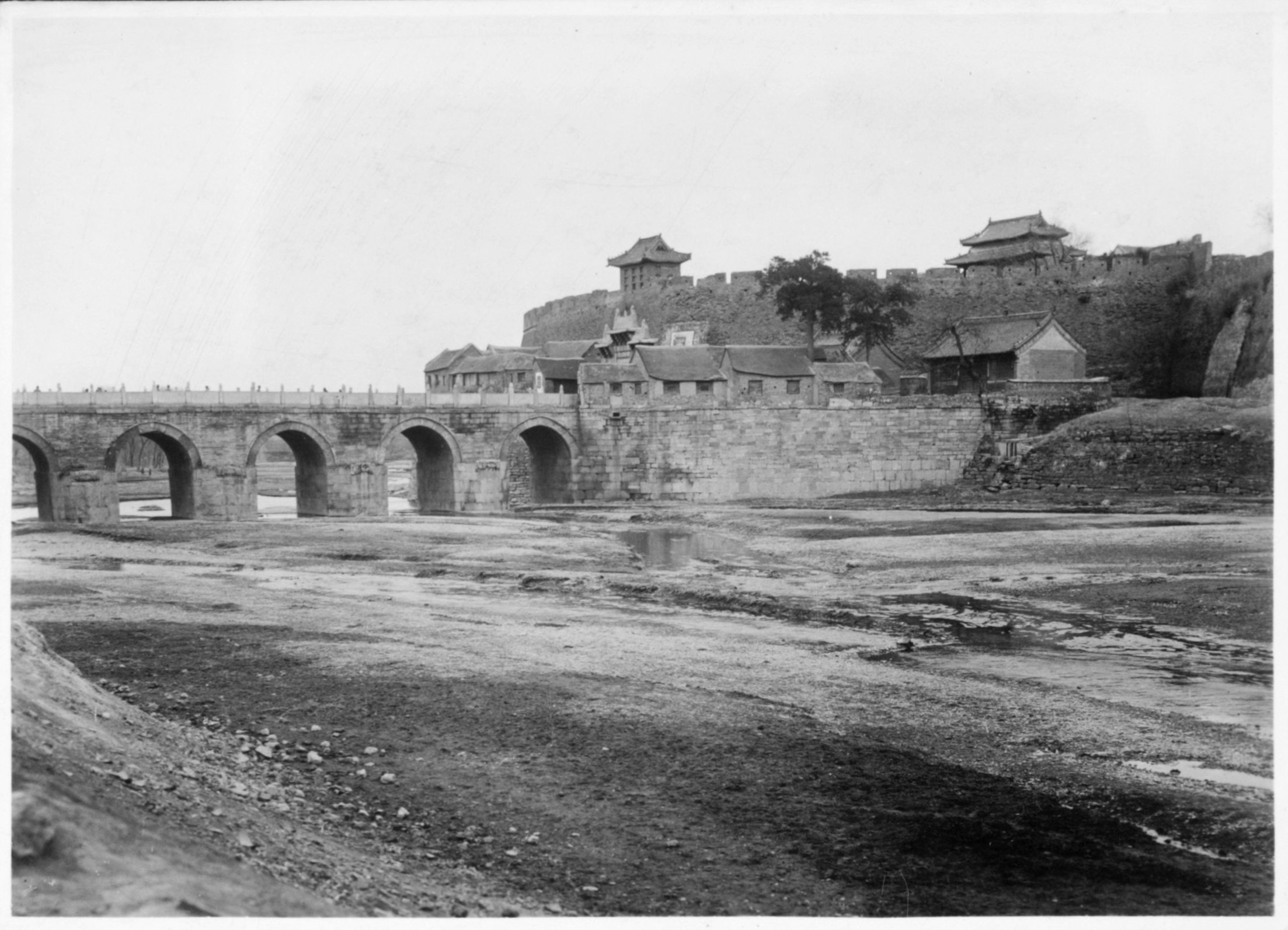
- North Gate of Qingzhou in the early 20th century

- Map of Qingzhou Fu with in Shandong Province in 1820
- History
  - Established: 1367
  - Disestablished: 1913
Preceded by	Succeeded by
Yidu Circuit	Yidu County, Shandong
- Today part of: Weifang, Zibo, Qingdao, Dongying, and Linyi

Qingzhou Prefecture (青州府) was a fu (prefecture) that existed in central Shandong from 1367 to 1913, its administrative center was in today's Qingzhou City.

== History ==
During the Yuan dynasty, the region was administered as Yidu Circuit (益都路), under the authority of the Shandong East–West Circuit Pacification Commission (山东东西道宣慰司). In 1367, during the regime of Zhu Yuanzhang, Yidu Circuit was renamed as Qingzhou Prefecture. It governed one subprefecture and thirteen counties: Yidu (益都), Linzi (臨淄), Boxing (博興), Gaoyuan (高苑), Le'an (樂安), Shouguang (壽光), Changle (昌樂), Linqu (臨朐), Anqiu (安丘), Zhucheng (諸城), Mengyin (蒙陰), and Juzhou (莒州), which administered Yishui (沂水) and Rizhao (日照).

In the early Qing dynasty, the prefecture governed Antong Guard (安東衛), one subprefecture, and thirteen counties. During the Yongzheng reign, Juzhou (莒州) became directly subordinate, and the counties of Mengyin (蒙陰), Yishui (沂水), and Rizhao (日照) were reassigned and later incorporated under Yi (沂). Boshan (博山) was newly established. In the 7th year of Qianlong, the Guard was abolished.

The prefecture then governed eleven counties: Yidu (益都), Boshan (博山), Linzi (臨淄), Boxing (博興), Gaoyuan (高苑), Le'an (樂安), Shouguang (壽光), Linqu (臨朐), Anqiu (安丘), Changle (昌樂), and Zhucheng (諸城).

The prefecture was officially classified as “important, populous, and difficult” (衝, 繁, 難). It served as the seat of the Denglai–Qing–Jiao Circuit (登萊青膠道), with a deputy commander stationed there. From Yongzheng Era to the collapse of Qing dynasty, Qingzhou was one of eleventh Manchu garrison cities in China, serving as the stronghold for Manchu-rule in this region. Many of those soldiers from Qingzhou garrison died in the First Opium War

After the Xinhai Revolution, the nationwide reform to abolish prefectures and convert them into counties was implemented, and the prefecture system was abolished.

== See also ==
- Qingzhou
- Qingzhou (ancient China)
- Qing Prefecture (Shandong)
