= Qingdao Jiaodong International Airport =

International airport serving Qingdao, Shandong, China

Qingdao Jiaodong International Airport 青岛胶东国际机场

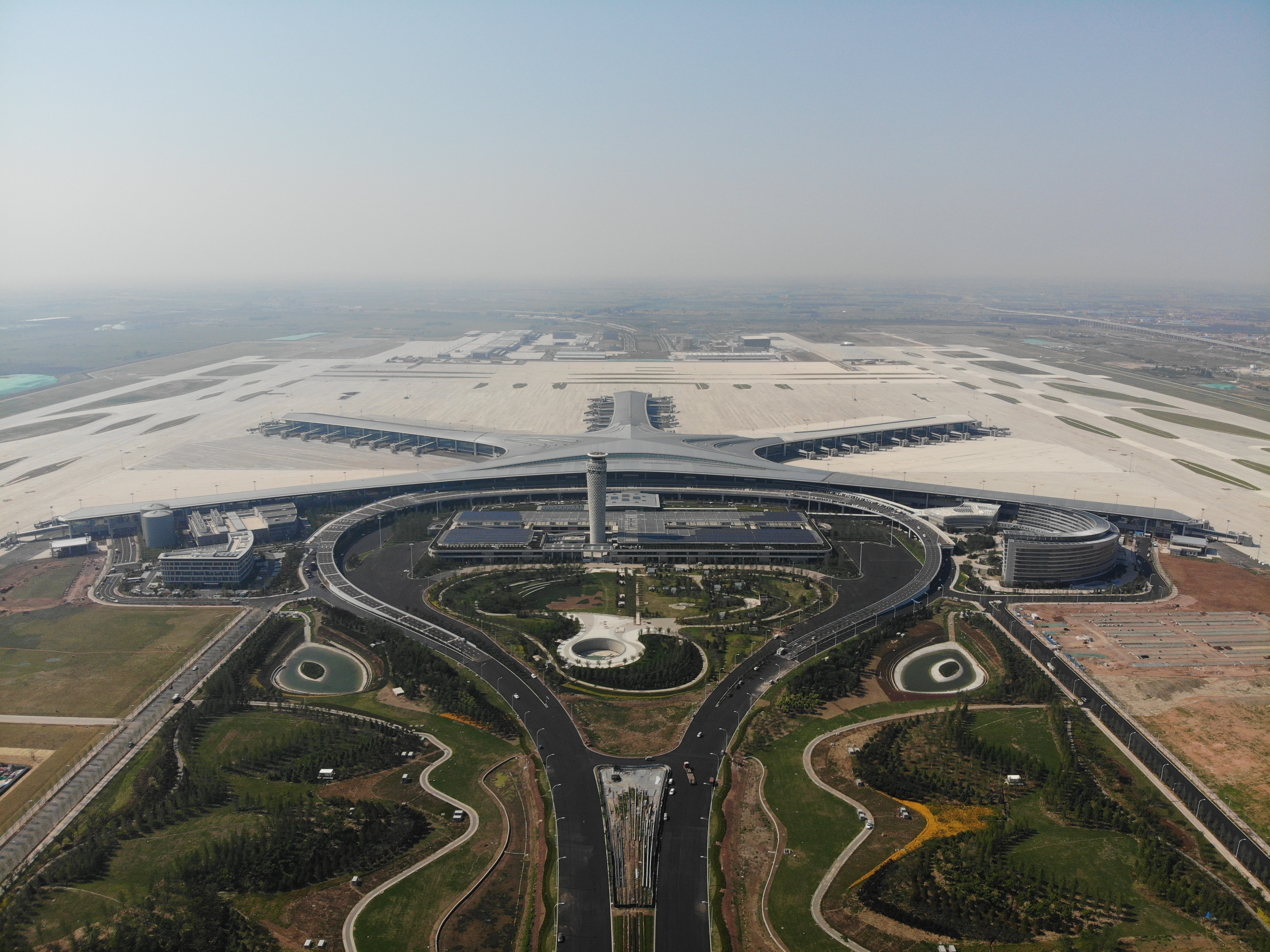
- IATA: TAO; ICAO: ZSQD

Summary
- Airport type: Public
- Owner: Qingdao International Airport Group
- Serves: Qingdao
- Location: Jiaodong, Jiaozhou, Shandong, China
- Opened: 12 August 2021; 5 years ago
- Hub for: Qingdao Airlines; Shandong Airlines
- Focus city for: Beijing Capital Airlines; China Eastern Airlines
- Elevation AMSL: 13 m (43 ft)
- Coordinates: 36°21′43″N 120°5′18″E
- Website: www.qdairport.com

Maps
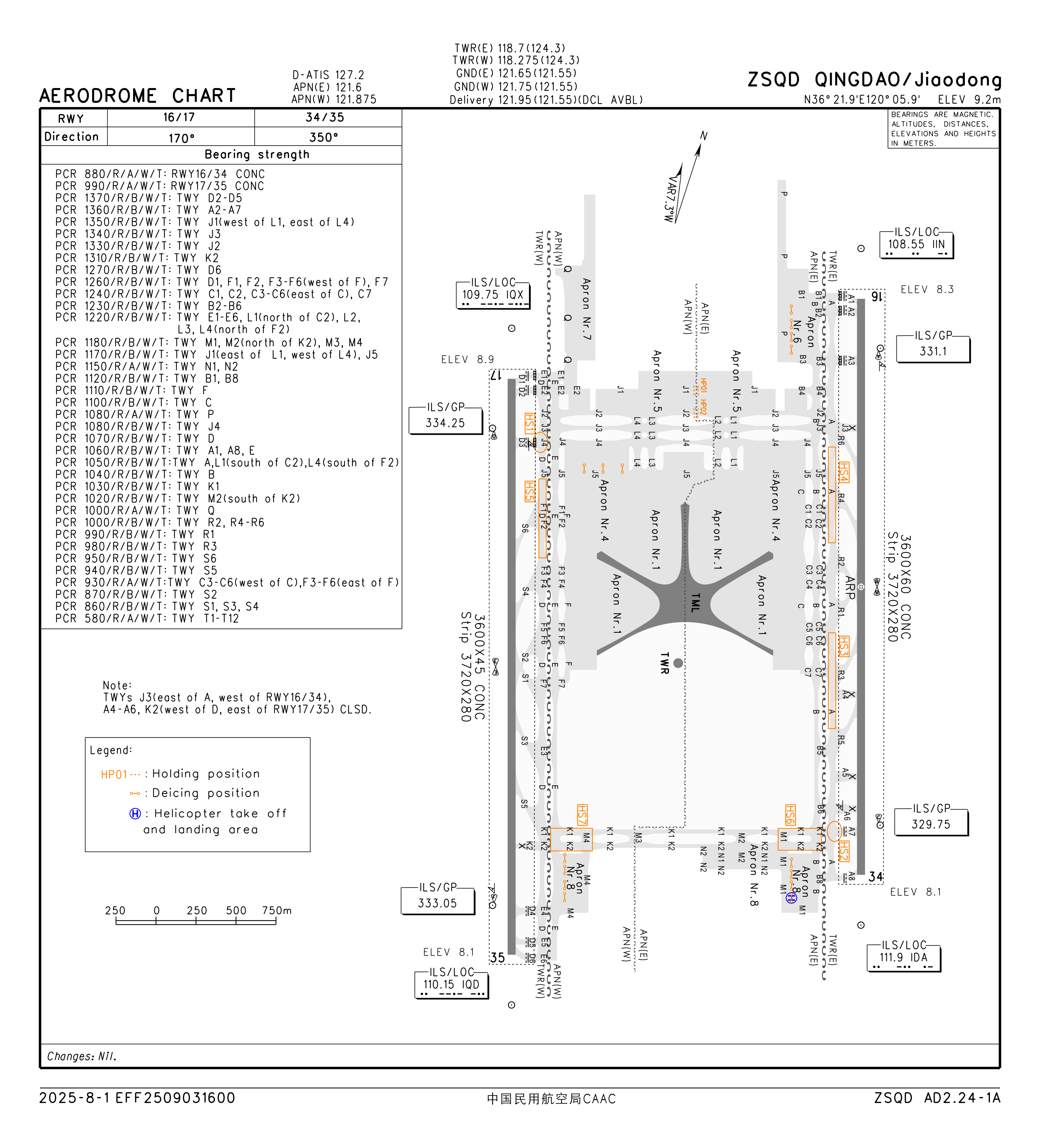
- CAAC airport chart

- Location in Shandong Location in China

Runways
Direction	Length		Surface
Direction	m	ft	Surface
16/34	3,600	11,811	Concrete
17/35	3,600	11,811	Concrete

Statistics (2025)
- Passengers: 26,896,534 ▲2.7%
- Aircraft movements: 192,823 ▲0.1%
- Cargo (Metric tonnes): 227,086.0 ▼18.7%
- Source:Civil Aviation Administration of China

Qingdao Jiaodong International Airport
- Simplified Chinese: 青岛胶东国际机场
- Traditional Chinese: 青島膠東國際機場
Transcriptions
Standard Mandarin
- Hanyu Pinyin: Qīngdǎo Jiāodōng Guójì Jīchǎng
- Wade–Giles: Ch'ing-tao Chiao-tung Kuo-chi Chi-ch'ang

Qingdao Jiaodong International Airport (IATA: TAO, ICAO: ZSQD) is an international airport serving the city of Qingdao in East China's Shandong province. It received approval in December 2013, and replaced Qingdao Liuting International Airport as the city's main airport in 2021. It is located in Jiaodong, Jiaozhou, approximately 39 kilometres (24 mi) from Qingdao city centre. The airport opened on 12 August 2021 and is currently the largest airport in Shandong, capable of handling 35 million passengers annually.

According to the Civil Aviation Administration of China, in 2025, Qingdao Jiaodong International Airport handled 26.9 million passengers and 192,823 flight takeoffs and landings, representing a year-on-year increases of 0.1% and 2.7% respectively.

== History ==
=== The Old Airport ===
Before the construction and opening of Qingdao Jiaodong International Airport, Qingdao Liuting International Airport served as the city's primary aviation hub for nearly four decades, operating until its closure in 2021. Although sometimes described as having an even longer historical lineage, modern commercial operations at Liuting lasted roughly 39 years, during which the airport expanded from a modest regional facility into a major international gateway handling over 25 million passengers annually at its peak.

For many years, Liuting Airport—then the largest and busiest airport in Shandong Province—operated under heavy strain. Although it was originally designed to handle 12 million passengers per year, it had already reached full capacity by 2012. By 2019, its actual passenger throughput had grown to more than twice its intended design limit.

=== The New Airport ===
The development of Qingdao Jiaodong International Airport was driven by the region's rapid economic growth and the increasing limitations of Liuting Airport, whose location and physical footprint could no longer support long‑term expansion. The new airport project received formal approval from the State Council and the Central Military Commission, and construction began in Jiaodong, Jiaozhou—approximately 39 kilometres from Qingdao's city centre.

The groundbreaking ceremony for Qingdao Jiaodong International Airport took place in June 2015, marking the formal start of the new airport project. In June 2016, the terminal building reached a key structural milestone with the hoisting of its first steel component. The main construction phase advanced significantly in April 2017, when full-scale building work began across the airfield and terminal complex. By October 2018, the project entered its testing and commissioning stage, during which systems, equipment, and operational procedures were progressively evaluated.

In September 2019, the airport moved into the large‑scale interior decoration and equipment installation phase, preparing the terminal for operational readiness. By June 2020, the terminal building and all associated civil aviation engineering works had passed completion acceptance, paving the way for final operational testing before the airport's official opening on 12 August 2021.

In January 2021, two aircraft successfully completed test flights. Qingdao Jiaodong International Airport officially opened to the public on 12 August 2021, amidst the COVID-19 pandemic.

On 12 August 2021, Qingdao Jiaodong International Airport officially opened to the public, marking a major upgrade to the region's aviation infrastructure. That same night, Qingdao executed a highly coordinated "one‑night transfer", in which all flight operations were moved from Liuting Airport to the new Jiaodong facility in a single overnight logistical operation. At around 1:30 a.m., the final departure lifted off from Liuting, after which the runway, terminal, and tower lights were shut down sequentially—symbolically concluding Liuting Airport's decades of service.

== Facilities ==
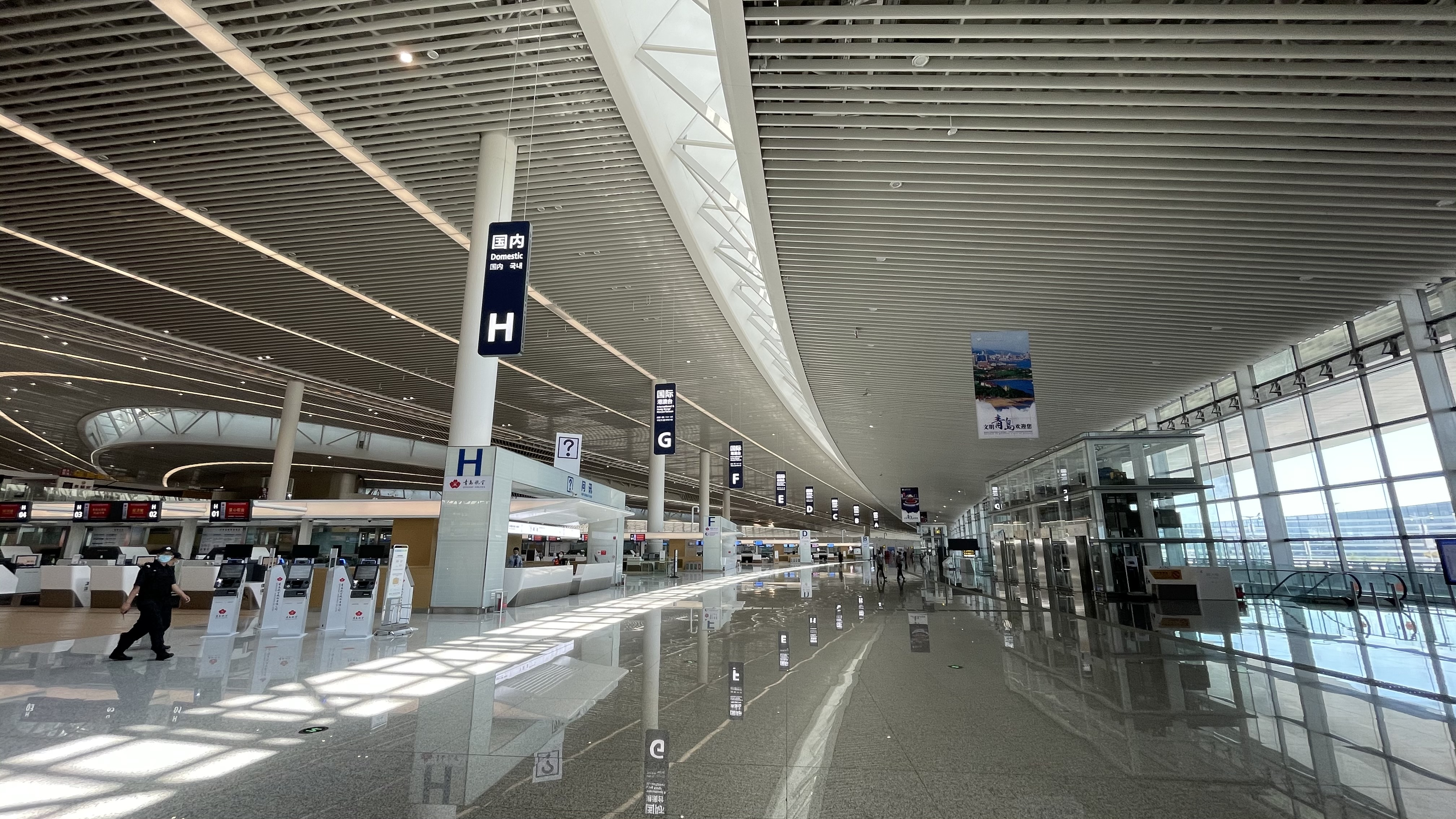
Departures hall

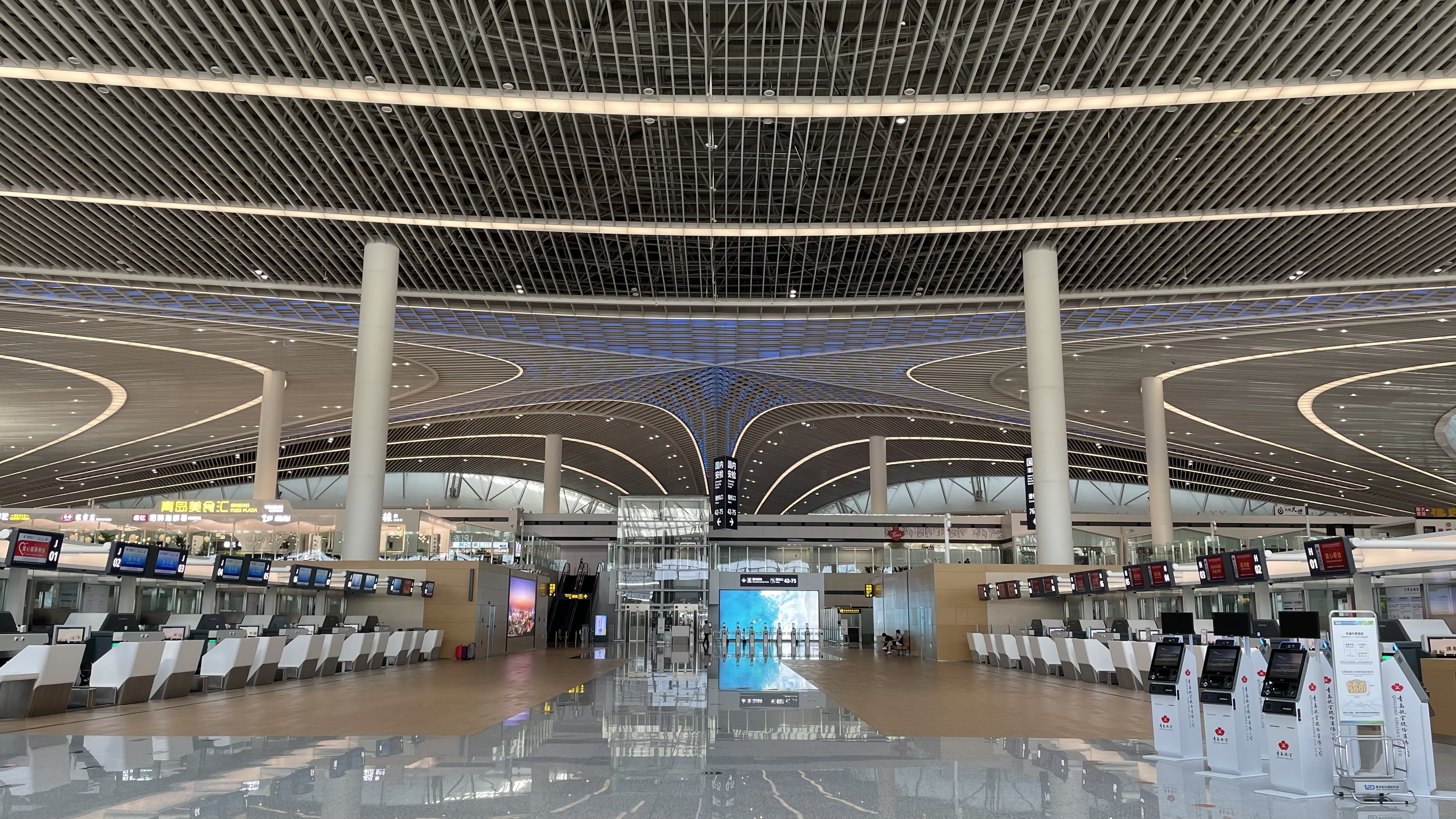
Check-in area

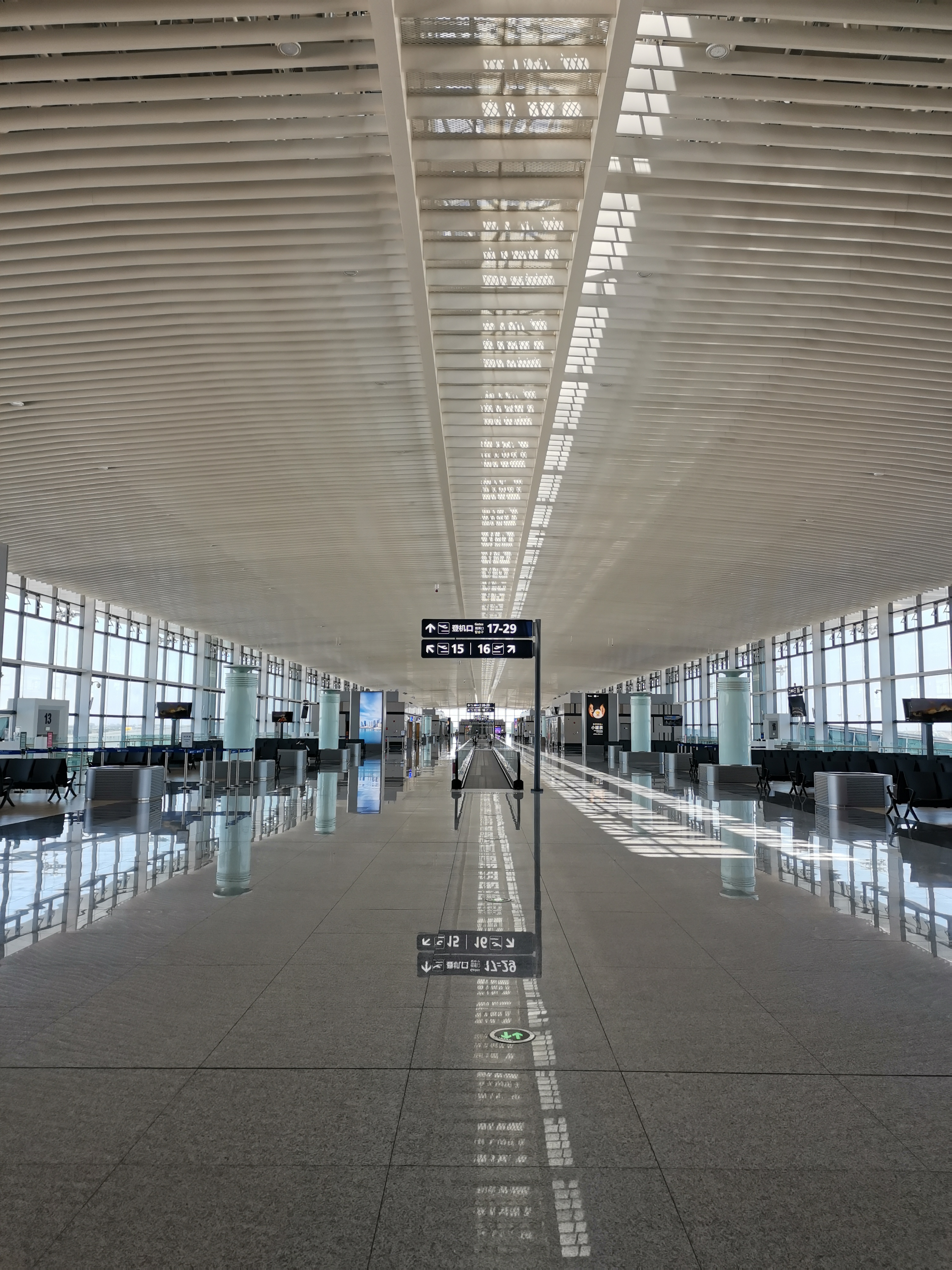
Departures concourse

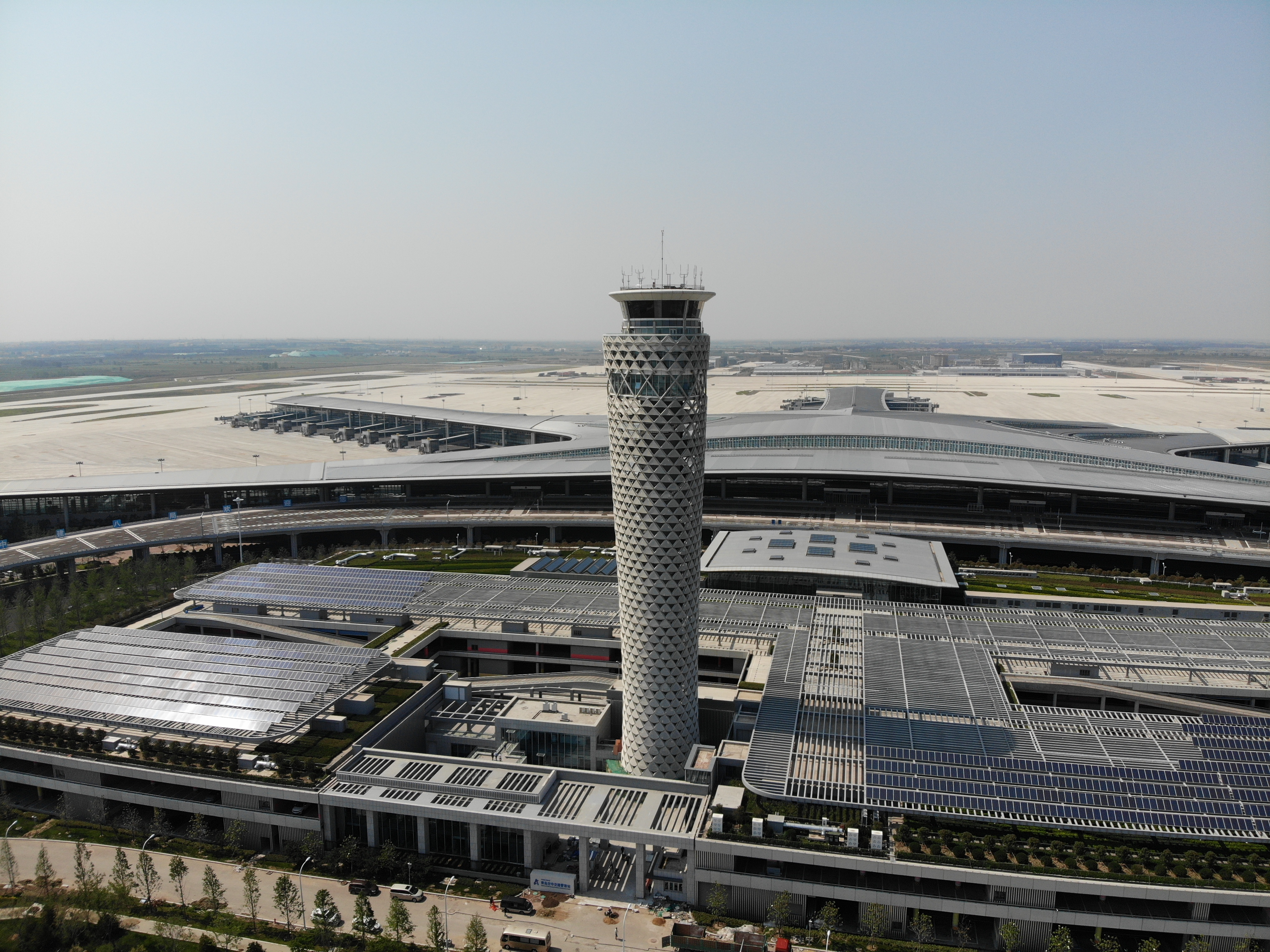
Airport control tower

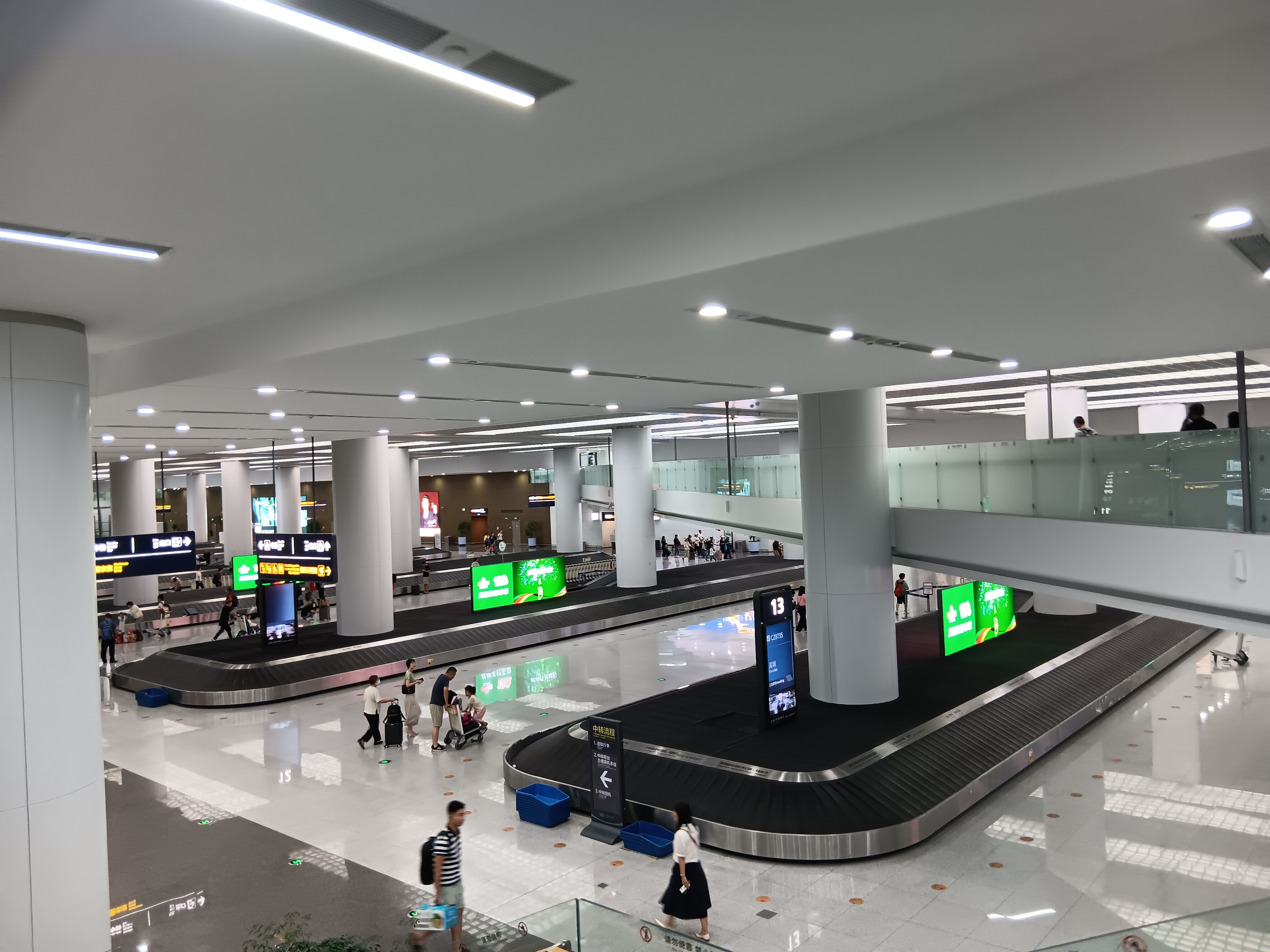
Baggage claim area

The airport has two Class 4F runways, both 3,600 metres (11,800 ft) long. The runways are able to handle extremely large aircraft, such as the Airbus A380. It has a single 478,000 square metres (5,150,000 sq ft) terminal building. The terminal is designed in a starfish shape, with 5 airside concourses jutting out of it. The roof of the terminal is made out of 0.5 millimetres (0.020 in) thick stainless steel, and spans 223,000 square metres (2,400,000 sq ft). It has a total of 178 aircraft stands and can meet the needs of handling 35 million passengers annually, 500,000 tons of cargo and mail, and 300,000 aircraft takeoffs and landings annually

== Airlines and destinations ==
=== Passenger ===
A Shandong Airlines plane from Ürümqi landing at Jiaodong Airport

Airlines	Destinations
Air Guilin	Guilin
Beijing Capital Airlines	Changchun, Enshi, Jingzhou, London–Gatwick, Moscow–Sheremetyevo, Nanning, Vancouver
Cathay Pacific	Hong Kong
Chengdu Airlines	Hohhot
China Eastern Airlines	Fuzhou, Hefei, Hohhot, Huizhou, Kunming, Mudanjiang, Nanchang, Nanning, Qiqihar, Sanming, Wenzhou, Xining, Zhuhai
China Express Airlines	Quzhou
China Southern Airlines	Dalian, Jieyang, Nanning, Yanji
China United Airlines	Chengdu–Tianfu
Chongqing Airlines	Harbin
Donghai Airlines	Changzhi, Kunming, Lishui, Shenzhen, Yichang
Fuzhou Airlines	Fuzhou, Hailar, Harbin
GX Airlines	Ganzhou, Nanchong, Nanning, Nanyang, Xiangyang
Hainan Airlines	Guangzhou, Sanya, Taiyuan, Urumqi, Xi'an
Jeju Air	Seoul–Incheon
Jiangxi Air	Nanchang
Juneyao Air	Changsha, Chifeng, Osaka–Kansai, Wenzhou, Wuxi
Korean Air	Busan, Seoul–Incheon
LJ Air	Taiyuan
Loong Air	Ningbo
Qingdao Airlines	Bangkok–Suvarnabhumi, Changsha, Chengdu–Tianfu, Cheongju, Daegu, Dalian, Ho Chi Minh City, Hefei, Hong Kong, Jiamusi, Kuala Lumpur–International, Kuqa, Lijiang, Nagoya–Centrair, Nanchang, Nanning, Ningbo, Penang, Quanzhou, Shanghai–Pudong, Shizuoka, Taizhou, Wenzhou, Xishuangbanna, Zhengzhou, Zhoushan
Ruili Airlines	Kunming, Taiyuan
Scoot	Singapore
Shandong Airlines	Fuzhou, Guangzhou, Guilin, Hangzhou, Hanoi, Hefei, Ho Chi Minh City, Hong Kong, Kuala Lumpur–International, Longnan, Nanchang, Nanning, Quzhou, Sanya, Shiyan, Wuyishan, Xi'an, Zhangjiajie, Zhengzhou, Zhuhai; Seasonal: Taichung
Sichuan Airlines	Chengdu–Tianfu
Spring Airlines	Nanchang, Shenyang
Suparna Airlines	Shanghai–Pudong, Wuhan
Tianjin Airlines	Chizhou, Haikou, Wenzhou, Yulin (Shaanxi)
Trinity Airways	Seoul–Incheon
West Air	Harbin
XiamenAir	Changchun, Fuzhou, Hanoi, Mudanjiang, Osaka–Kansai, Phnom Penh, Quanzhou, Yanji
Xizang Airlines	Chengdu–Shuangliu, Lhasa, Wuhu

=== Cargo ===
Airlines	Destinations
ANA Cargo	Naha
SF Airlines	Liège
Shandong Airlines Cargo	Hefei

== Ground transport ==
The Airport is connected to inner Qingdao by the S62 Expressway, which is connected with G20 Expressway and G22 Expressway. The airport has a 5-level parking garage.

=== Public transport ===
==== Metro ====
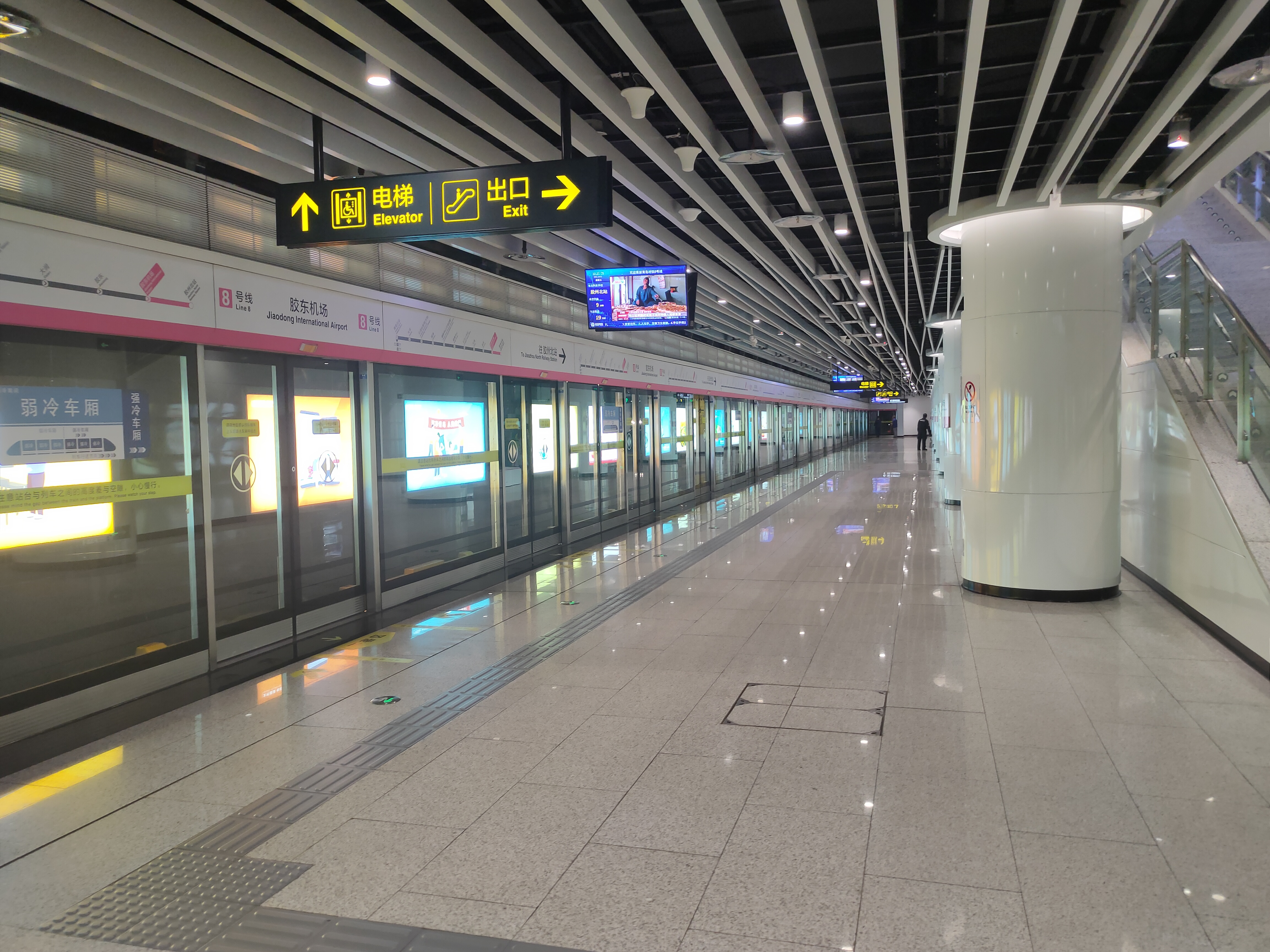
A platform in the Jiaodong International Airport Station

Qingdao Metro Line 8 operates between Jiaodong Airport and May 4th Square. The metro station is located underground next to the airport's high-speed railway station. It takes 37 minutes to travel to Qingdao North railway station where passengers can transfer to Line 1 or Line 3 towards the downtown.

Apart from the regular operations, the metro operates direct airport express trains from Qingdao North railway station to the airport in the morning and evening.

==== Railway ====
Qingdao Airport railway station is on the Jinan-Qingdao high-speed railway, which is operated by China Railway, providing connections to surrounding cities such as Weifang, Yantai, Linyi and Rizhao. The station is located underground at the airport.

For departing passengers from Weifang, Linyi and Rizhao, the city terminals serve in-town early check-in service before arriving at the Qingdao airport, which are located in Weifang North, Linyi North and Rizhao West railway station.

Passengers departing from Qingdao can also take a train to the airport at Qingdao North and Jiaozhou North Railway Station.

== See also ==
- List of airports in China
- List of the busiest airports in China
