= May 4th Square station =

Qingdao Metro station

May 4th Square 五四广场
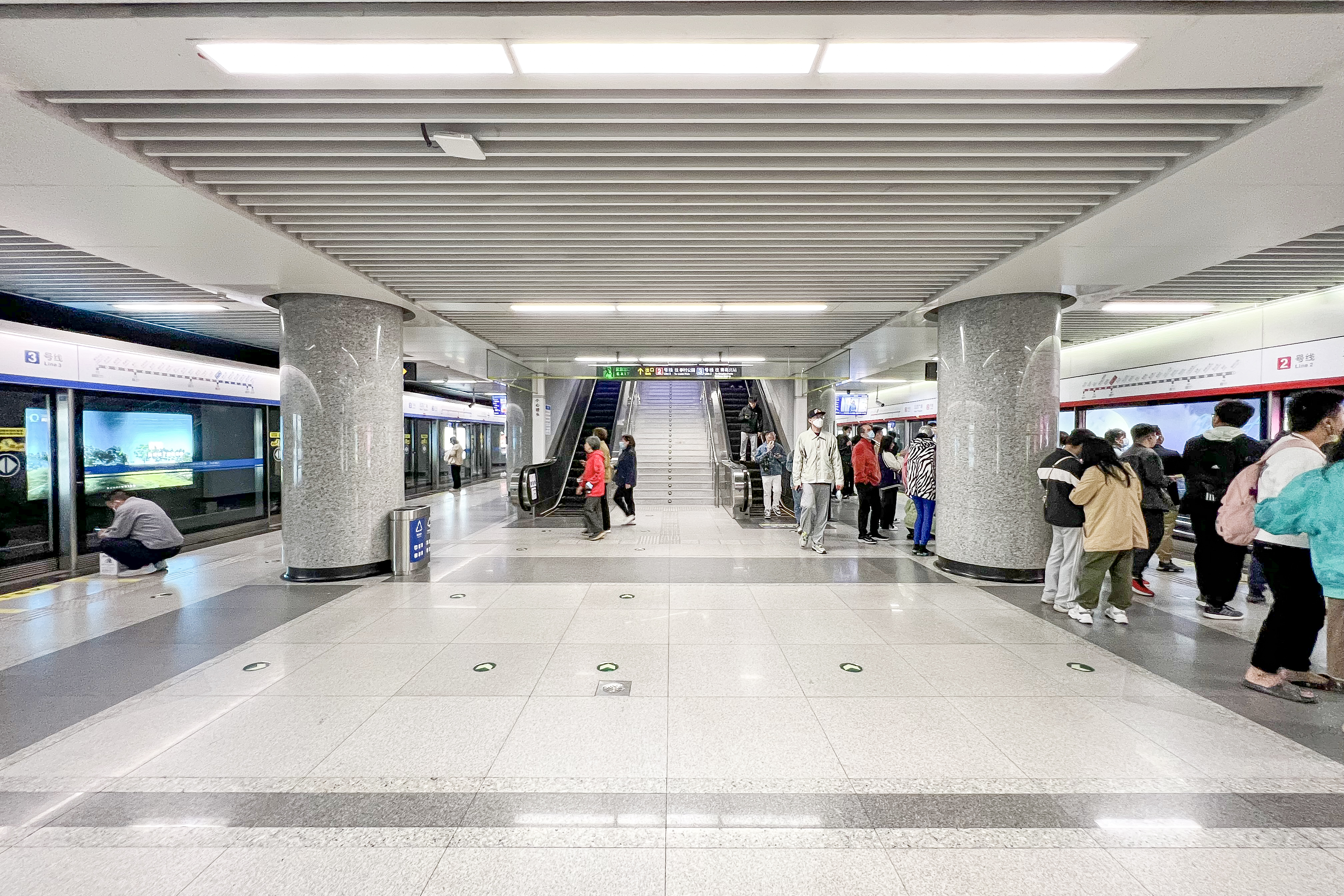
- Line 2 and 3 platforms

General information
- Location: Shinan District, Qingdao, Shandong; China
- Operator: Qingdao Metro Corporation
- Lines: Line 2 Line 3 Line 8
- Platforms: 6 (3 island platforms)

History
- Opened: 18 December 2016; 9 years ago

Services
| Preceding station | Qingdao Metro | Following station |
|---|---|---|
| Zhiquan Road towards Sichuan Road (Qingdao Ferry Terminal) | Line 2 | Fushansuo towards Licun Park |
| Yan'an 3rd Road towards Qingdao Railway Station | Line 3 | Jiangxi Road towards Qingdao North Railway Station |
| Aokema Flyover towards Jiaozhou North Railway Station | Line 8 | Terminus |
Location

May 4th Square, formerly known as Wusi Guangchang (Chinese: 五四广场) is a transfer station on Line 2, Line 3 and Line 8 of the Qingdao Metro. It opened on 18 December 2016.

== Gallery ==
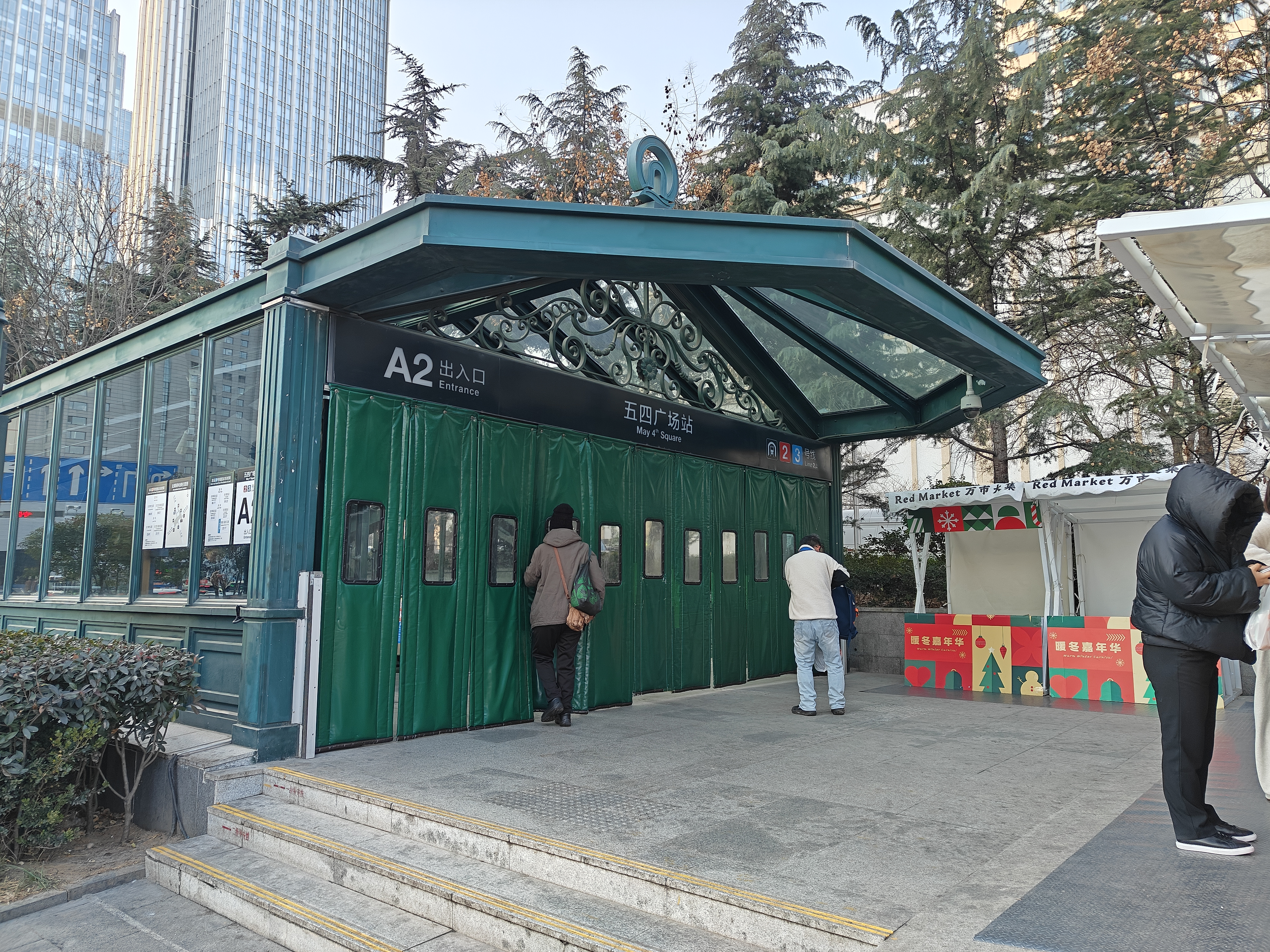
Entrance A2

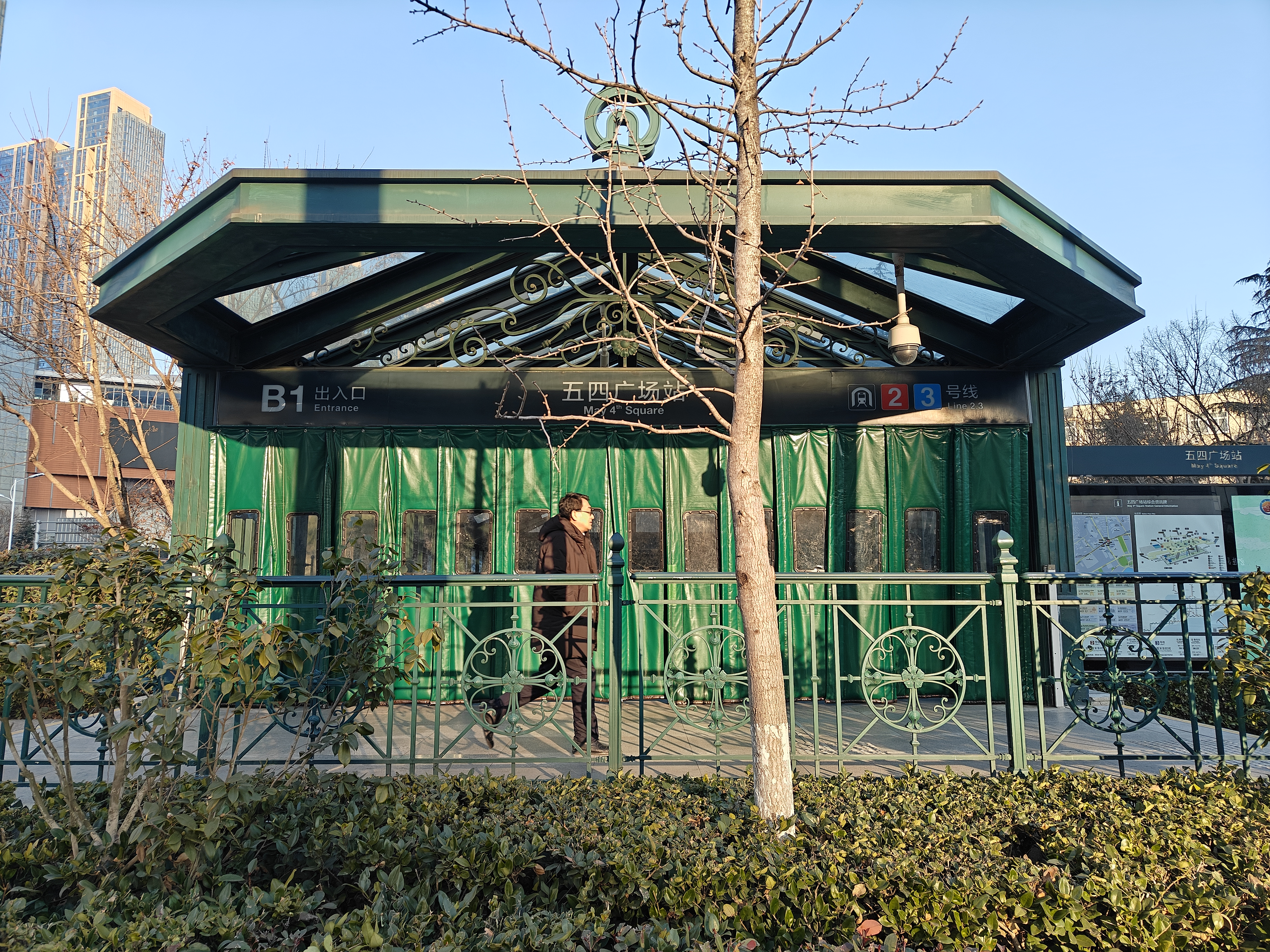
Entrance B1

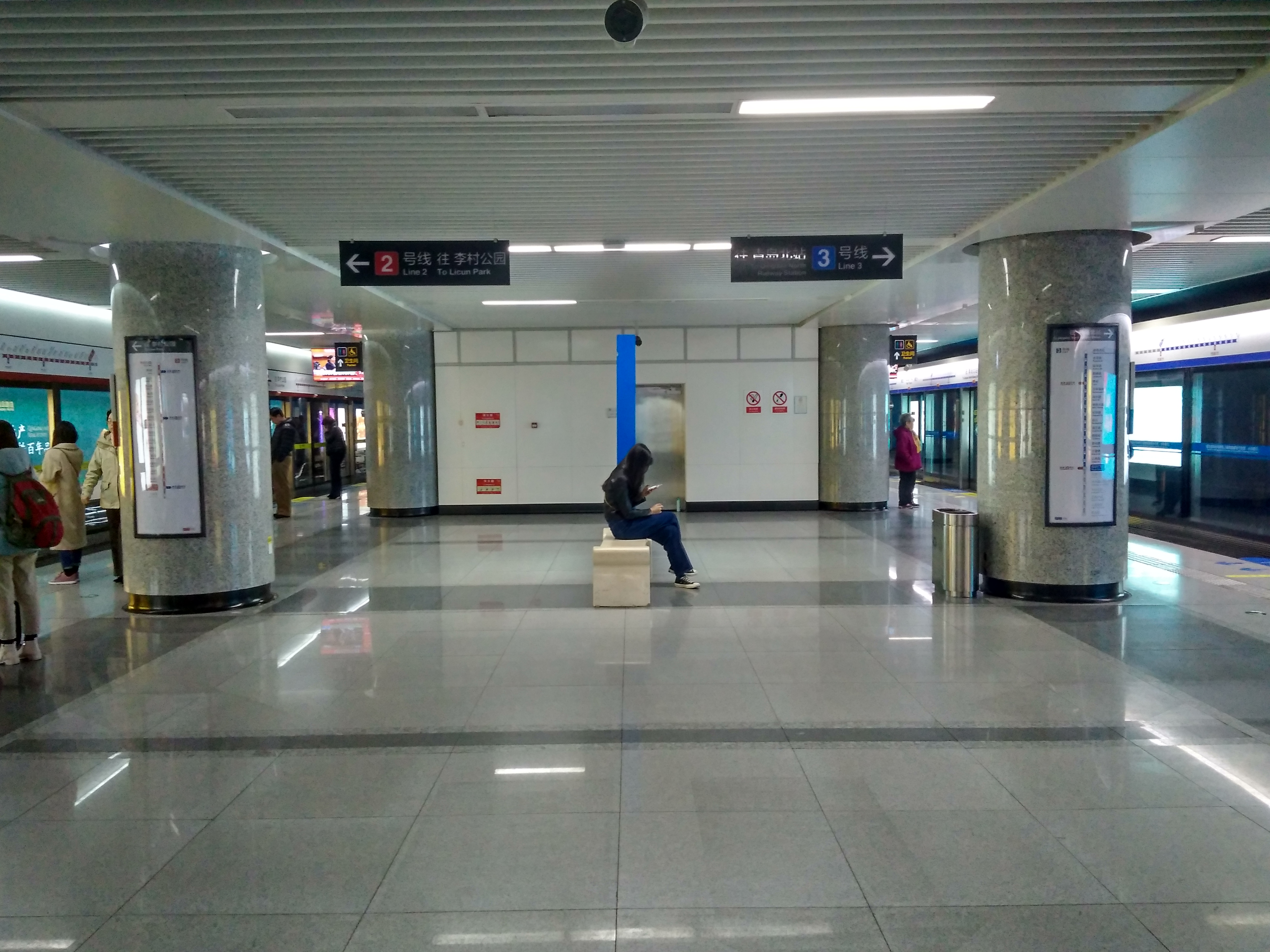
Line 2 and 3 platform

Line 8 platform
