= Dongjiakou Port railway =

Freight-only railway in Shandong, China

Overview
- Native name: 董家口港区疏港铁路

History
- Opened: 25 December 2018

Technical
- Line length: 15 km (9.3 mi)
- Track gauge: 1,435 mm (4 ft 8 1/2 in) standard gauge
- Operating speed: 80 km/h (50 mph)

The Dongjiakou Port railway (Chinese: 董家口港区疏港铁路) is a freight-only railway line in Shandong, China.

== History ==
The line was approved on 16 February 2011. It opened on 25 December 2018.

== Route ==
The line is approximately 15 kilometres (9.3 mi) long and has a speed limit of 80 kilometres per hour (50 mph). At its northern terminus, there is a grade-separated junction allowing trains to continue in either direction on the Qingdao–Yancheng railway. The junction is located just to the north of Dongjiakou railway station.
