= YNJ =

YNJ may refer to:

- Yanji Chaoyangchuan International Airport (IATA: YNJ), an airport serving the city of Yanji in Jilin province of Northeast China
- Yanji (Division code: YNJ), a county-level city in the east of China's Jilin Province
