= Jinan–Qingdao high-speed railway =

High-speed rail line in Shandong, China

Jinan–Qingdao high-speed railway Qingdao–Yinchuan corridor Jinan–Qingdao section 高铁青银通道胶济段

Overview
- Status: Operational
- Owner: China Railway
- Locale: Shandong
- Termini: Hongdao; Jinan East

Service
- Type: High-speed rail
- Operator(s): China Railway Jinan Group

History
- Opened: December 26, 2018

Technical
- Line length: 307.83 km (191 mi)
- Track gauge: 1,435 mm (4 ft 8 1/2 in)
- Operating speed: 350 km/h (217 mph)

Jinan–Qingdao high-speed railway
- Simplified Chinese: 济青高速铁路
- Traditional Chinese: 濟青高速鐵路
Transcriptions
Standard Mandarin
- Hanyu Pinyin: Jǐqīng Gāosù Tiělù
- IPA: [tɕì.tɕʰíŋ káʊ.sû tʰjè.lû]

Alternative Chinese name
- Simplified Chinese: 胶济高速铁路
- Traditional Chinese: 膠濟高速鐵路
Transcriptions
Standard Mandarin
- Hanyu Pinyin: Jiāojǐ Gāosù Tiělù
- IPA: [tɕjáʊ.tɕì káʊ.sû tʰjè.lû]

The Jinan–Qingdao high-speed railway or Jiqing high-speed railway is a high-speed railway between Qingdao and Jinan, the two main cities of Shandong province. Qingdao and Jinan were already served by two double-track lines consisting of the high-speed Qingdao–Jinan Passenger Railway and the conventional Qingdao–Jinan Railway. The new railway is a part of the Qingdao–Yinchuan corridor, one of the 8+8 national high-speed rail gridline, and provides further relief to rail transport between Qingdao and Jinan. Planning was approved by the NDRC on June 10, 2014 with construction starting a year later. Tracklaying started in 2017 and the whole line was opened on 26 December 2018. The railway shortens travel times between Qingdao and Jinan to 1 hour. This is in contrast to the 2.5 hours needed on the Qingdao–Jinan Passenger Railway and 4 hours on the original conventional Qingdao–Jinan Railway.

== Stations ==
Station Name	China Railway transfers/connections	Metro transfers/connections
Jinan East		3
Zhangqiu North		
Zouping		
Zibo North		
Linzi North		
Qingzhoushi North		
Weifang North	Weifang–Laixi high-speed railway	
Gaomi North		
Jiaozhou North	Qingdao–Jinan passenger railway	8
Qingdao Airport		8 (via Jiaodong International Airport station)
Hongdao	Qingdao–Yancheng railway	8
Qingdao North	Qingdao–Rongcheng intercity railway	1 3 8

== See also ==
- Qingdao–Jinan Passenger Railway – a slower high-speed railway running alongside the Qingdao–Jinan Railway.
