= Line 8 (Qingdao Metro) =

Qingdao Metro line

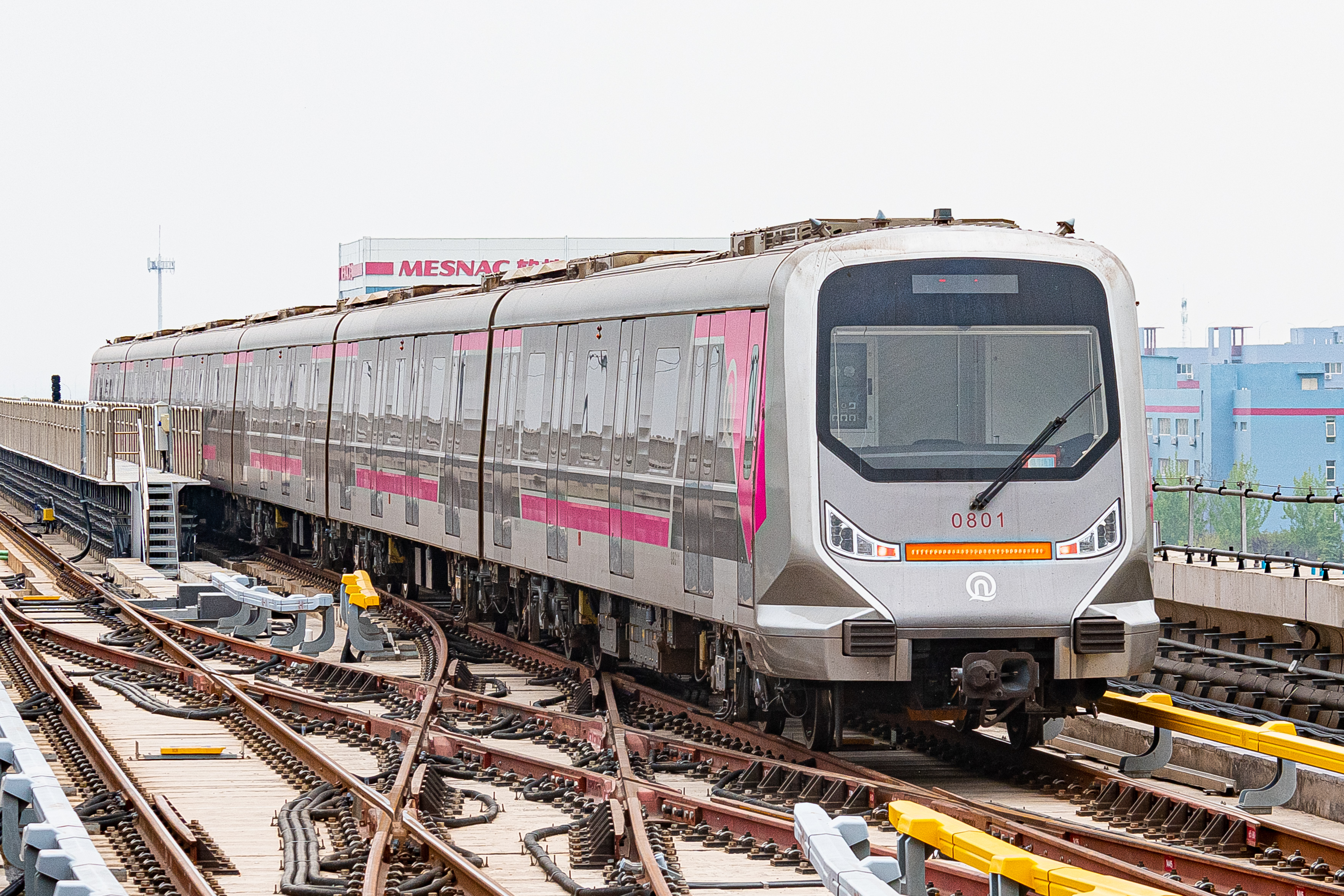
- Line 8 train at Jiaodong station

Overview
- Native name: 青岛地铁8号线
- Status: In operation
- Owner: Government of Qingdao
- Locale: Qingdao, China
- Termini: Jiaozhou North Railway Station; May 4th Square
- Stations: 18 (operational)

Service
- Type: Rapid transit
- System: Qingdao Metro
- Operator: Qingdao Metro Corporation

History
- Opened: December 24, 2020; 5 years ago

Technical
- Line length: 61.4 km (38.15 mi)
- Number of tracks: 2
- Track gauge: 1,435 mm (4 ft 8 1/2 in)

Line 8 of Qingdao Metro is a rapid transit line in Qingdao, Shandong, China, which opened on 24 December 2020.

== Opening timeline ==
Segment	Commencement	Length	Station(s)	Name
Jiaozhou North Railway Station — Qingdao North Railway Station	24 December 2020	48.3 km (30.01 mi)	10	North section
Jiaodong International Airport	20 July 2021	Infill station	1	
Dongnanshan - May 4th Square	22 September 2026	13.1 km (8.14 mi)	7	South section

== Stations ==
=== Main line ===
Service routes: 3 express trains depart from May 4th Square to Jiaozhou North Railway Station and 5 express train depart from Jiaodong International Airport to May 4th Square daily. Express train with additional stops at Xiwujiacun, while night express train departs from Jiaodong International Airport and stops at Aokema Flyover..

Legend:

●	All trains stop.
▲	Express
▼	Night Express
|	No stop.
◆	For night express trains depart at 22:25, 22:45, 23:15 bound for May 4th Square, Aokema Flyover not stop

Service Pattern			Station name		Connections	Distance km	Location
Local	Express	Night Express	English	Chinese	Connections	Distance km	Location
●	▲		Jiaozhou North Railway Station	胶州北站	JZK		Jiaozhou
●	▲	▼	Jiaodong International Airport	胶东机场	TAO; QJK		Jiaozhou
●	|	|	Jiaodong	胶东			Jiaozhou
●	|	|	Dajian	大涧			Chengyang
●	|	|	Hongdao Railway Station	红岛火车站	Hongdao railway station		Chengyang
●	|	|	Health Center	健康中心			Chengyang
●	|	|	Fitness Center (Hongdao International Convention and Exhibition Center)	健身中心（红岛会展）			Chengyang
●	|	|	Guantao	观涛			Chengyang
●	|	|	Hongdao Science and Technology Museum (Fangte)	红岛科技馆（方特）			Chengyang
●	|	|	Dayang	大洋			Chengyang
●	▲	▼	Qingdao North Railway Station	青岛北站	1 3 QHK		Licang
●	|	|	Dongnanshan	东南山			Licang
●	|	|	Yanjiashan	闫家山			Shibei
●	|	|	Xiaoshuiqinggou	小水清沟			Shibei
●	|	|	Dashan	大山			Shibei
●	▲	▼	Xiwujiacun	西吴家村	4		Shibei
●	|	◆	Aokema Flyover	澳柯玛桥			Shinan
●	▲	▼	May 4th Square	五四广场	2 3		Shinan

=== Branch ===
- Under construction, opening in 2027

Station name		Connections	Distance km	Location
English	Chinese	Connections	Distance km	Location
Dajian	大涧	8 (Main line)		Chengyang
Daguhe Museum	大沽河博物馆			Jiaozhou
Shaohai North	少海北			Jiaozhou
Taihu Road	太湖路			Jiaozhou
Zhanqian Avenue	站前大道			Jiaozhou
Hai'er Avenue	海尔大道			Jiaozhou
Wenzhou Road	温州路			Jiaozhou
Fuzhou South Road	福州南路			Jiaozhou
Guangzhou Road	广州路			Jiaozhou
Luzhou Road	泸州路			Jiaozhou
Lanzhou West Road	兰州西路			Jiaozhou
Jiaozhou Railway Station	胶州站	JXK		Jiaozhou
