= Qingdao West railway station =

Railway station in Qingdao, Shandong, China

Qingdao West 青岛西
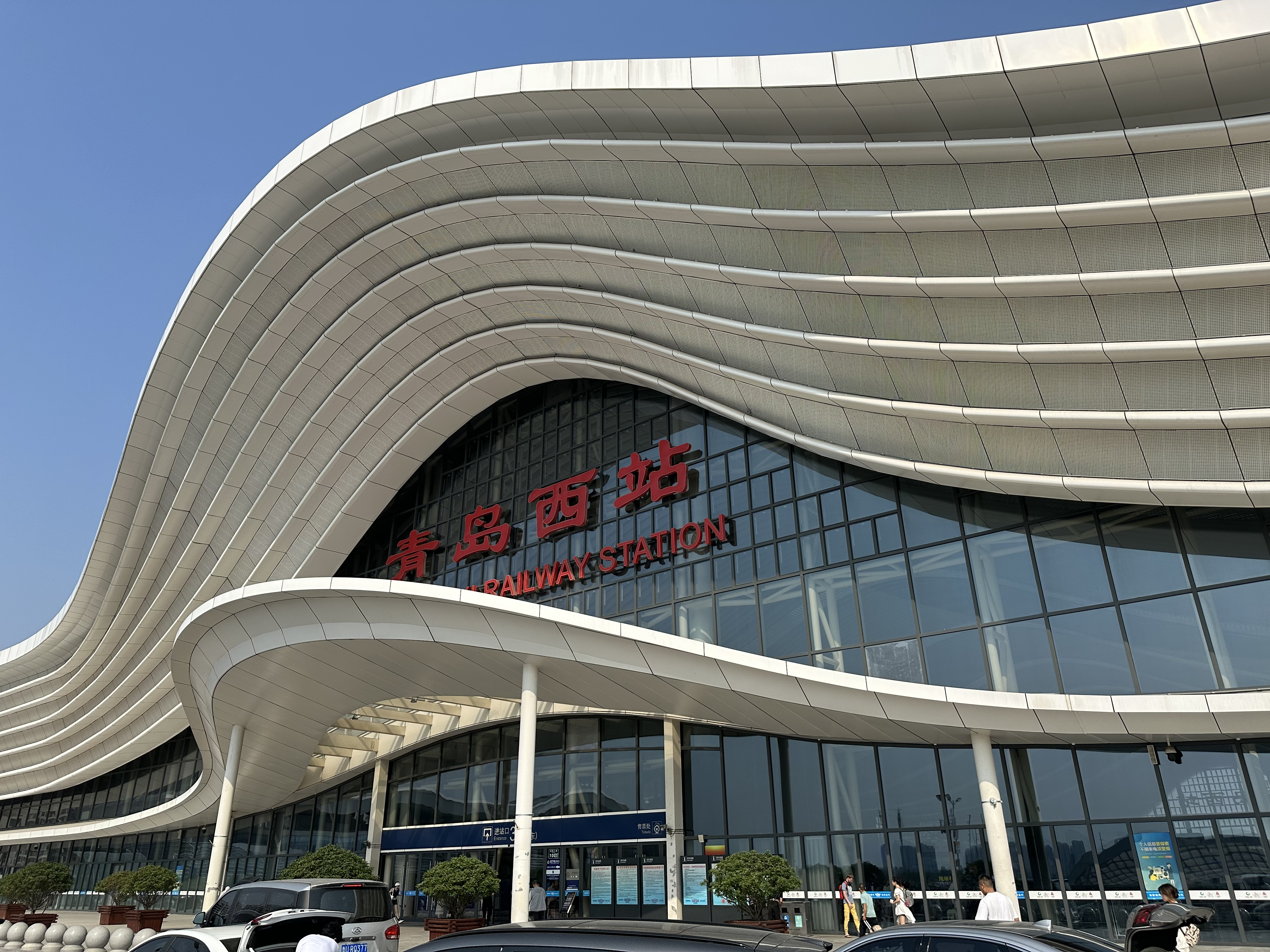

General information
- Location: Huangdao District, Qingdao, Shandong; China
- Coordinates: 35.9023°N 119.9506°E
- Line: Qingdao–Yancheng railway

History
- Opened: 26 December 2018
Location

Qingdao West railway station (Chinese: 青岛西站; pinyin: Qīngdǎoxī zhàn) is a railway station located in Huangdao District, Qingdao, Shandong, China. It opened with the Qingdao–Yancheng railway on 26 December 2018.

== Metro station ==
The under construction Line 6 of the Qingdao Metro will serve this station.

== See also ==
- Qingdao railway station
- Qingdao North railway station
- Qingdao Airport railway station
- Hongdao railway station

Preceding station	China Railway High-speed	Following station
Qingdao North Terminus	Qingdao–Yancheng railway	Dongjiakou towards Yancheng
