= Jiaozhou North railway station =

Railway station in Jiaozhou City, China

Coordinates: 36.3968°N 120.0500°E

Jiaozhou North 胶州北
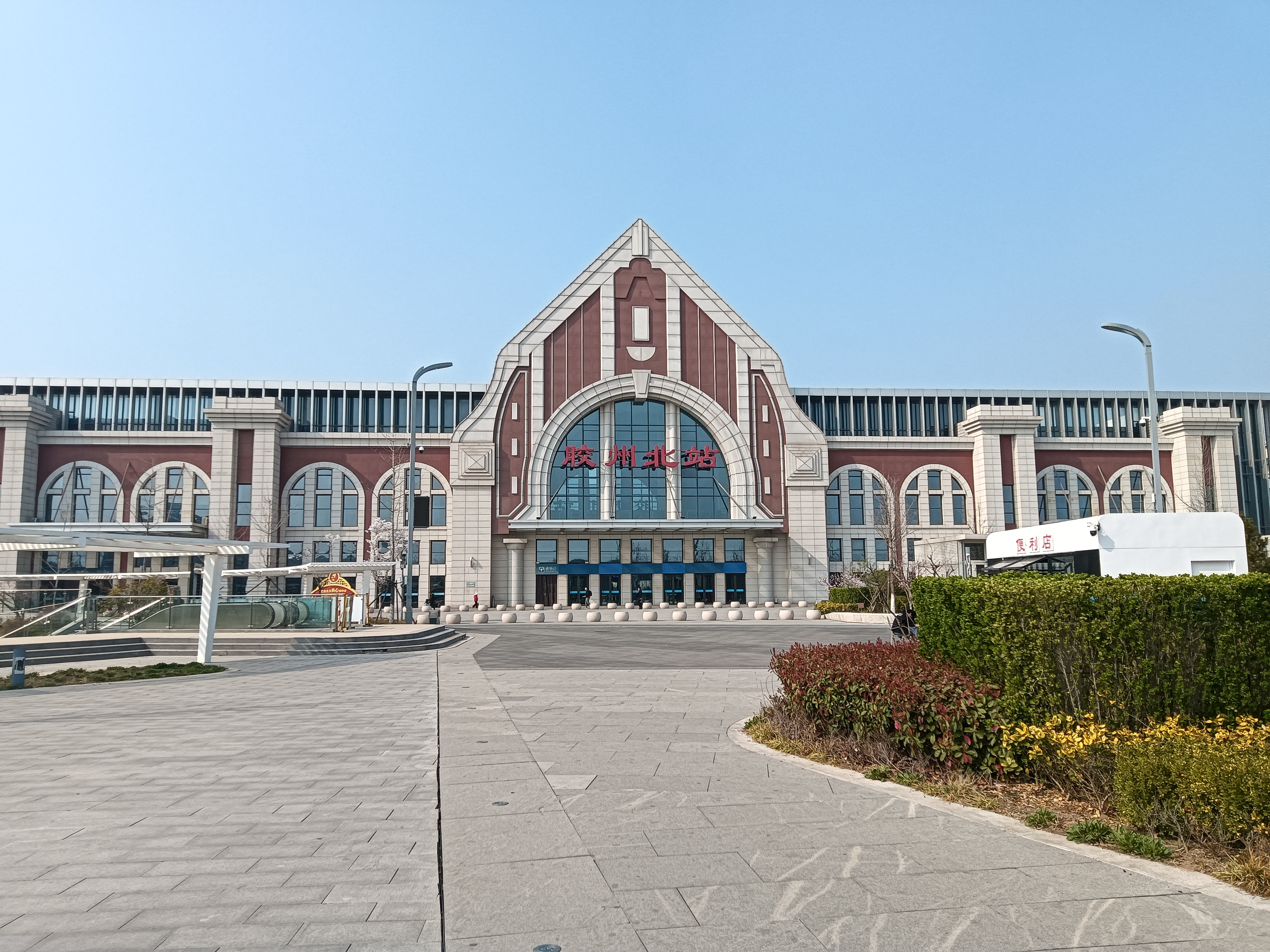
- Station building

General information
- Other names: Jiaozhou North
- Location: Jiaozhou, Qingdao, Shandong; China
- Operator: CR Jinan
- Line: Qingdao–Jinan high-speed railway Qingdao-Jinan Passenger Railway

Other information
- Station code: Telegraph code: JZK; Pinyin code: JZB

History
- Opened: January 11, 2011; 15 years ago

Services
Preceding station	China Railway High-speed	Following station
Gaomi North towards Jinan East	Jinan–Qingdao high-speed railway	Terminus
Qingdao North towards Qingdao	Qingdao–Jinan passenger railway	Gaomi towards Jinan
Under construction
Gaomi North towards Jinan East	Jinan–Qingdao high-speed railway	Qingdao Airport towards Hongdao
Location

Jiaozhou North (simplified Chinese: 胶州北站; traditional Chinese: 膠州北站; pinyin: Jiāozhōu běi zhàn) is a railway station found on the boundary between Jiaodong Subdistrict and Jiaolai Town of Jiaozhou, Qingdao, Shandong, China. It currently is on the Qingdao–Jinan high-speed railway and Qingdao–Jinan passenger railway.

== History ==
Construction was approved by the Ministry of Railways in June 2006, and construction began in November 2008. Train service began on January 11, 2011, with four trains, two towards Jinan and two towards Qingdao.

== Service ==
Before reconstruction, the station offered trains to Qingdao and Jinan, as well as trains to Beijing and Shanghai. Out of the ten trains that enter the station, nine of them are China Railway High-speed trains (designated by "D" and "G"), while the last is a "Common-Fast" train (designated by "K") originating from Dandong.

In 2016, the station is temporarily closed for construction of tracks and platforms for the Qingdao-Jinan high-speed railway. It was reopened in 2018, along with the opening of the new high-speed railway.

== Qingdao Metro ==
Jiaozhou North Railway Station 胶州北站
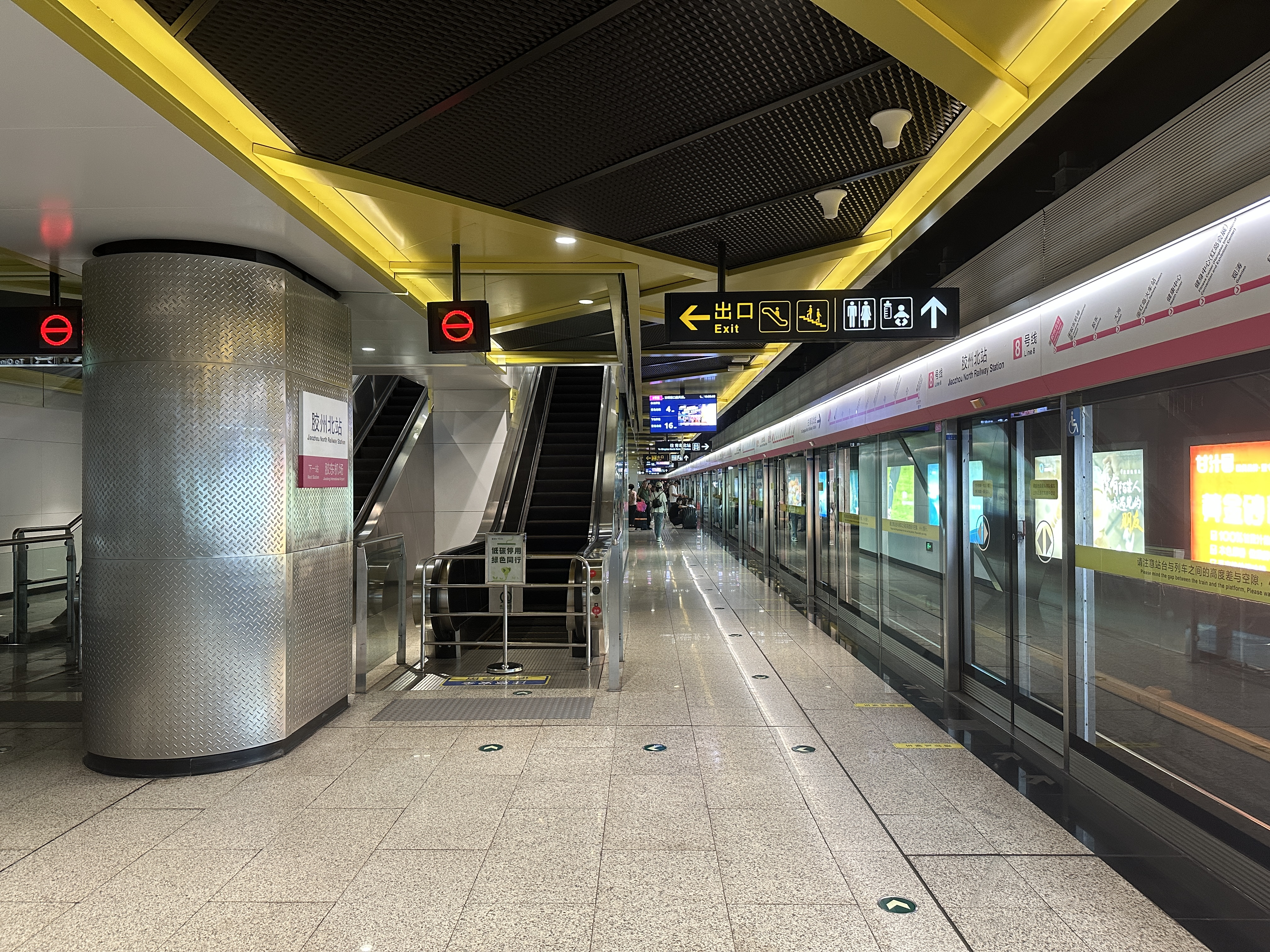

General information
- Location: Jiaozhou, Qingdao, Shandong; China
- Operator: Qingdao Metro Corporation
- Line: Line 8
- Platforms: 2 (1 island platform)

History
- Opened: 24 December 2020

Services
Preceding station	Qingdao Metro	Following station
Terminus	Line 8	Jiaodong International Airport towards Qingdao North Railway Station
Location

Jiaozhou North Railway Station (Chinese: 胶州北站) is a station on Line 8 of the Qingdao Metro. It opened on 24 December 2020. It is located in Licang District and it serves Jiaozhou North railway station.

=== Gallery ===
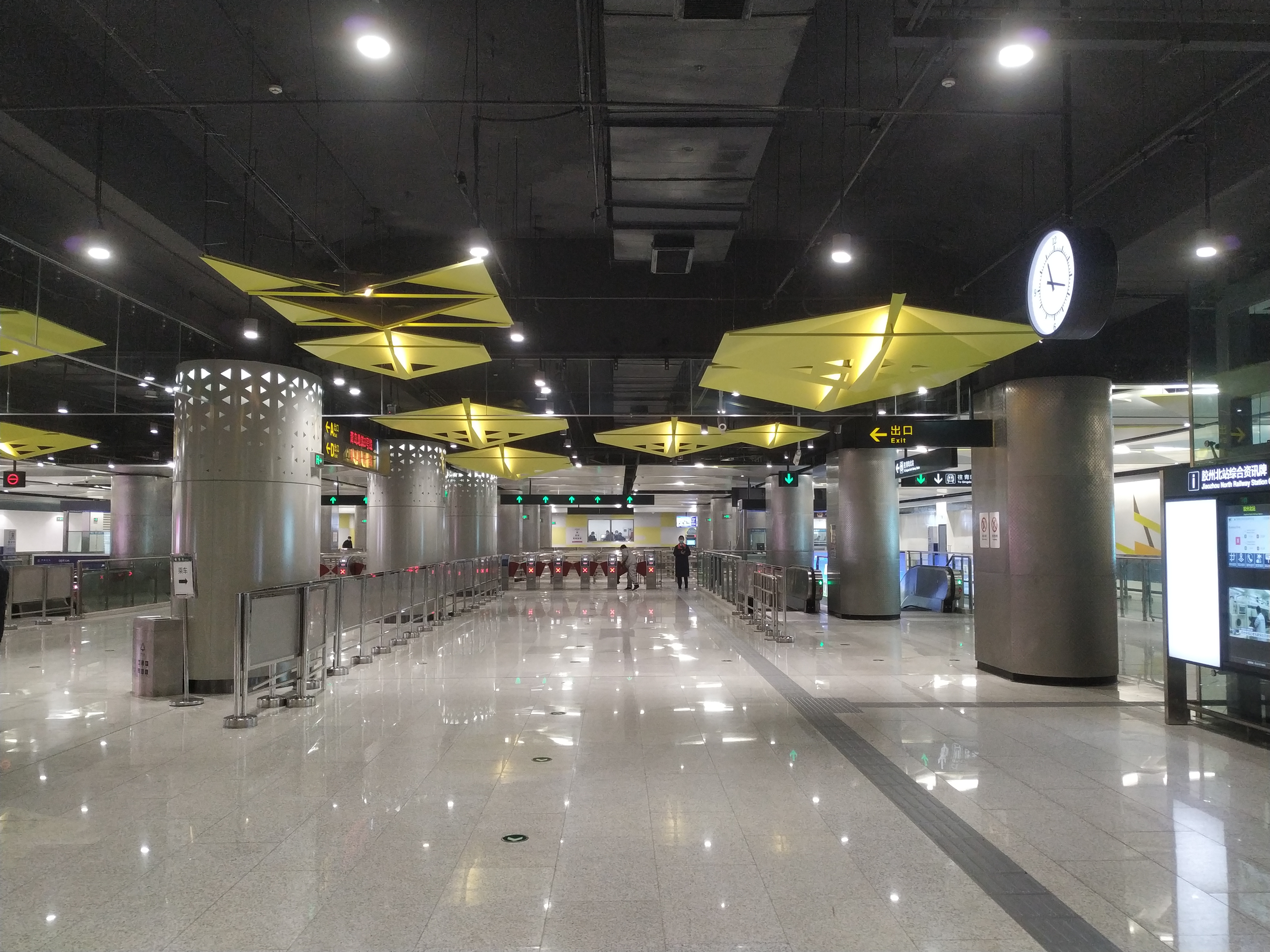
Concourse
