= Xinghua Road Subdistrict, Qingdao =

Xinghua Road Subdistrict 兴华路街道
- Subdistrict
- Location in Qingdao Xinghua Road Subd (Shandong) Xinghua Road Subd (China)
- Coordinates: 36°10′55″N 120°23′01″E
- Country: People's Republic of China
- Province: Shandong
- Sub-provincial city: Qingdao
- District: Licang
- Village-level divisions: 7 residential communities
- Elevation: 22 m (72 ft)
- Time zone: UTC+8 (China Standard)
- Postal code: 266000
- Area code: 0532

Xinghua Road Subdistrict (simplified Chinese: 兴华路街道; traditional Chinese: 興華路街道; pinyin: Xīnghuá Lù Jiēdào) is a subdistrict of western Licang District, Qingdao, People's Republic of China. As of 2011, it has seven residential communities (社区) under its administration.

== See also ==
- List of township-level divisions of Shandong
