= Hongdao railway station =

Railway station in Qingdao, Shandong

Hongdao 红岛
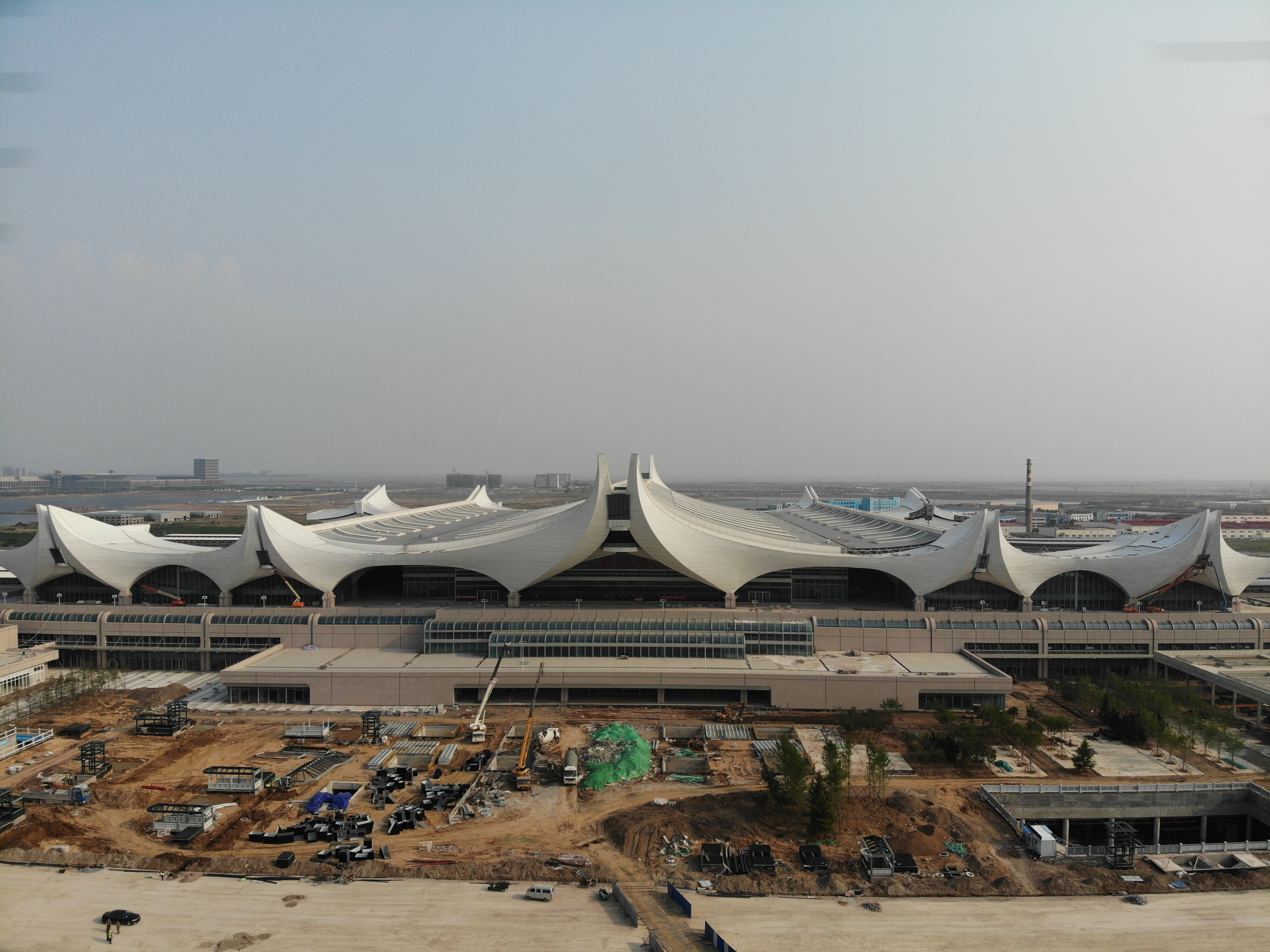
- The station under construction in 2020

General information
- Location: Hetao Subdistrict, Chengyang District, Qingdao, Shandong; China
- Lines: China Railway: Jinan–Qingdao high-speed railway Qingdao–Yancheng railway Qingdao Metro: Line 8

Other information
- Station code: Station: 17623; Telegraph: HQK; Pinyin: HDA

History
- Opened: 24 December 2020; 5 years ago (Qingdao Metro Line 8); 1 July 2023; 3 years ago (high-speed rail)
Location

Hongdao railway station (Chinese: 红岛站; pinyin: Hóngdǎo zhàn) is a railway station in Hetao Subdistrict, Chengyang District, Qingdao, Shandong, China. The metro station opened on 24 December 2020 and the high-speed rail station opened on 1 July 2023.

== History ==
=== China Railway ===
Both the Jinan–Qingdao high-speed railway and the Qingdao–Yancheng railway opened on 26 December 2018, however Hongdao railway station had not been completed. The high-speed rail station opened on 1 July 2023.

=== Qingdao Metro ===
The metro station on Line 8 of the Qingdao Metro on 24 December 2020. Line 10 and 12 of Qingdao Metro, part of Qingdao Metro's long-term plan, will also serve this station.

== See also ==
- Qingdao West Railway Station
- Qingdao Railway Station
- Qingdao North Railway Station
- Qingdao Airport railway station

Preceding station	China Railway High-speed	Following station
Qingdao North Terminus	Qingdao–Yancheng railway	Qingdao West towards Yancheng
Qingdao Airport towards Jinan East	Jinan–Qingdao high-speed railway	Qingdao North Terminus
