= Qingdao North railway station =

Railway and metro station in Qingdao, China

Qingdaobei 青岛北
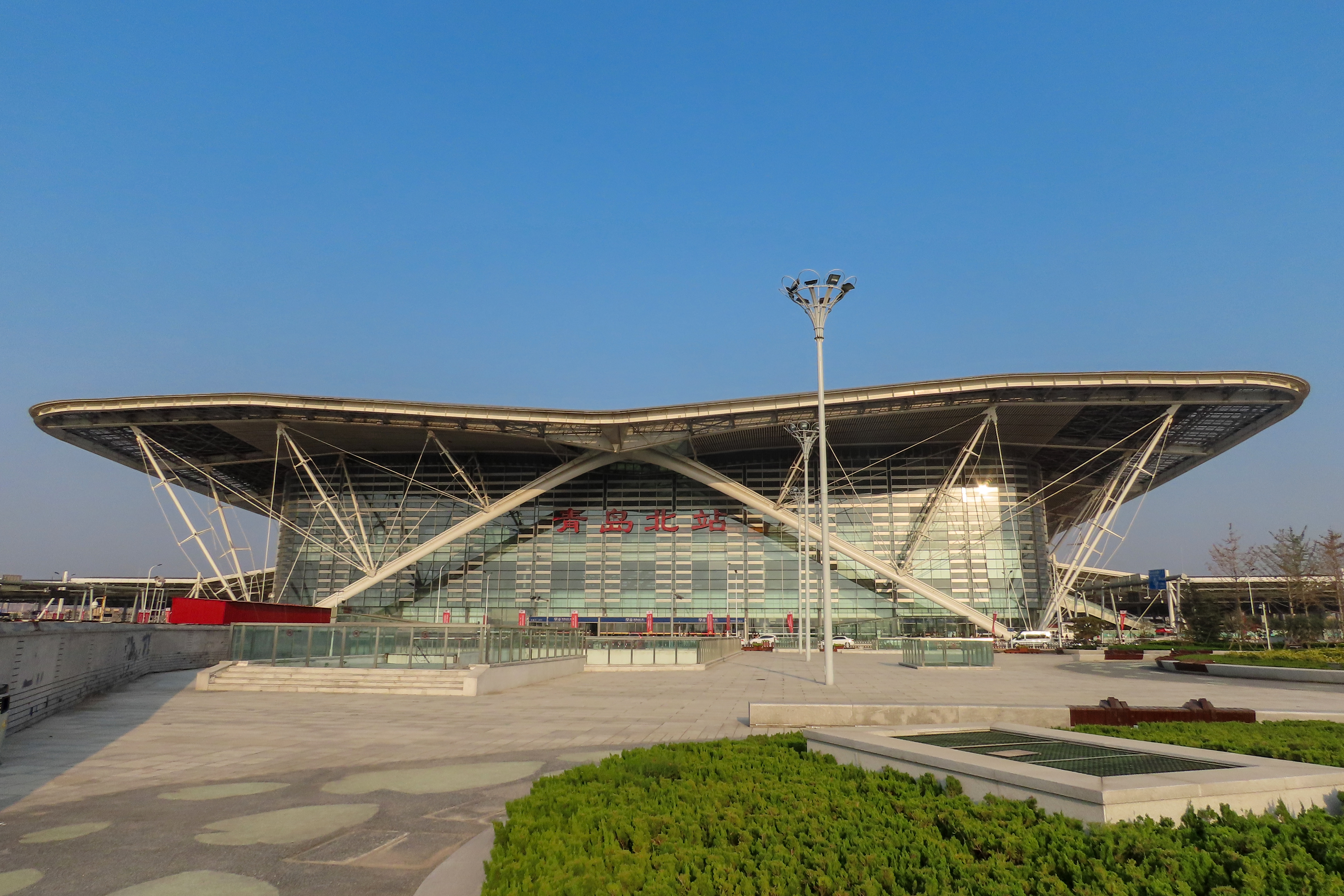

General information
- Other names: Qingdao North
- Location: Jingle Road (静乐路), Licang District, Qingdao, Shandong; China
- Coordinates: 36°10′9″N 120°22′18″E
- Operator: CR Jinan; China Railway Corporation
- Lines: Qingdao–Jinan railway; Qingdao–Jinan passenger railway; Qingdao–Rongcheng intercity railway; Qingdao–Yancheng railway; Qingdao-Jinan high-speed railway
- Platforms: 14 (7 island platforms, 2 side platforms)
- Connections: Bus terminal

Other information
- Station code: China Railway; TMIS code: 18088; Telegraph code: QHK; Pinyin code: QDB; Qingdao Metro: 127 (Line 1); 322 (Line 3); 811 (Line 8)
- Classification: 1st class station

History
- Opened: 10 January 2014; 12 years ago

Services
| Preceding station | China Railway High-speed | Following station |
|---|---|---|
| Qingdao Terminus | Qingdao–Jinan passenger railway | Jiaozhoubei towards Jinan |
Location

Qingdaobei (Qingdao North) railway station (simplified Chinese: 青岛北站; traditional Chinese: 青島北站; pinyin: Qīngdǎoběi zhàn) is a railway station in Qingdao, Shandong, China.

Qingdaobei Station is one of the terminal stations of CRH trains (denoted with letter G and D) bound for Qingdao city from major cities in China. Intercity CRH trains running on Qingdao-Rongcheng Intercity Railway (denoted with letter C) and newly scheduled common passenger trains also end their journey here rather than overloaded Qingdao station.

The main roof surface is 72,800 square metres (784,000 sq ft), covering the 44,000-square-metre (470,000 sq ft) main hall.

== Design ==
Designed by AREP and MaP3 during a competition in 2007, the station is built on reclaimed land from the sea. The project was inspired by marina's landscape (seagulls, boat masts, cables). The structure shape was obtained by moving and rotating identical frames: "arches" and roof beams, connected together by braced brackets and cables diagonals. Arches and beams are welded on a central beam, with a triangular box section, sheltering technical catwalk. The whole structure is fabricated with folded steel sheets. The roofing is made by aluminium plates interrupted by polycarbonate strips. The ceiling is made of aluminium blades.

== Construction ==
The construction is handled by CSCEC, general contractor. The steel structure was fabricated in Nanjing.

== Gallery ==
Concourse

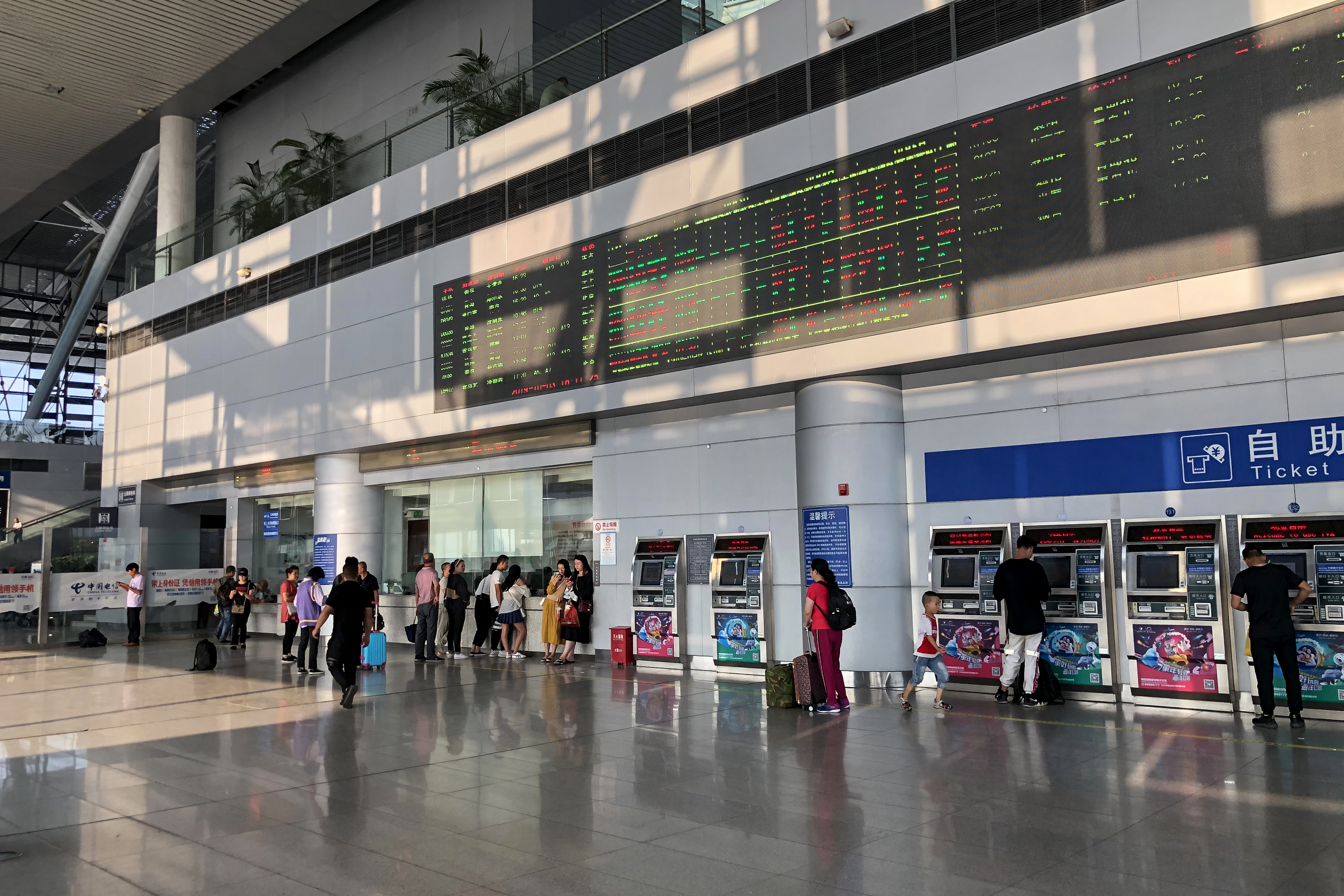
Ticket office

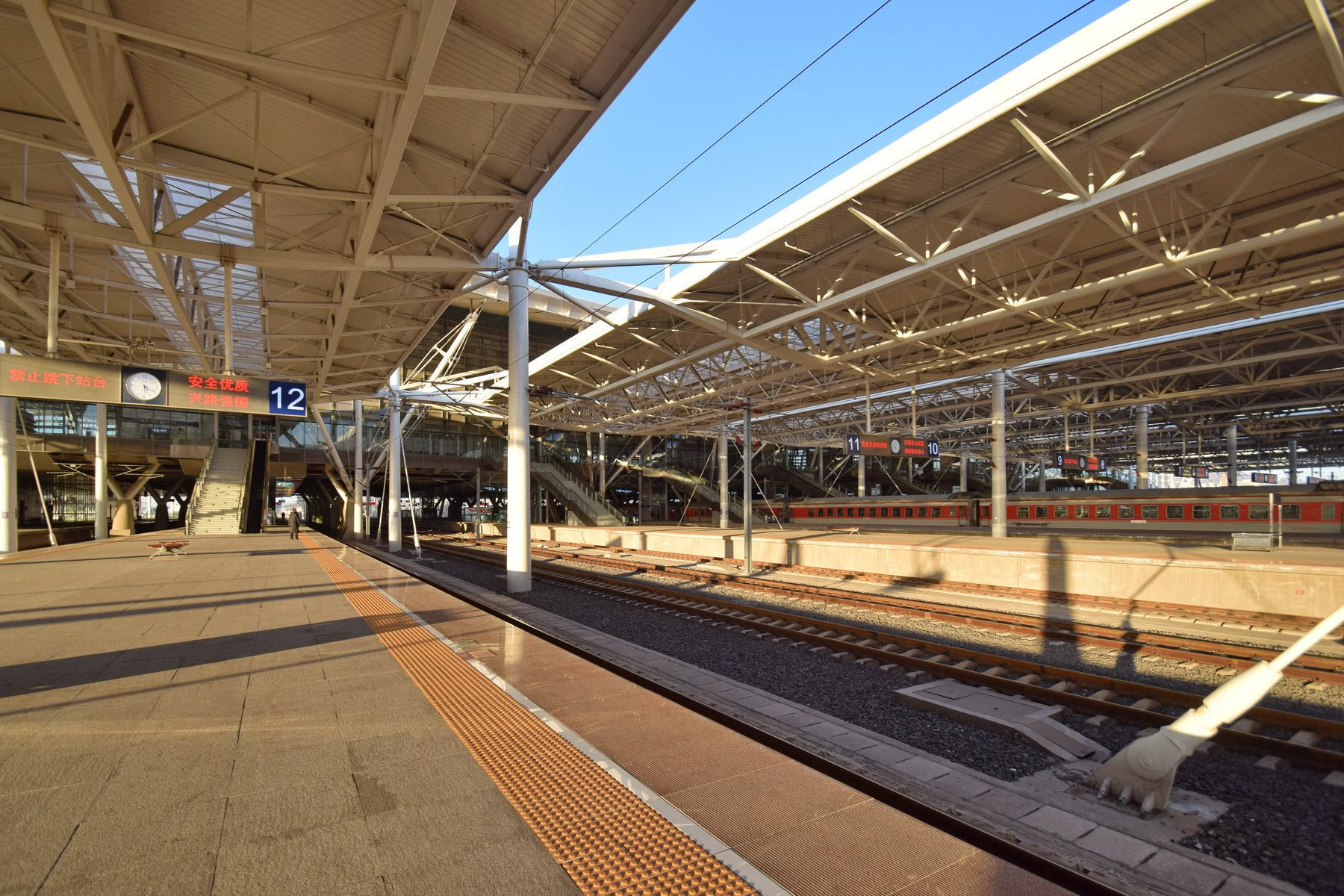
Railway platforms

== Qingdao Metro ==
Qingdao North Railway Station 青岛北站
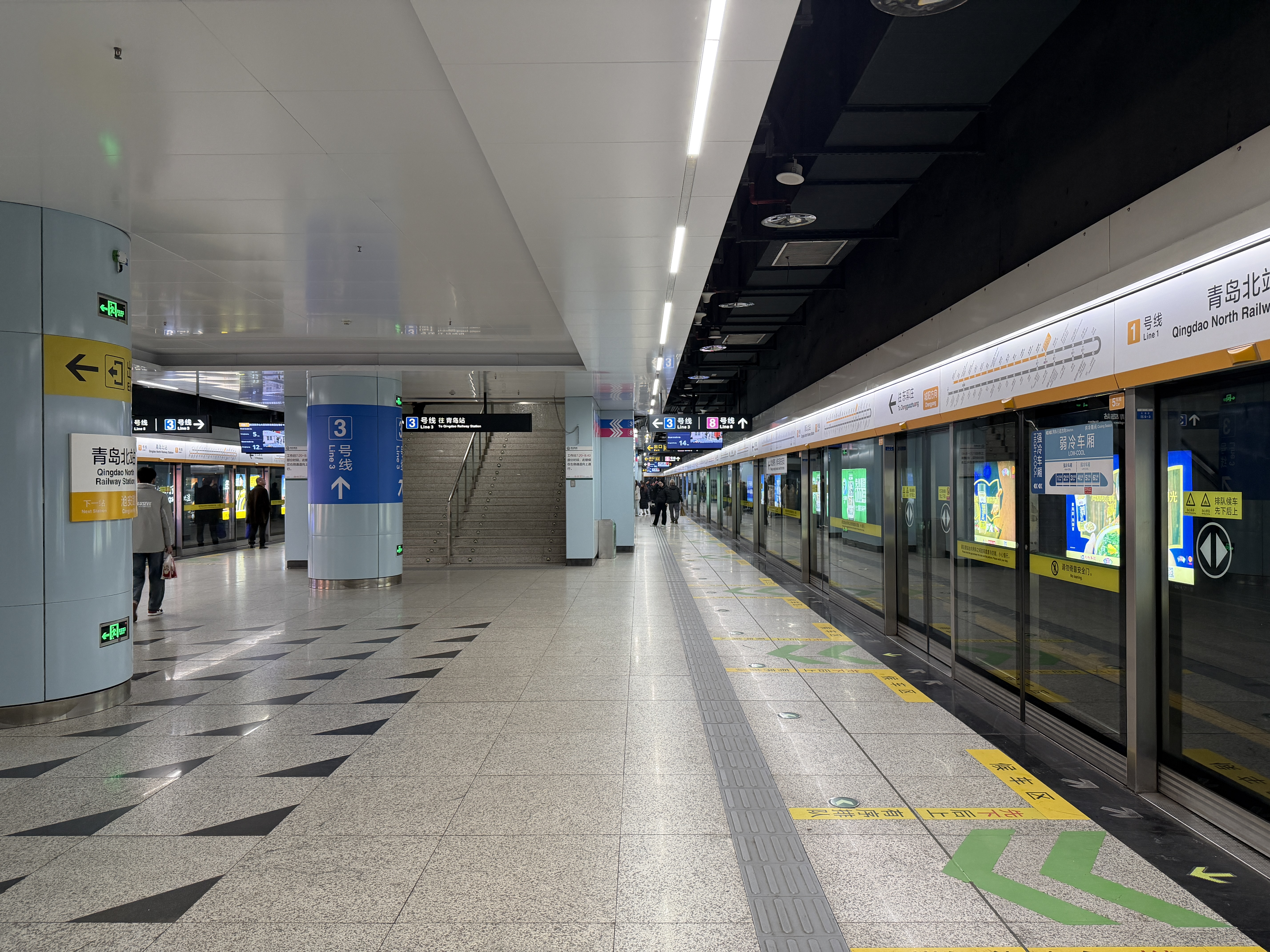
- Line 1 platform

General information
- Location: Licang District, Qingdao, Shandong; China
- Operator: Qingdao Metro Corporation
- Lines: Line 1 Line 3 Line 8
- Platforms: 6 (3 island platforms)

History
- Opened: 16 December 2015; 10 years ago

Services
| Preceding station | Qingdao Metro | Following station |
|---|---|---|
| Anshun Road towards Wangjiagang | Line 1 | Cang'an Road towards Dongguozhuang |
| Yongping Road towards Qingdao Railway Station | Line 3 | Terminus |
| Dayang towards Jiaozhou North Railway Station | Line 8 | Terminus |
Location

Qingdao North Railway Station (Chinese: 青岛北站) is a station on Line 1, Line 3 and Line 8 of the Qingdao Metro. It opened on 16 December 2015. It is located in Licang District and it serves Qingdao North (Qingdaobei) railway station.

=== Gallery ===
Entrance A

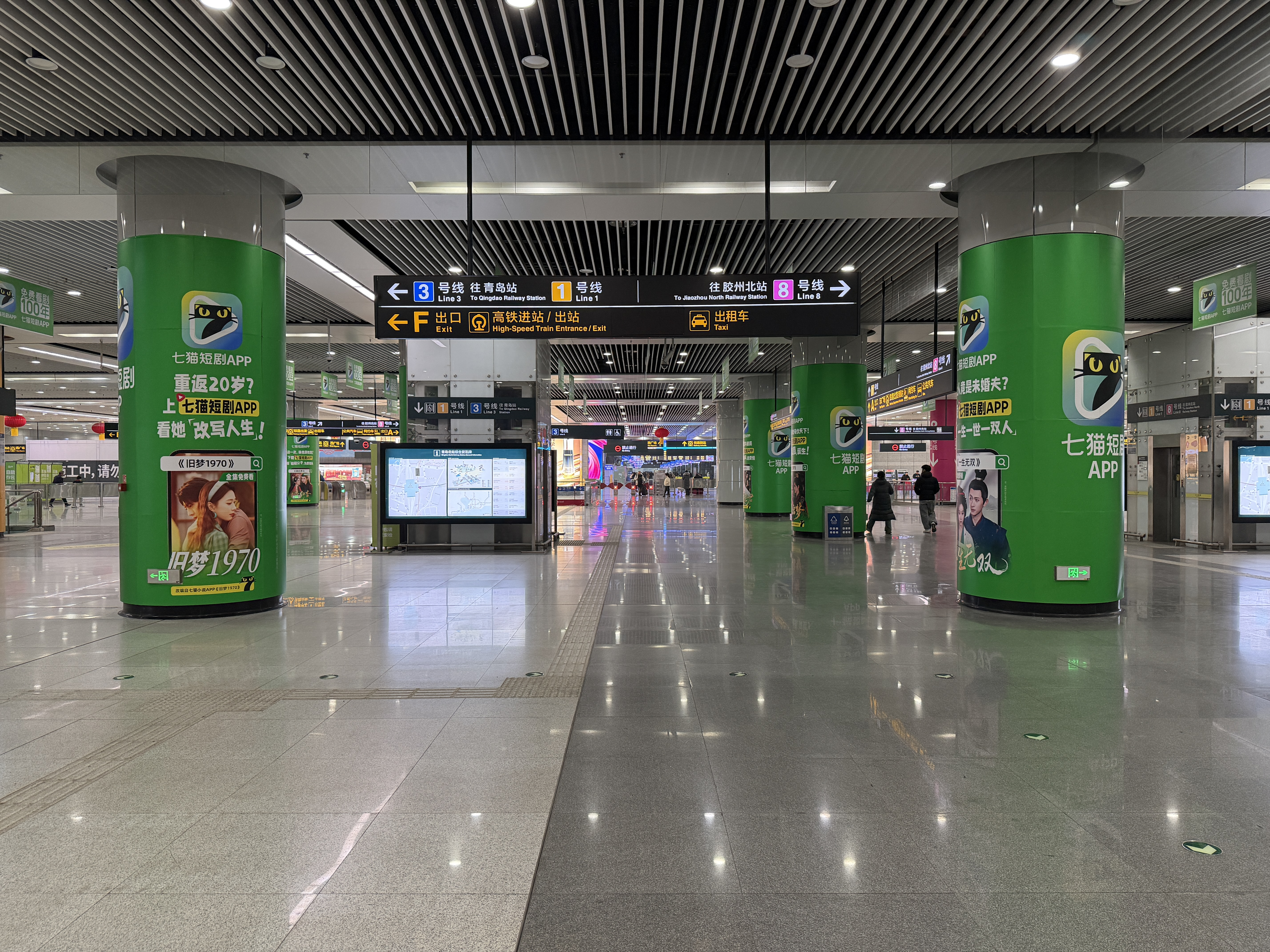
Concourse

== See also ==
- Qingdao Airport railway station
- Qingdao West Railway Station
- Qingdao Railway Station
- Hongdao Railway Station
