= Qingdao–Yancheng railway =

High speed rail line in China

Qingdao–Yancheng railway 青盐铁路
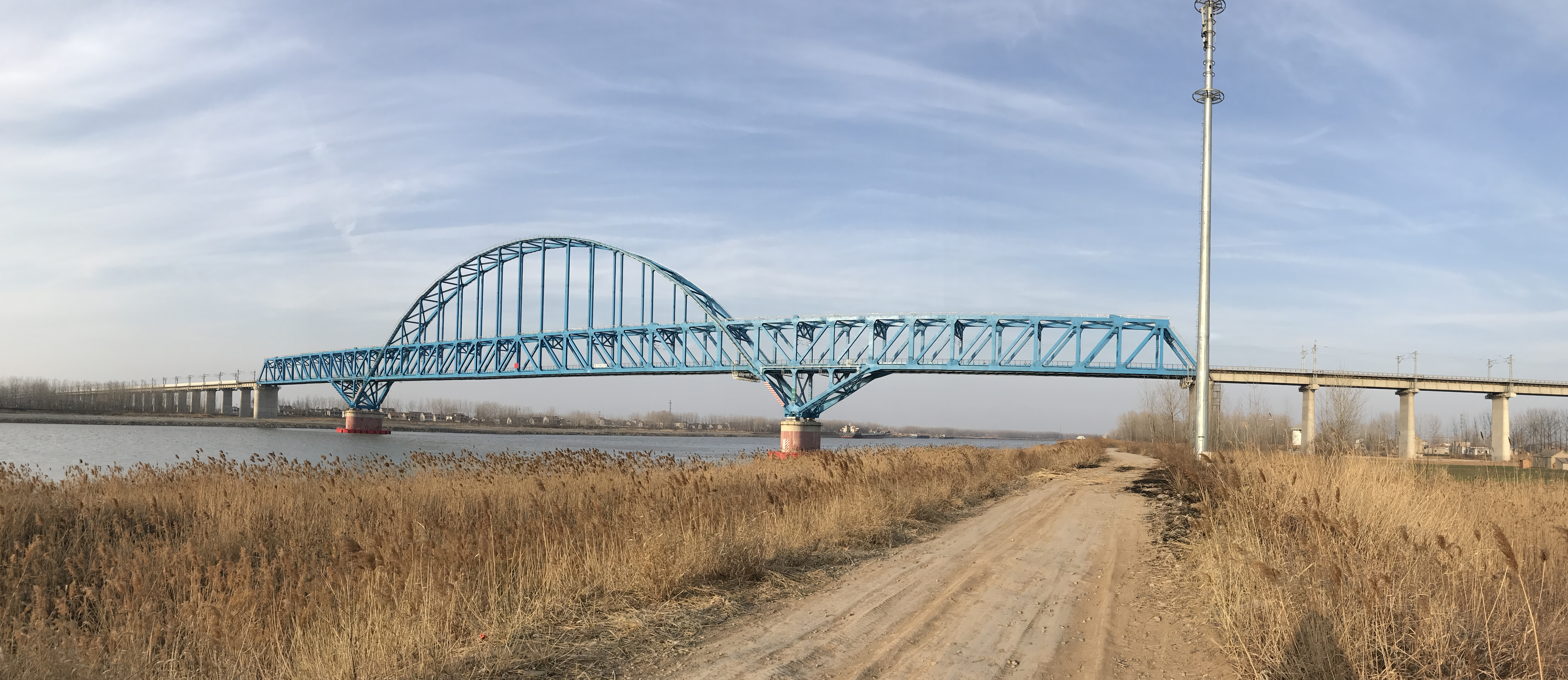

Overview
- Status: Operating
- Termini: Qingdao North; Yancheng
- Stations: 12

Service
- Type: Higher-speed rail
- Operator(s): China Railway Jinan Group & China Railway Shanghai Group

History
- Opened: 26 December 2018

Technical
- Line length: 429 km (267 mi)
- Track gauge: 1,435 mm (4 ft 8 1/2 in)
- Operating speed: 200 km/h (124 mph)

The Qingdao–Yancheng railway is a higher-speed railway on the eastern coast of China. It is 429 km (267 mi) long and has a maximum speed of 200 km/h (124 mph).

== History ==
The railway opened on 26 December 2018.

From 30 December 2018, Yancheng North railway station was closed for passenger service and the southern terminus of the line changed to Yancheng railway station.

== Stations ==
Station Name	Chinese	Metro transfers/connections	China Railway transfers/connections
Qingdao North		1 3 8	
Hongdao		8	
Yanghekou
Qingdao West
Dongjiakou		West Coast	
Liangcheng
Rizhao West
Lanshan West
Ganyu North
Ganyu
Lianyungang
Dongji
Guanyun East
Tianlou
Xiangshuixian
Binhaigang
Funing East
Sheyang
Yancheng
