= Qingdao Airport railway station =

Railway station in Jiaozhou, Qingdao

Qingdao Airport 青岛机场
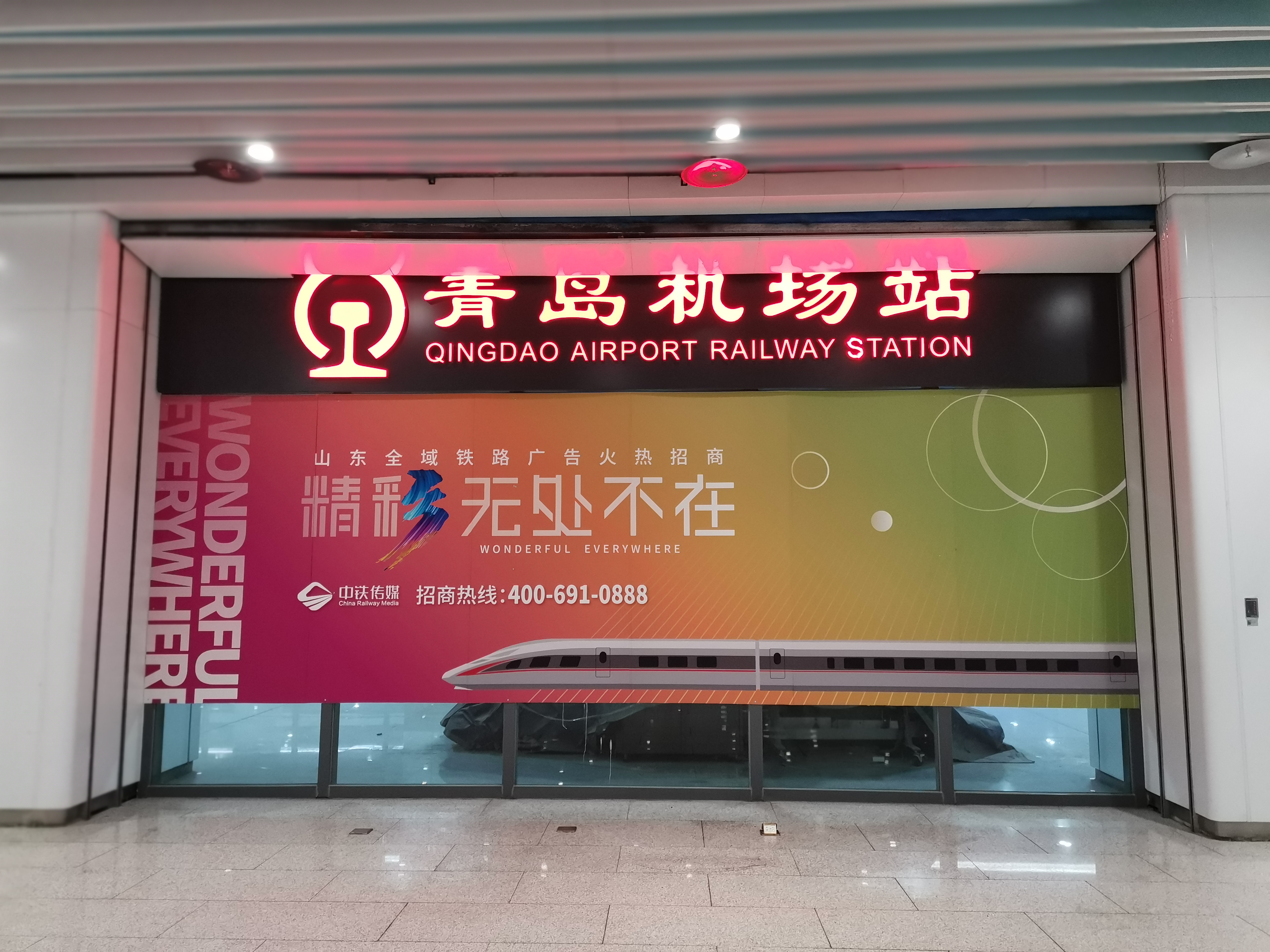

General information
- Location: Jiaozhou, Qingdao, Shandong; China
- Coordinates: 36°21′39.16″N 120°5′20.54″E
- Line: Jinan–Qingdao high-speed railway
- Connections: Qingdao Jiaodong International Airport

History
- Opened: 9 August 2021
Location

Qingdao Airport railway station is a railway station in Jiaozhou, Qingdao, Shandong, China. It is connected to Qingdao Jiaodong International Airport.

== History ==
On 9 August 2021, the railway station on Jinan–Qingdao high-speed railway opened.

== See also ==
- Qingdao Railway Station
- Qingdao North Railway Station
- Qingdao West Railway Station
- Hongdao Railway Station

Preceding station	China Railway High-speed	Following station
Jiaozhou North towards Jinan East	Jinan–Qingdao high-speed railway	Hongdao towards Qingdao North
