= Yanji Chaoyangchuan International Airport =

Airport in Yanji, Jilin, China

Yanji Chaoyangchuan International Airport 延吉朝阳川国际机场 연길조양천국제공항
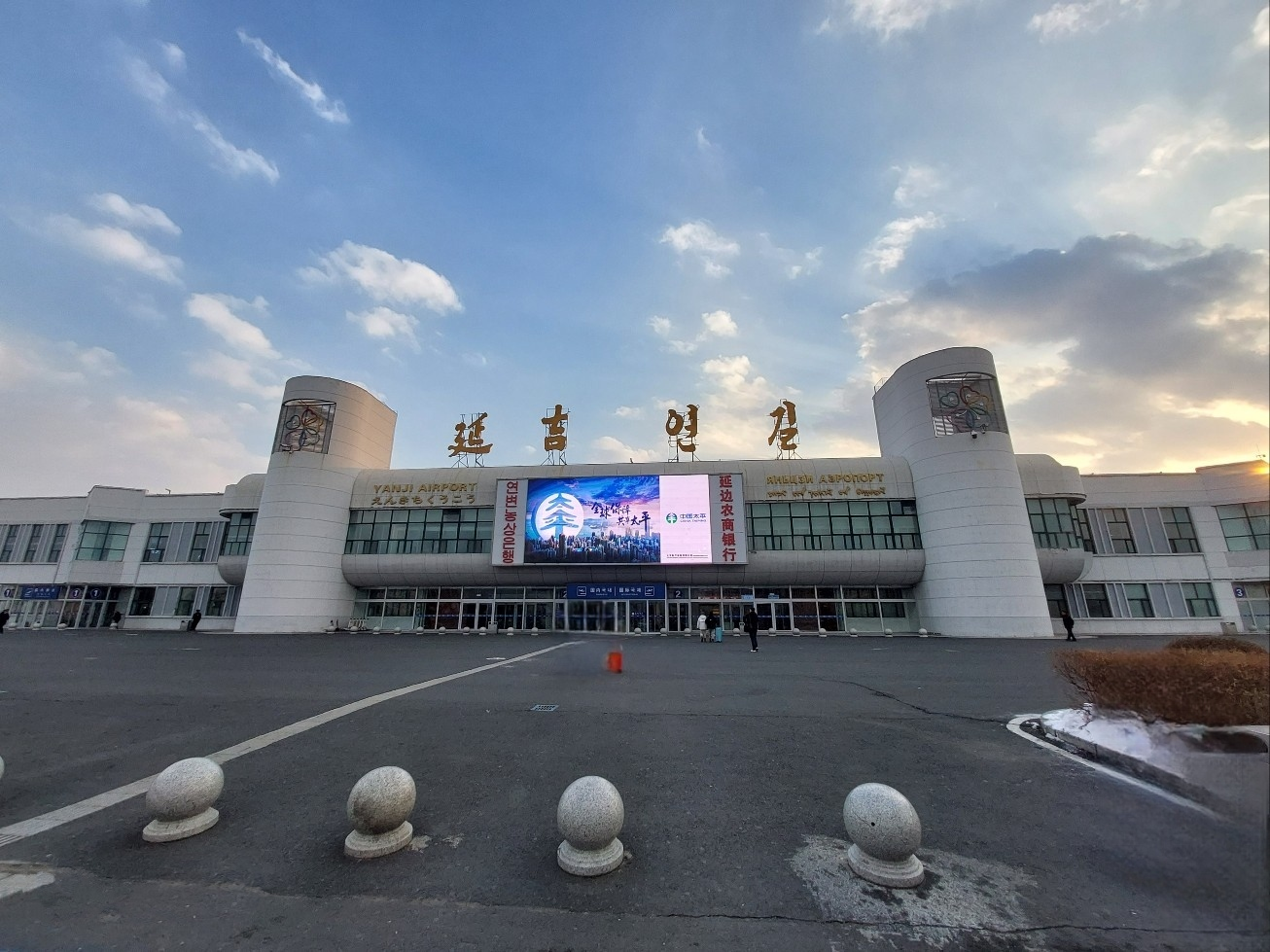
- IATA: YNJ; ICAO: ZYYJ

Summary
- Airport type: Public
- Serves: Yanji, Jilin
- Location: Chaoyangchuan Town, Longjing
- Opened: 29 August 1985; 41 years ago
- Built: 1952; 74 years ago
- Elevation AMSL: 190 m (620 ft)
- Coordinates: 42°52′58″N 129°27′04″E

Map
- Location in Jilin YNJ/ZYYJ (China)

Runways
Direction	Length		Surface
Direction	m	ft	Surface
09/27	2,600	8,530	Concrete

Statistics (2025)
- Passengers: 1,383,620
- Aircraft movements: 10,369
- Cargo (metric tons): 2,783.5
- Source: List of the busiest airports in the People's Republic of China

Yanji Chaoyangchuan International Airport
- Simplified Chinese: 延吉朝阳川国际机场
- Traditional Chinese: 延吉朝陽川國際機場
Transcriptions
Standard Mandarin
- Hanyu Pinyin: Yánjí Cháoyángchuān Guójì Jīchǎng

Chinese Korean name
- Chosŏn'gŭl: 연길조양천국제공항
- Hancha: 延吉朝陽川國際空港
Transcriptions
- Revised Romanization: Yeongil Joyangcheon Gonghang
- McCune–Reischauer: Yŏngil Choyangch'ŏn Konghang

South Korean name
- Hangul: 옌지 차오양촨 국제공항
Transcriptions
- Revised Romanization: Yenji Chaoyangchwan Gukjegonghang
- McCune–Reischauer: Yenji Ch'aoyangch'wan Gukchegonghang

Yanji Chaoyangchuan International Airport (IATA: YNJ, ICAO: ZYYJ) is an airport serving the city of Yanji in Jilin province of Northeast China. A project to relocate the airport by 2029 is underway; the airport will be renamed to Yanji Jindalai International Airport (연길진달래국제공항) after the relocation.

== History ==
Yanji Airport was built in 1952 during the Korean War and was initially a small military airport.

In the 1980s, with the opening up of Yanbian Prefecture, the local government hoped to use the Yanji Airport of the Air Force to open civil aviation flights. After the local government's efforts, the State Council and the Central Military Commission approved the use of the Chaoyangchuan Airport of the Air Force for civil aviation to be converted into a joint military-civilian airport on April 12, 1985. On June 2 of the same year, a certain unit of the Chinese People's Liberation Army and the Yanbian Korean Autonomous Prefecture Government officially signed the "Agreement on the Use of Chaoyangchuan Airport of the Air Force by Civil Aviation": the Air Force allowed civil aviation to use the runway free of charge and allocated land to Yanbian to build the waiting hall free of charge; the Civil Aviation Administration of China provided the airport with navigation equipment and professional and technical personnel. The total construction cost amounts to just over 7 million RMB, with the expenses for key facilities — including the terminal building, the civil aviation staff dormitory, and the apron — covered by Yanbian Prefecture.

On July 1, 1985, the Civil Aviation Yanji Station was established. On August 29 of the same year, the An-24 passenger plane made its maiden flight on the Yanji-Shenyang route, thus ending the history of Yanbian having no civil aviation flights. The terminal building of Yanji Airport was built in 1987 and completed in September 1988, covering an area of 2,009 square meters.

In early 1991, in accordance with the requirements of the new situation of development and opening up of the lower reaches of the Tumen River, the airport was expanded and renovated to improve passenger transport and flight support conditions. Yanji Airport needed to be expanded to meet the growing demand.

The Yanji Airport expansion and renovation project had a total investment of 384 million yuan and was divided into two phases. Phase I commenced in May 1993, focusing on the construction of the airfield pavement. The project passed inspection and was put into operation in November of the same year, extending the runway from 2000 meters to 2600 meters. The airport was closed in mid-March, and construction officially started on May 8. It was completed at the end of October of the same year, and the project was officially accepted on November 11. It resumed operation on December 23.

The second phase of the project was the terminal building project, which started in October 1993, primarily involving the construction of a new terminal building. It was completed in April 1997 and put into operation in June 1997. The new terminal building has an area of 16,970 square meters, with 6 aircraft parking positions and 3 jet bridges. After the renovation, the number of airport routes increased from 3 to 9, and the number of airlines increased from 1 to 9.

In August 2000, the first international charter flight from Yanji to Seoul, South Korea took off. Within five years, a total of 2,211 flights departed, carrying 337,000 passengers, with a load factor of over 95%. In 1993, Yanji Airport began applying to become an airport to be designated as an international port of entry.

In June 2003, the State Council issued its approval for the opening of Yanji Airport in Jilin Province. In June 2004, Yanji Airport passed the preliminary acceptance inspection by the provincial inspection team, becoming Jilin Province's second open airport after Changchun Airport. In 2005, Yanji Airport successfully passed the final acceptance inspection, becoming Jilin Province's second international airport after Changchun Airport.

In 2008, the Yanbian Prefecture Government had begun preparations for the relocation of Yanji Airport. The Jilin Provincial Government had sent letters to the Shenyang Military Region Air Force and the Civil Aviation Administration of China to solicit opinions on the relocation and reconstruction of Yanji Airport. The preliminary work for the relocation and reconstruction of Yanji Airport was underway.

In 2011, Yanji Chaoyangchuan Airport's passenger throughput exceeded one million, making it the largest feeder airport in Northeast China. In 2012, the local government agreed to invest in the expansion of the airport. The original terminal building structure was expanded westward by 5,901.84 square meters to serve as the international flight area, and the original terminal building was renovated with a floor area of 15,755 square meters; the aviation refueling station was relocated. The expansion was completed on July 15, 2013, and the domestic renovation was completed on July 30. The international terminal area was put into use on October 13.

In 2014, Yanji Airport broke through the air traffic rights quota restrictions on South Korean routes and opened flights to small and medium-sized cities in South Korea; at the same time, it opened regular routes to Vladivostok, Russia and Pyongyang, North Korea. On July 4, 2015, the airport opened regular flights from Yanji to Osaka, Japan, and on November 3, 2016, it began operating regular flights from Yanji to Taipei.

On April 11, 2015, Yanji Chaoyangchuan International Airport officially welcomed its first batch of passengers receiving visas on arrival, marking the official commencement of its visa service. This initiative allows foreign travelers to complete entry procedures immediately at Yanji Airport, promoting tourism and trade with countries such as South Korea.

In 2017, Yanji Chaoyangchuan Airport was officially renamed "Yanji Chaoyangchuan International Airport", and is also known as the most international domestic branch airport.

In January 2020, the COVID-19 outbreak occurred in Wuhan, affecting Yanji International Airport, which did not return to normal until 2023.

On July 14, 2023, the daily passenger throughput of the airport once again exceeded 6,000. From July 1 to 15, 2023, Yanji Airport handled 594 take-offs and landings and completed a passenger throughput of 75,518, recovering to 102.1% and 101.6% of the same period in 2019, respectively. Among them, there were 418 domestic take-offs and landings and completed a passenger throughput of 50,249, recovering to 107.7% and 112.7% of the same period in 2019, respectively; and 176 international take-offs and landings and completed a passenger throughput of 25,269, recovering to 90.7% and 85.0% of the same period in 2019, respectively.

On August 20, 2025, Yanji Chaoyangchuan International Airport was closed for runway maintenance. On October 26, the airport runway maintenance project was completed and the airport resumed operation.

== New Airport ==
On September 30, 2025, the airport relocation project started and is expected to be moved to a new site in 2029. It will be renamed to Yanji Jindalai International Airport.

== Airlines and destinations ==
Airlines	Destinations
Air China	Beijing–Capital, Beijing–Daxing, Seoul–Incheon
Air Busan	Busan
Asiana Airlines	Seoul–Incheon
China Eastern Airlines	Hangzhou, Nanjing, Qingdao, Seoul–Incheon, Shanghai–Pudong, Yantai
China Southern Airlines	Changchun, Guangzhou, Qingdao, Seoul–Incheon; Seasonal: Dalian, Shenzhen
China United Airlines	Beijing–Daxing
Eastar Jet	Cheongju
Jeju Air	Seoul–Incheon
Korean Air	Seoul–Incheon
Shandong Airlines	Chongqing
Tianjin Airlines	Chongqing, Shijiazhuang, Tianjin
T'way Air	Cheongju, Daegu
XiamenAir	Fuzhou, Qingdao

== See also ==
- List of airports in China
