= Licang, Qingdao =

Licang 李沧区
- District
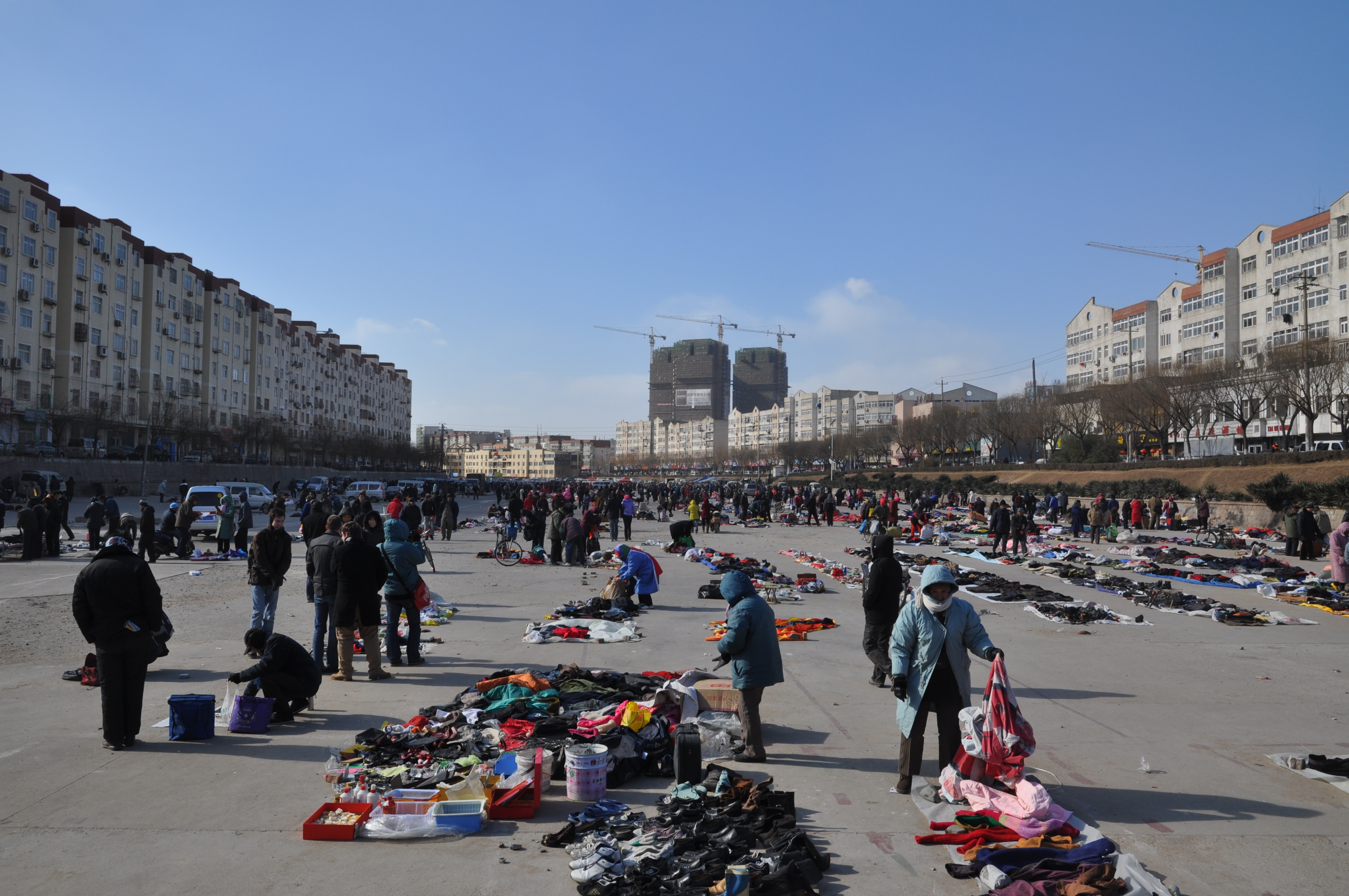

- Location in Qingdao

- Location in Shandong
- Coordinates (Heilongjiang Road): 36°10′08″N 120°26′04″E
- Country: People's Republic of China
- Province: Shandong
- Sub-provincial city: Qingdao
- Subdistricts: Neighborhoods

Area
  - Total: 95.2 km^{2} (36.8 sq mi)

Population (2019)
  - Total: 589,200
- Time zone: UTC+8 (China standard time)
- Postal code: 266041
- Website: http://www.licang.net/

Licang (Chinese: 李沧区) is an urban district (区) of Qingdao in the Chinese province of Shandong.

It is home to popular attractions such as Tea Culture Landscape Garden, Ximen Park and Sigangli Buxingjie.

In 2014 Licang hosted the main grounds for the International Horticultural Expo.

== Geography ==
The Licang district has an area of 95.52 km^{2} and according to the 2019 census has a population of 589,200 inhabitants.

== Administrative divisions ==
As of 2012, this district is divided to 11 subdistricts.

Subdistricts

- Zhenhualu Subdistrict (振华路街道)
- Yongqinglu Subdistrict (永清路街道)
- Yong'anlu Subdistrict (永安路街道)
- Xinghualu Subdistrict (兴华路街道)
- Xingchenglu Subdistrict (兴城路街道)
- Licun Subdistrict (李村街道)
- Hushanlu Subdistrict (虎山路街道)
- Fushanlu Subdistrict (浮山路街道)
- Jiushuilu Subdistrict (九水路街道)
- Xiangtanlu Subdistrict (湘潭路街道)
- Loushan Subdistrict (楼山街道)
