= Qingdao Tram =

Tram system in Qingdao, China

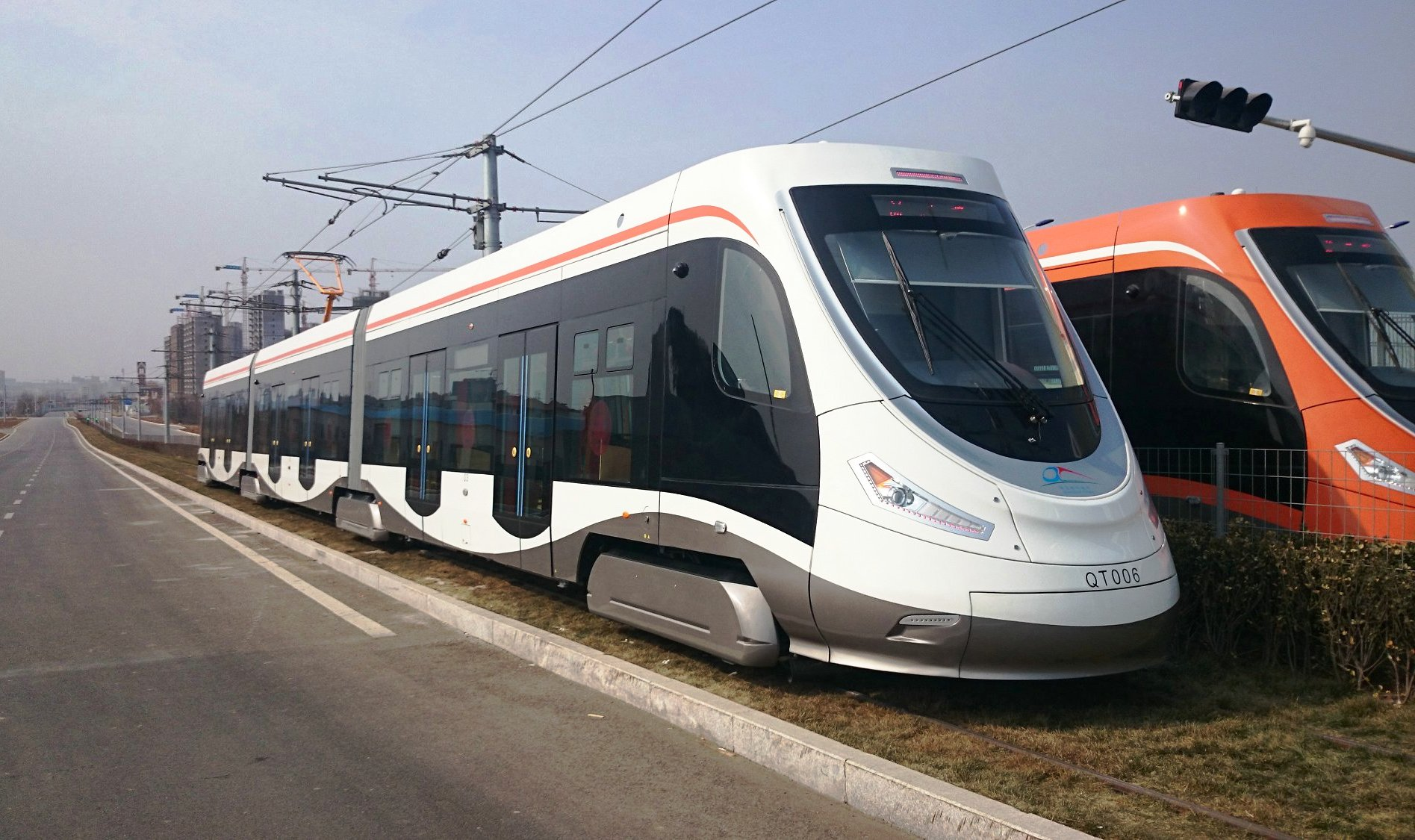

Overview
- Locale: Qingdao, China
- Transit type: Tram
- Number of lines: 1
- Number of stations: 12

Operation
- Began operation: 5 March 2016; 10 years ago
- Operators: Qingdao Public Transport Group Rail Bus Co., Ltd.
- Reporting marks: QT

Technical
- System length: 9 km (5.6 mi)
- Track gauge: 1,435 mm (4 ft 8 1/2 in) standard gauge
- Electrification: 750 V DC Overhead line

Qingdao Tram (Chinese: 青岛有轨电车) is a tram system operating in Chengyang District, Qingdao, China. It was first launched in 2016. The Qingdao Public Transport Group Rail Bus Co., Ltd. is responsible for its operation and management.

== History ==
In the 1920s, the Qingdao Municipal Government (QMG) planned to build a tramway system to replace some of the existing buses. From 1938 to 1940, Kao Electric Co., Ltd. cooperated with the QMG and set up a "tram preparation office", planning to construct the tramway system together. However, the project didn't succeed because of the lack of friction between tramway tracks and wheels due to the steep terrain in Qingdao.

In April 2013, Qingdao planned a north-south tram line with about 6 km (3.7 mi) in length, which was later changed into an east–west line in Chengyang District due to the road conditions. It was the first tramway system construction project to use the DPC (Design-Procurement-Construction) method in China. The project was completed in 2014 on 15 December. From 17 December, there were events for community outreach, publicizing the vehicle signs, body colour, and station name signs. On the morning of 28 December a no-passengers test run was carried out, then continuing to test the line, vehicle, and signal system while measuring technical parameters and adjusting as necessary, driving, crew operations.

In June 2015, the project was announced by the China Transportation Enterprises Committee as "2015 annual transport enterprises low-carbon energy-saving environmental protection outstanding project." In October, the vehicle field centre machine room axis shaft equipment debugging was completed, along with the line turnout control area joint test. On 18 December, more than 40 representatives of the public were invited to try out the tram. In January 2016, it was scheduled to carry out "three-wheel" test operation review. On 5 February, the public was allowed to ride the tram as part of a free trial experience without needing a ticket. On 24 February, the third "three-wheel" expert review was completed. On 5 March, it began a formal passenger test operation. On 8 November, the first seven cars on the line, full line with the car were in place.

== Tram route and stops ==
- 1 – Chengyang Wholesale Market to Qianwangtuan

The tram route has a total length of 9 km (5.6 mi), all at-grade at ground level. The west end of the line is street running in mixed traffic (shared right-of-way), about 400 metres (1,300 ft), the rest of the line is in a semi-private right of way alongside the inside of the roadway (vehicles may cross it when making turns at intersections). There are seven hybrid substations, double insulated elastic suspension mesh, the rated voltage is 750 V DC. The stops are - Qianwangtuan station, Tianwang Road station, Shuiku Park station, Huicheng Road Station, Qingwei Road station, Guocheng Road station, Chuncheng Road station, Changcheng Road station, Agricultural University station, Mingyang Road station, Zhengyang Road station, Chengyang Wholesale Market station, a total of 12 stops, of which Agricultural University is an interchange station with Qingdao Metro Line 1. The route will be extended to the west to Chengyang railway station.

== Fleet ==
The tram is a Škoda 15 T produced by CRRC Qingdao Sifang. The vehicle body is 2.65 m (8 ft 8 in) wide, and 35.19 m (115 ft 5 in) long. The trams have a modular design with streamlined ends and a maximum running speed of 70 km/h (43 mph). Vehicles are bi-directional and have 3 articulated sections with a total of 6 doors per side of each vehicle. The total passenger volume of each tram is over 300 people. The trams are low-floor, with the car floor 35 cm (14 in) above the ground.

== Depots ==
The system set up a depot – Qianwangtuan depot, which covers an area of 2 hectares (5 acres) and is located in the eastern end of the line at Chunyang Road and at the northwest corner of Fenghuangshan Road junction. The depot could bear the early arrival of the vehicle with the annual inspection, weekly inspection, check, parking, and daily maintenance and so on. One or two repair work was commissioned by the vehicle manufacturers to complete the Quartet.

== Alignment and interchanges ==
The modern tram routes completely run on reserved grass-bed track at middle of the road.

== Ride and ticketing system ==
The tram system uses a manual scheduling management model. Each tram is assigned one driver and three crew members, all of whom are under 35 years old and have at least two years of experience. Passengers pay upon boarding, either with coins or by swiping a card. The one-way fare is 2 yuan.

== See also ==
- Qingdao Metro
