= Chengyang =

Chengyang may refer to the following locations in China:

- Chengyang, Qingdao (城阳区), a district of Qingdao, Shandong
- Chengyang, Guangxi (程阳), scenic area in Sanjiang County, Guangxi
- Chengyang, Ju County (城阳镇), town in Ju County, Shandong
- Chengyang, Pengyang (城阳乡), a township in Pengyang County, Ningxia
