= Qingdao Liuting International Airport =

Former airport in Qingdao, Shandong, China (1944–2021)

Qingdao Liuting International Airport 青岛流亭国际机场
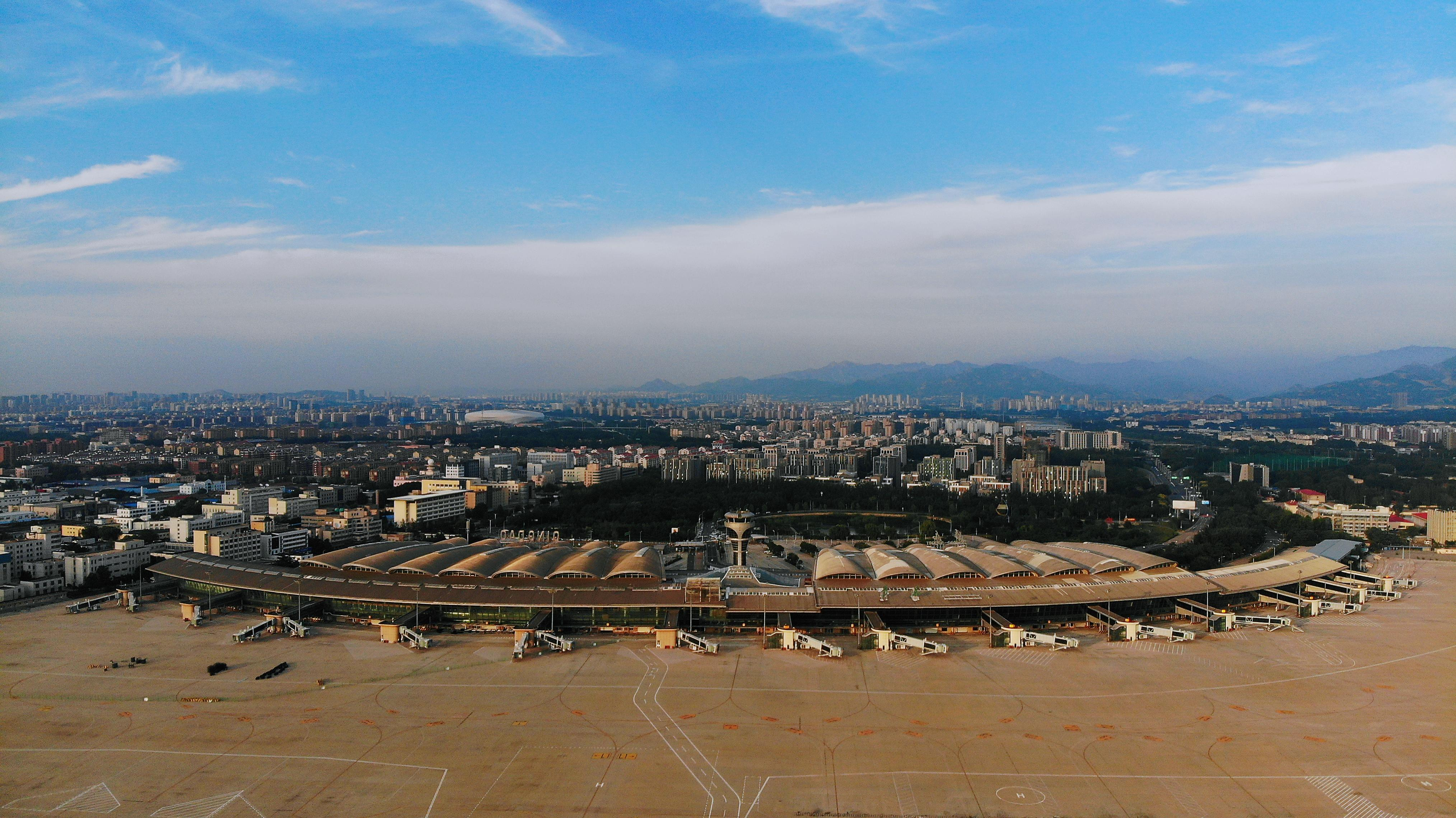
- IATA: none; ICAO: ZSQD

Summary
- Airport type: Defunct
- Operator: Qingdao International Airport Group Co., Ltd.
- Serves: Qingdao
- Location: Liuting Street, Chengyang, Qingdao, Shandong, China
- Opened: 5 August 1982 (commercial)
- Closed: 12 August 2021
- Built: 1944
- Elevation AMSL: 10 m (33 ft)
- Coordinates: 36°15′58″N 120°22′28″E

Map
- Location within Qingdao Location within Shandong Location within China

Runways
Direction	Length		Surface
Direction	m	ft	Surface
17/35	3,400	11,155	Asphalt (Closed)

Statistics (2021)
- Passengers: 16,031,973
- Cargo: 237,603 Ton
- Num. of Flights: 139,677
- Source: List of the busiest airports in China

Qingdao Liuting International Airport
- Simplified Chinese: 青岛流亭国际机场
- Traditional Chinese: 青島流亭國際機場
Transcriptions
Standard Mandarin
- Hanyu Pinyin: Qīngdǎo Liútíng Guójì Jīchǎng
- Wade–Giles: Ch'ing^{1}tao^{3} Liu^{2}t'ing^{2} Kuo^{2}chi^{4} Chi^{1}ch'ang^{3}

Qingdao Liuting International Airport (ICAO: ZSQD) was an airport that served the city of Qingdao in East China's Shandong province. It is located in Liuting Street, Chengyang District. Built in 1944, it is about 23 kilometres (14 mi) away from the center of Qingdao, and was a Class 4E civil international airport, one of the twelve major trunk airports in China.

Liuting served as a hub for Shandong Airlines, Beijing Capital Airlines and Qingdao Airlines as well as a focus city for China Eastern Airlines. It was the city's main airport until it was replaced by the newly built Qingdao Jiaodong International Airport on 12 August 2021. The IATA code TAO now points to the new airport.

== History ==
From 2004 to 2006, the airport underwent an expansion of its terminal as well as adding more parking spaces which was part of its initial 2010 goal to expand Liuting Airport to handle 5.2 million passengers annually or 2400 passengers and almost 120,000 tons of cargo hourly. The runway was also extended to its current length. Its IATA code is used for its former romanized name Tsingtao.

In 2018, Qingdao Liuting was the 15th busiest airport in China with 24.53 million passengers. Due to its lack of room to expand as it is being surrounded by the city, in December 2013, the Chinese government approved the construction of Qingdao Jiaodong International Airport. All flights were transferred to Jiaodong Airport when it opened on 12 August 2021.

Qingdao did not have a non-stop intercontinental air link until 29 March 2016, when Lufthansa's existing service to Frankfurt, Germany via Shenyang was upgraded to a non-stop flight to Frankfurt. Later in the year, Beijing Capital Airlines introduced service to Melbourne, Australia and Vancouver, Canada in early 2017.

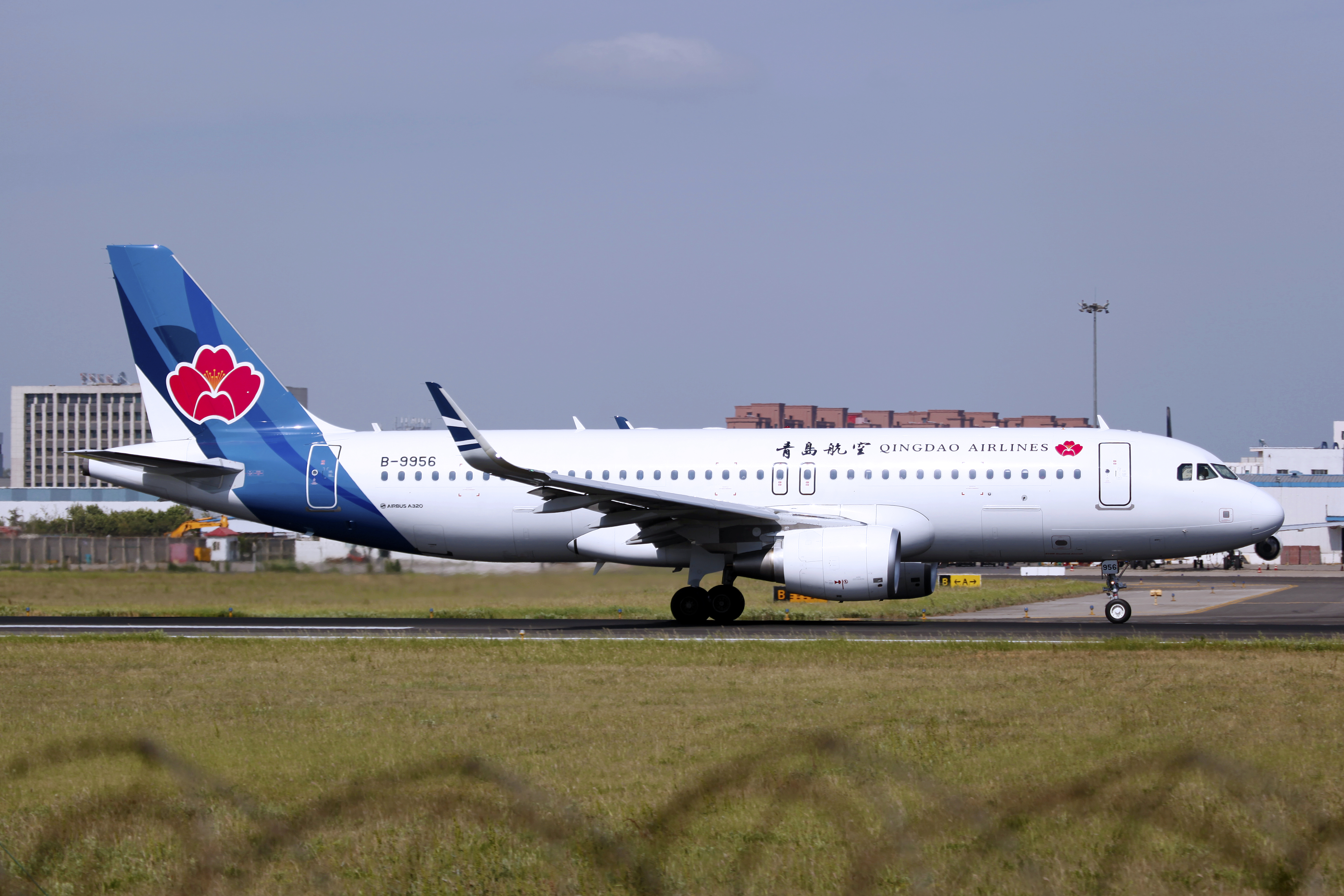
A Qingdao Airlines Airbus A320-200 taxiing at Liuting Airport in 2014.

== See also ==
- List of airports in China
- China's busiest airports by passenger traffic
