= Chengyang Bridge =

Covered bridge in Guangxi, China

Chengyang Yongji Bridge 程陽永濟橋
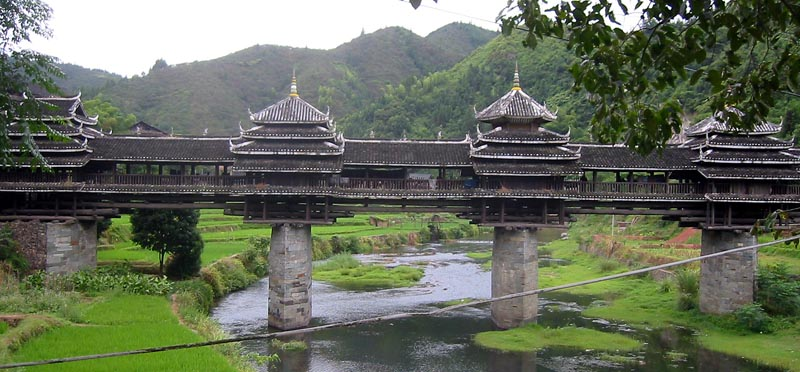
- Chengyang Wind-Rain Bridge in 2003
- Coordinates: 25°54′02″N 109°38′17″E
- Locale: Sanjiang County, Guangxi, China

Characteristics
- Design: Covered bridge
- Total length: 64.4 m (211 ft)
- Height: 10 m (33 ft)
- No. of spans: 3

History
- Construction end: 1912
- Opened: 1912

Location
- Interactive map of Chengyang Yongji Bridge 程陽永濟橋

The Yongji Bridge of Chengyang (simplified Chinese: 程阳永济桥; traditional Chinese: 程陽永濟橋; pinyin: Chéngyáng Yǒngjì Qiáo), also called the Chengyang Wind and Rain Bridge (simplified Chinese: 程阳风雨桥; traditional Chinese: 程陽風雨橋; pinyin: Chéngyáng Fēngyǔ Qiáo), is a bridge in Sanjiang County, of Guangxi, China.

Chengyang Bridge is a special covered bridge or lángqiáo, and one of several Fengyu bridges in the local Dong Minority region. It was completed in 1912. It is also called the Panlong Bridge (simplified Chinese: 盘龙桥; traditional Chinese: 盤龍橋; pinyin: Pánlóng Qiáo).

== Properties ==
The bridge is a combination of bridge, corridor, veranda and Chinese pavilion. It has two platforms (one at each end of the bridge), 3 piers, 3 spans, 5 pavilions, 19 verandas, and three floors. The piers are made of stone, the upper structures are mainly wooden, and the roof is covered with tiles. The bridge has wooden handrails on both sides.

The bridge has a total length of 64.4 metres (211 ft), and its corridor has a width of 3.4 metres (11 ft). The net height above the river is about 10 metres (33 ft).

The bridge is located in Chengyang, and serves as the link between two populous villages.

Guo Moruo, a famous Chinese author, loved the bridge at first sight and wrote a poem for it.

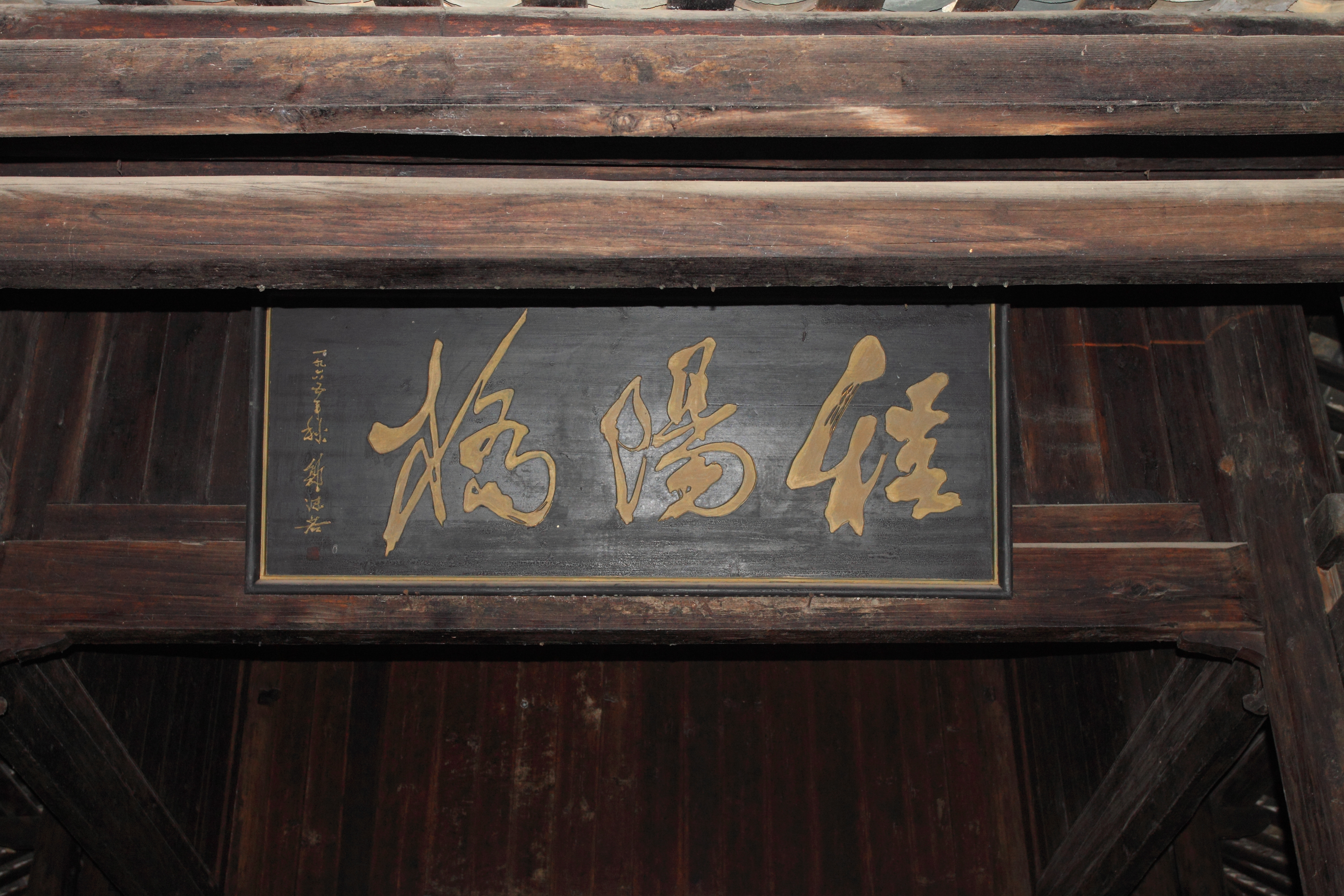
“程陽橋”, written by Guo Moruo

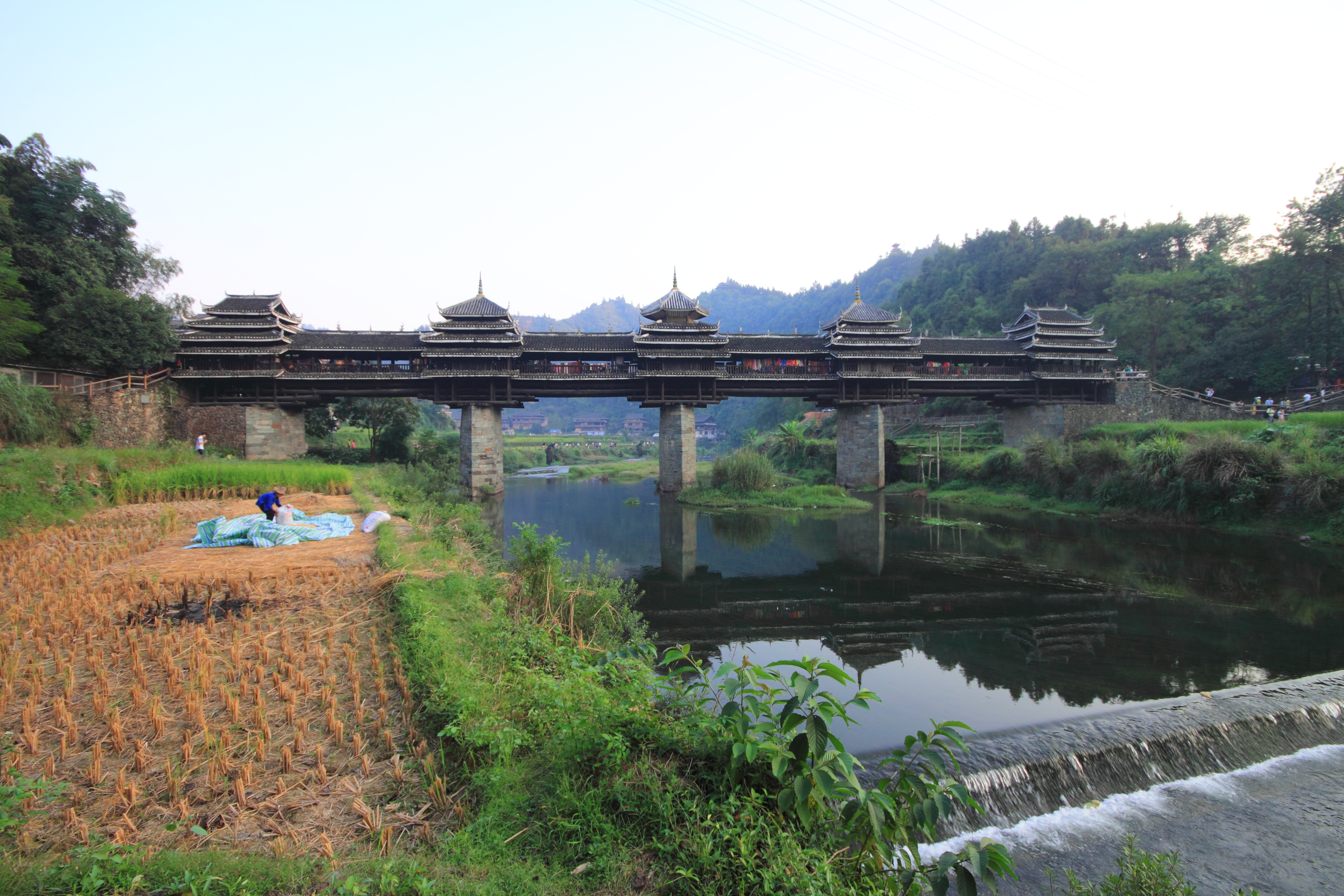
west of the bridge

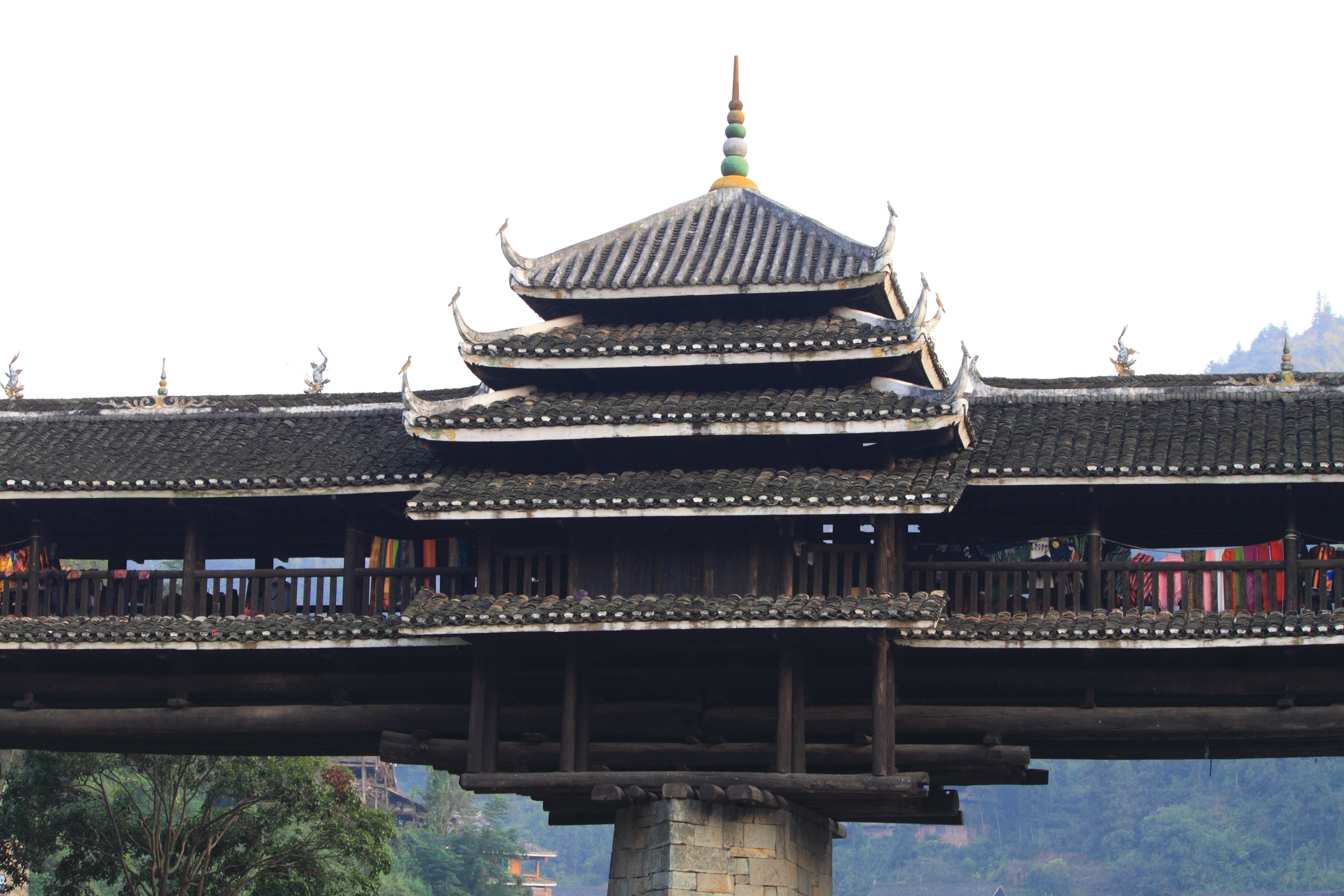

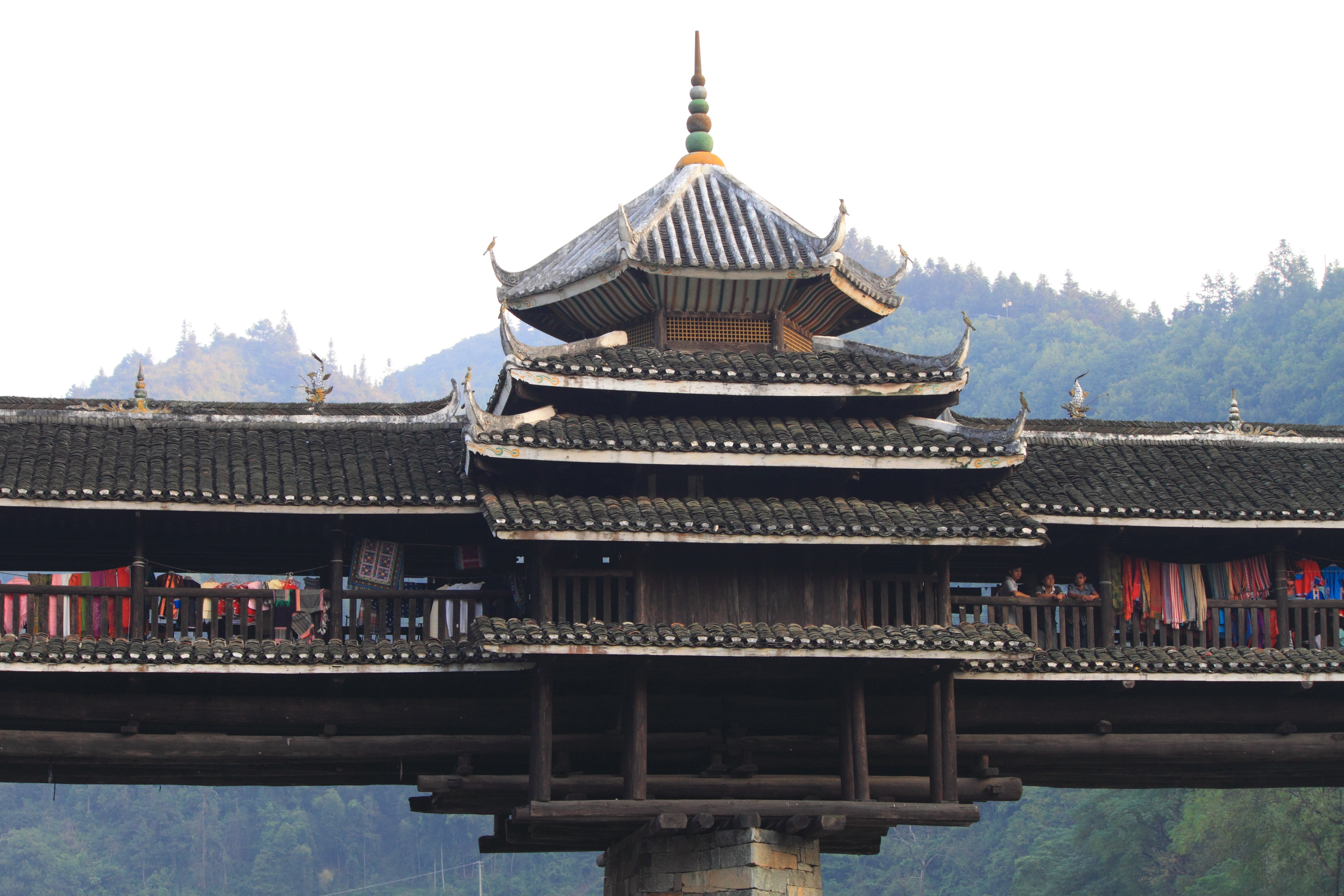

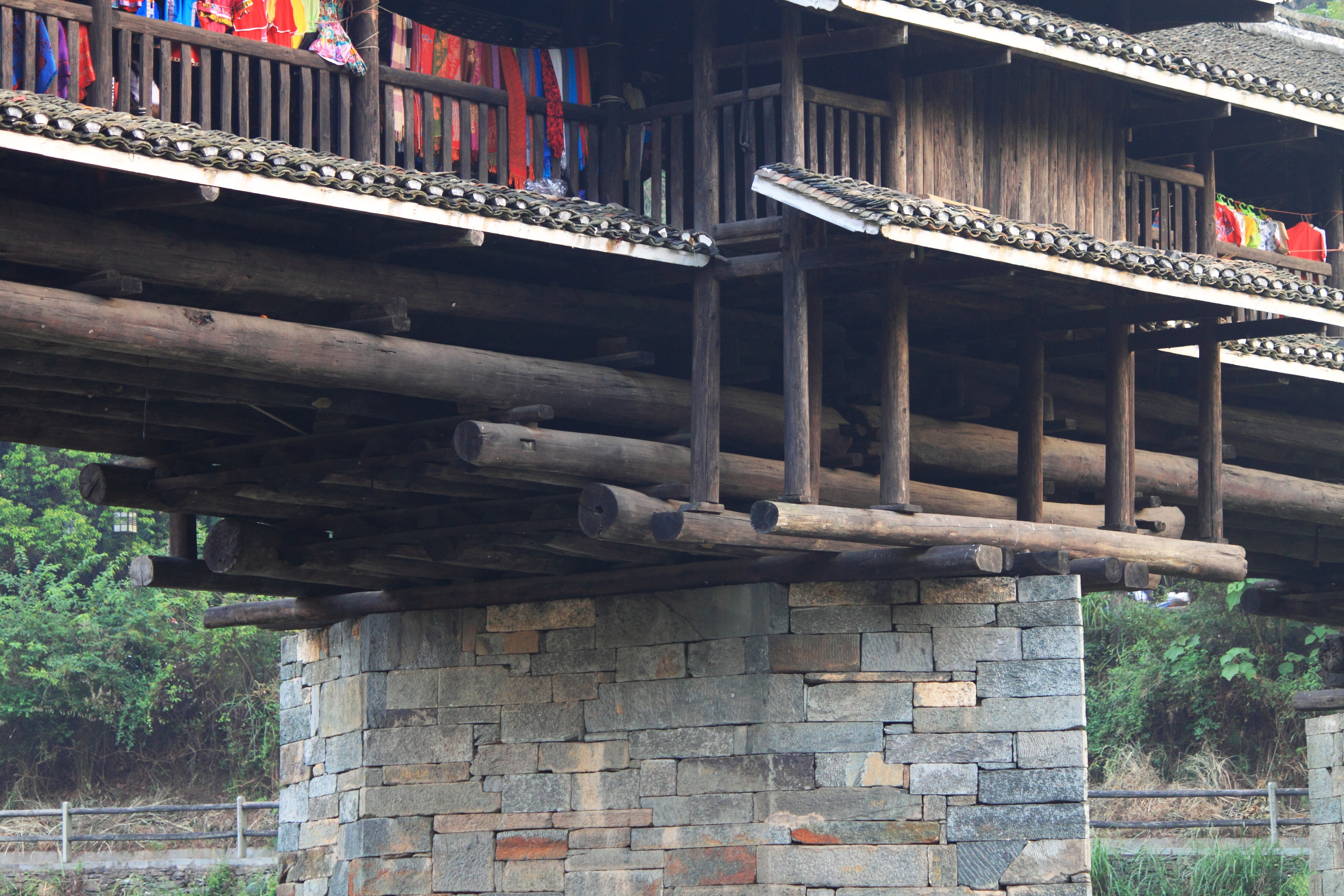

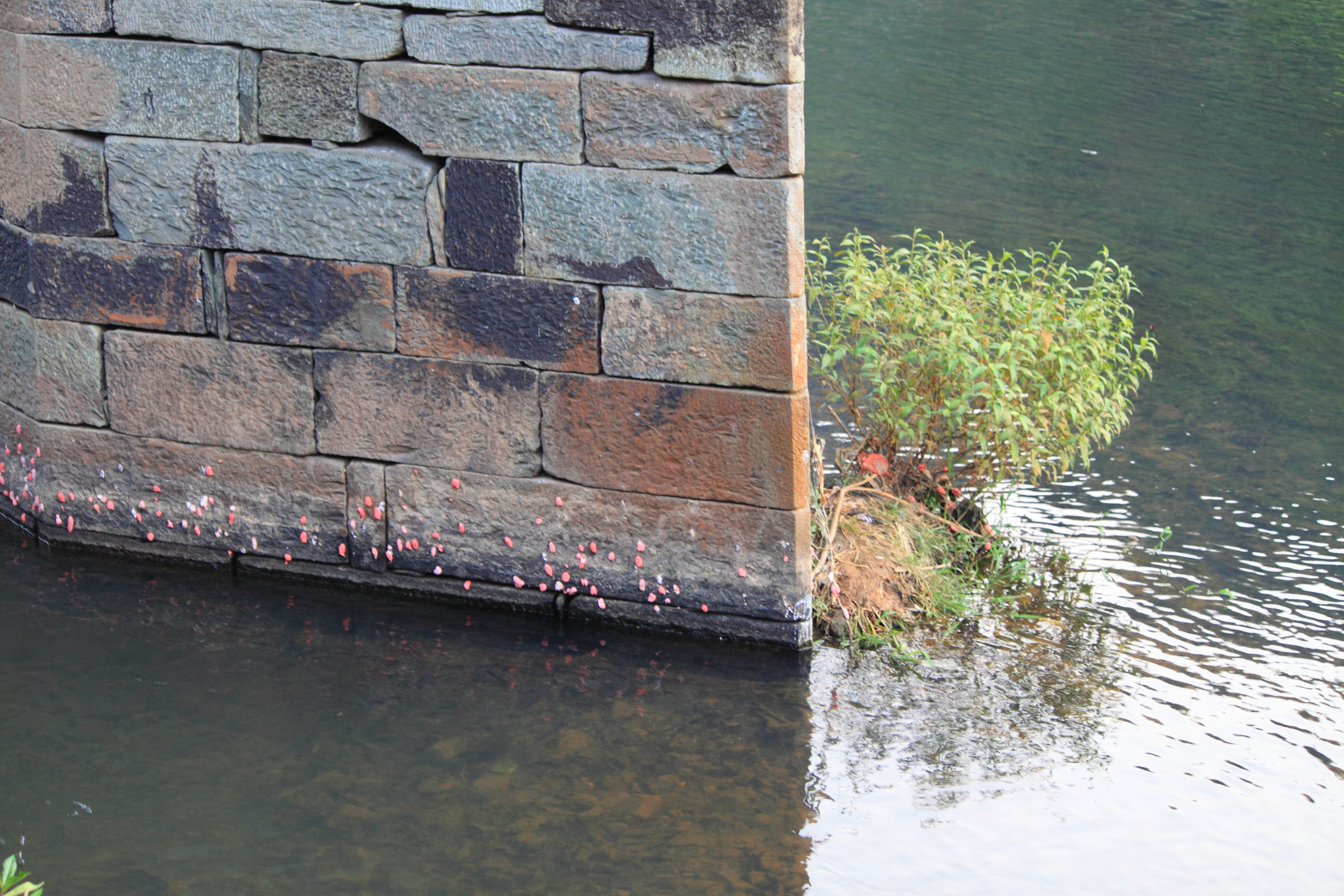

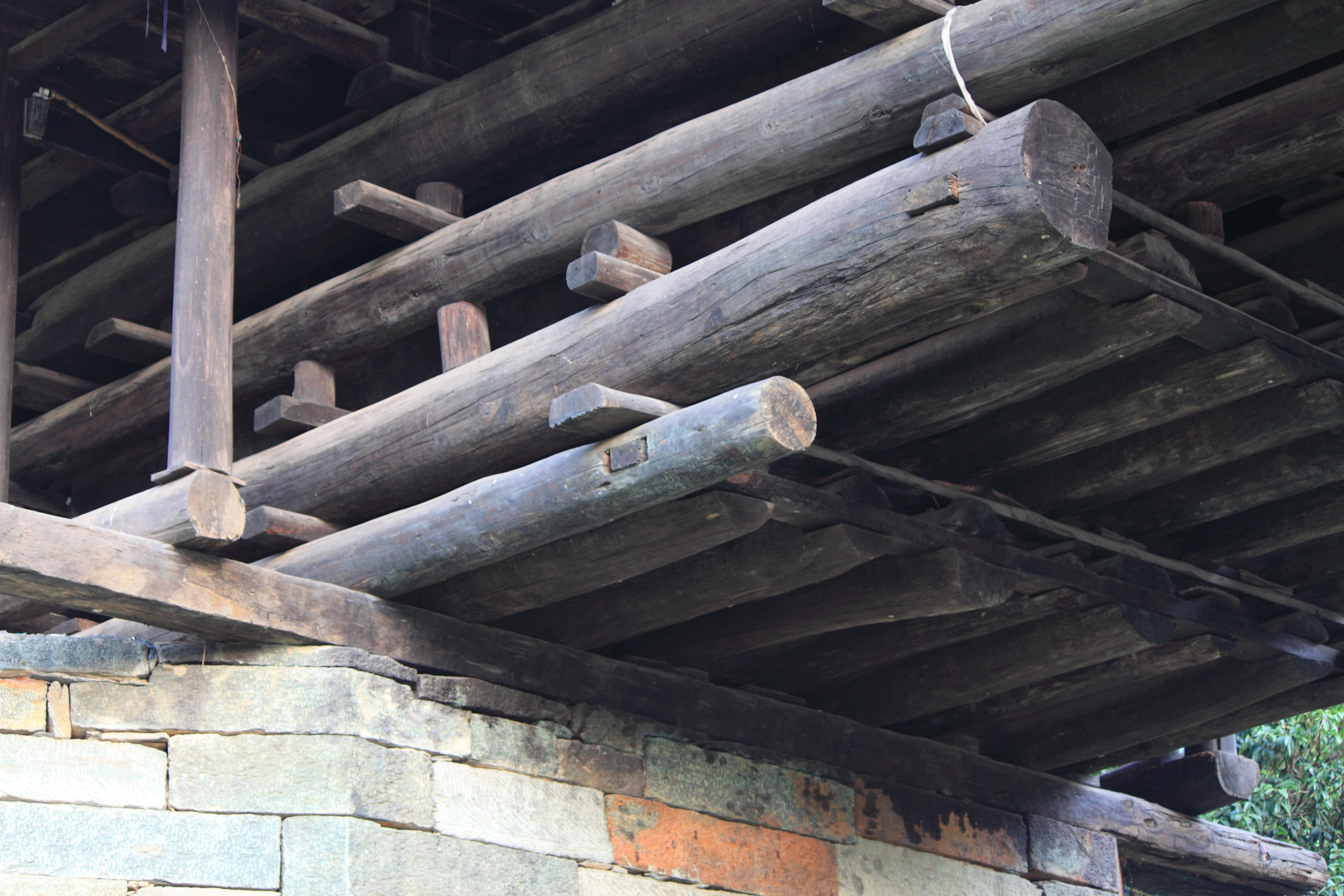

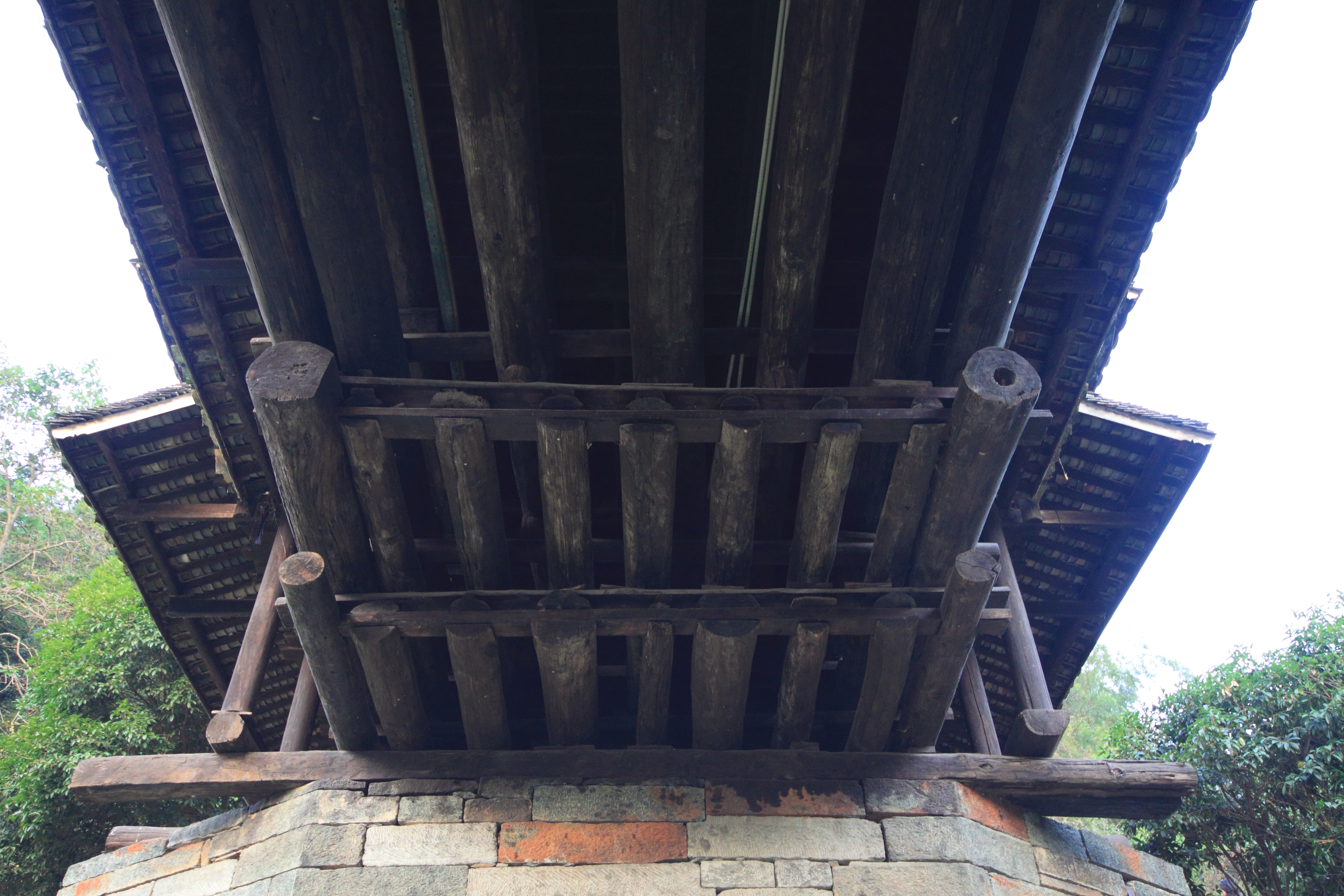

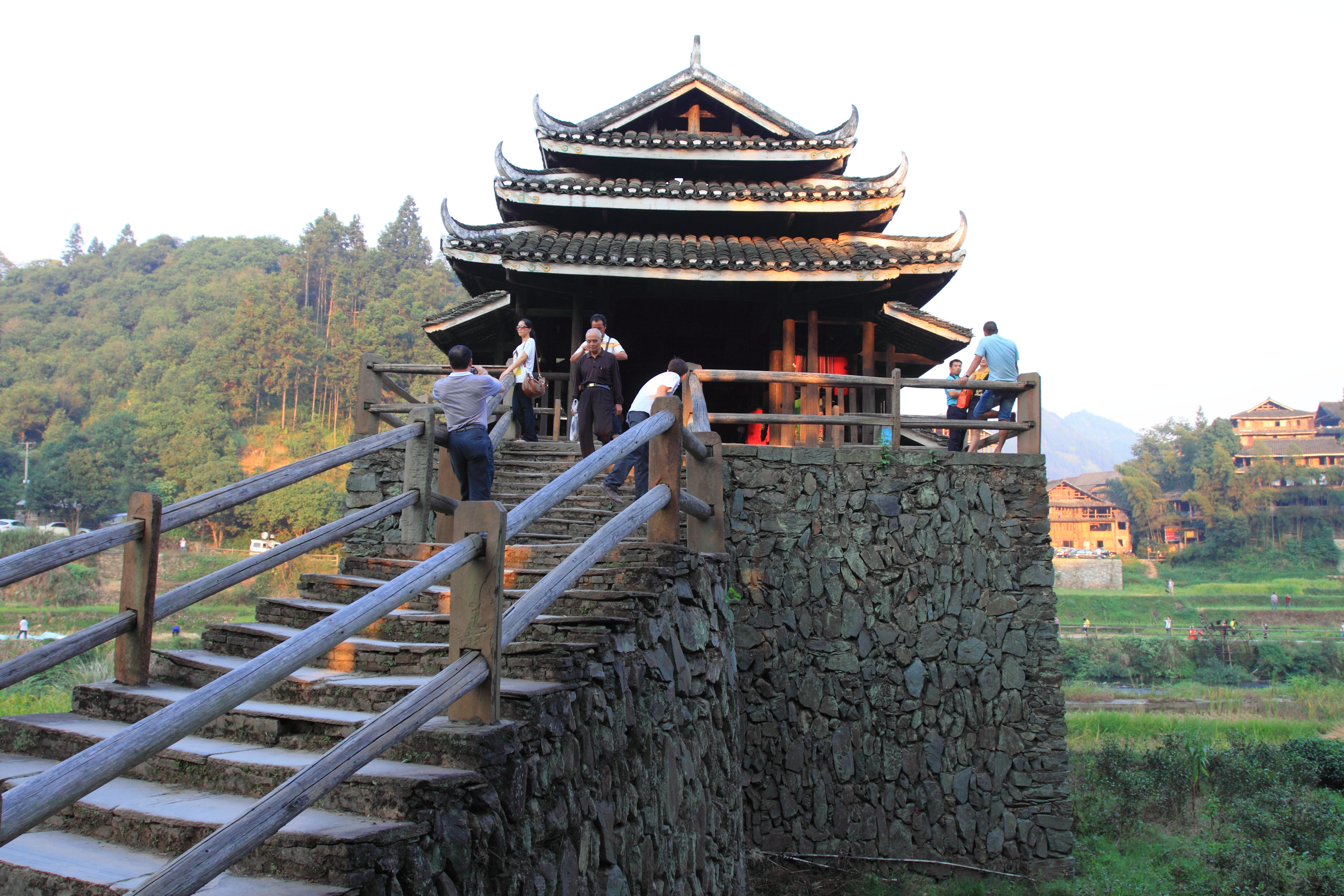
south of the bridge

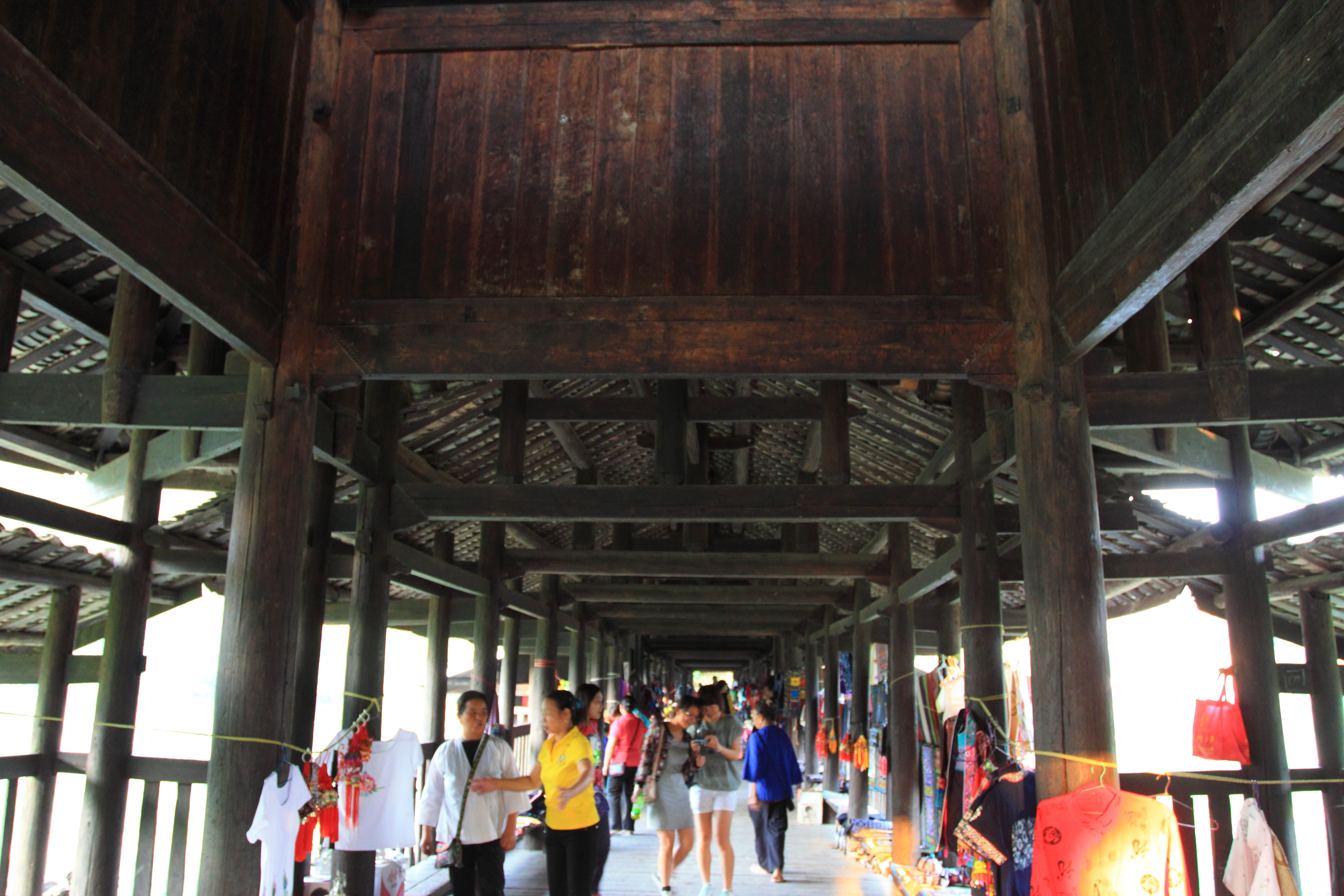

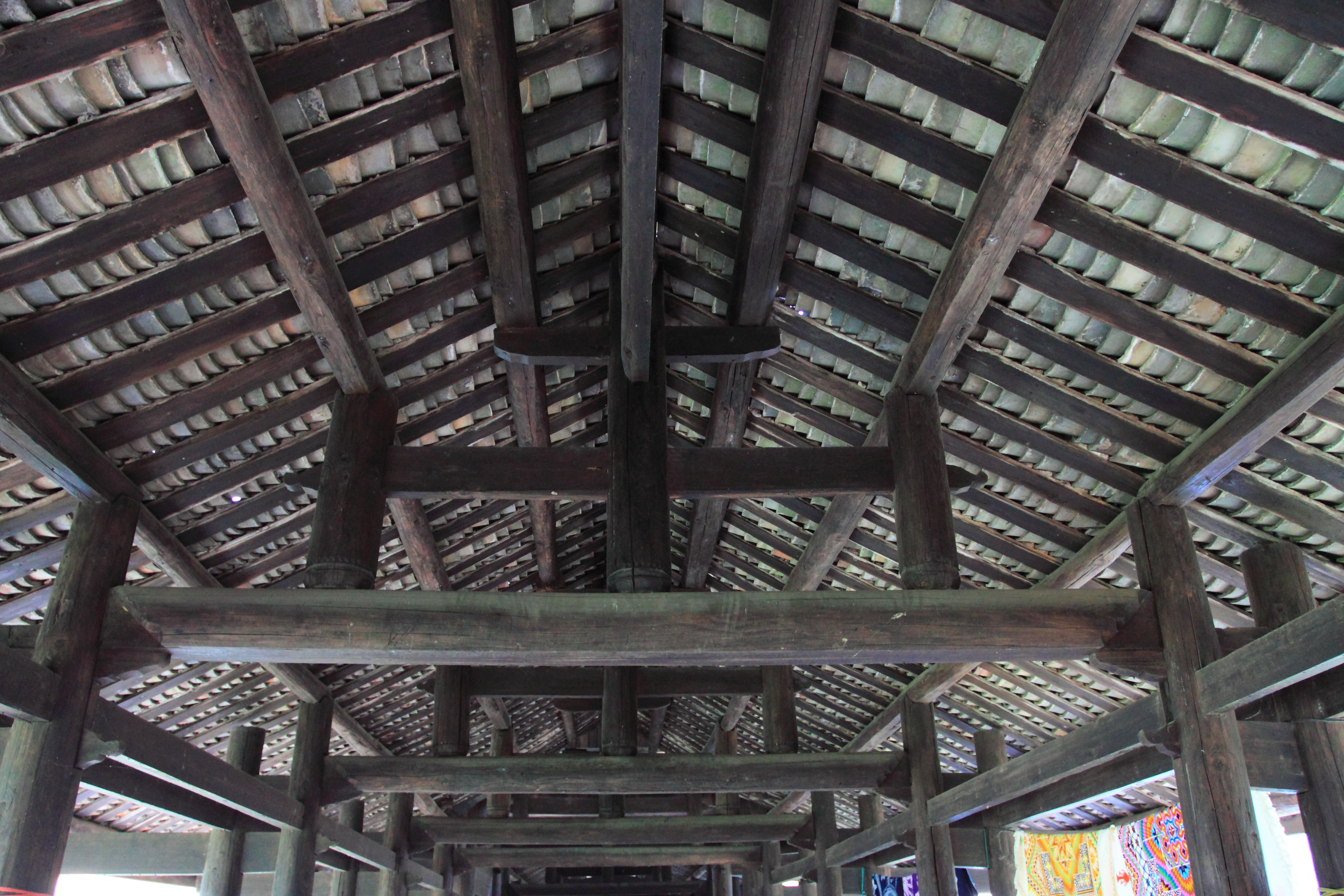

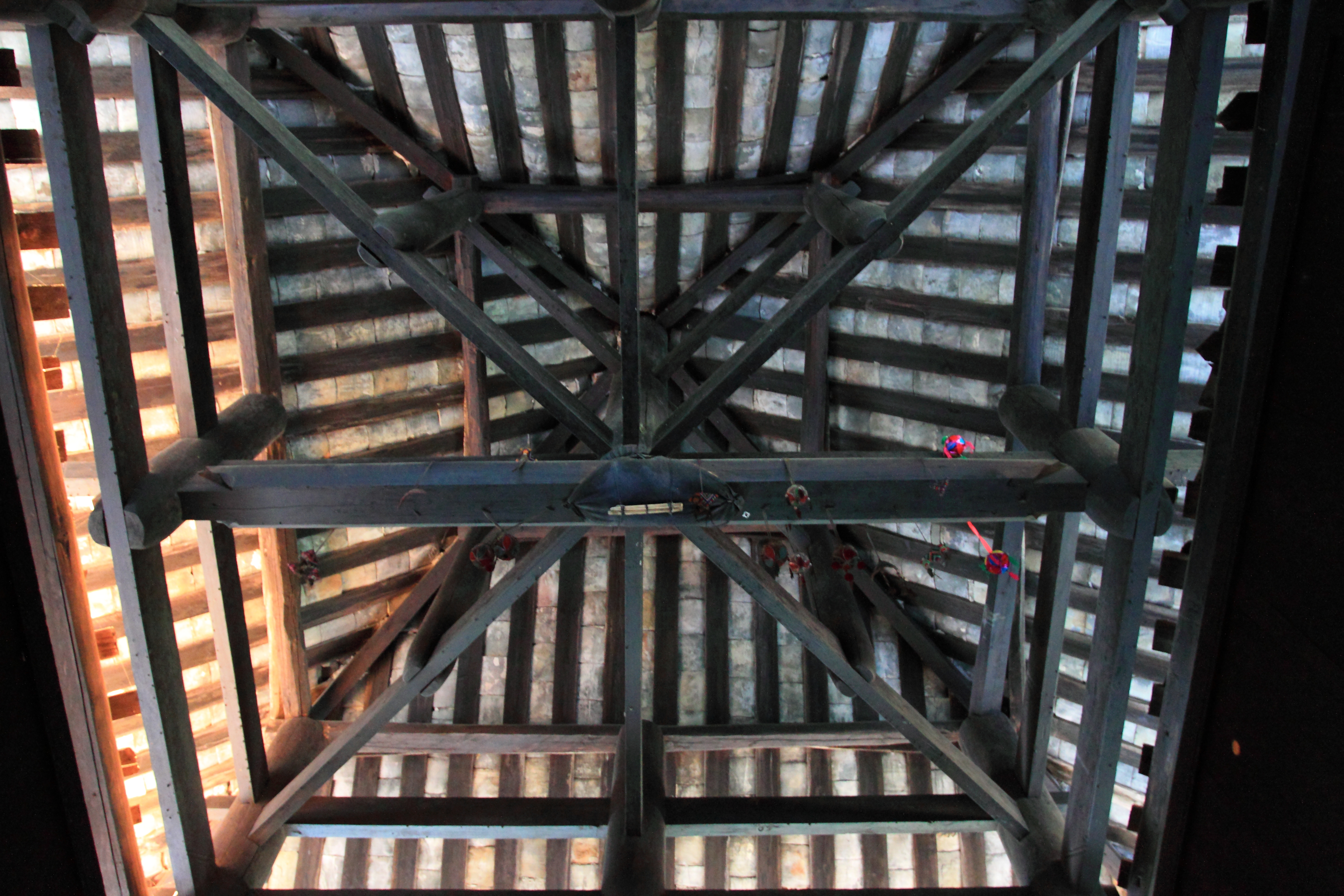

== See also ==
- Xijin Bridge, another large covered bridge in Zhejiang, China.
- List of bridges in China
