= Qingdao Airlines =

Chinese airline

Qingdao Airlines 青岛航空

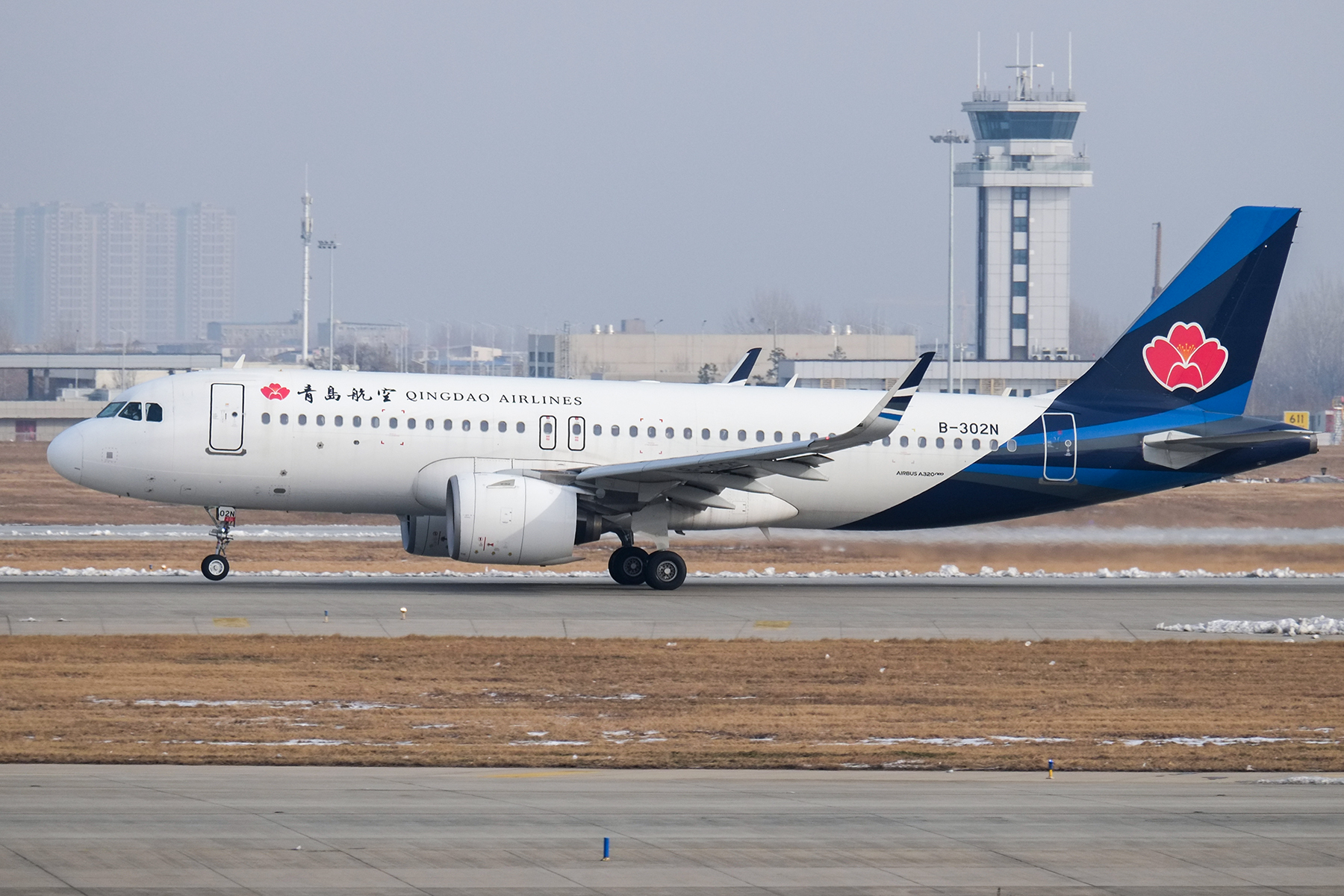
- A Qingdao Airlines Airbus A320neo
IATA	ICAO	Call sign
QW	QDA	SKY LEGEND
- Founded: June 2013; 13 years ago
- Commenced operations: 26 April 2014; 12 years ago
- Operating bases: Qingdao Jiaodong International Airport
- Fleet size: 38
- Destinations: 24
- Parent company: Nanshan Group
- Headquarters: Chengyang, Qingdao, Shandong, China
- Key people: Song Zuowen (President, As of April 2014)
- Website: www.qdairlines.com

Qingdao Airlines
- Simplified Chinese: 青岛航空
- Traditional Chinese: 青島航空
Transcriptions
Standard Mandarin
- Hanyu Pinyin: Qīngdǎo hángkōng

Qingdao Airlines is a Chinese airline that commenced operations on 26 April 2014. The carrier is based at Qingdao Jiaodong International Airport.

Initially, the airline was owned by the Nanshan Group (55%), the Qingdao Transport Development Group (QTDG) (25%) and Shandong Airlines (20%). The initial capital of Qingdao Airlines was CNY1 billion (USD161 million). In July 2015, Shandong Airlines transferred its shares to a subsidiary of the Nanshan Group; as of August 2015, the airline plans to sell the 25% of the shares held by QTDG in order to become fully private. Since November 2015, Qingdao Airlines was fully owned by Nanshan Group.

The airline's headquarters are in Chengyang District, Qingdao.

== History ==
An application for the establishment of an airline based in the Shandong province was filed with the Civil Aviation Administration of China (CAAC) by the Yantai-based Nanshan Group in May 2013. Approval was received by the CAAC between that month and June 2013, when Qingdao Airlines was formed.

== Destinations ==
Operations started on 26 April 2014 linking Qingdao with Chengdu. As of May 2014, the airline's top five routes ranked by seat capacity were Qingdao–Shanghai, Qingdao–Beijing, Qingdao–Hangzhou, Qingdao–Shenyang and Qingdao–Dalian. As of October 2016, Qingdao Airlines served the following destinations:

As of August 2024, Qingdao Airlines operates to the following destinations:

Country	City	Airport	Notes	Refs
Cambodia	Sihanoukville	Sihanouk International Airport		
China	Beijing	Beijing Capital International Airport		
China	Changchun	Changchun Longjia International Airport		
China	Changsha	Changsha Huanghua International Airport		
China	Dalian	Dalian Zhoushuizi International Airport		
China	Guilin	Guilin Liangjiang International Airport		
China	Guiyang	Guiyang Longdongbao International Airport		
China	Harbin	Harbin Taiping International Airport		
China	Hefei	Hefei Xinqiao International Airport		
China	Hohhot	Hohhot Baita International Airport		
China	Kunming	Kunming Changshui International Airport		
China	Lanzhou	Lanzhou Zhongchuan International Airport		
China	Nanjing	Nanjing Lukou International Airport		
China	Nanning	Nanning Wuxu International Airport		
China	Qingdao	Qingdao Jiaodong International Airport	Hub	
China	Qingdao	Qingdao Liuting International Airport	Airport Closed	
China	Quanzhou	Quanzhou Jinjiang International Airport		
China	Shanghai	Shanghai Pudong International Airport		
China	Shenyang	Shenyang Taoxian International Airport		
China	Tianjin	Tianjin Binhai International Airport		
China	Ürümqi	Ürümqi Diwopu International Airport		
China	Yantai	Yantai Penglai International Airport		
China	Yinchuan	Yinchuan Hedong International Airport		
China	Zunyi	Zunyi Xinzhou Airport		
Japan	Osaka	Kansai International Airport		
Japan	Shizuoka	Shizuoka Airport		
Laos	Vientiane	Wattay International Airport		
Malaysia	Penang	Penang International Airport		
Malaysia	Kuala Lumpur	Kuala Lumpur International Airport		
Philippines	Tagbilaran	Bohol–Panglao International Airport		
South Korea	Seoul	Incheon International Airport		
Thailand	Bangkok	Don Mueang International Airport		
Vietnam	Nha Trang	Cam Ranh International Airport		

The airline originally aimed to become a ″boutique airline″ and had plans to start services to Shenzhen and Shenyang in the near future; Guangzhou and Shanghai were expected to be served in the longer term.

== Fleet ==
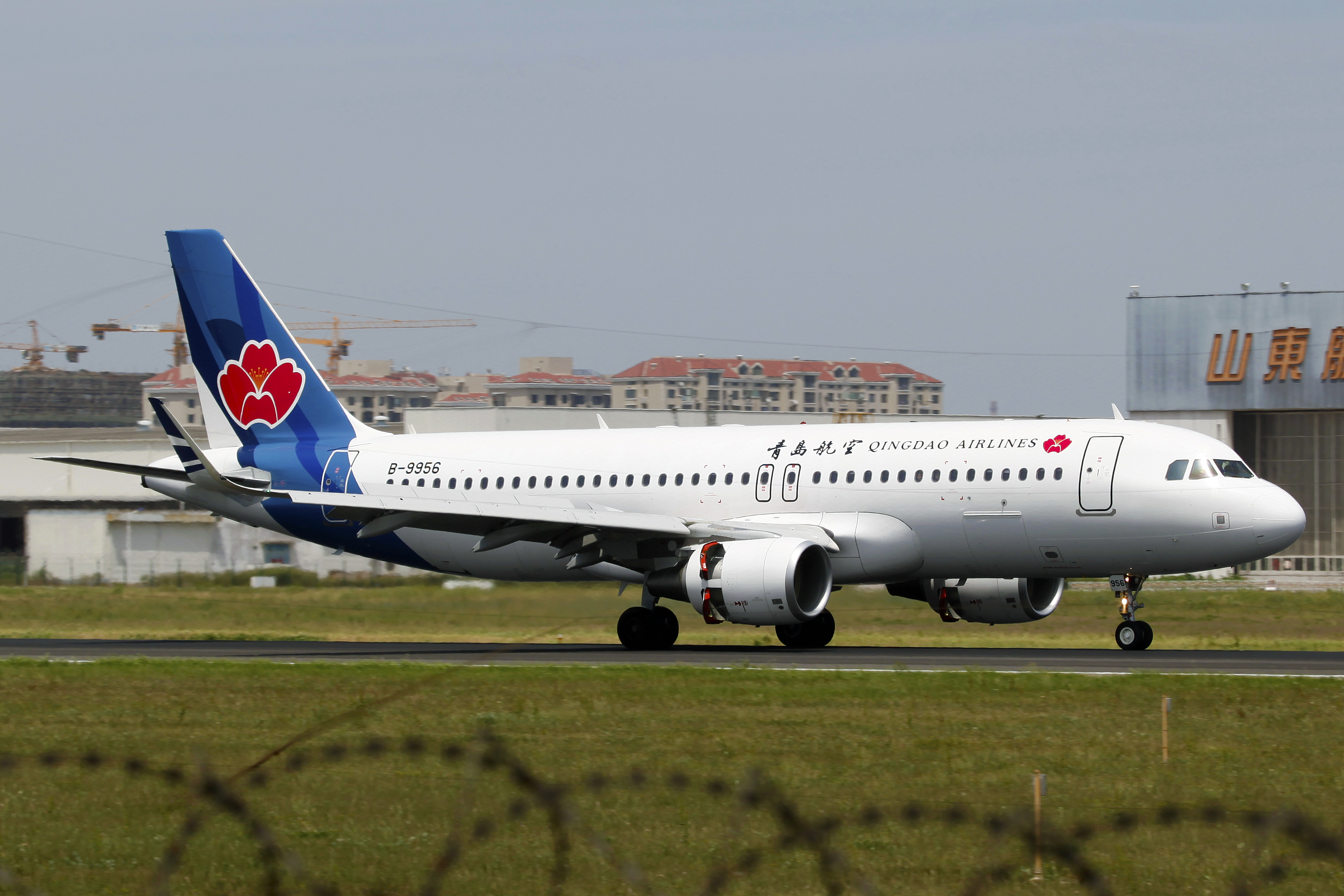
Qingdao Airlines Airbus A320 at Qingdao Liuting International Airport

As of August 2025, Qingdao Airlines fleet consists of the following aircraft:

Qingdao Airlines fleet
Aircraft	In service	Orders
Airbus A320-200	14	—
Airbus A320neo	22	—
Airbus A321neo	2	—
Total	38	—

In September 2013, an order for five Airbus A320s and 18 A320neos was placed in a deal valued at USD2.5 billion. The carrier phased in its first aircraft, a 152-seater Airbus A320, in early April 2014. The carrier took ownership of its first two A320neos in October 2018. Qingdao Airlines planned to expand its fleet to 60 aircraft by 2020.
