= Sanjiang Dong Autonomous County =

Sanjiang County 三江侗族自治县 · Sanhgyangh Yen Sankiang
- County
- Sanjiang Dong Autonomous County 三江侗族自治县; Sanhgyangh Dungcuz Swciyen; Saml Nyal Dongl Zuc Zil Zil Yenh
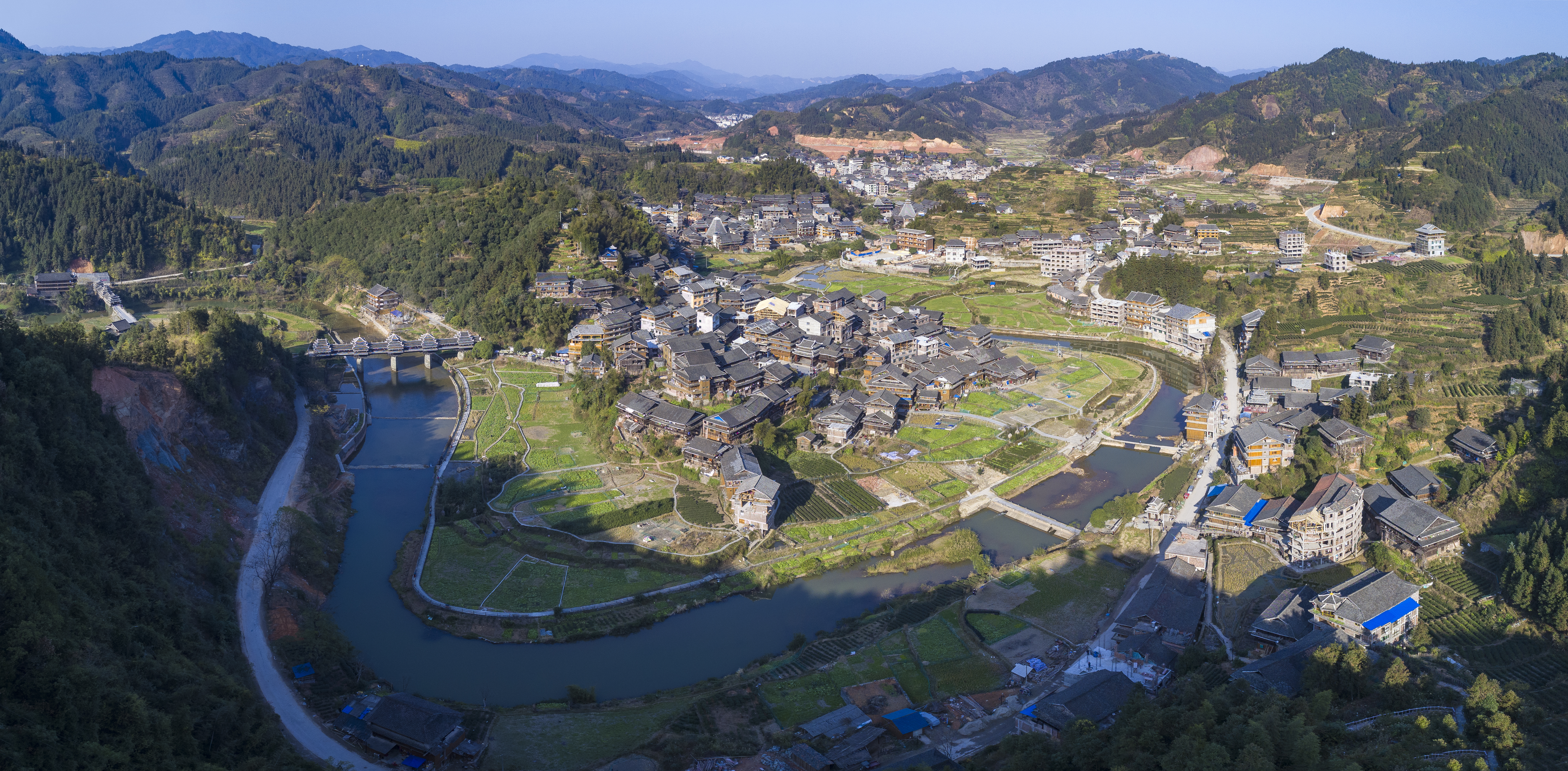
- Aerial panorama of Chengyang, a scenic area in Sanjiang

- Location in Guangxi
- Coordinates: 25°47′N 109°36′E
- Country: China
- Autonomous region: Guangxi
- Prefecture-level city: Liuzhou
- County seat: Guyi Town

Area
  - Total: 2,455 km^{2} (948 sq mi)

Population (2010)
  - Total: 297,244
  - Density: 121.1/km^{2} (313.6/sq mi)
- Time zone: UTC+8 (China Standard)
- Postal code: 5455XX

Sanjiang Dong Autonomous County (simplified Chinese: 三江侗族自治县; traditional Chinese: 三江侗族自治縣; pinyin: Sānjiāng Dòngzú Zìzhìxiàn; Standard Zhuang: Sanhgyangh Dungcuz Swciyen; Southern Dong: Saml Nyal Dongl Zuc Zil Zil Yenh) is under the administration of Liuzhou, Guangxi Zhuang Autonomous Region, China. It is a region traditionally inhabited by the Dong people, bordering the prefecture-level divisions of Qiandongnan (Guizhou) to the north, Huaihua (Hunan) to the northeast and Guilin to the west.

It has an area of 2,429 square kilometres (938 sq mi) and a population of 297,244.

== Administrative divisions ==
Sanjiang County is divided into 6 towns, 6 townships and 3 ethnic townships:

Towns

- Guyi Town 古宜镇
- Doujiang Town 斗江镇
- Danzhou Town 丹洲镇
- Bajiang Town 八江镇
- Linxi Town 林溪镇
- Dudong Town 独峒镇

Townships

- Meilin Township 梅林乡
- Yangxi Township 洋溪乡
- Liangkou Township 良口乡
- Laobao Township 老堡乡
- Heping Township 和平乡
- Chengcun Township 程村乡

Ethnic townships

- Tongle Miao Ethnic Township 同乐苗族乡
- Fulu Miao Ethnic Township 富禄苗族乡
- Gaoji Yao Ethnic Township 高基瑶族乡

== Transportation ==
- China National Highway 209
- Reach by bus from Longsheng Rice Terrace about 1.5 hours, Guilin 4.5 hours
- Sanjiang County Railway Station, about 10 kilometres (6.2 mi) from the main square and "Bird's Nest" bullfighting arena.
- Sanjiang South Railway Station, also about 10 kilometres (6.2 mi) south from the main square. The station mainly serves the Guiyang-Guangzhou high-speed railway that pass through the area.

== Tourism ==
20 kilometres (12 mi) north of Sanjiang, toward Hunan province, lies the area of Dong people, Chengyang (程阳), which is a popular destination for backpacker tourism. The area comprises eight traditional Dong minority villages. The houses are all made of wood. Inside the villages you will find traditional drum towers, which were used to announce important things or simply to perform plays to entertain the villagers. Crossing the river is the best preserved Wind and Rain Bridge (程阳风雨桥, chéng yáng fēng yǔ qiáo) which has five parts. The bridge dates to 1912 and is for many people the main reason to visit the village.

North of Chengyang is the village of Linxia, which has a local market but no accommodation for visitors.

== Climate ==
Climate data for Sanjiang, elevation 197 m (646 ft), (1991–2020 normals, extremes 1981–2010)
Month	Jan	Feb	Mar	Apr	May	Jun	Jul	Aug	Sep	Oct	Nov	Dec	Year
Record high °C (°F)	26.6 (79.9)	30.4 (86.7)	33.3 (91.9)	34.4 (93.9)	35.4 (95.7)	37.8 (100.0)	39.2 (102.6)	38.7 (101.7)	39.1 (102.4)	35.2 (95.4)	31.5 (88.7)	27.4 (81.3)	39.2 (102.6)
Mean daily maximum °C (°F)	11.3 (52.3)	14.2 (57.6)	17.9 (64.2)	24.1 (75.4)	28.2 (82.8)	30.7 (87.3)	33.0 (91.4)	33.4 (92.1)	30.8 (87.4)	25.5 (77.9)	20.2 (68.4)	14.5 (58.1)	23.7 (74.6)
Daily mean °C (°F)	7.5 (45.5)	10.0 (50.0)	13.5 (56.3)	19.0 (66.2)	22.9 (73.2)	25.9 (78.6)	27.5 (81.5)	27.3 (81.1)	24.7 (76.5)	19.8 (67.6)	14.7 (58.5)	9.5 (49.1)	18.5 (65.3)
Mean daily minimum °C (°F)	5.1 (41.2)	7.3 (45.1)	10.7 (51.3)	15.7 (60.3)	19.5 (67.1)	22.8 (73.0)	24.1 (75.4)	23.7 (74.7)	20.8 (69.4)	16.3 (61.3)	11.3 (52.3)	6.4 (43.5)	15.3 (59.5)
Record low °C (°F)	−3.3 (26.1)	−2.7 (27.1)	−0.5 (31.1)	3.7 (38.7)	9.3 (48.7)	13.1 (55.6)	17.2 (63.0)	18.9 (66.0)	13.0 (55.4)	4.6 (40.3)	0.8 (33.4)	−4.3 (24.3)	−4.3 (24.3)
Average precipitation mm (inches)	52.9 (2.08)	64.0 (2.52)	102.2 (4.02)	142.6 (5.61)	237.8 (9.36)	309.5 (12.19)	267.3 (10.52)	126.7 (4.99)	74.6 (2.94)	68.8 (2.71)	57.0 (2.24)	41.3 (1.63)	1,544.7 (60.81)
Average precipitation days (≥ 0.1 mm)	13.8	13.2	18.7	17.5	18.0	18.8	15.7	12.9	8.6	9.1	9.8	9.8	165.9
Average snowy days	1.7	0.8	0	0	0	0	0	0	0	0	0	0.6	3.1
Average relative humidity (%)	79	79	82	81	83	85	82	81	79	79	80	77	81
Mean monthly sunshine hours	42.1	46.3	54.1	78.3	103.9	100.8	163.4	186.6	157.5	120.3	95.0	79.2	1,227.5
Percentage possible sunshine	13	15	15	20	25	25	39	47	43	34	29	24	27
Source: China Meteorological Administration

== Notable people ==
- Wu Hongfei, journalist, novelist, and rock singer

== See also ==
- Rong River
- Rongshui Miao Autonomous County
