= Chengyang, Guangxi =

Area of Guangxi, China

Coordinates: 25.9059°N 109.6430°E

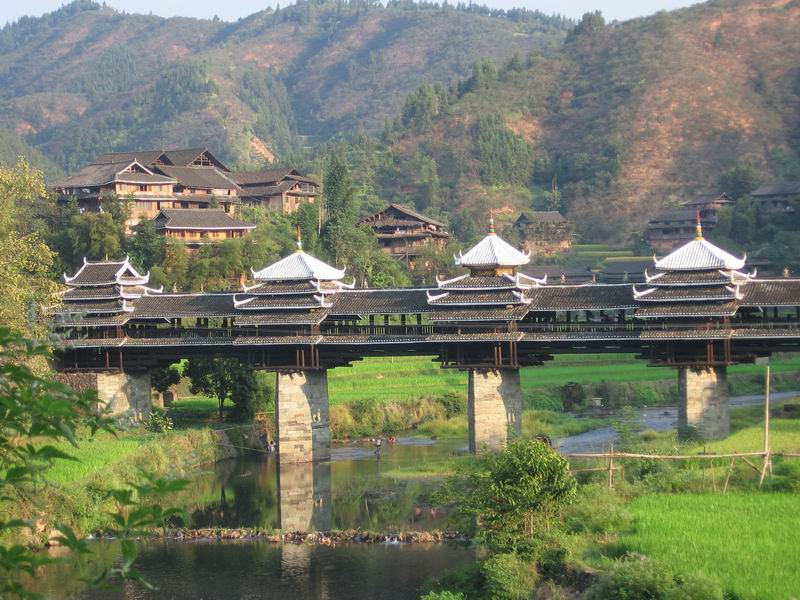
Chengyang Bridge of the Dong people.

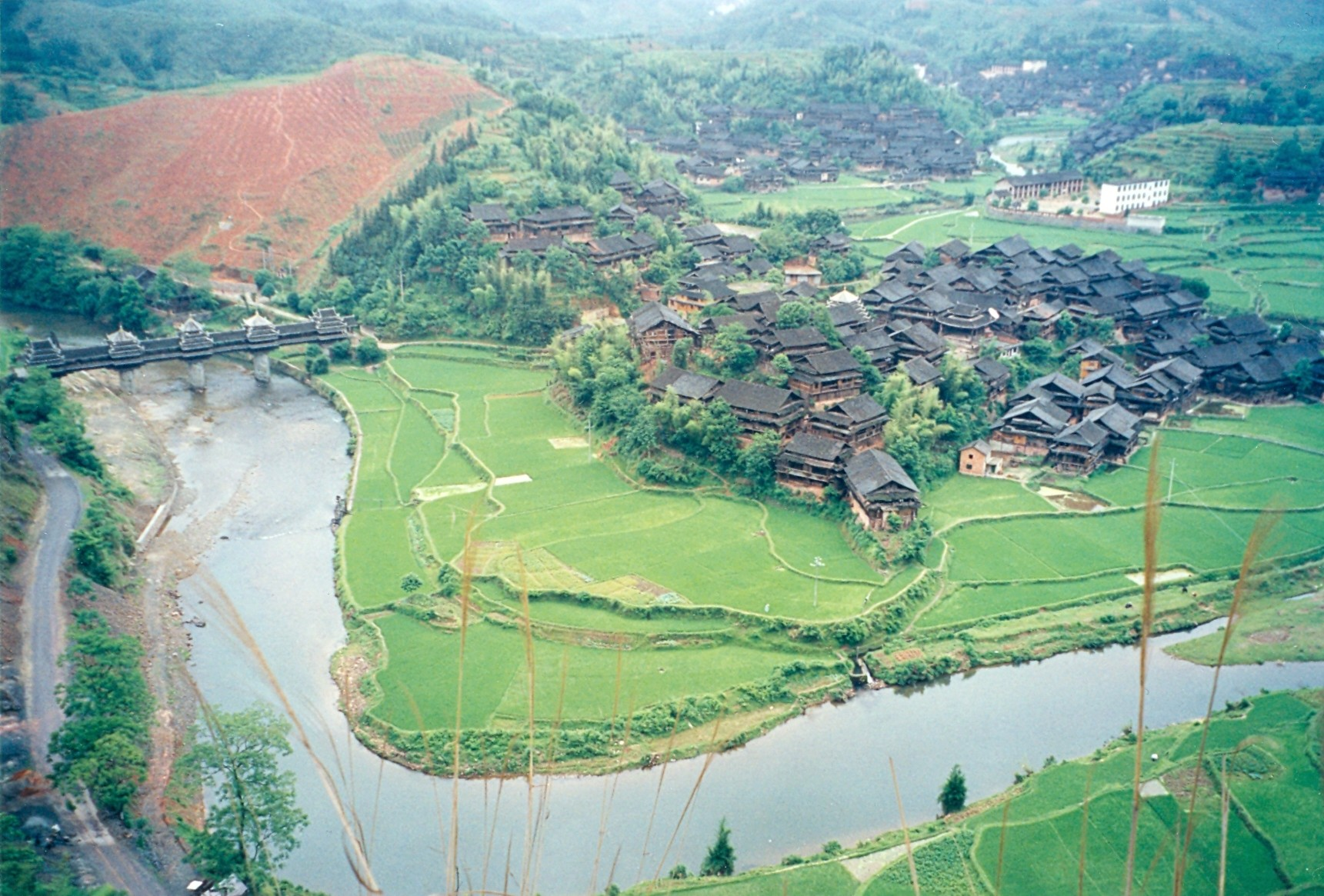
Overview of Chengyang.

Chengyang (程阳) is an area consisting of eight villages in the Sanjiang Dong Autonomous County of Guangxi province of China, located 4–5 hours from Guilin city.

It is known for its "Folk Custom Centre" and the Chengyang Bridge, a covered bridge known locally as a "wind and rain bridge" due to the protection it offers from the weather.

The bridge is protected as a valued cultural relic of the Dong people, and was added to the UNESCO World Heritage Tentative List on February 12, 1996, in the Cultural category.

Chengyang has been widely studied due to its sustainable irrigation techniques that use its natural topography and local materials (like bamboo) to irrigate rice fields with river water.
