= Chengyang railway station =

Railway station in Qingdao, Shandong

Chengyang 城阳
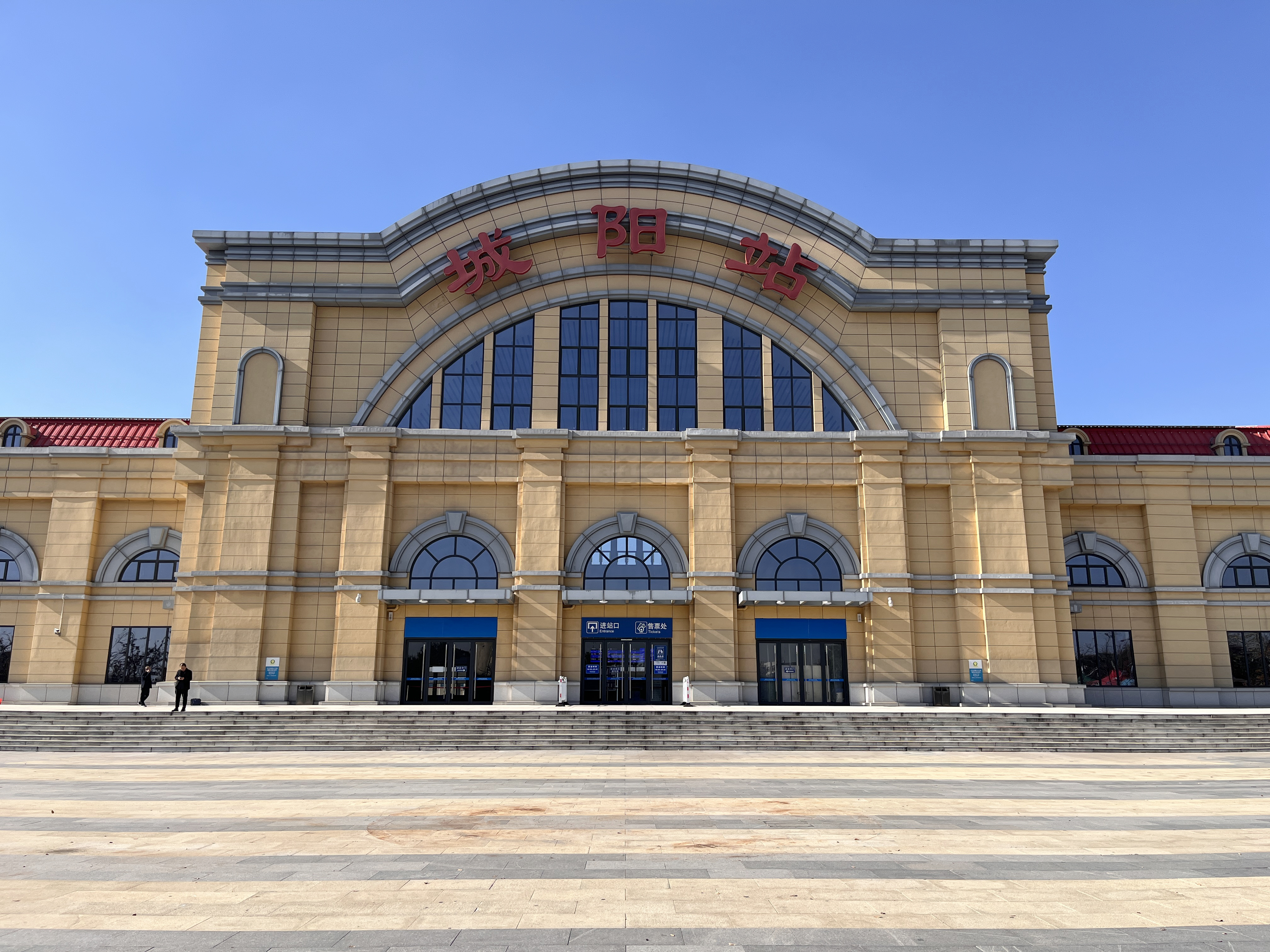
- Front square of the railway station in 2025

General information
- Location: Chengyang District, Qingdao, Shandong; China
- Coordinates: 36°17′54.89″N 120°21′35.47″E
- Lines: Qingdao–Jinan passenger railway Qingdao–Rongcheng intercity railway Jinan–Qingdao high-speed railway

History
- Opened: 1901; July 1, 2022 (new station building)
Location

Chengyang railway station (Chinese: 城阳站; pinyin: Chéngyáng zhàn) is a railway station in Chengyang District, Qingdao, Shandong, China.

== History ==
The station was built in 1901.

From 16 March 2015, Chengyang railway station has been closed to passengers for refurbishment as part of the construction of the second part of the Qingdao–Rongcheng intercity railway, between Jimo and Qingdao. At the time, this work was expected to take one year. The station buildings were rebuilt, this was completed in 2020. It reopened on 1 July 2022.
