= Chengyang, Qingdao =

Chengyang 城阳区
- District
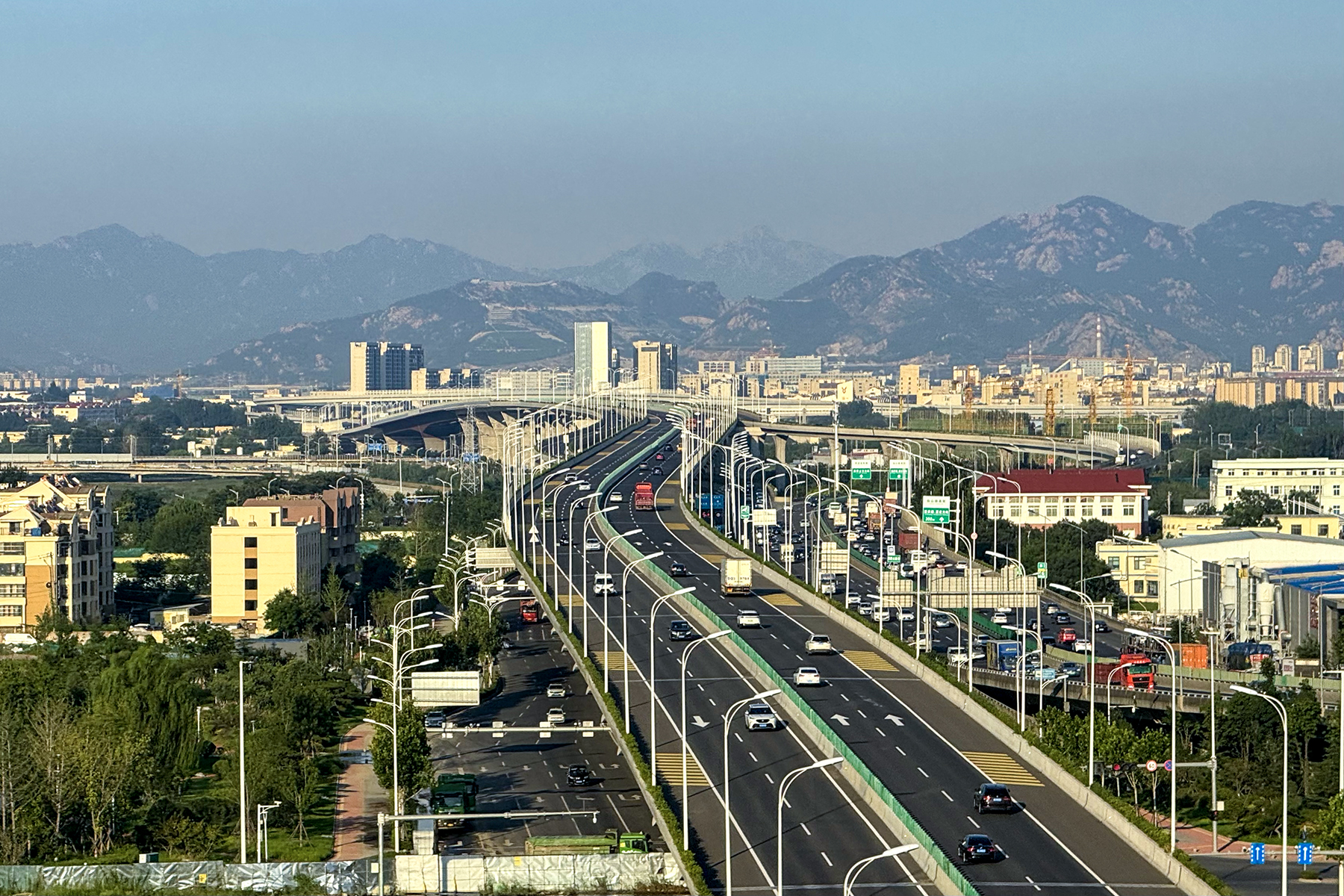
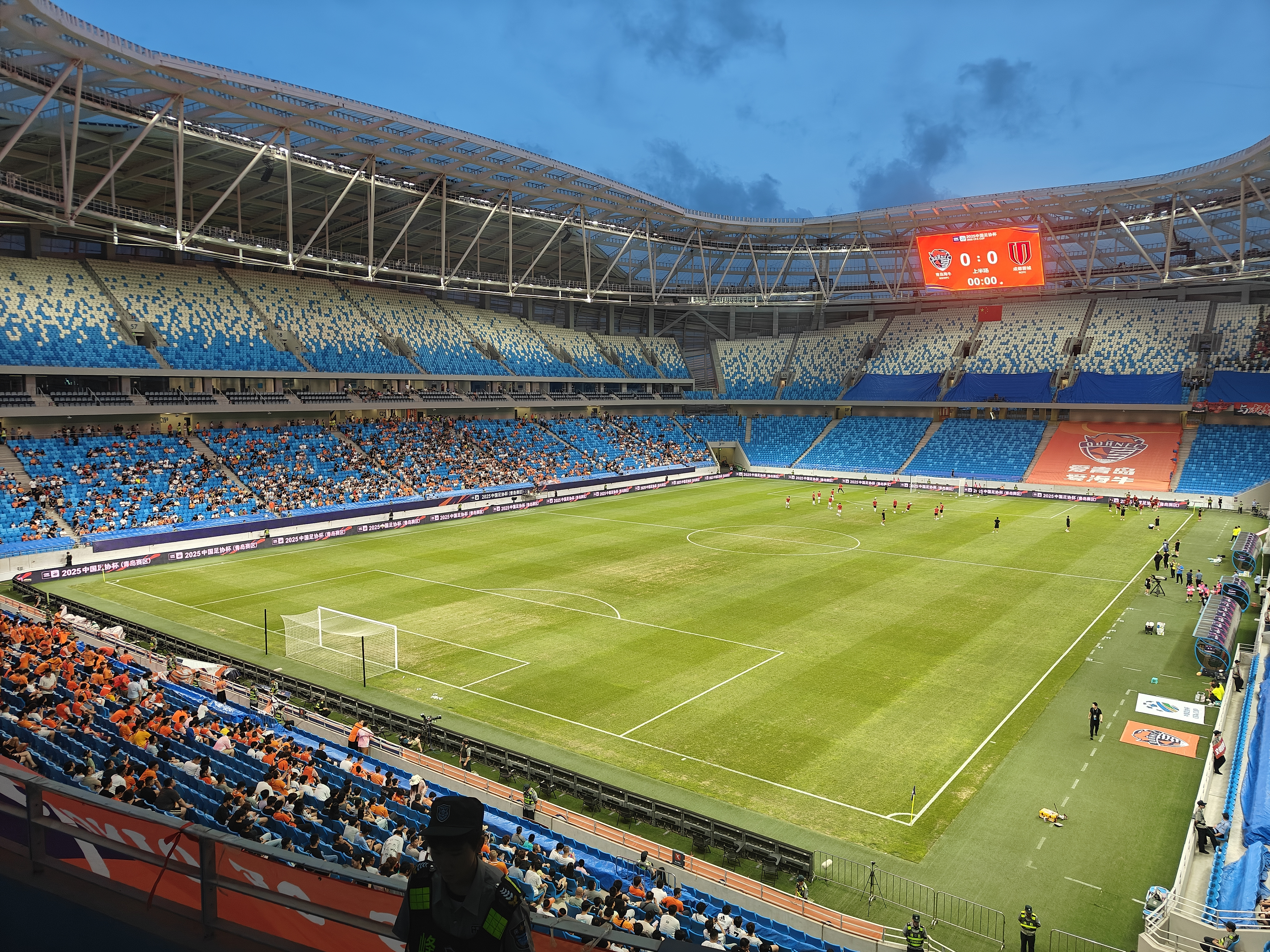
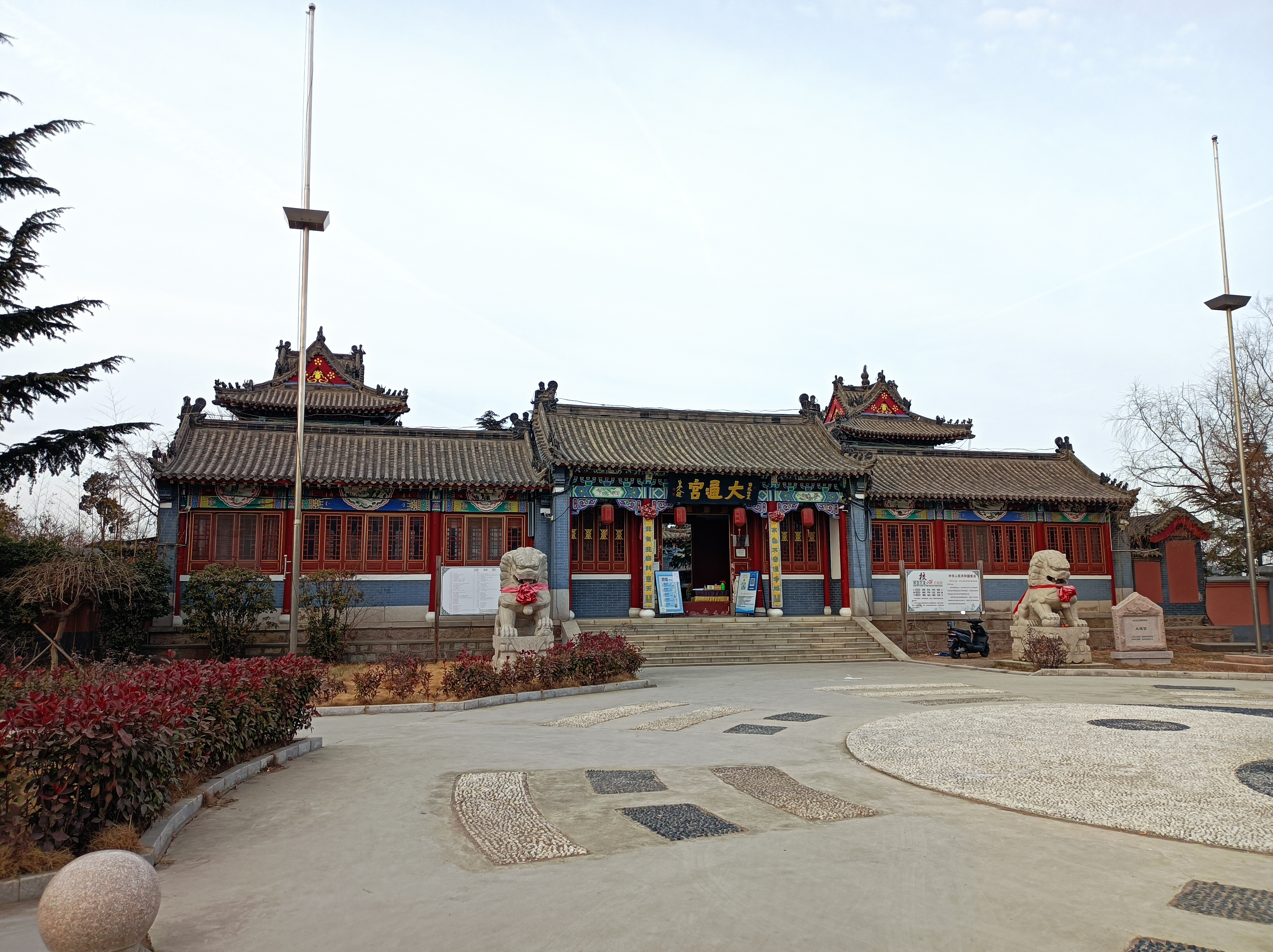
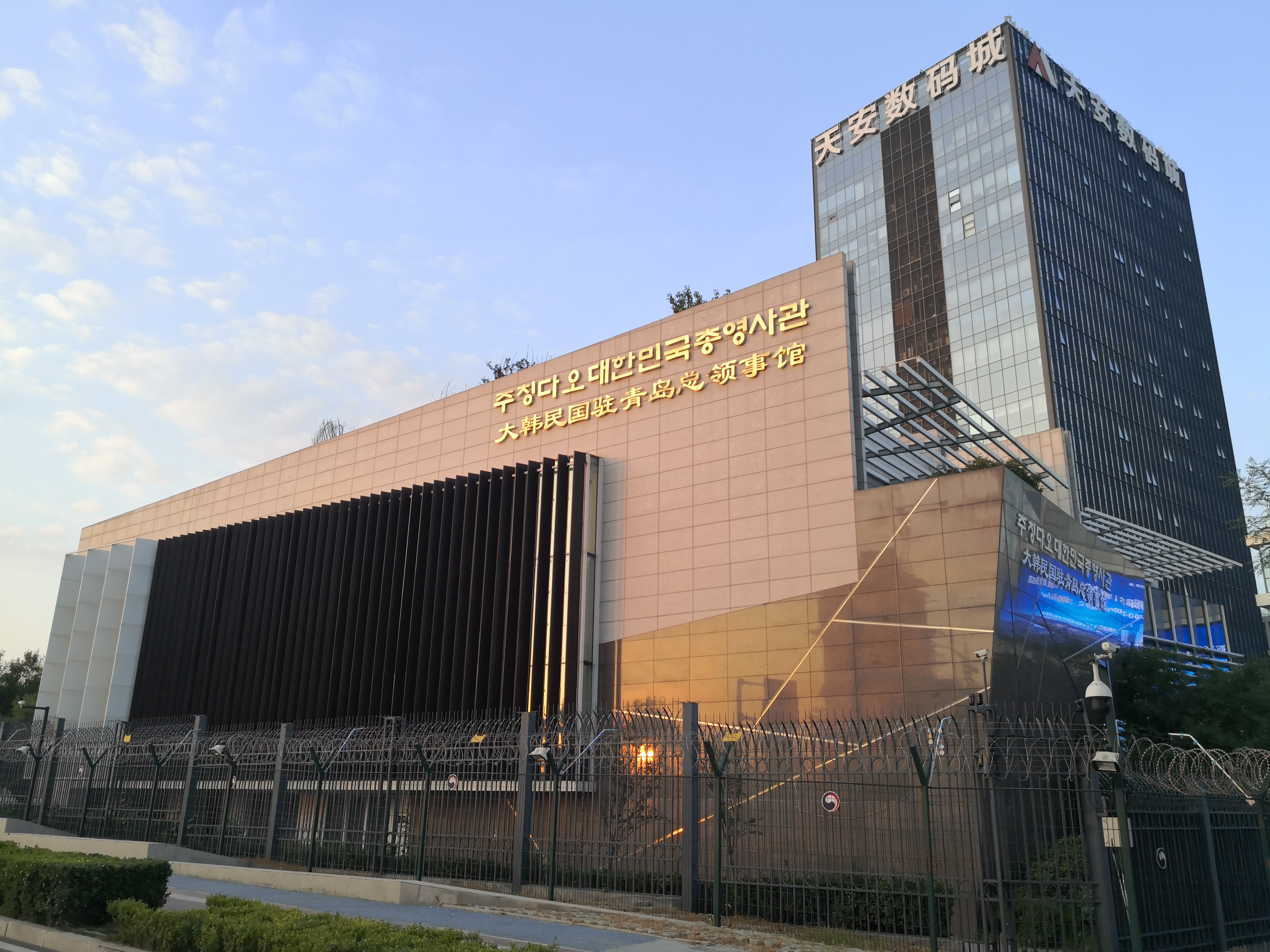
- Chengyang downtown Qingdao Youth Football Stadium Datong Taoist Temple Consulate General of ROK

- Location of Chengyang in Qingdao

- Location in Shandong
- Coordinates (Chengyang railway station): 36°18′33″N 120°21′06″E
- Country: People's Republic of China
- Province: Shandong
- Sub-provincial city: Qingdao
- Subdistricts: 8

Government
  - Mayor: Zhang Xitian (张希田)

Area
  - Total: 858.2 km^{2} (331.4 sq mi)

Population (2019)
  - Total: 850,000
- Time zone: UTC+8 (China standard time)
- Postal code: 266109
- Website: www.chengyang.gov.cn

Chengyang (simplified Chinese: 城阳区; traditional Chinese: 城陽區; pinyin: Chéngyáng Qū) is a district of the prefecture-level city of Qingdao, Shandong, China. It has an area of 553.2 km^{2} (213.6 sq mi), and had a 2013 population of about 740,000. The district includes hilly terrain, plains, and farmland.

== Location ==
Chengyang borders eastern Laoshan district, southern Licang district, Jiaozhou Bay, Jiaozhou City, and northern Jimo district. Its geographic center is near 36°20′N 120°12′E, and it covers 553.2 square kilometres (213.6 sq mi).

=== Climate ===
The district, located in the north temperate monsoon region, has a mild monsoon climate. Qingdao is influenced by the southeast monsoon, and has a maritime climate. The record high temperature, set on July 27, 1997, is 37.4 °C (99.3 °F); the record low temperature is −16.4 °C (2.5 °F), set on January 10, 1931. August is the hottest month, with an average temperature of 25.1 °C (77.2 °F); the coldest month is January, with an average temperature of −1.2 °C (29.8 °F).

Climate data for Chengyang District (Qingdao Liuting International Airport) (1991–2020)
Month	Jan	Feb	Mar	Apr	May	Jun	Jul	Aug	Sep	Oct	Nov	Dec	Year
Mean daily maximum °C (°F)	3.9 (39.0)	6.6 (43.9)	12.1 (53.8)	17.8 (64.0)	23.5 (74.3)	27.0 (80.6)	29.9 (85.8)	29.8 (85.6)	26.8 (80.2)	20.9 (69.6)	12.6 (54.7)	6.2 (43.2)	18.1 (64.6)
Daily mean °C (°F)	−0.2 (31.6)	2.3 (36.1)	7.3 (45.1)	13.2 (55.8)	18.9 (66.0)	22.9 (73.2)	26.4 (79.5)	26.4 (79.5)	22.5 (72.5)	16.1 (61.0)	8.4 (47.1)	1.8 (35.2)	13.8 (56.9)
Mean daily minimum °C (°F)	−4.3 (24.3)	−2.0 (28.4)	2.5 (36.5)	8.6 (47.5)	14.4 (57.9)	18.9 (66.0)	23.0 (73.4)	23.0 (73.4)	18.1 (64.6)	11.3 (52.3)	4.1 (39.4)	−2.6 (27.3)	9.6 (49.2)
Average relative humidity (%)	63.6	61.7	58.1	59.1	63.3	72.7	79.9	77.9	68.8	63.8	65.2	64.3	66.5
Source: IEM

== Population ==
At the end of 2019, the district's population was 850,000. According to the 2020 census, its population was 1,109,606 on November 1. This compares with a 2010 population of 737,209.

== Economy ==
Chengyang had a 2019 gross domestic product of ¥112.183 billion, an increase of 6.4 percent from the previous year. District revenue was ¥15.34 billion, an increase of 9.2 percent. Per-capita disposable income was ¥55,795, up 8.1 percent. GDP in 2020 was ¥120.963 billion.

=== Science and technology ===
By the end of 2018, there were 396 national high-tech enterprises in the district.

=== Culture ===
By the end of 2018, Chengyang had renovated 80 community cultural centers and hosted over 5,000 cultural activities; its 126 branch libraries had circulated more than 30,000 books. In 2020, the district's first 24-hour, self-service library was scheduled to be built. The district archives were opened to the public. With 420 newspapers and magazines, the total number of library materials reached 668,000.

=== Health care ===
At the end of 2018, there were 731 health institutions (including clinics and health rooms) in the district; this included 28 hospitals and health centers, 12 community-health institutions, one maternal and peidiatric institution, and 690 outpatient clinics, clinics, infirmaries, and health rooms. There were 3,398 beds and 6,322 health technicians, including 2,653 doctors and 3,179 nurses in the region.

In 2020, the Chengyang Campus of the City Women's and Children's Hospital was completed and Shulan (Chengyang) Hospital signed a cooperation agreement. At the end of the year there were 827 medical and health institutions (including clinics and health rooms) in the district, including 35 hospitals and health centers, 17 community-health centers, one maternal and pediatric institution and 774 outpatient clinics, clinics, infirmaries, and health rooms. The region had 4,106 beds and 7,131 health technicians, including 2,938 doctors and 3,205 nurses.

== Education ==
The district had 224 primary and secondary schools and kindergartens at the end of 2018, with 124,160 students and 10,390 teaching staff. There were 17 general secondary schools (including 5 high schools and 12 junior high schools), with 27,238 students and 2,505 staff; four vocational schools, with 8,036 students and 661 staff; 46 elementary schools, with 55,366 students and 3,036 staff; and 151 kindergartens, with 25,456 students and 3,637 staff. Special-education schools had 25,456 students and 3,637 staff. There were 151 kindergartens, with 25,456 students and 3,637 staff, and one special-education kindergarten with 177 students and 43 staff members. Four nine-year schools had 7,429 students (6,043 elementary and 1,386 junior-high) and 454 staff members, and one twelve-year school had 458 students (211 elementary, 92 junior-high and 155 high-school) and 54 teaching staff.

In 2020, 52 primary and secondary schools and kindergartens were planned to be renovated and expanded. At the end of the year, 280 primary and secondary schools and kindergartens (with 161,593 students and 13,892 staff members) were expected.

== Transportation ==
Lines 1 and 8 of the Qingdao Metro serve Chengyang, as well as the Chengyang and Hongdao railway stations. Qingdao Liuting International Airport was replaced by Qingdao Jiaodong International Airport, and Qingdao Airlines has its headquarters in the district.
